= Hedmark =

County of Norway (1919–2019)

Coordinates: 60°50′00″N 11°40′00″E

Hedmark fylke
- County
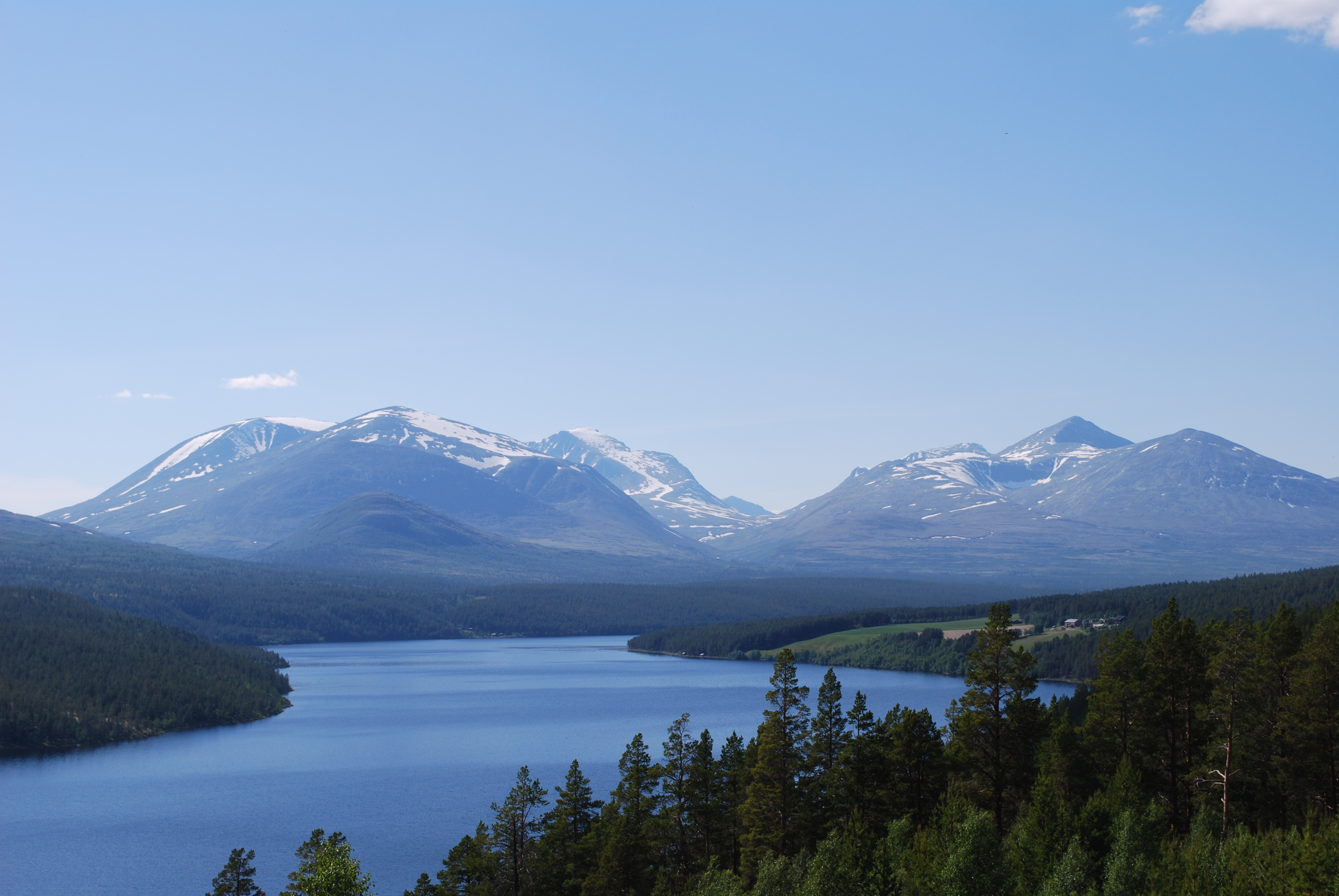
- Atnsjøen and Rondane in June 2009

- Flag Coat of arms

- Hedmark within Norway
- Country: Norway
- County: Hedmark
- Region: Eastern Norway
- County ID: NO-04
- Administrative centre: Hamar

Government
  - Governor: Sigbjørn Johnsen; Arbeiderpartiet (1997-2009–2019)
  - County mayor: Arnfinn Nergård; Senterpartiet (2007–2019)

Area
  - Total: 27,397 km^{2} (10,578 sq mi)
  - Land: 26,084 km^{2} (10,071 sq mi)
  - Rank: #4 in Norway, 8.57% of Norway's land area

Population (30 September 2019)
  - Total: 197,831 ▲
  - Rank: 11 (3.72% of country)
  - Density: 7.5/km^{2} (19/sq mi)
  - Change (10 years): ▲4.05 %
- Demonym: Hedmarking
- Time zone: UTC+01 (CET)
  - Summer (DST): UTC+02 (CEST)
- Official language form: Neutral
- Income (per capita): 132,200 NOK
- GDP (per capita): 204,205 NOK (2001)
- GDP national rank: 11 (2.52% of country)
- Website: www.hedmark.org

Historical population
Year	Pop.	±%
1951	173,167	—
1961	177,324	+2.4%
1971	179,204	+1.1%
1981	187,223	+4.5%
1991	187,314	+0.0%
2001	187,999	+0.4%
2011	191,622	+1.9%
2021?	204,065	+6.5%
2031?	216,105	+5.9%
Source: Statistics Norway.

Religion in Hedmark
religion	percent
Christianity	89.10%
Islam	0.75%
Buddhism	0.18%
Other	9.97%

Hedmark (Norwegian: [ˈhêːdmɑrk]) was a county in Norway from 1 January 1919 to 31 December 2019, bordering Trøndelag to the north, Oppland to the west, Akershus to the south, and Sweden to the east. The county administration is in Hamar.

Hedmark and Oppland counties were merged into Innlandet county on 1 January 2020, when Norway's former 19 counties became 10 bigger counties / regions.

Hedmark made up the northeastern part of Østlandet, the southeastern part of the country. It had a long border with Sweden to the east (Dalarna County and Värmland County). The largest lakes were Femunden and Mjøsa, the largest lake in Norway. Parts of Glomma, Norway's longest river, flowed through Hedmark. Geographically,

Hedmark was traditionally divided into: Hedemarken (east of the lake Mjøsa), Østerdalen ("East Valley" north of the town Elverum), and Solør / Glåmdalen (south of Elverum) and Odal in the very south. Hedmark and Oppland were the only Norwegian counties with no coastline. Hedmark also hosted some events of the 1994 Winter Olympic Games.

Hamar, Kongsvinger, and Elverum were cities in the county. Hedmark was one of the less urbanized areas in Norway; about half of the inhabitants lived on rural land. The population was mainly concentrated in the rich agricultural district adjoining Mjøsa to the southeast. The county's extensive forests supplied much of Norway's timber; at one time, logs were floated down Glomma to the coast but are now transported by truck and train.

Engerdal Municipality in Hedmark had the distinction of marking the current southernmost border in Norway of Sápmi, the traditional region of the Sami people.

The county was divided into three traditional districts. Those were Hedmarken, Østerdalen, and Solør (with Odalen and Vinger).

Hedmark was originally a part of the large Akershus amt, but in 1757 Oplandenes amt was separated from it. Some years later, in 1781, this was divided into Kristians amt (now Oppland) and Hedemarkens amt. Until 1919, the county was called Hedemarkens amt.

== Etymology ==
The Old Norse form of the name was Heiðmǫrk. The first element is heiðnir, the name of an old Germanic tribe and is related to the word heið, which means moorland. The last element is mǫrk 'woodland, borderland, march'. (See also Telemark and Finnmark.)

== Coat of arms ==
The coat of arms dates from 1987. It shows three barkespader, adzes used to remove bark from timber logs.

== Politics ==
Every four years the inhabitants of Hedmark elected 33 representatives to the Hedmark Fylkesting, the Hedmark County Assembly. After the elections of September 2007, the majority of the seats of the assembly were held by a three-party coalition consisting of the Labour Party (14 seats), the Centre Party (5 seats) and the Socialist Left Party (2 seats). Eight parties were represented in the assembly, the remaining 5 being the Progress Party (4 seats), the Conservative Party (4), the Liberal Party (2), the Christian Democratic Party (1) and the Pensioners Party (1). The assembly was headed by the county mayor (Norwegian: Fylkesordfører). From 2007 to 2011, the county mayor was Arnfinn Nergård, representing the Centre Party. In 2003, a parliamentary system was established, which meant that the county assembly elected a political administration or council to hold executive power. This county council reflected the majority of the county assembly and included the three parties holding the majority of the assembly seats, i.e., the Labour Party, the Center Party and the Socialist Left Party. The council was led by Siv Tørudbakken, a member of the Labour Party.

== Municipalities ==
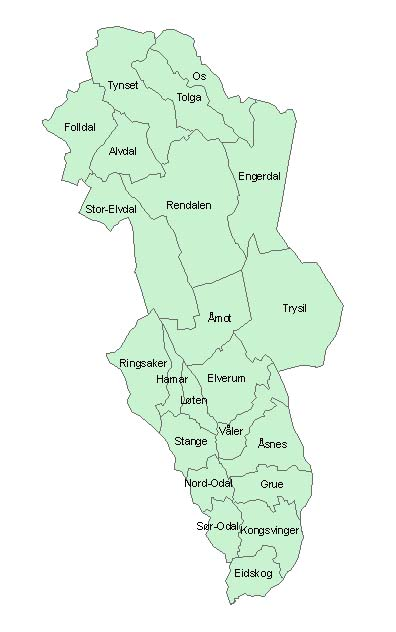
Municipalities of Hedmark

Rank	Name	Inhabitants	Area km^{2}
1	Ringsaker Municipality	34,151	1,125
2	Hamar Municipality	30,930	339
3	Elverum Municipality	21,123	1,221
4	Stange Municipality	20,646	642
5	Kongsvinger Municipality	17,934	965
6	Sør-Odal Municipality	7,884	487
7	Løten Municipality	7,615	363
8	Åsnes Municipality	7,279	1,015
9	Trysil Municipality	6,567	2,957
10	Eidskog Municipality	6,142	604
11	Tynset Municipality	5,605	1,831
12	Nord-Odal Municipality	5,097	476
13	Grue Municipality	4,740	787
14	Åmot Municipality	4,480	1,306
15	Våler Municipality	3,680	685
16	Stor-Elvdal Municipality	2,490	2,144
17	Alvdal Municipality	2,424	927
18	Os Municipality	1,936	1,013
19	Rendalen Municipality	1,827	3,073
20	Folldal Municipality	1,569	1,266
21	Tolga Municipality	1,553	1,101
22	Engerdal Municipality	1,294	1,921
Total	Hedmark	196,966	27,388

Number of minorities (1st and 2nd gen.) in Hedmark by country of origin in 2017
Nationality	Population (2017)
Poland	2,204
Sweden	1,421
Somalia	1,125
Lithuania	1,119
Eritrea	948
Germany	746
Iraq	721
Thailand	694
Afghanistan	620
Syria	608
Denmark	605
Vietnam	572
Bosnia-Herzegovina	539
Iran	503
Netherlands	418
Russia	418
Kosovo	416
Philippines	369

== Districts ==
- Glåmdal
- Hedmarken
- Østerdalen
- Solør
- Vinger

== Cities ==
- Hamar
- Kongsvinger
- Brumunddal
- Elverum

== Parishes ==
- Alvdal
- Austmarka (Østmark)
- Brandval
- Brøttum
- Deset
- Drevsjø (Drevsjøhytte)
- Eidskog
- Elverum
- Engerdal
- Finnskog
- Folldal
- Furnes
- Gjesås
- Grue
- Hamar
- Helgøy Kapell
- Hof
- Innset
- Kongsvinger
- Kvikne
- Lundersæter
- Løten
- Mo
- Nes
- Nord-Odal
- Nordre-Osen
- Opstad
- Os (Dalsbygda)
- Ottestad
- Rendal
- Rendalen
- Revholt
- Ringsaker
- Romedal
- Sand
- Sollia
- Stange
- Stavsjø (Ballishol)
- Stor Elvdal
- Strand
- Strøm
- Sør-Odal
- Sør Osen
- Tangen
- Tolga
- Trysil
- Tylldal
- Tynset
- Ulleren
- Vallset (Tomter)
- Vang
- Veldre
- Vestmarka
- Vingelen
- Vinger
- Våler
- Ytre Rendal
- Øvre Engerdal
- Øvre Rendal
- Åmot
- Åsnes
- Odalen Branch (LDS, 1857-1873)
- Trysil Frimenighet, (1859-1891)

== Villages ==
- Atna
- Bergesida
- Bergset
- Braskereidfoss
- Brumunddal
- Disenå
- Drevsjø
- Espa
- Flisa
- Furnes
- Fådalen
- Fåset
- Galterud
- Grinder
- Hanestad
- Hekne
- Heimdal
- Heradsbygd
- Hjellum
- Hodalen
- Ilseng
- Ingeberg
- Innbygda
- Kirkenær
- Kjellmyra
- Knapper
- Koppang
- Kvål
- Kylstad
- Lundersæter
- Magnor
- Matrand
- Mesnali
- Mo (Gardvik)
- Moelv
- Namnå
- Nybergsund
- Os i Østerdalen
- Otnes
- Ottestad
- Plassmoen
- Rena
- Ridabu
- Risberget
- Rotberget
- Roverud
- Rudshøgda
- Sand (Sagstua)
- Sander
- Sandvika
- Sinnerud
- Sjølisand
- Skarnes
- Skasenden
- Skotterud
- Slettmoen
- Sorken
- Starhellinga
- Svullrya
- Tangen
- Telneset
- Tylldalen
- Tørberget
- Unset
- Vangsås/Slemsrud
- Våler
- Østby
- Øversjødalen
- Åbogen
- Ådalsbruk
- Åkre
- Åkrestrømmen
- Åsta

== Former municipalities ==
- Brandval Municipality
- Furnes Municipality
- Hof Municipality
- Kvikne Municipality
- Nes Municipality
- Rendal Municipality
- Romedal Municipality
- Sollia Municipality
- Tolga-Os Municipality
- Vang Municipality
- Vinger Municipality
- Ytre Rendal Municipality
- Øvre Rendal Municipality
- Åsnes og Våler Municipality
