= Rendal Municipality =

Former municipality in Hedmark, Norway

Rendal Municipality Rendal herred
- Former municipality
- Hedmark within Norway

- Rendal within Hedmark
- Coordinates: 61°53′29″N 11°04′44″E
- Country: Norway
- County: Hedmark
- District: Østerdalen
- Established: 1 Jan 1838
  - Created as: Formannskapsdistrikt
- Disestablished: 1 Jan 1880
  - Succeeded by: Ytre Rendal Municipality and Øvre Rendal Municipality
- Administrative centre: Bergset

Government
  - Mayor (1872–1879): Ola Jonsen Høye

Area (upon dissolution)
  - Total: 4,201 km^{2} (1,622 sq mi)
- Highest elevation: 1,754.8 m (5,757 ft)

Population (1880)
  - Total: 3,529
  - Density: 0.8400/km^{2} (2.176/sq mi)
- Demonym: Rendøl
- Time zone: UTC+01:00 (CET)
  - Summer (DST): UTC+02:00 (CEST)
- ISO 3166 code: NO-0432

Rendal is a former municipality in the old Hedmark county, Norway. The 4,201-square-kilometre (1,622 sq mi) municipality existed from 1838 until its dissolution in 1880 when it was divided into Ytre Rendal Municipality and Øvre Rendal Municipality. The administrative centre was the village of Bergset where Øvre Rendal Church is located.

== General information ==
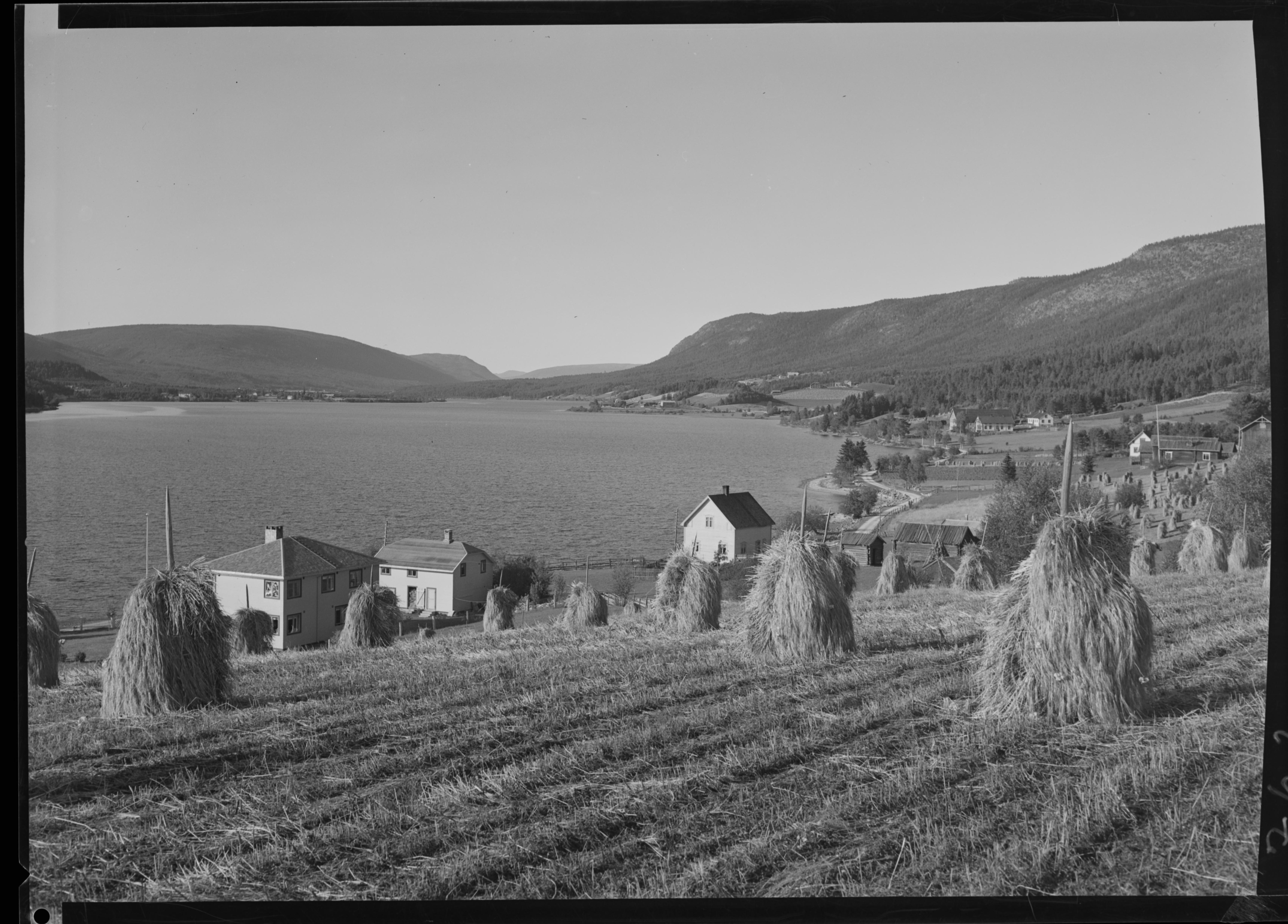
View of a farm along the lake Lomnessjøen

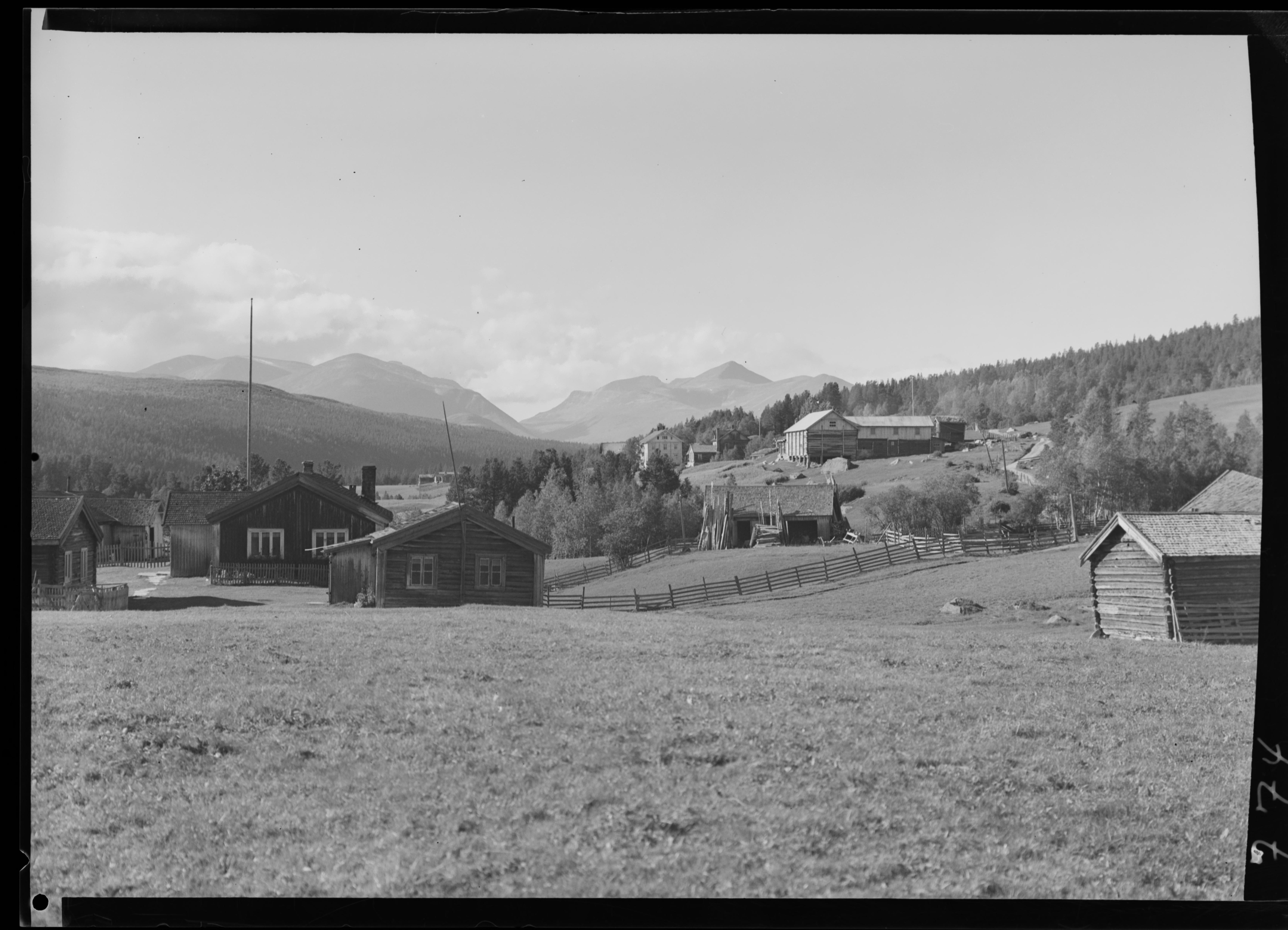
View of a farm in the Rendalen valley

The parish of Rendal was established as a municipality on 1 January 1838 (see formannskapsdistrikt law). This municipality was quite large, spanning 4,201 square kilometres (1,622 sq mi) from the Østerdalen valley to the border with Sweden. During the 1870s, discussions began on dividing the large municipality. On 1 January 1880, Rendal Municipality was split in two to create the new Øvre Rendal Municipality (population: 1,868) in the north and Ytre Rendal Municipality (population: 1,661) in the south.

During the 1960s, there were many municipal mergers across Norway due to the work of the Schei Committee. On 1 January 1965, a new Rendalen Municipality was established, but it did not have quite the same boundaries as the old Rendal municipality.

=== Name ===
The municipality (originally the parish) is named after the Rendalen valley (Old Norse: Reindalr) which is located in the municipality. The first element is rein which means "reindeer". The last element is dalr which means "valley" or "dale". The river Rena runs through the valley and it is not known if the valley was named after the river or if the river was named after the valley. A nearby mountain Renafjellet also has a similar name.

=== Churches ===
The Church of Norway had two parishes (sokn) within Rendal Municipality. At the time of the municipal dissolution, it was part of the Rendal prestegjeld and the Nord-Østerdal prosti (deanery) in the Diocese of Hamar.

Churches in Rendal
Parish (sokn)	Church name	Location of the church	Year built
Ytre Rendal	Ytre Rendal Church	Otnes	1751
Øvre Rendal	Øvre Rendal Church	Bergset	1759

== Geography ==
Rendal Municipality was located in the upper Østerdalen valley. Tynset Municipality was to the northwest, Tolga Municipality was to the northeast, Särna Municipality in Sweden was to the east, Trysil Municipality was to the southeast, Aamot Municipality was to the south, and Storelvedalen Municipality was to the west. The highest point in the municipality was the 1,754.8-metre (5,757 ft) tall mountain Sølen.

== Government ==
During its existence, Rendal Municipality was governed by a municipal council of directly elected representatives. The mayor was indirectly elected by a vote of the municipal council. The municipality was under the jurisdiction of the Eidsivating Court of Appeal.

=== Mayors ===
The mayor (Norwegian: ordfører) of Rendal Municipality was the political leader of the municipality and the chairperson of the municipal council. The following people have held this position:

- 1838–1845: Ole Johan Storm
- 1845–1853: Jens Simensen Høye
- 1854–1857: Simen Jensen Høye
- 1858–1859: Jacob Eriksen Haarset
- 1860–1861: Ola Jonsen Høye
- 1862–1869: Simen Jensen Høye
- 1870–1871: Johan Jensen Høye
- 1872–1879: Ola Jonsen Høye

== See also ==
- List of former municipalities of Norway
