= Øvre Rendal Municipality =

Former municipality in Hedmark, Norway

Øvre Rendal Municipality Øvre Rendal herred
- Former municipality
- Øvre Rendalen herred (historic name)
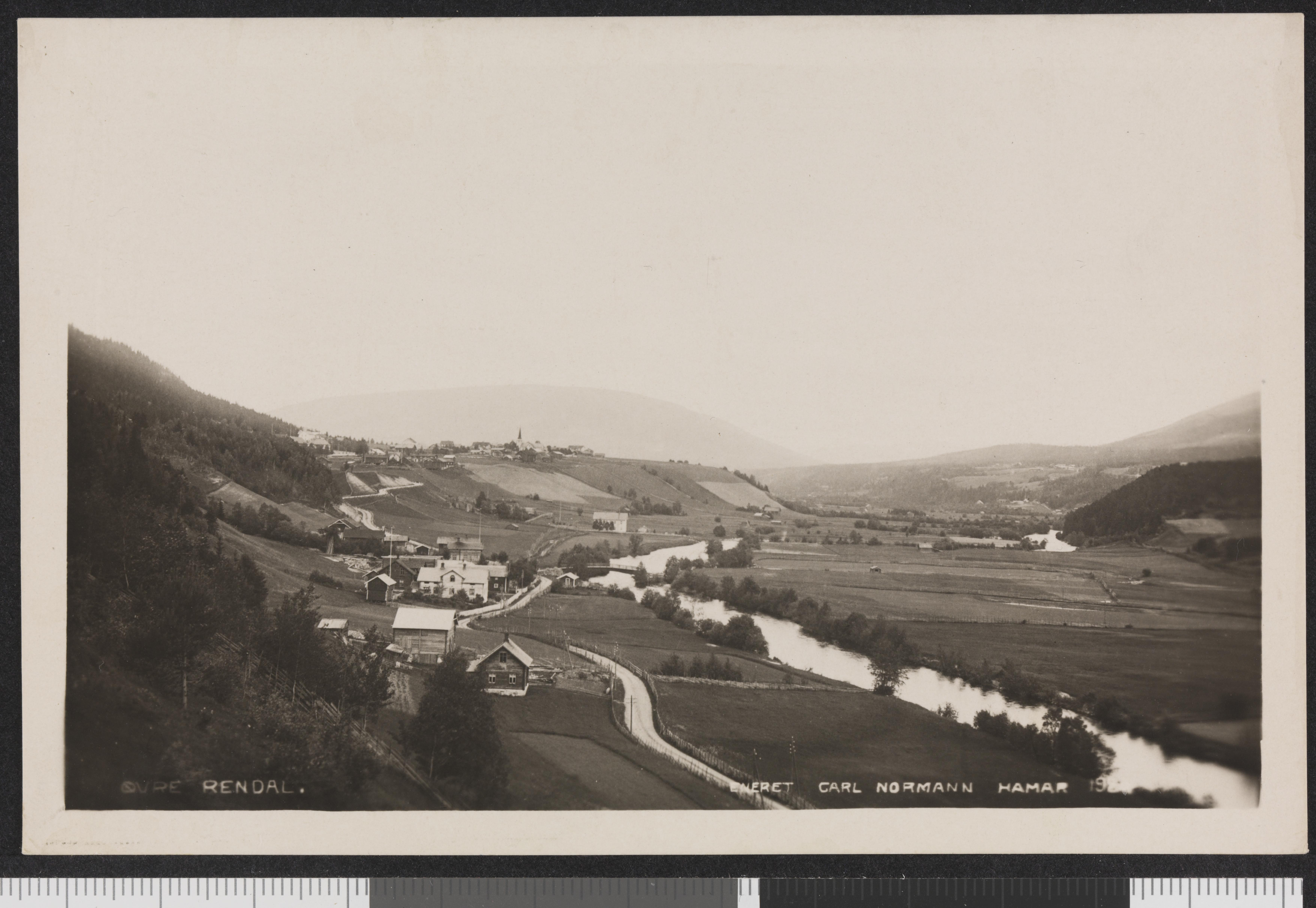
- View of Øvre Rendal (1924)

- Hedmark within Norway

- Øvre Rendal within Hedmark
- Coordinates: 61°53′29″N 11°04′44″E
- Country: Norway
- County: Hedmark
- District: Østerdalen
- Established: 1 Jan 1880
  - Preceded by: Rendal Municipality
- Disestablished: 1 Jan 1965
  - Succeeded by: Rendalen Municipality
- Administrative centre: Bergset

Government
  - Mayor (1963–1964): Asmund Sletten (Ap)

Area (upon dissolution)
  - Total: 1,829 km^{2} (706 sq mi)
  - Rank: #35 in Norway
- Highest elevation: 1,754.8 m (5,757 ft)

Population (1964)
  - Total: 1,665
  - Rank: #434 in Norway
  - Density: 0.9/km^{2} (2.3/sq mi)
  - Change (10 years): ▼ −9.2%
- Demonym: Rendøl

Official language
  - Norwegian form: Bokmål
- Time zone: UTC+01:00 (CET)
  - Summer (DST): UTC+02:00 (CEST)
- ISO 3166 code: NO-0433

Øvre Rendal is a former municipality in the old Hedmark county, Norway. The 1,829-square-kilometre (706 sq mi) municipality existed from 1880 until its dissolution in 1965. The area is now part of Rendalen Municipality in the traditional district of Østerdalen. The administrative centre was the village of Bergset where Øvre Rendal Church is located.

Prior to its dissolution in 1965, the 1,829-square-kilometre (706 sq mi) municipality was the 35th largest by area out of the 525 municipalities in Norway. Øvre Rendal Municipality was the 434th most populous municipality in Norway with a population of about 1,665. The municipality's population density was 0.9 inhabitants per square kilometre (2.3/sq mi) and its population had decreased by 9.2% over the previous 10-year period.

== General information ==
On 1 January 1838, the large Rendal Municipality was established. This municipality spanned 4,201 square kilometres (1,622 sq mi) from the Østerdalen valley to the border with Sweden. During the 1870s, discussions began on dividing the large municipality. On 1 January 1880, Rendal Municipality was split in two to create the new Øvre Rendal Municipality (population: 1,868) in the north and Ytre Rendal Municipality (population: 1,661) in the south. The new Øvre Rendal Municipality had an area of 2,521 square kilometres (973 sq mi).

On 1 January 1911, 692 square kilometres (267 sq mi) of eastern Øvre Rendal Municipality (population: 381) was removed from the municipality and merged with 330 square kilometres (130 sq mi) of eastern Ytre Rendal Municipality (population: 311), 750 square kilometres (290 sq mi) of southeastern Tolga Municipality (population: 201), and 168 square kilometres (65 sq mi) of northern Trysil Municipality (population: 291) to create the new Engerdal Municipality, located to the east of the remaining Øvre Rendal Municipality.

During the 1960s, there were many municipal mergers across Norway due to the work of the Schei Committee. On 1 January 1965, Øvre Rendal Municipality (population: 1,629) was merged with Ytre Rendal Municipality (population: 1,913) to create the new Rendalen Municipality.

=== Name ===
The municipality (originally the parish) is named after the Rendalen valley (Old Norse: Reindalr). In 1880, the large Rendal Municipality was divided to create two new municipalities. Both municipalities were named after the old municipality and to distinguish between the two, an additional word was added to the name. The word øvre was added to this name and the word ytre was added to the other municipality. The word øvre means "upper" (while ytre means "outer"). The first element of Rendal is rein which means "reindeer". The last element is dalr which means "valley" or "dale". The river Rena runs through the valley and it is not known if the valley was named after the river or if the river was named after the valley. A nearby mountain Renafjellet also has a similar name. Historically, the name of the municipality was spelled Øvre Rendalen. On 3 November 1917, a royal resolution changed the spelling of the name of the municipality to Øvre Rendal, removing the definite form ending -en.

=== Churches ===
The Church of Norway had one parish (sokn) within Øvre Rendal Municipality. At the time of the municipal dissolution, it was part of the Rendal prestegjeld and the Nord-Østerdal prosti (deanery) in the Diocese of Hamar.

Churches in Øvre Rendal
| Parish (sokn) | Church name | Location of the church | Year built |
|---|---|---|---|
| Øvre Rendal | Øvre Rendal Church | Bergset | 1759 |
| Øvre Rendal | Hanestad Chapel | Hanestad | 1926 |

== Geography ==
Øvre Rendal Municipality is located in the northern Østerdalen valley. Alvdal Municipality, Tynset Municipality, and Tolga Municipality were located to the north. Engerdal Municipality was located to the east, Ytre Rendal Municipality was located to the south, and Stor-Elvdal Municipality was located to the west. The highest point in the municipality was the 1,754.8-metre (5,757 ft) tall mountain Sølen, located on the border of Øvre Rendal Municipality and Ytre Rendal Municipality.

== Government ==
While it existed, Øvre Rendal Municipality was responsible for primary education (through 10th grade), outpatient health services, senior citizen services, welfare and other social services, zoning, economic development, and municipal roads and utilities. The municipality was governed by a municipal council of directly elected representatives. The mayor was indirectly elected by a vote of the municipal council. The municipality was under the jurisdiction of the Eidsivating Court of Appeal.

=== Municipal council ===
The municipal council (Herredsstyre) of Øvre Rendal Municipality was made up of 17 representatives that were elected to four year terms. The tables below show the historical composition of the council by political party.

Øvre Rendal herredsstyre 1963–1964
| Party name (in Norwegian) | Number of representatives |
|---|---|
| Labour Party (Arbeiderpartiet) | 10 |
| Communist Party (Kommunistiske Parti) | 6 |
| Joint List(s) of Non-Socialist Parties (Borgerlige Felleslister) | 1 |
| Total number of members: | 17 |

Øvre Rendal herredsstyre 1959–1963
| Party name (in Norwegian) | Number of representatives |
|---|---|
| Labour Party (Arbeiderpartiet) | 10 |
| Centre Party (Senterpartiet) | 6 |
| Joint List(s) of Non-Socialist Parties (Borgerlige Felleslister) | 1 |
| Total number of members: | 17 |

Øvre Rendal herredsstyre 1955–1959
| Party name (in Norwegian) | Number of representatives |
|---|---|
| Labour Party (Arbeiderpartiet) | 9 |
| Communist Party (Kommunistiske Parti) | 1 |
| Farmers' Party (Bondepartiet) | 5 |
| Joint List(s) of Non-Socialist Parties (Borgerlige Felleslister) | 2 |
| Total number of members: | 17 |

Øvre Rendal herredsstyre 1951–1955
| Party name (in Norwegian) | Number of representatives |
|---|---|
| Labour Party (Arbeiderpartiet) | 8 |
| Communist Party (Kommunistiske Parti) | 1 |
| Farmers' Party (Bondepartiet) | 6 |
| Joint List(s) of Non-Socialist Parties (Borgerlige Felleslister) | 1 |
| Total number of members: | 16 |

Øvre Rendal herredsstyre 1947–1951
| Party name (in Norwegian) | Number of representatives |
|---|---|
| Labour Party (Arbeiderpartiet) | 7 |
| Communist Party (Kommunistiske Parti) | 2 |
| Farmers' Party (Bondepartiet) | 6 |
| Joint list of the Liberal Party (Venstre) and the Radical People's Party (Radikale Folkepartiet) | 1 |
| Total number of members: | 16 |

Øvre Rendal herredsstyre 1945–1947
| Party name (in Norwegian) | Number of representatives |
|---|---|
| Labour Party (Arbeiderpartiet) | 10 |
| Joint List(s) of Non-Socialist Parties (Borgerlige Felleslister) | 6 |
| Total number of members: | 16 |

Øvre Rendal herredsstyre 1937–1941*
| Party name (in Norwegian) | Number of representatives |
|---|---|
| Labour Party (Arbeiderpartiet) | 9 |
| Conservative Party (Høyre) | 1 |
| Farmers' Party (Bondepartiet) | 5 |
| Liberal Party (Venstre) | 1 |
| Total number of members: | 16 |
Note: Due to the German occupation of Norway during World War II, no elections were held for new municipal councils until after the war ended in 1945.

=== Mayors ===
The mayor (Norwegian: ordfører) of Øvre Rendal Municipality was the political leader of the municipality and the chairperson of the municipal council. The following people have held this position:

- 1880–1881: Erik Olsen Haugseth
- 1882–1885: Erik Simensen Høye
- 1886–1889: Erik Nilsen Haarset
- 1890–1893: Erik Simensen Høye
- 1894–1897: Ola Eriksen Undset
- 1898–1904: David Kvile (V)
- 1905–1910: Hans Bergseth
- 1911–1913: David Kvile (V)
- 1914–1919: Martin Hornseth (H)
- 1920–1922: Torleif Bjøntegaard (H)
- 1923–1928: Johannes Myrberg (Bp)
- 1929–1931: M.O. Undseth (Ap)
- 1932–1934: Jens Løken (Bp)
- 1935–1940: Knut Vardenær Brøten (Ap)
- 1941–1942: Sigurd Haga (NS)
- 1943–1943: Lidvin Hornseth (NS)
- 1943–1945: John Sørhuus (NS)
- 1945–1947: Knut Vardenær Brøten (Ap)
- 1948–1951: Petter Olaus Kristiansen (Ap)
- 1952–1963: Knut Vardenær Brøten (Ap)
- 1963–1964: Asmund Sletten (Ap)

== See also ==
- List of former municipalities of Norway
