= Harrsjøen =

Lake in Rendalen, Norway

- Harsjøen
- Interactive map of the lake
- Location: Rendalen Municipality, Innlandet
- Coordinates: 61°51′30″N 11°1′33″E
- Primary outflows: Hårenna river
- Basin countries: Norway
- Max. length: 3.7 kilometres (2.3 mi)
- Max. width: 800 metres (2,600 ft)
- Surface area: 2.31 km^{2} (0.89 sq mi)
- Shore length^{1}: 9.25 kilometres (5.75 mi)
- Surface elevation: 676 metres (2,218 ft)
- References: NVE
- ^{1} Shore length is not a well-defined measure.

Harrsjøen is a lake in Rendalen Municipality in Innlandet county, Norway. The 2.31-square-kilometre (0.89 sq mi) lake lies about 3 kilometres (1.9 mi) southwest of the village of Bergset and about 8 kilometres (5.0 mi) northeast of the village of Hanestad. The lake has an outlet in the south through the river Hårenna, a tributary of the river Renaelva.

== See also ==
- List of lakes in Norway
