= Ytre Rendal Municipality =

Former municipality in Hedmark, Norway

Ytre Rendal Municipality Ytre Rendal herred
- Former municipality
- Ytre Rendalen herred (historic name)
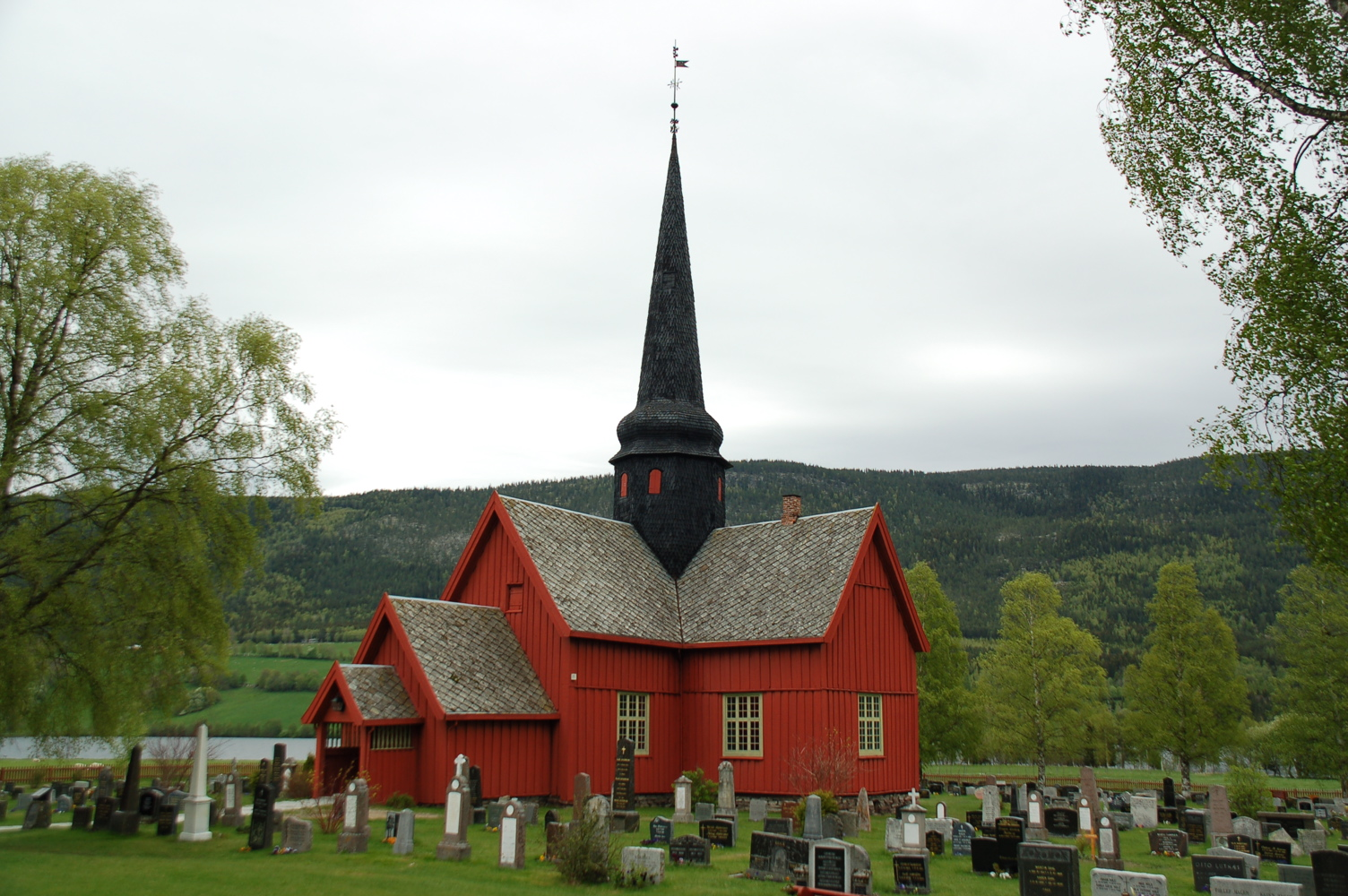
- View of the local Ytre Rendal Church

- Hedmark within Norway

- Ytre Rendal within Hedmark
- Coordinates: 61°46′06″N 11°10′26″E
- Country: Norway
- County: Hedmark
- District: Østerdalen
- Established: 1 Jan 1880
  - Preceded by: Rendal Municipality
- Disestablished: 1 Jan 1965
  - Succeeded by: Rendalen Municipality
- Administrative centre: Otnes

Government
  - Mayor (1955–1964): Erik Husfloen (Ap)

Area (upon dissolution)
  - Total: 1,350 km^{2} (520 sq mi)
  - Rank: #61 in Norway
- Highest elevation: 1,754.8 m (5,757 ft)

Population (1964)
  - Total: 1,925
  - Rank: #403 in Norway
  - Density: 1.4/km^{2} (3.6/sq mi)
  - Change (10 years): ▼ −6.4%
- Demonym: Rendøl

Official language
  - Norwegian form: Neutral
- Time zone: UTC+01:00 (CET)
  - Summer (DST): UTC+02:00 (CEST)
- ISO 3166 code: NO-0432

Ytre Rendal is a former municipality in the old Hedmark county, Norway. The 1,350-square-kilometre (520 sq mi) municipality existed from 1880 until its dissolution in 1965. The area is now part of Rendalen Municipality in the traditional district of Østerdalen. The administrative centre was the village of Otnes where Ytre Rendal Church is located.

Prior to its dissolution in 1965, the 1,350-square-kilometre (520 sq mi) municipality was the 16th largest by area out of the 525 municipalities in Norway. Ytre Rendal Municipality was the 403rd most populous municipality in Norway with a population of about 1,925. The municipality's population density was 1.4 inhabitants per square kilometre (3.6/sq mi) and its population had decreased by 6.4% over the previous 10-year period.

== General information ==
On 1 January 1838, the large Rendal Municipality was established. This municipality spanned 4,201 square kilometres (1,622 sq mi) from the Østerdalen valley to the border with Sweden. During the 1870s, discussions began on dividing the large municipality. On 1 January 1880, Rendal Municipality was split in two to create the new Øvre Rendal Municipality (population: 1,868) in the north and Ytre Rendal Municipality (population: 1,661) in the south. The new Ytre Rendal Municipality had an area of 1,680 square kilometres (650 sq mi).

On 1 January 1911, 330 square kilometres (130 sq mi) of eastern Ytre Rendal Municipality (population: 311) was removed from the municipality and merged with 692 square kilometres (267 sq mi) of eastern Øvre Rendal Municipality (population: 381), 750 square kilometres (290 sq mi) of southeastern Tolga Municipality (population: 201), and 168 square kilometres (65 sq mi) of northern Trysil Municipality (population: 291) to create the new Engerdal Municipality, located to the east of the remaining Øvre Rendal Municipality.

During the 1960s, there were many municipal mergers across Norway due to the work of the Schei Committee. On 1 January 1965, Øvre Rendal Municipality (population: 1,629) was merged with Ytre Rendal Municipality (population: 1,913) to create the new Rendalen Municipality.

=== Name ===
The municipality (originally the parish) is named after the Rendalen valley (Old Norse: Reindalr). In 1880, the large Rendal Municipality was divided to create two new municipalities. Both municipalities were named after the old municipality and to distinguish between the two, an additional word was added to the name. The word ytre was added to this name and the word øvre was added to the other municipality. The word ytre means "outer" (while øvre means "upper"). The first element of Rendal is rein which means "reindeer". The last element is dalr which means "valley" or "dale". The river Rena runs through the valley and it is not known if the valley was named after the river or if the river was named after the valley. A nearby mountain Renafjellet also has a similar name. Historically, the name of the municipality was spelled Ytre Rendalen. On 3 November 1917, a royal resolution changed the spelling of the name of the municipality to Ytre Rendal, removing the definite form ending -en.

=== Churches ===
The Church of Norway had one parish (sokn) within Ytre Rendal Municipality. At the time of the municipal dissolution, it was part of the Rendal prestegjeld and the Nord-Østerdal prosti (deanery) in the Diocese of Hamar.

Churches in Ytre Rendal
Parish (sokn)	Church name	Location of the church	Year built
Ytre Rendal	Ytre Rendal Church	Otnes	1751
Ytre Rendal	Sjøli Chapel	Sjølisand	1914

== Geography ==
Ytre Rendal Municipality is located in the northern Østerdalen valley. Øvre Rendal Municipality was located to the north, Engerdal Municipality was located to the east, Åmot Municipality was located to the south, Trysil Municipality was to the southeast, and Stor-Elvdal Municipality was located to the west. The highest point in the municipality was the 1,754.8-metre (5,757 ft) tall mountain Sølen, located on the border of Ytre Rendal Municipality and Øvre Rendal Municipality.

== Government ==
While it existed, Ytre Rendal Municipality was responsible for primary education (through 10th grade), outpatient health services, senior citizen services, welfare and other social services, zoning, economic development, and municipal roads and utilities. The municipality was governed by a municipal council of directly elected representatives. The mayor was indirectly elected by a vote of the municipal council. The municipality was under the jurisdiction of the Eidsivating Court of Appeal.

=== Municipal council ===
The municipal council (Herredsstyre) of Ytre Rendal Municipality was made up of 17 representatives that were elected to four year terms. The tables below show the historical composition of the council by political party.

Ytre Rendal herredsstyre 1963–1964
Party name (in Norwegian)	Number of representatives
Labour Party (Arbeiderpartiet)	12
Communist Party (Kommunistiske Parti)	1
Centre Party (Senterpartiet)	3
Socialist People's Party (Sosialistisk Folkeparti)	1
Total number of members:	17
Note: On 1 January 1965, Ytre Rendal Municipality became part of Rendalen Municipality.

Ytre Rendal herredsstyre 1959–1963
Party name (in Norwegian)	Number of representatives
Labour Party (Arbeiderpartiet)	13
Communist Party (Kommunistiske Parti)	1
Centre Party (Senterpartiet)	3
Total number of members:	17

Ytre Rendal herredsstyre 1955–1959
Party name (in Norwegian)	Number of representatives
Labour Party (Arbeiderpartiet)	12
Communist Party (Kommunistiske Parti)	1
Farmers' Party (Bondepartiet)	4
Total number of members:	17

Ytre Rendal herredsstyre 1951–1955
Party name (in Norwegian)	Number of representatives
Labour Party (Arbeiderpartiet)	12
Communist Party (Kommunistiske Parti)	1
Farmers' Party (Bondepartiet)	3
Total number of members:	16

Ytre Rendal herredsstyre 1947–1951
Party name (in Norwegian)	Number of representatives
Labour Party (Arbeiderpartiet)	12
Communist Party (Kommunistiske Parti)	2
Farmers' Party (Bondepartiet)	2
Total number of members:	16

Ytre Rendal herredsstyre 1945–1947
Party name (in Norwegian)	Number of representatives
Labour Party (Arbeiderpartiet)	12
Communist Party (Kommunistiske Parti)	2
Joint List(s) of Non-Socialist Parties (Borgerlige Felleslister)	2
Total number of members:	16

Ytre Rendal herredsstyre 1937–1941*
Party name (in Norwegian)	Number of representatives
Labour Party (Arbeiderpartiet)	13
Joint List(s) of Non-Socialist Parties (Borgerlige Felleslister)	3
Total number of members:	16
Note: Due to the German occupation of Norway during World War II, no elections were held for new municipal councils until after the war ended in 1945.

=== Mayors ===
The mayor (Norwegian: ordfører) of Ytre Rendal Municipality was the political leader of the municipality and the chairperson of the municipal council. The following people have held this position:

- 1880–1882: Ola Balstad
- 1883–1891: Karl Kværness
- 1891–1893: Melchior Kværnes
- 1893–1894: Simon Sjølie (V)
- 1895–1898: Sæming Hole
- 1899–1904: Karl Akre (V)
- 1905–1907: Hans Grindal
- 1908–1913: Karl Akre(H)
- 1914–1934: Peder Edvard Vorum (ArbDem)
- 1935–1941: Helge Berger (Ap)
- 1941–1941: Peder Edvard Vorum (NS)
- 1941–1944: Ola Hole (NS)
- 1945–1945: Johannes Misterosen (NS)
- 1945–1955: Helge Berger (Ap)
- 1955–1964: Erik Husfloen (Ap)

== See also ==
- List of former municipalities of Norway
- List of notable people from Ytre Rendal Municipality
