= Rendalen Municipality =

Municipality in Innlandet, Norway

Rendalen Municipality Rendalen kommune
- Municipality
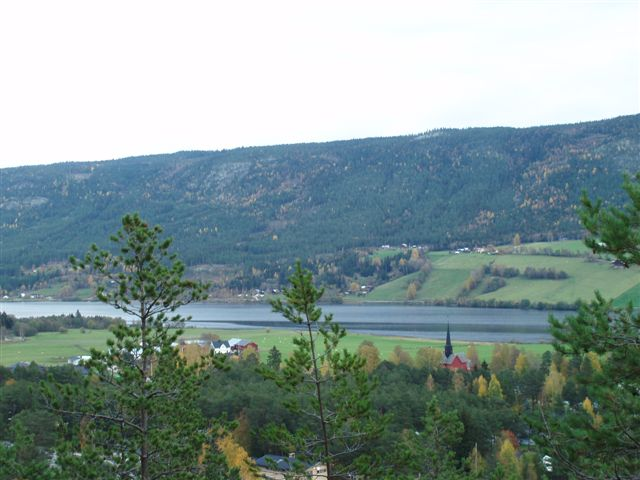
- View of the village of Otnes and the lake Lomnessjøen

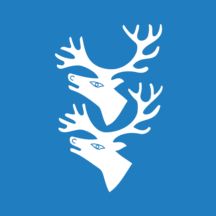
- Flag Coat of arms

- Innlandet within Norway

- Rendalen within Innlandet
- Coordinates: 61°51′34″N 11°10′34″E
- Country: Norway
- County: Innlandet
- District: Østerdalen
- Established: 1 Jan 1965
  - Preceded by: Ytre Rendal and Øvre Rendal
- Administrative centre: Bergset

Government
  - Mayor (2019): Linda Døsen (Ap)

Area
  - Total: 3,179.51 km^{2} (1,227.62 sq mi)
  - Land: 3,060.84 km^{2} (1,181.80 sq mi)
  - Water: 118.67 km^{2} (45.82 sq mi) 3.7%
  - Rank: #13 in Norway
- Highest elevation: 1,754.8 m (5,757 ft)

Population (2025)
  - Total: 1,846
  - Rank: #292 in Norway
  - Density: 0.6/km^{2} (1.6/sq mi)
  - Change (10 years): ▼ −2.4%
- Demonym: Rendøl

Official language
  - Norwegian form: Bokmål
- Time zone: UTC+01:00 (CET)
  - Summer (DST): UTC+02:00 (CEST)
- ISO 3166 code: NO-3424
- Website: Official website

Rendalen is a municipality in Innlandet county, Norway. It is located in the traditional district of Østerdalen. The administrative centre of the municipality is the village of Bergset. Other villages in the municipality include Hanestad, Otnes, Sjølisand, Unset, Åkre, and Åkrestrømmen.

The 3,180-square-kilometre (1,230 sq mi) municipality is the 13th largest by area out of the 357 municipalities in Norway. Rendalen is the 292nd most populous municipality in Norway with a population of 1,846. The municipality's population density is 0.6 inhabitants per square kilometre (1.6/sq mi) and its population has decreased by 2.4% over the previous 10-year period.

== General information ==
The municipality of Rendalen was established on 1 January 1965 when the old Ytre Rendal Municipality (population: 1,913) and Øvre Rendal Municipality (population: 1,629) were merged. On 1 January 1984, the unpopulated Spekedalen valley was transferred from Tynset Municipality to Rendalen.

Historically, the municipality was part of Hedmark county. On 1 January 2020, the municipality became a part of the newly-formed Innlandet county (after Hedmark and Oppland counties were merged).

=== Name ===
The municipality (originally the parish) is named after the Rendalen valley (Old Norse: Reindalr) which is located in the municipality. The first element is rein which means "reindeer". The last element is dalr which means "valley" or "dale". The river Rena runs through the valley and it is not known if the valley was named after the river or if the river was named after the valley. A nearby mountain Renafjellet also has a similar name.

=== Coat of arms ===
The coat of arms was granted on 2 June 1989. The official blazon is "Azure, two reindeer heads argent in pale" (Norwegian: I blått to sølv reinsdyrhoder, 1-1). This means the arms have a blue field (background) and the charge is two reindeer heads. The charge has a tincture of argent which means it is commonly colored white, but if it is made out of metal, then silver is used. The design symbolizes the importance of reindeer farming in the community. The arms are a canting since the name Rendalen is derived from the word for reindeer. There are two heads to represent Øvre Rendal Municipality and Ytre Rendal Municipality which were merged in 1965 to form this municipality. The arms were designed by Arvid Sveen. The municipal flag has the same design as the coat of arms.

=== Churches ===
The Church of Norway has four parishes (sokn) within Rendalen Municipality. It is part of the Nord-Østerdal prosti (deanery) in the Diocese of Hamar.

Churches in Rendalen
Parish (sokn)	Church name	Location of the church	Year built
Hanestad	Hanestad Church	Hanestad	1926
Sjøli	Sjøli Church	Sjølisand	1914
Ytre Rendal	Ytre Rendal Church	Otnes	1751
Øvre Rendal	Øvre Rendal Church	Bergset	1759

== Geography ==
The municipality has an area of 3,180 square kilometres (1,227.8 mi^{2}) which makes it the 2nd largest municipality (after Ullensvang Municipality) in Southern Norway. The 11 largest municipalities are all in rural Northern Norway and they are followed by Ullensvang and Rendalen. Rendalen municipality is bordered on the northwest by Alvdal Municipality and Tynset Municipality, in the north by Tolga Municipality, in the east by Engerdal Municipality, in the south by Trysil Municipality and Åmot Municipality, and in the west by Stor-Elvdal Municipality.

Rendalen municipality encompasses most of the Rendalen valley, a side valley of the large Østerdalen valley which dominates Eastern Norway. In addition, the municipality encompasses the northern part of the lake Storsjøen as well as the lakes Sølensjøen, Galtsjøen, Harrsjøen, and Lomnessjøen. The highest point in the municipality is the 1,754.8-metre (5,757 ft) tall mountain Sølen. Another notable mountain in the municipality is Elgspiggen. The rivers Glomma and Renaelva both flow through the municipality.

== Government ==
Rendalen Municipality is responsible for primary education (through 10th grade), outpatient health services, senior citizen services, welfare and other social services, zoning, economic development, and municipal roads and utilities. The municipality is governed by a municipal council of directly elected representatives. The mayor is indirectly elected by a vote of the municipal council. The municipality is under the jurisdiction of the Hedmarken og Østerdal District Court and the Eidsivating Court of Appeal.

=== Municipal council ===
The municipal council (Kommunestyre) of Rendalen Municipality is made up of 17 representatives that are elected to four year terms. The tables below show the current and historical composition of the council by political party.

Rendalen kommunestyre 2023–2027
Party name (in Norwegian)	Number of representatives
Labour Party (Arbeiderpartiet)	8
Conservative Party (Høyre)	2
Centre Party (Senterpartiet)	6
Socialist Left Party (Sosialistisk Venstreparti)	1
Total number of members:	17

Rendalen kommunestyre 2019–2023
Party name (in Norwegian)	Number of representatives
Labour Party (Arbeiderpartiet)	9
Conservative Party (Høyre)	1
Centre Party (Senterpartiet)	6
Socialist Left Party (Sosialistisk Venstreparti)	1
Total number of members:	17

Rendalen kommunestyre 2015–2019
Party name (in Norwegian)	Number of representatives
Labour Party (Arbeiderpartiet)	8
Conservative Party (Høyre)	1
Centre Party (Senterpartiet)	7
Socialist Left Party (Sosialistisk Venstreparti)	1
Total number of members:	17

Rendalen kommunestyre 2011–2015
Party name (in Norwegian)	Number of representatives
Labour Party (Arbeiderpartiet)	8
Conservative Party (Høyre)	1
Centre Party (Senterpartiet)	6
Socialist Left Party (Sosialistisk Venstreparti)	2
Total number of members:	17

Rendalen kommunestyre 2007–2011
Party name (in Norwegian)	Number of representatives
Labour Party (Arbeiderpartiet)	9
Conservative Party (Høyre)	1
Centre Party (Senterpartiet)	6
Socialist Left Party (Sosialistisk Venstreparti)	2
Rendalen Free Voters (Rendalen Frie velgere)	1
Total number of members:	19

Rendalen kommunestyre 2003–2007
Party name (in Norwegian)	Number of representatives
Labour Party (Arbeiderpartiet)	7
Conservative Party (Høyre)	1
Centre Party (Senterpartiet)	8
Socialist Left Party (Sosialistisk Venstreparti)	2
Rendalen Free Voters (Rendalen Frie Velgere)	1
Total number of members:	19

Rendalen kommunestyre 1999–2003
Party name (in Norwegian)	Number of representatives
Labour Party (Arbeiderpartiet)	8
Centre Party (Senterpartiet)	8
Socialist Left Party (Sosialistisk Venstreparti)	1
Cross-party common list (Tverrpolitisk samlingsliste)	2
Total number of members:	19

Rendalen kommunestyre 1995–1999
Party name (in Norwegian)	Number of representatives
Labour Party (Arbeiderpartiet)	9
Conservative Party (Høyre)	1
Centre Party (Senterpartiet)	6
Socialist Left Party (Sosialistisk Venstreparti)	1
Rendalen Free Voters (Rendalen frie velgere)	2
Total number of members:	19

Rendalen kommunestyre 1991–1995
Party name (in Norwegian)	Number of representatives
Labour Party (Arbeiderpartiet)	7
Conservative Party (Høyre)	1
Centre Party (Senterpartiet)	3
Socialist Left Party (Sosialistisk Venstreparti)	2
Free Voters List (Frie velgeres liste)	2
Total number of members:	15

Rendalen kommunestyre 1987–1991
Party name (in Norwegian)	Number of representatives
Labour Party (Arbeiderpartiet)	14
Conservative Party (Høyre)	2
Centre Party (Senterpartiet)	6
Socialist Left Party (Sosialistisk Venstreparti)	1
Total number of members:	23

Rendalen kommunestyre 1983–1987
Party name (in Norwegian)	Number of representatives
Labour Party (Arbeiderpartiet)	15
Conservative Party (Høyre)	2
Centre Party (Senterpartiet)	5
Socialist Left Party (Sosialistisk Venstreparti)	1
Total number of members:	23

Rendalen kommunestyre 1979–1983
Party name (in Norwegian)	Number of representatives
Labour Party (Arbeiderpartiet)	15
Conservative Party (Høyre)	1
Centre Party (Senterpartiet)	4
Socialist Left Party (Sosialistisk Venstreparti)	1
Local List (Bygde-list)	2
Total number of members:	23

Rendalen kommunestyre 1975–1979
Party name (in Norwegian)	Number of representatives
Labour Party (Arbeiderpartiet)	15
Conservative Party (Høyre)	1
Centre Party (Senterpartiet)	6
Socialist Left Party (Sosialistisk Venstreparti)	1
Total number of members:	23

Rendalen kommunestyre 1971–1975
Party name (in Norwegian)	Number of representatives
Labour Party (Arbeiderpartiet)	15
Centre Party (Senterpartiet)	6
Joint List(s) of Non-Socialist Parties (Borgerlige Felleslister)	1
Socialist common list (Venstresosialistiske felleslister)	1
Total number of members:	23

Rendalen kommunestyre 1967–1971
Party name (in Norwegian)	Number of representatives
Labour Party (Arbeiderpartiet)	10
Centre Party (Senterpartiet)	6
Socialist People's Party (Sosialistisk Folkeparti)	1
List of workers, fishermen, and small farmholders (Arbeidere, fiskere, småbrukere liste)	5
Joint List(s) of Non-Socialist Parties (Borgerlige Felleslister)	1
Total number of members:	23

Rendalen kommunestyre 1965–1967
Party name (in Norwegian)	Number of representatives
Labour Party (Arbeiderpartiet)	22
Communist Party (Kommunistiske Parti)	7
Centre Party (Senterpartiet)	3
Socialist People's Party (Sosialistisk Folkeparti)	1
Joint List(s) of Non-Socialist Parties (Borgerlige Felleslister)	1
Total number of members:	34
Note: On 1 January 1965, Rendalen Municipality was created by the merger of Ytre Rendal Municipality and Øvre Rendal Municipality. The first municipal council for 1965-1967 included the members of both of the preceding councils of the old municipalities.

=== Mayors ===
The mayor (Norwegian: ordfører) of Rendalen Municipality is the political leader of the municipality and the chairperson of the municipal council. Here is a list of people who have held this position:

- 1965–1967: Erik Husfloen (Ap)
- 1968–1977: Kjell Borgen (Ap)
- 1978–1979: Otto Tobro (Ap)
- 1980–1991: Steinar Berget (Ap)
- 1992–1995: Sindre Undseth (Ap)
- 1995–2007: Erling Myhre (Sp)
- 2007–2019: Norvald Illevold (Ap)
- 2019–present: Linda Døsen (Ap)

== Economy ==
The primary occupations are in farming and logging, but tourism is also important. The Renåfjellet mountain area provides for excellent alpine hiking.

== Notable people ==
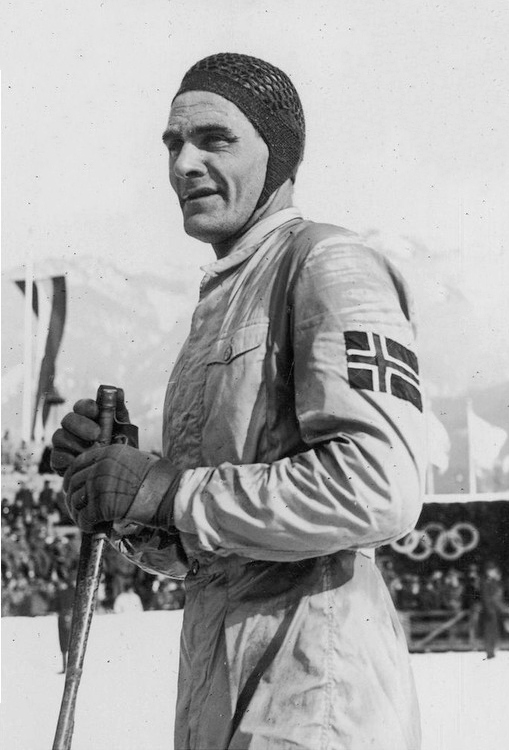
Oddbjorn Hagen, 1936

- Johan Reinhardt (1778 in Rendalen – 1845), a professor of zoology at Copenhagen University
- Gustav Storm (1845 in Rendalen – 1903), a historian and academic
- Jacob Breda Bull (1853 in Rendalen – 1930), an author, journalist, and editor
- David P. Kvile (1861–1918), a teacher, farmer, politician and teacher in Øvre Rendal
- Peder E. Vorum (1884–1970), an educator, politician, mayor of Ytre Rendal from 1913 to 1934, member of Nasjonal Samling in 1940, and collaborator during WWII who was convicted of treason in 1948
- Malfred Bergseth (1895–1966), trade unionist
- Ottar E. Akre (1896 in Ytre Rendal – 1992), an accordionist, composer, and educator
- Sigurd Akre-Aas (1897 in Ytre Rendal – 1968), a fencer who competed at the 1924 and 1928 Summer Olympics
- Oddbjørn Hagen (1908 in Ytre Rendal – 1983), a skier who competed at the 1936 Winter Olympics, gold medal winner in the Nordic combined, and twice silver medalist in cross-country skiing
- Kjell Borgen (1939–1996), a politician, former Minister of Transport, and secondary school teacher in Rendalen from 1962 to 1966
- Ola Otnes (born 1951 in Rendalen), an actor
- Guren Hagen, (Norwegian Wiki) (born 1959 in Rendalen), a musician

== International relations ==
=== Twin towns – Sister cities ===
Rendalen has sister city agreements with the following places:

- - Aalborg, Region Nordjylland, Denmark
- - Liperi, Itä-Suomi, Finland
- - Orsa, Dalarna County, Sweden

== Media gallery ==
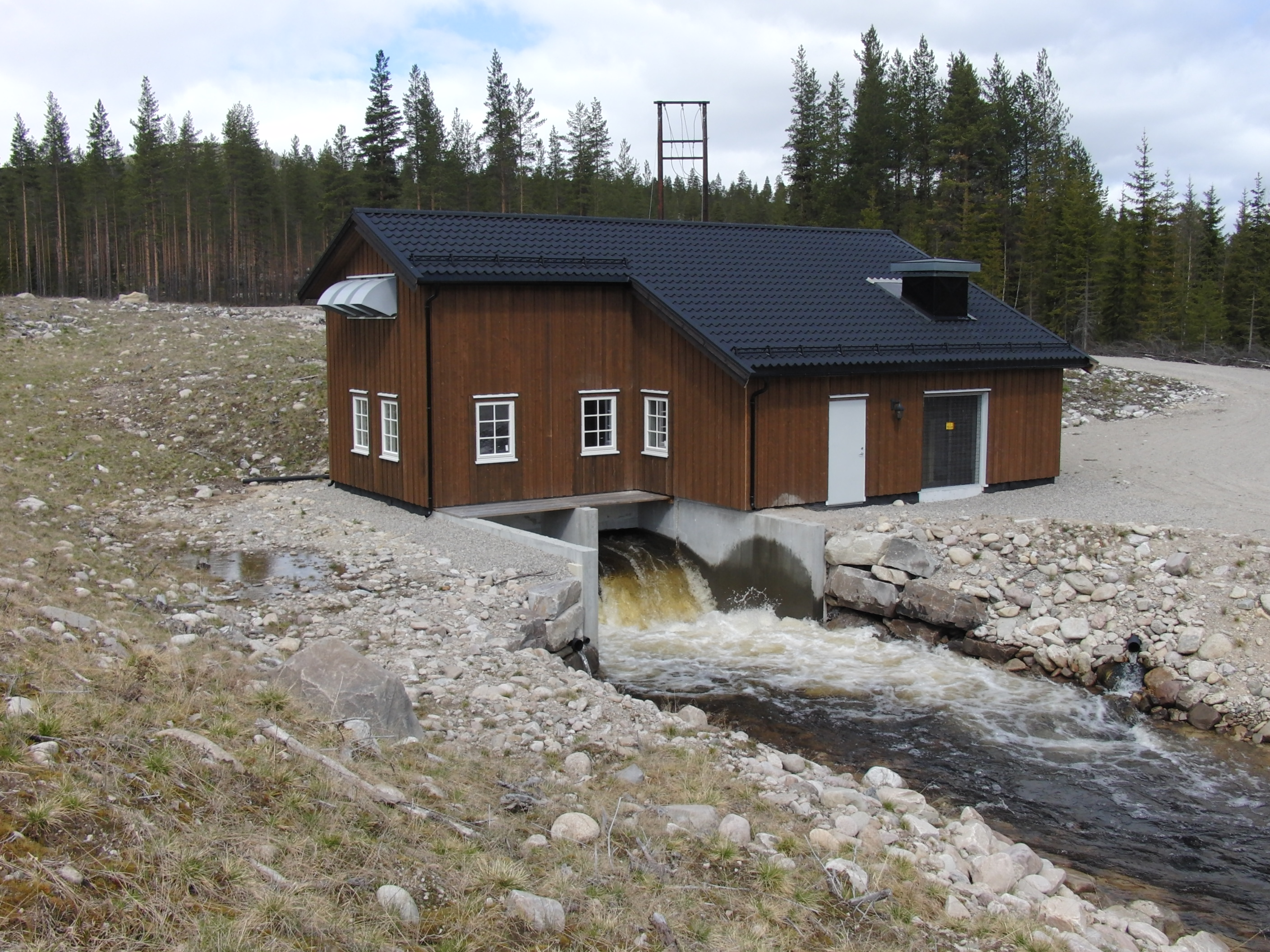
Hanestadnea kraftverk

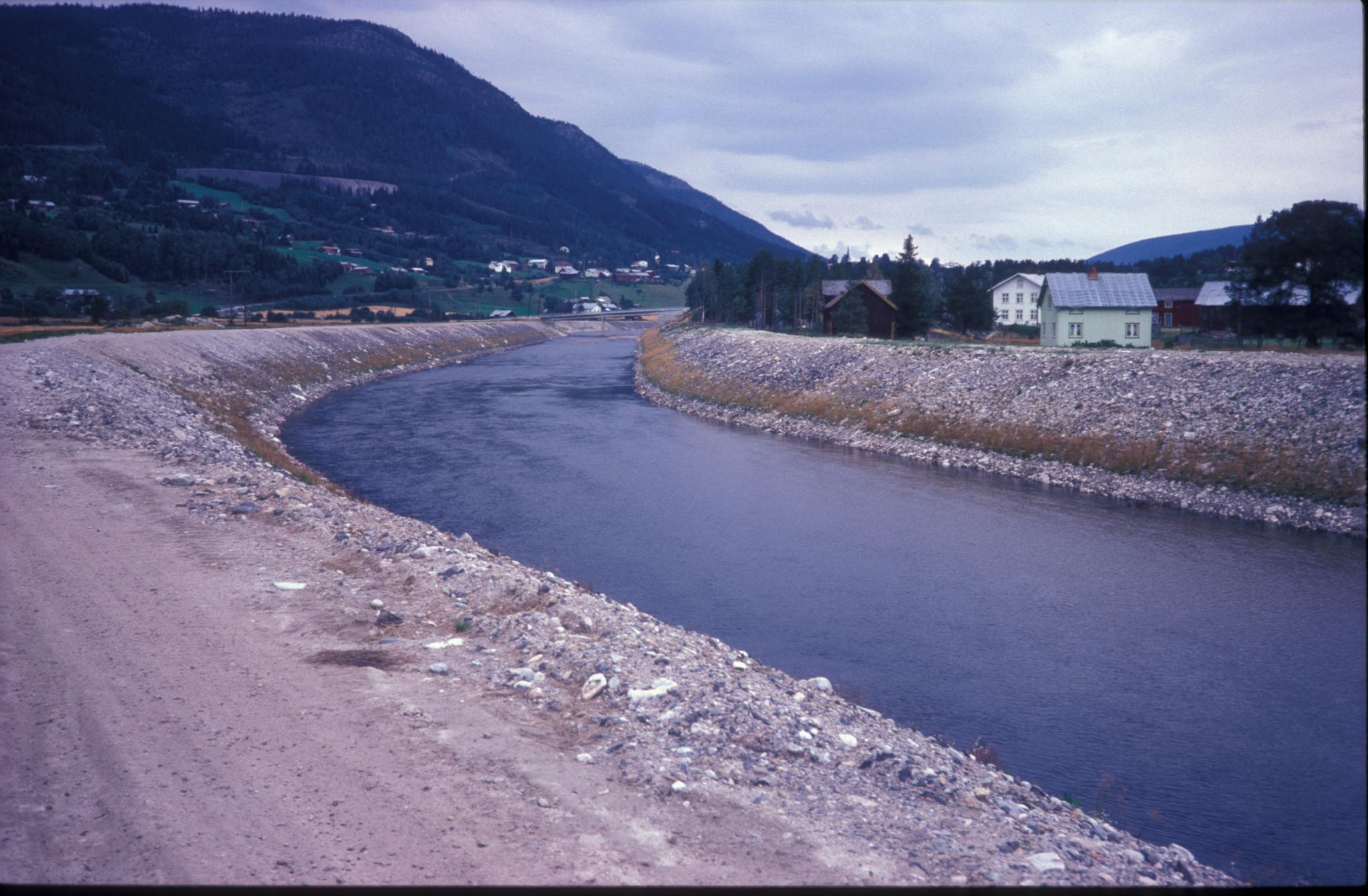
Øvre Rendal

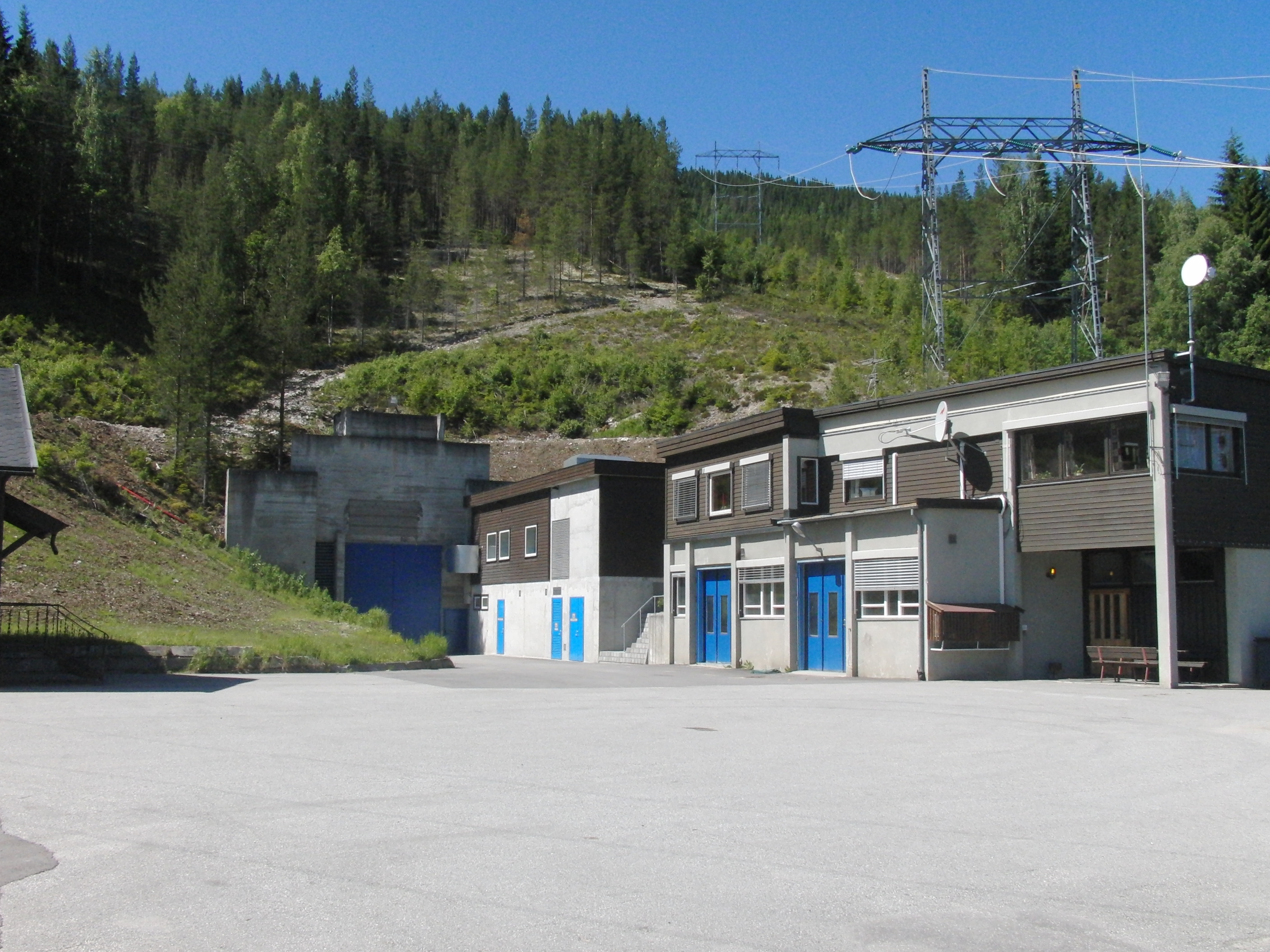
Rendalen kraftverk
