= Åkrestrømmen =

Village in Rendalen Municipality, Norway

Åkrestrømmen Åkersstrømmen (historic)
- Village
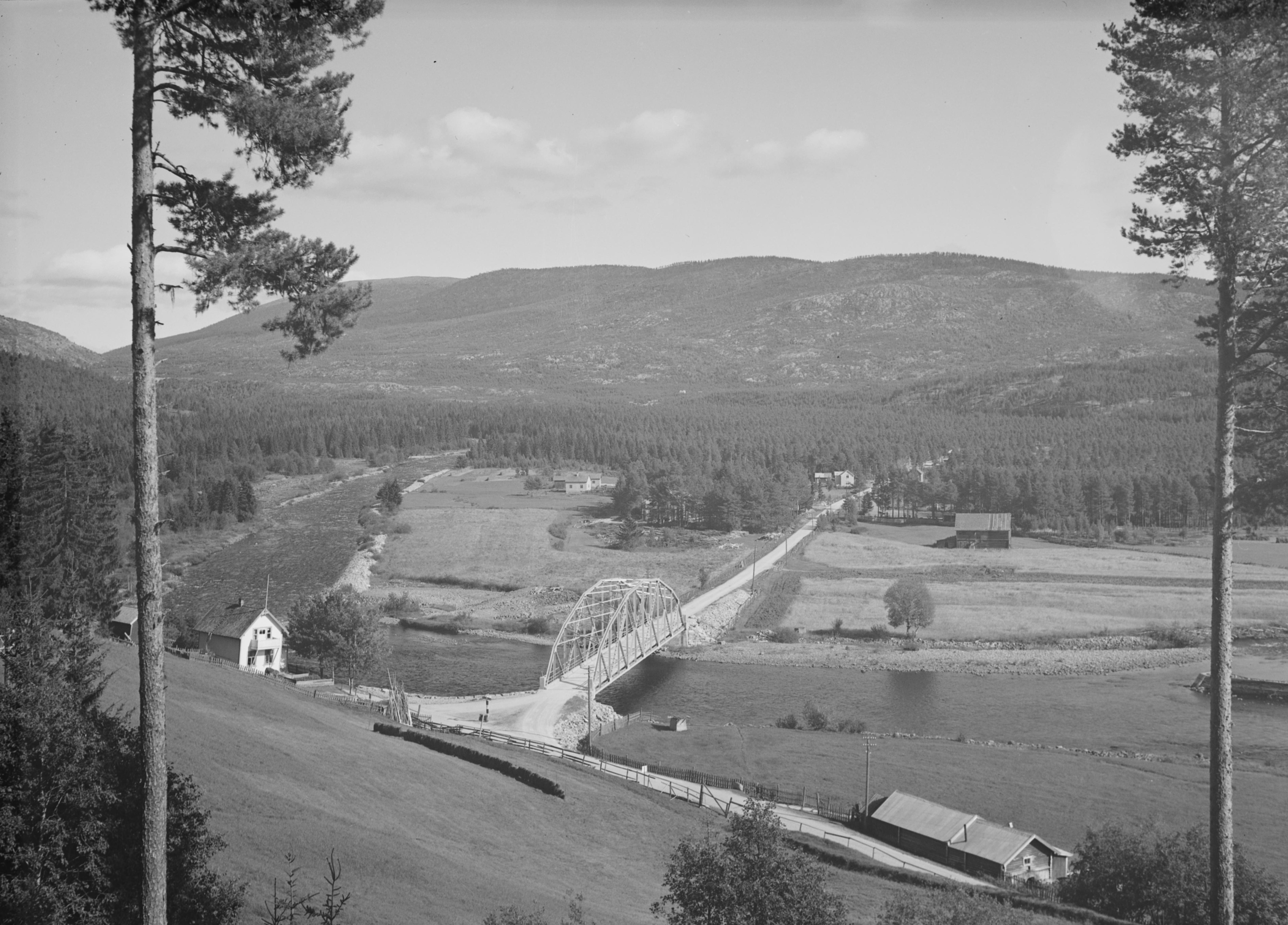
- View of the village
- Interactive map of Åkrestrømmen
- Location within Innlandet Location within Norway
- Coordinates: 61.69559°N 11.20939°E
- Country: Norway
- Region: Eastern Norway
- County: Innlandet
- District: Østerdalen
- Municipality: Rendalen Municipality
- Elevation: 264 m (866 ft)
- Time zone: UTC+01:00 (CET)
  - Summer (DST): UTC+02:00 (CEST)
- Post Code: 2485 Rendalen

Åkrestrømmen is a village in Rendalen Municipality in Innlandet county, Norway. The village is located along the river Renaelva at the northern end of the lake Storsjøen, about 3 kilometres (1.9 mi) south of the village of Åkre. The town of Koppang lies about 20 kilometres (12 mi) to the southwest of Åkrestrømmen.
