= Sjølisand =

Village in Rendalen Municipality, Norway

- Village
- Interactive map of Sjølisand
- Location within Innlandet Location within Norway
- Coordinates: 61.4617°N 11.32737°E
- Country: Norway
- Region: Eastern Norway
- County: Innlandet
- District: Østerdalen
- Municipality: Rendalen Municipality
- Elevation: 359 m (1,178 ft)
- Time zone: UTC+01:00 (CET)
  - Summer (DST): UTC+02:00 (CEST)
- Post Code: 2450 Rena

Sjølisand is a village in Rendalen Municipality in Innlandet county, Norway. The village is located about 30 kilometres (19 mi) south of the village of Åkrestrømmen, near the southern end of the lake Storsjøen.
