= Krogharpe =

Norwegian musical instrument

The krogharpe was a type of harp native to Norway, which featured steel strings and a horizontal soundboard. In the modern era German harpist Nancy Thym has reconstructed and played a krogharpe based on an instrument built in 1776 in Østerdalen.

== Period description ==
A 1916 article in The Musical Times described the instrument:

The Krogharp is an antique and uncouth instrument with metal strings and a horizontal sound-board. It is still in use among the peasantry, and with reason; for it is capable of producing great emotional effects, and is peculiarly fitted to be the interpreter of that weird Norwegian music, through which such a deep strain of melancholy runs.

A 1902 German-language encyclopedia described it as "played until recently."
