= Unset =

Unset may refer to:

== Places ==
- Unset, Norway, a small village in Rendalen municipality in Innlandet county, Norway

== Other ==
- Unset (Unix), a Unix command

== See also ==
- Sigrid Undset (1882–1949), Norwegian novelist who was awarded the Nobel Prize for Literature in 1928.
