= Åkre, Innlandet =

Village in Rendalen Municipality, Norway

Åkre
- Village
- Interactive map of Åkre
- Location within Innlandet Location within Norway
- Coordinates: 61.71881°N 11.1929°E
- Country: Norway
- Region: Eastern Norway
- County: Innlandet
- District: Østerdalen
- Municipality: Rendalen Municipality
- Elevation: 280 m (920 ft)
- Time zone: UTC+01:00 (CET)
  - Summer (DST): UTC+02:00 (CEST)
- Post Code: 2485 Rendalen

Åkre is a village in Rendalen Municipality in Innlandet county, Norway. The village is located just north of Åkrestrømmen, near the southern end of the lake Lomnessjøen. The road leads to the village of Koppang and if you drive the other way it leads to the town of Tynset via the villages of Otnes and Bergset.
