= Peder E. Vorum =

Norwegian politician

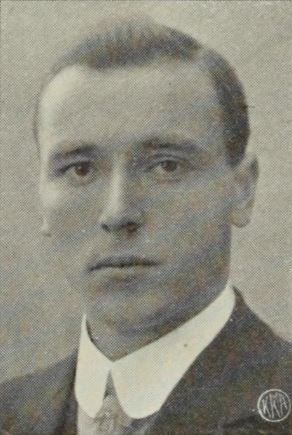
Peder Edvard Vorum (1884–1970)

Peder Edvard Vorum (4 October 1884 – 24 April 1970) was a Norwegian educator and politician for the Labour Democrats, the Labour Party and Nasjonal Samling.

He was born at Steinnes in Sparbu as a son of farmers Christoffer Olsen Vorum (1843–1915) and Karoline Elvine Ertsaas (1855–1890). He attended Ogndal Folk High School from 1901 to 1902, and graduated from Levanger Teachers' College in 1905. He was hired as a school teacher at Falstad in 1905, then in Egge Municipality later in 1905, then in Andenes Municipality from 1906 to 1909. In 1910 he was hired as a teacher in Ytre Rendal Municipality. He was hired as county auditor in 1929, and chief administrative officer in Åmot Municipality in 1941. In 1944 he became school director.

He served as mayor of Ytre Rendal Municipality from 1913 to 1934. From 1931 to 1933 he chaired Hedmark county council. He stood for parliamentary election in 1918, representing the Labour Democrats, but finished a distant fourth among the four candidates. In 1921 he was a minor ballot candidat for the same party, now named the Radical People's Party. In 1927 and 1930 he had changed allegiance and was now a minor ballot candidat for the Labour Party.

He was elected to the Parliament of Norway in 1933, representing the constituency of Hedmark, and was re-elected in 1936. This was a representative for the Labour Party. He had formerly stood on the ballot for the Radical People's Party in the 1921 general election, and been eighth and tenth ballot candidate (and thus not elected) for Labour in the 1927 and 1930 elections, respectively.

During the German occupation of Norway he joined the Fascist party Nasjonal Samling in the autumn of 1940. He was installed as chief administrative officer in Åmot, and also served as mayor. He was the only person in the Labour Party's parliamentary group from 1936 to join Nasjonal Samling.

On 24 September 1948, during the legal purge in Norway after World War II he was convicted of treason and sentenced to five years of forced labour and loss of his job. He was one of fifteen former Labour Party mayors to be convicted of treason. He died in April 1970 and was buried in Ytre Rendal.
