= Unset, Norway =

Village in Rendalen Municipality, Norway

Unset
- Village
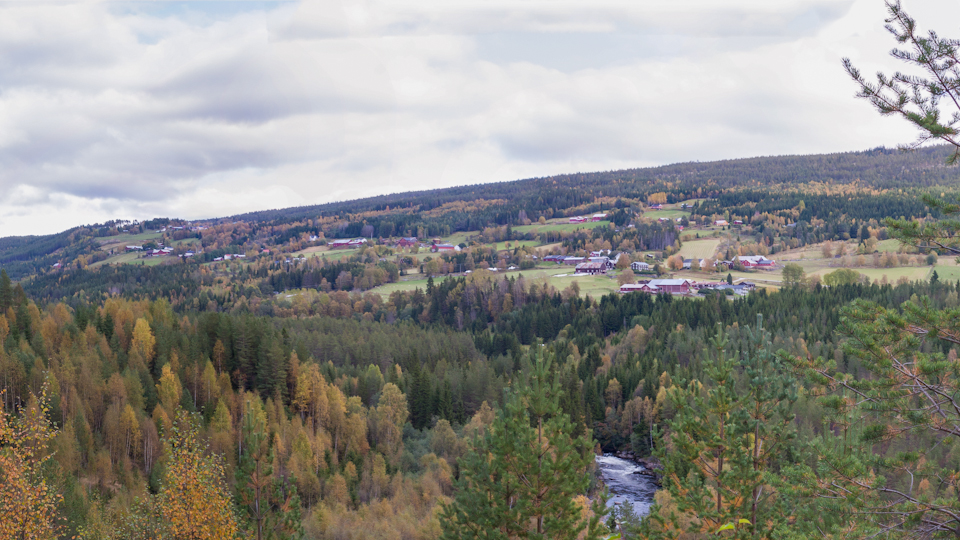
- View of the village area
- Interactive map of Unset
- Location within Innlandet Location within Norway
- Coordinates: 61.96697°N 11.10307°E
- Country: Norway
- Region: Eastern Norway
- County: Innlandet
- District: Østerdalen
- Municipality: Rendalen Municipality
- Elevation: 429 m (1,407 ft)
- Time zone: UTC+01:00 (CET)
  - Summer (DST): UTC+02:00 (CEST)
- Post Code: 2485 Rendalen

Unset is a village in Rendalen Municipality in Innlandet county, Norway. The village is located along the river Unsetåa, about 10 kilometres (6.2 mi) northeast of the village of Bergset.
