= Kjøllsæter Bridge =

Kjøllsæter Bridge Kjøllsæterbrua
- Coordinates: 61.2217°N 11.4943°E
- Crosses: Renaelva
- Locale: Rena, Åmot

Characteristics
- Design: Deck truss bridge
- Material: Wood
- Total length: 158 metres (518 ft)
- Width: 6 metres (20 ft)
- Longest span: 45 metres (148 ft)
- No. of spans: 6
- Load limit: 7.5 tonnes (7.4 long tons; 8.3 short tons)
- Clearance below: 5.5 metres (18 ft)

History
- Opened: 17 August 2006

Location
- Interactive map of Kjøllsæter Bridge

The Kjøllsæter Bridge (Norwegian: Kjøllsæterbrua) is a 158-metre (518 ft) long wooden deck truss bridge that crosses the river Renaelva in Åmot Municipality in Innlandet county, Norway. The bridge lies just northeast of the village of Rena and it connects two large military training areas that are part of the Rena Camp military base. It also gives the people living in Rød area a better road connection across the river. The clearance to the water is 5.5 metres (18 ft).

The bridge was built to carry military vehicles and equipment such as tank guns and other heavy machines. The bridge was built to meet the NATO standards and carry up to 109 tonnes (107 long tons; 120 short tons) on a span of 30 metres (98 ft). However due to the collaps of Tretten bridge it has been down classified to 7.5 tonnes.

The Kjøllsæter bridge was opened 17 August 2006. Its total cost reached 32 million kr equivalent at the time to about US$6 million.
