= Malfred Bergseth =

Norwegian trade unionist

Malfred Kasper Bergseth (19 June 1895 – 24 August 1966) was a Norwegian trade unionist.

He was born in Øvre Rendal Municipality. He was a manual laborer from a young age, mostly in construction. He organized both politically and trade-wise in 1912, joining the Norwegian Union of General Workers and Norges Socialdemokratiske Ungdomsforbund. In 1917 however he left social democracy to become a syndicalist, in Norsk Syndikalistisk Forbund. He became known as manager of Oslo sten, jord og cementarbeiderforening in 1927, a union he had joined in 1923. In 1930 he became deputy chairman of the Norwegian Union of Building Industry Workers. He later chaired the union.

Bergseth served 24 days in prison for supporting the Left Communist Youth League's military strike action of 1924, and 30 days in prison in 1930 for violating § 222 of the Penal Law. This paragraph had been amended in 1927 to include harassment of strikebreakers as a punishable offense. It was strongly disregarded by the labour movement, who dubbed it the "Zuchthaus Act" (Norwegian: tukthusloven). He died in August 1966 and was buried at Østre gravlund.
