= Lomnessjøen =

Lake in Rendalen, Norway

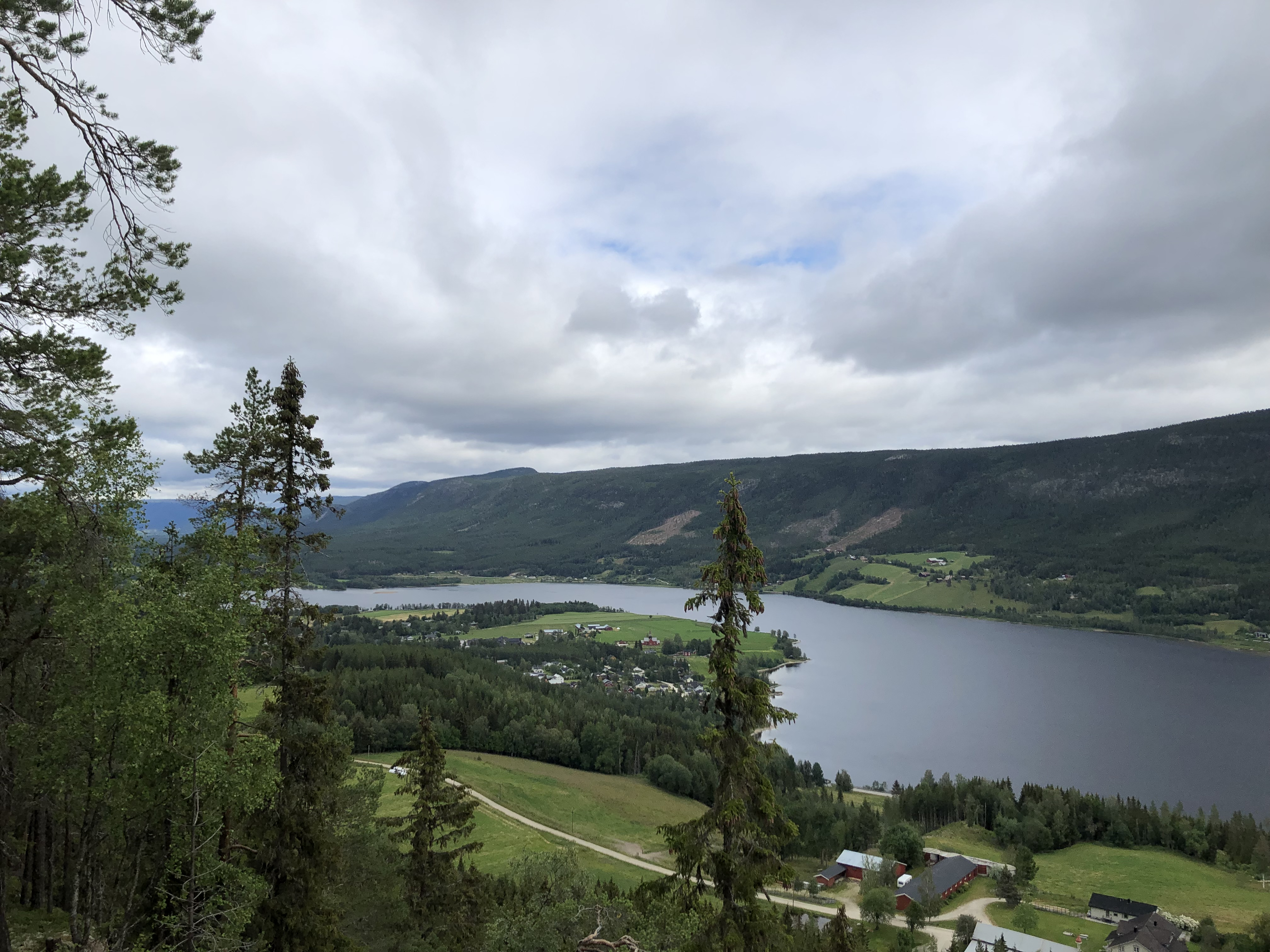
- Interactive map of the lake
- Location: Rendalen Municipality, Innlandet
- Coordinates: 61°46′10″N 11°10′33″E
- Primary inflows: Renaelva
- Primary outflows: Storsjøen, Renaelva
- Basin countries: Norway
- Max. length: 5 kilometres (3.1 mi)
- Max. width: 1 kilometre (0.62 mi)
- Surface area: 3.68 km^{2} (1.42 sq mi)
- Shore length^{1}: 13.93 kilometres (8.66 mi)
- Surface elevation: 256 metres (840 ft)
- References: NVE
- ^{1} Shore length is not a well-defined measure.

Lomnessjøen is a lake in Rendalen Municipality in Innlandet county, Norway. The villages Åkre and Otnes are located on the shores of the lake. The lake is part of the Renaelva river system. The Renaelva river flows into the lake from the north. The south end of the river drains into the larger lake Storsjøen which is about 3 kilometres (1.9 mi) to the south of this lake.

== History ==
From 1946-1953, the southern outlet of the lake was modified to lower the water level of the lake by about 2 feet (0.61 m) with the purpose of increasing the amount of arable land surrounding the lake and river upstream.

== See also ==
- List of lakes in Norway
