= Hanestad Church =

Church in Innlandet, Norway

- Hanestad kirke
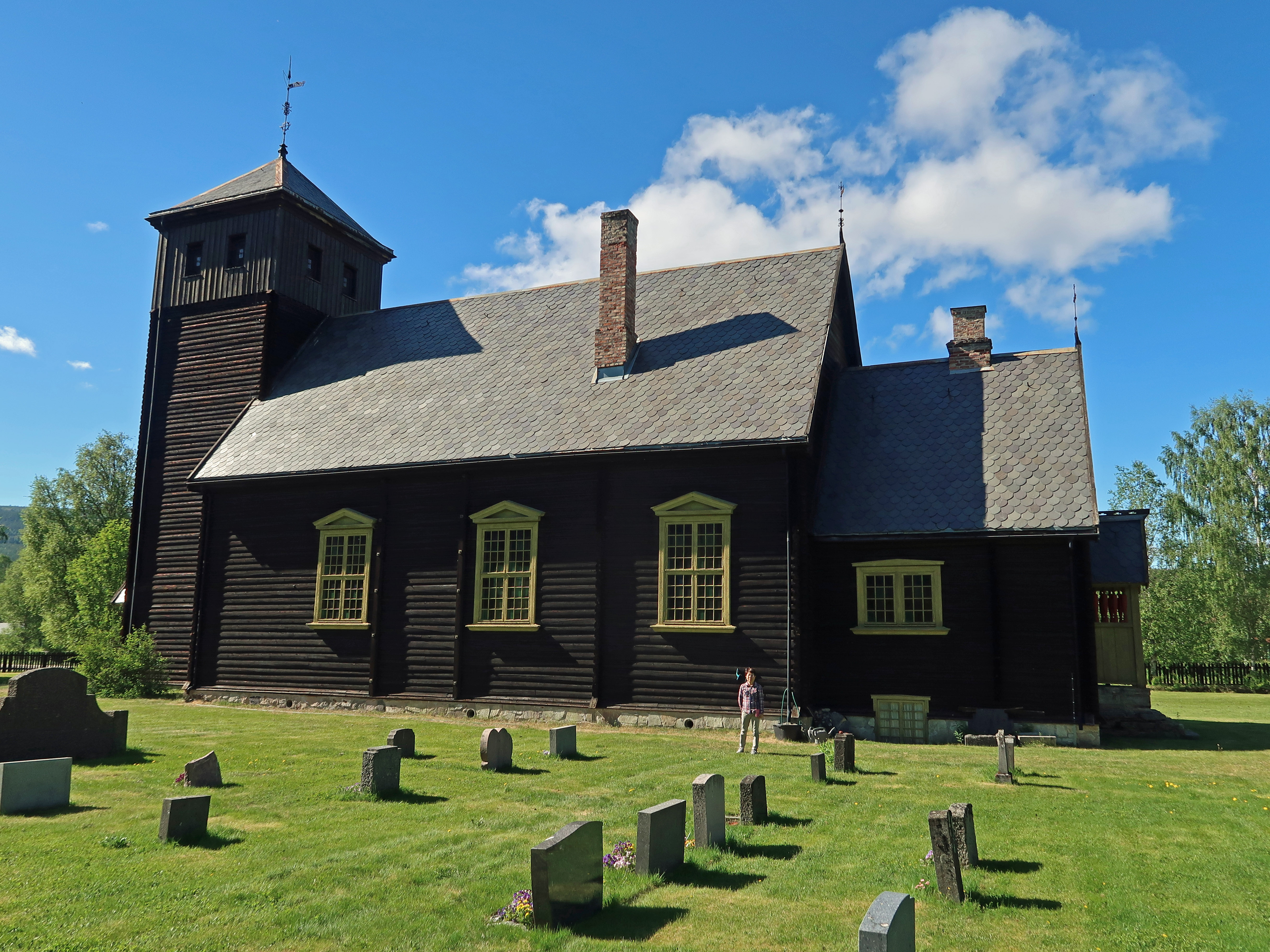
- View of the church
- Hanestad Church
- 61°50′22″N 10°53′21″E
- Location: Rendalen Municipality, Innlandet
- Country: Norway
- Denomination: Church of Norway
- Churchmanship: Evangelical Lutheran

History
- Status: Parish church
- Founded: 1926
- Consecrated: 19 December 1926

Architecture
- Functional status: Active
- Architect: Carl Berner
- Architectural type: Long church
- Completed: 1926 (100 years ago)

Specifications
- Capacity: 170
- Materials: Wood

Administration
- Diocese: Hamar bispedømme
- Deanery: Nord-Østerdal prosti
- Parish: Hanestad
- Norwegian Cultural Heritage Site
- Type: Church
- Status: Protected
- ID: 84480

Hanestad Church (Norwegian: Hanestad kirke) is a parish church of the Church of Norway in Rendalen Municipality in Innlandet county, Norway. It is located in the village of Hanestad. It is the church for the Hanestad parish which is part of the Nord-Østerdal prosti (deanery) in the Diocese of Hamar. The brown, wooden church was built in a long church design in 1926 using plans drawn up by the architect Carl Berner. The church seats about 170 people.

== History ==
In the late 1910s, the parish received permission to build an annex chapel in Hanestad. The chapel was designed by Carl Berner around 1919–20. The builder was Kristoffer Brændhagen from Romedal, and the spire and gutters were made by the blacksmith J.H. Hansen. Construction of the new chapel began in 1920, but along the way, the parish ran out of money, so more money had to be raised. The chapel wasn't finished until 1926. The chapel was consecrated on 19 December 1926. In 1997, the chapel was upgraded in status to a parish church.

== Media gallery ==
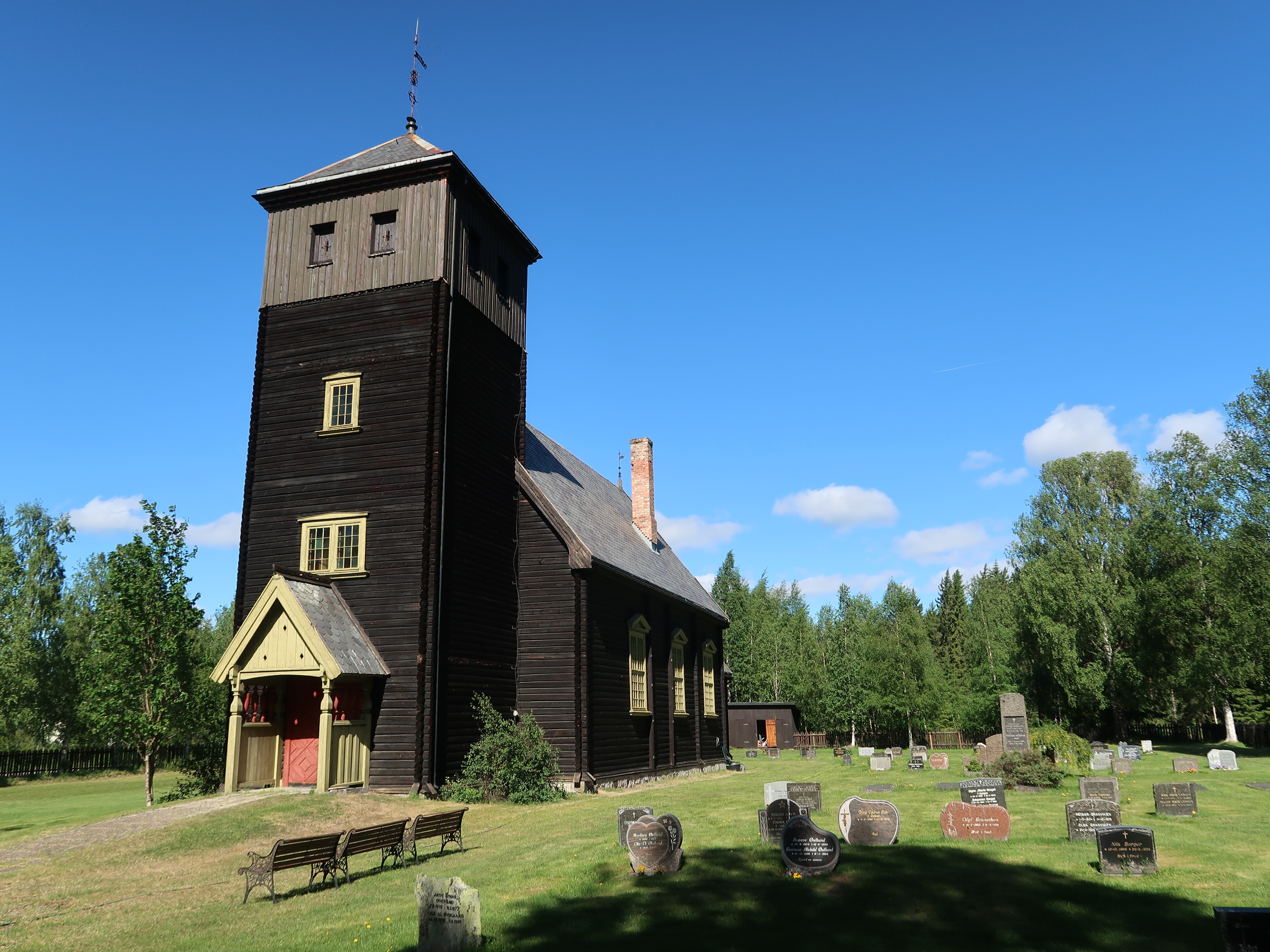

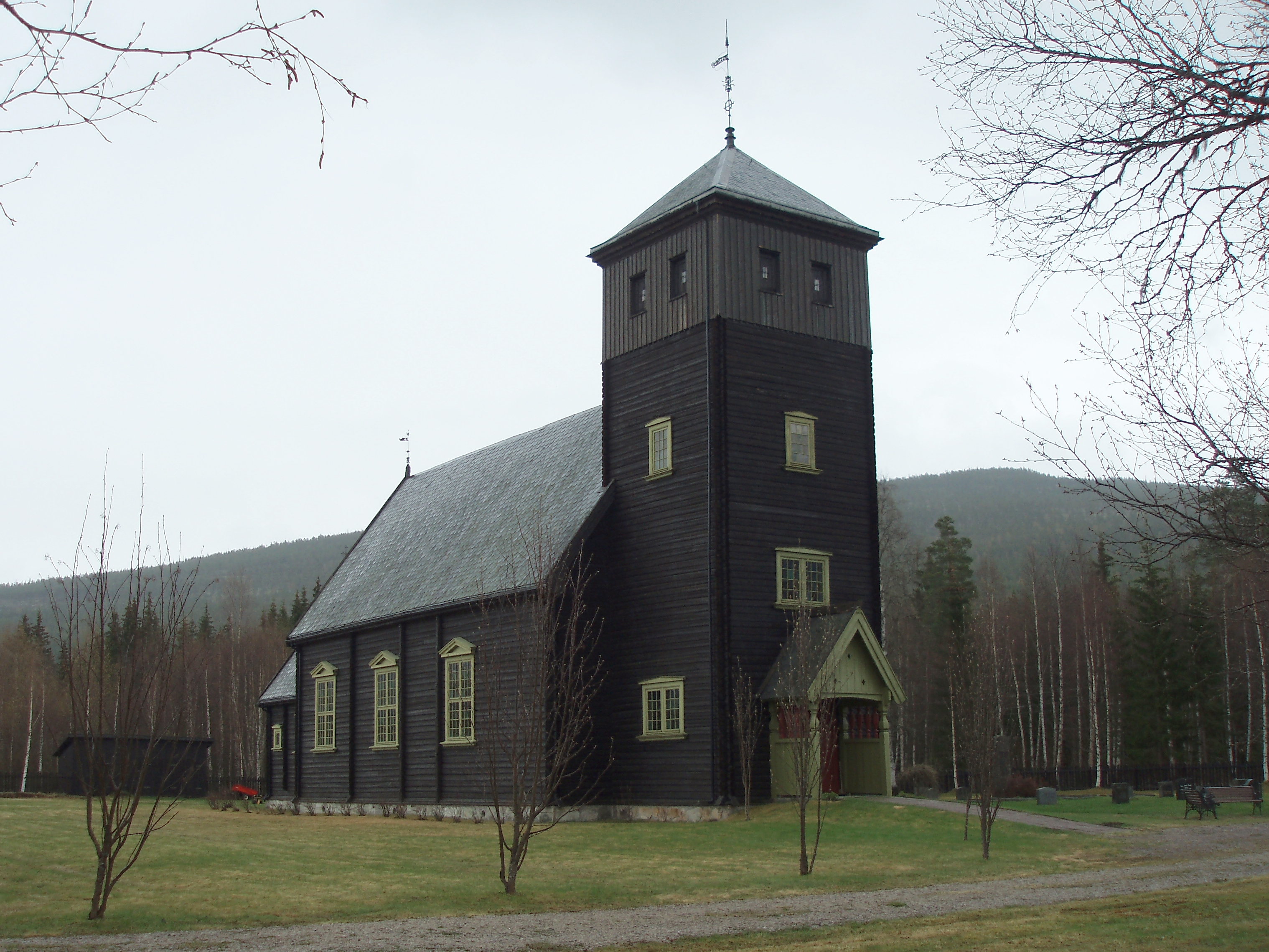

== See also ==
- List of churches in Hamar
