= Otnes =

Village in Rendalen Municipality, Norway

Otnes Ottnes
- Village
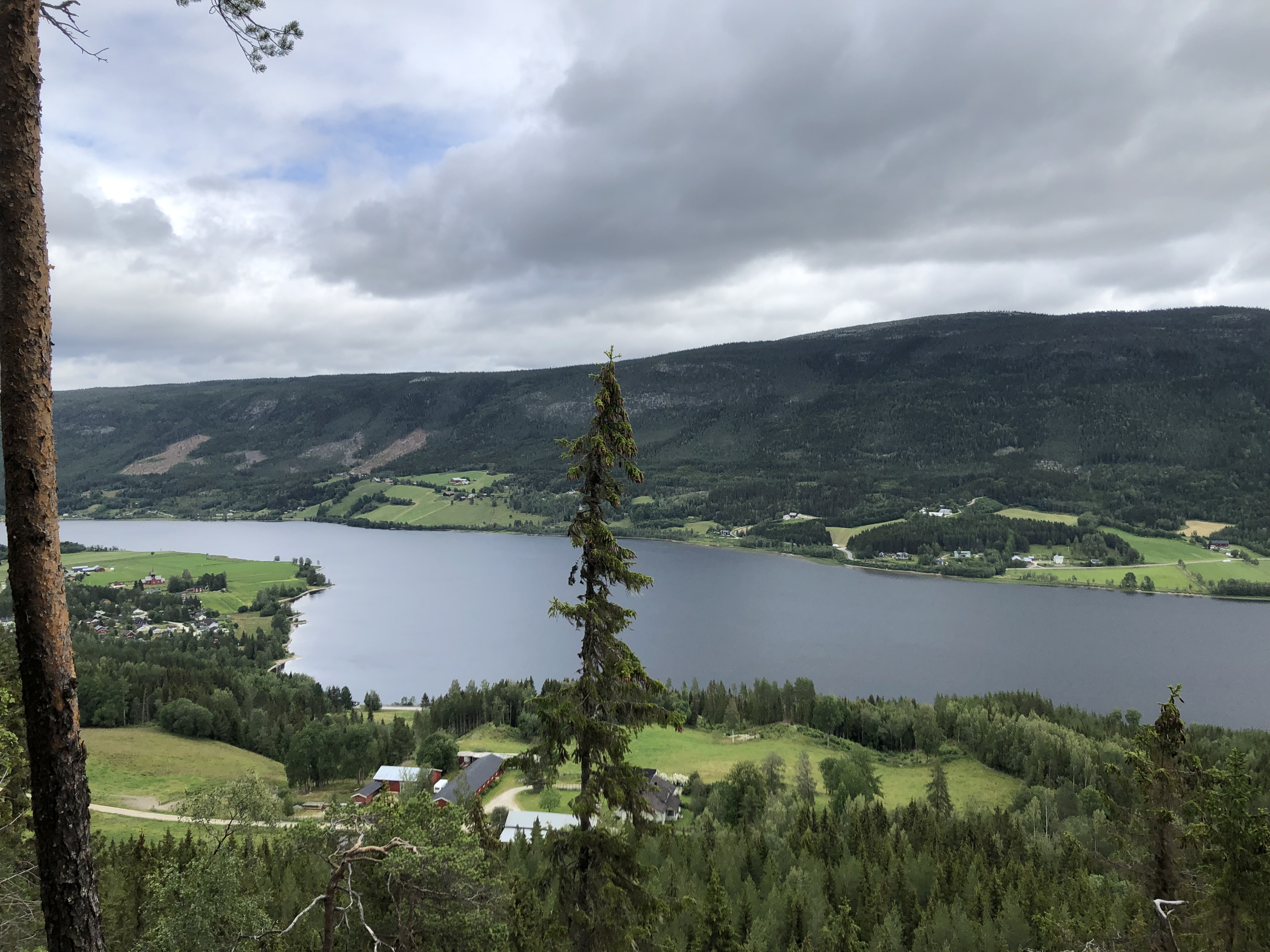
- View of the village
- Interactive map of Otnes
- Location within Innlandet Location within Norway
- Coordinates: 61.75968°N 11.1719°E
- Country: Norway
- Region: Eastern Norway
- County: Innlandet
- District: Østerdalen
- Municipality: Rendalen Municipality

Area
  - Total: 0.49 km^{2} (0.19 sq mi)
- Elevation: 277 m (909 ft)

Population (2024)
  - Total: 270
  - Density: 551/km^{2} (1,430/sq mi)
- Time zone: UTC+01:00 (CET)
  - Summer (DST): UTC+02:00 (CEST)
- Post Code: 2485 Rendalen

Otnes is a village in Rendalen Municipality in Innlandet county, Norway. The village is located along the lake Lomnessjøen, about 4.5 kilometres (2.8 mi) north of the village of Åkre. The village of Bergset (the municipal centre) lies about 15 kilometres (9.3 mi) to the north of Otnes.

The 0.49-square-kilometre (120-acre) village has a population (2024) of 270 and a population density of 551 inhabitants per square kilometre (1,430/sq mi).

Otnes has one church in the village, Ytre Rendal Church. The tiny village contains a Gas station, Grocery store, small Bank inside the grocery store, library, and a Doctor's office.

== History ==
Otnes was the administrative centre of the old Ytre Rendal Municipality which existed from 1880 until 1965 when it became part of Rendalen Municipality.
