= Kvål, Innlandet =

Village in Ringsaker Municipality, Norway

Kvalfeltet Kvål
- Village
- Interactive map of Kvalfeltet
- Location within Innlandet Location within Norway
- Coordinates: 60.85744°N 11.01887°E
- Country: Norway
- Region: Eastern Norway
- County: Innlandet
- District: Hedmarken
- Municipality: Ringsaker Municipality

Area
  - Total: 0.15 km^{2} (0.058 sq mi)
- Elevation: 274 m (899 ft)

Population (2024)
  - Total: 294
  - Density: 1,960/km^{2} (5,100/sq mi)
- Time zone: UTC+01:00 (CET)
  - Summer (DST): UTC+02:00 (CEST)
- Post Code: 2320 Furnes

Kvål or Kvalfeltet is a village in Ringsaker Municipality in Innlandet county, Norway. The village is located about 2 kilometres (1.2 mi) northwest of the village of Nydal and about the same distance north of the village of Furnes. The village lies just north of the European route E6 highway.

The 0.15-square-kilometre (37-acre) town has a population (2024) of 294 and a population density of 1,960 inhabitants per square kilometre (5,100/sq mi).
