= David P. Kvile =

Norwegian politician

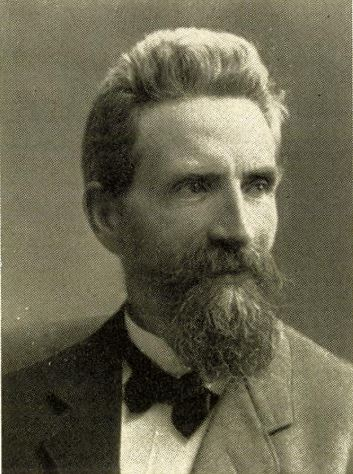
Photographic portrait of a mayor of Rendalen, Norway

David Pedersen Kvile (21 September 1861 – 24 June 1918) was a Norwegian teacher, farmer, and politician for the Liberal Party.

He was born at Kvile in Breim Municipality as a son of farmers Peder A. Kvile and Kirsti J. Kaudal. He graduated from Stord Teachers' College in 1882, and worked briefly in Gransherred Municipality from 1883 before settling as a teacher in Øvre Rendal Municipality in 1885. From 1890 he also ran the farm Berger. He married a farmer's daughter from Gransherred Municipality.

He was a member of the municipal council of Øvre Rendal Municipality from 1893 to 1904, serving as mayor since 1897. In 1911 he again became mayor after a hiatus. He was elected as a deputy representative to the Parliament of Norway in 1909, 1912 and 1915. He died in June 1918 and was buried at Øvre Rendal Church.
