= Hanestad =

Village in Rendalen Municipality, Norway

- Village
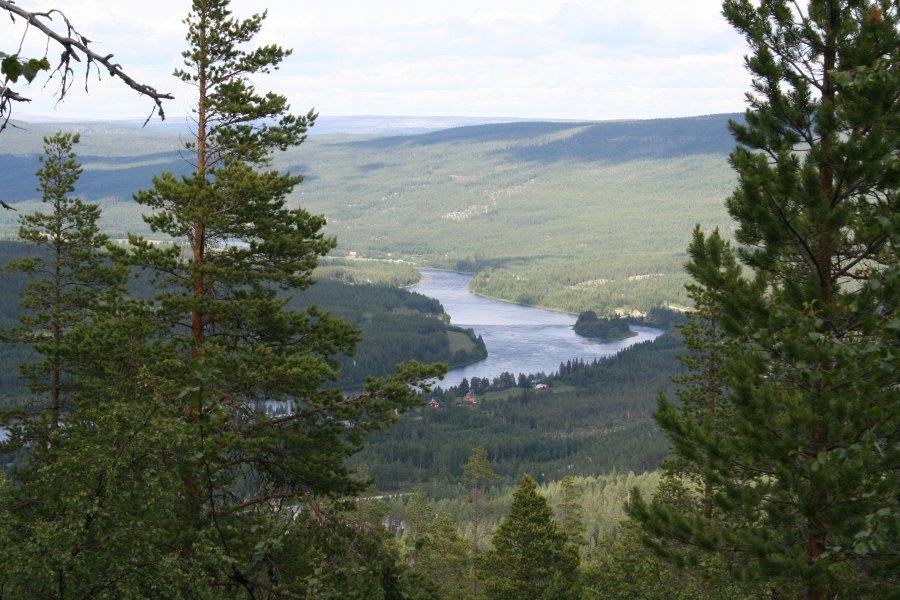
- View of the village
- Interactive map of Hanestad
- Location within Innlandet Location within Norway
- Coordinates: 61.83323°N 10.86824°E
- Country: Norway
- Region: Eastern Norway
- County: Innlandet
- District: Østerdalen
- Municipality: Rendalen Municipality
- Elevation: 381 m (1,250 ft)
- Time zone: UTC+01:00 (CET)
  - Summer (DST): UTC+02:00 (CEST)
- Post Code: 2478 Hanestad

Hanestad is a village in Rendalen Municipality in Innlandet county, Norway. The village is located along the river Glomma, about 15 kilometres (9.3 mi) southwest of the village of Bergset. The Norwegian National Road 3 runs through the village. The Rørosbanen railway line also runs through the village, stopping at Hanestad Station, the only railroad station in Rendalen Municipality. In 2021, the village had 40 residents.
