= Storsjøen (Rendalen) =

Lake in Rendalen and Åmot, Hedmark, Norway

Storsjø
- Storsjø (unofficial)
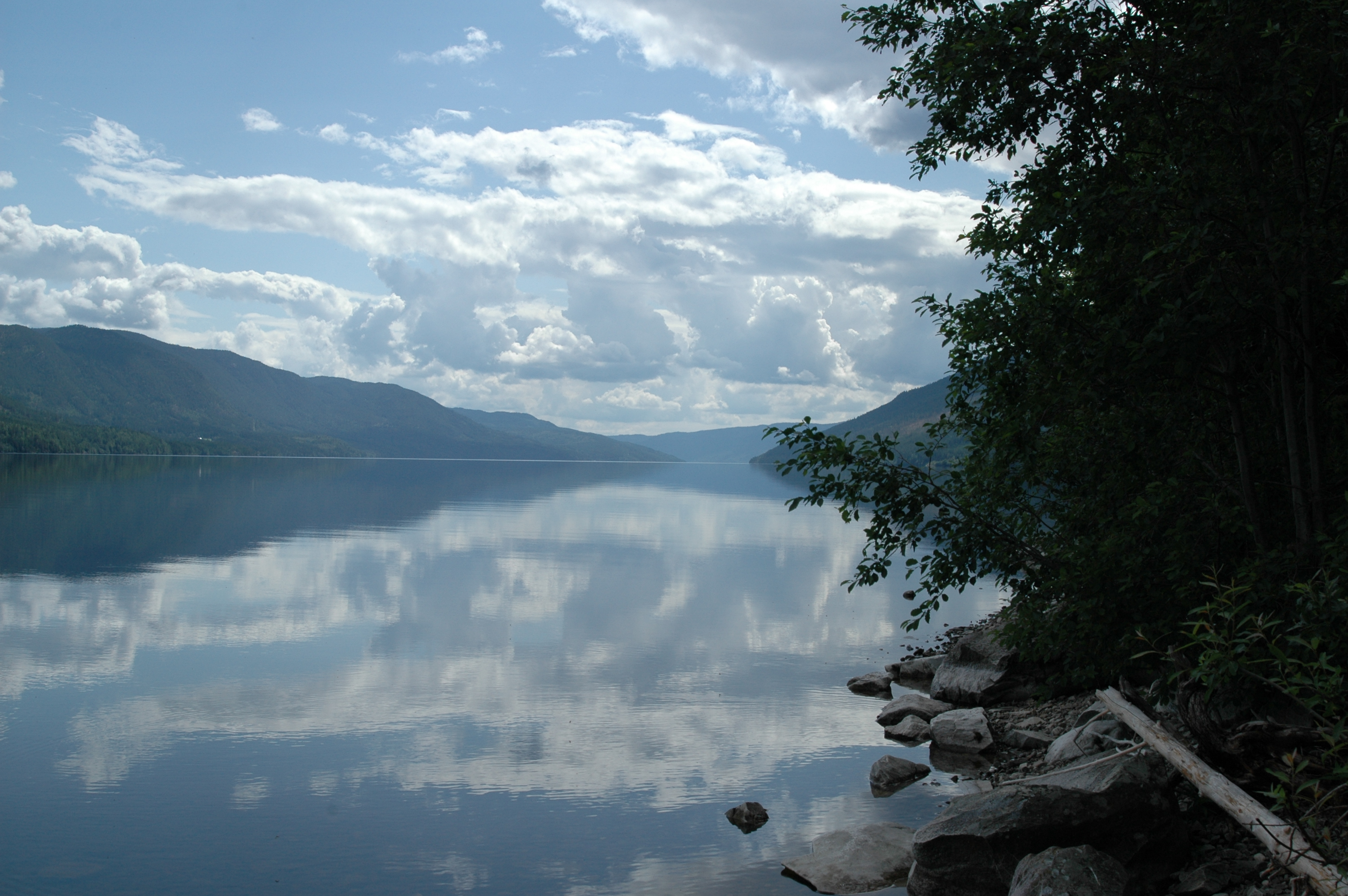
- View of the south side of the lake
- Interactive map of the lake
- Location: Åmot and Rendalen, Innlandet
- Coordinates: 61°27′08″N 11°18′35″E
- Type: fault lake
- Primary inflows: Flena, Glesåa, Mistra from Lomnessjøen, Møra and Renaelva
- Primary outflows: Renaelva
- Catchment area: 2,293.18 km^{2} (885.40 sq mi)
- Basin countries: Norway
- Max. length: 35 km (22 mi)
- Max. width: 1.7 km (1.1 mi)
- Surface area: 48.09 km^{2} (18.57 sq mi)
- Average depth: 139 m (456 ft)
- Max. depth: 309 m (1,014 ft)
- Water volume: 6.684 km^{3} (1.604 cu mi)
- Shore length^{1}: 75.11 km (46.67 mi)
- Surface elevation: 248–252 m (814–827 ft)
- References: NVE and The Physical Geography of Fennoscandia
- ^{1} Shore length is not a well-defined measure.

Storsjøen is the ninth-deepest lake in Norway at 309 metres (1,014 ft) in depth. The 48.09-square-kilometre (18.57 sq mi) lake lies in Rendalen Municipality and Åmot Municipality which are in Innlandet county, Norway. The lake is 35 kilometres (22 mi) long, but only 1.7 kilometres (1.1 mi) wide at its broadest point. The lake lies 252 metres (827 ft) above sea level, has an area of 48.09 square kilometres (18.57 sq mi), and a volume of 6.69 km^{3} (1.61 cu mi).

Historically, the lake was used for floating timber downstream from the forests where it was cut to the downstream mills where it would be cut and sold.

== See also ==
- List of lakes in Norway
