= Bergset =

Village in Rendalen Municipality, Norway

Bergset Berset (historic)
- Village
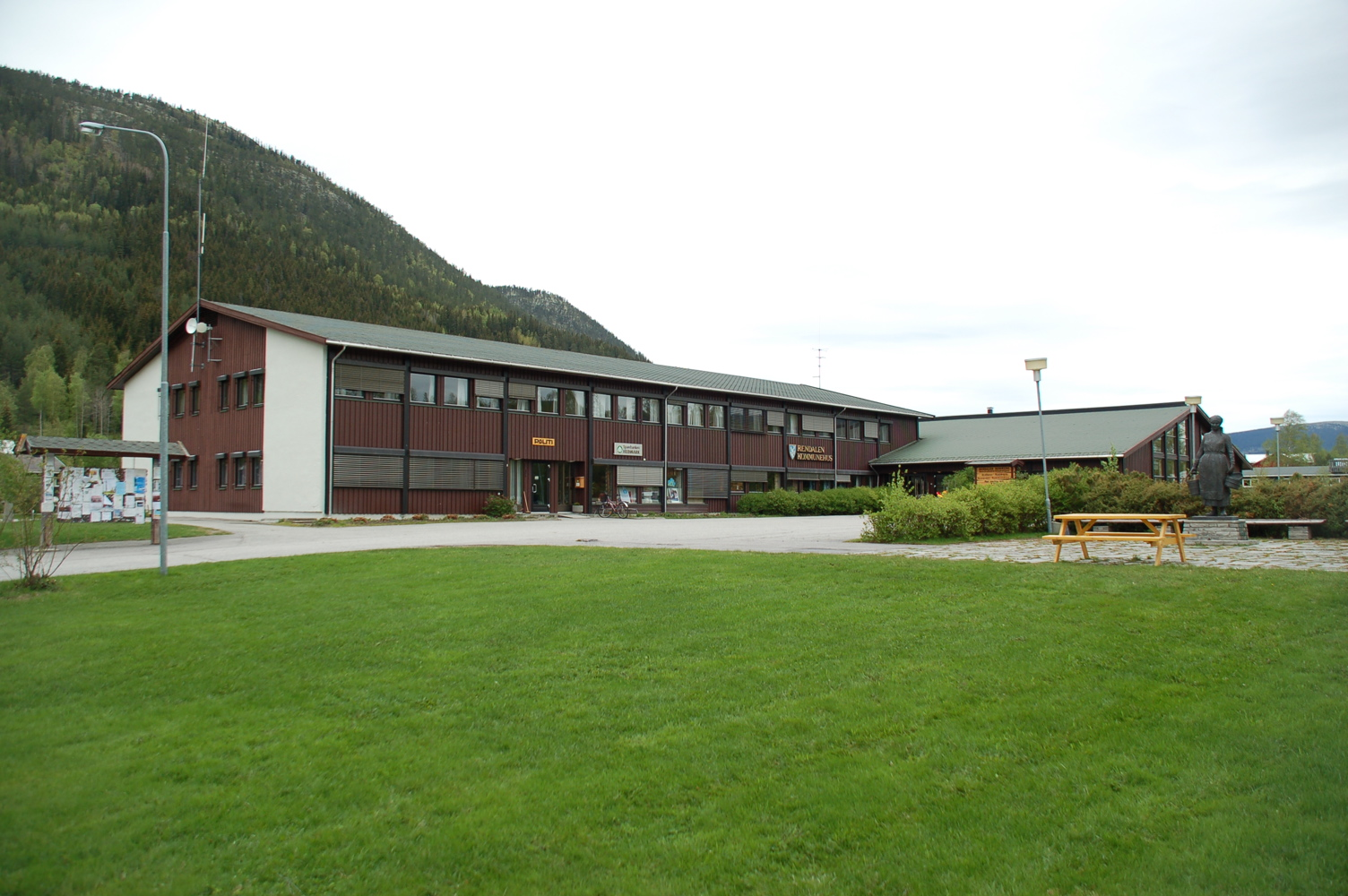
- View of the village community centre
- Interactive map of Bergset
- Location within Innlandet Location within Norway
- Coordinates: 61.89126°N 11.07769°E
- Country: Norway
- Region: Eastern Norway
- County: Innlandet
- District: Østerdalen
- Municipality: Rendalen Municipality

Area
  - Total: 0.99 km^{2} (0.38 sq mi)
- Elevation: 321 m (1,053 ft)

Population (2012)
  - Total: 243
  - Density: 245/km^{2} (630/sq mi)
- Time zone: UTC+01:00 (CET)
  - Summer (DST): UTC+02:0 (CEST)
- Post Code: 2484 Rendalen

Bergset is the administrative centre of Rendalen Municipality in Innlandet county, Norway. The village is located on the western shore of the river Renaelva, about 15 kilometres (9.3 mi) north of the village of Otnes in the largely rural Østerdalen valley.

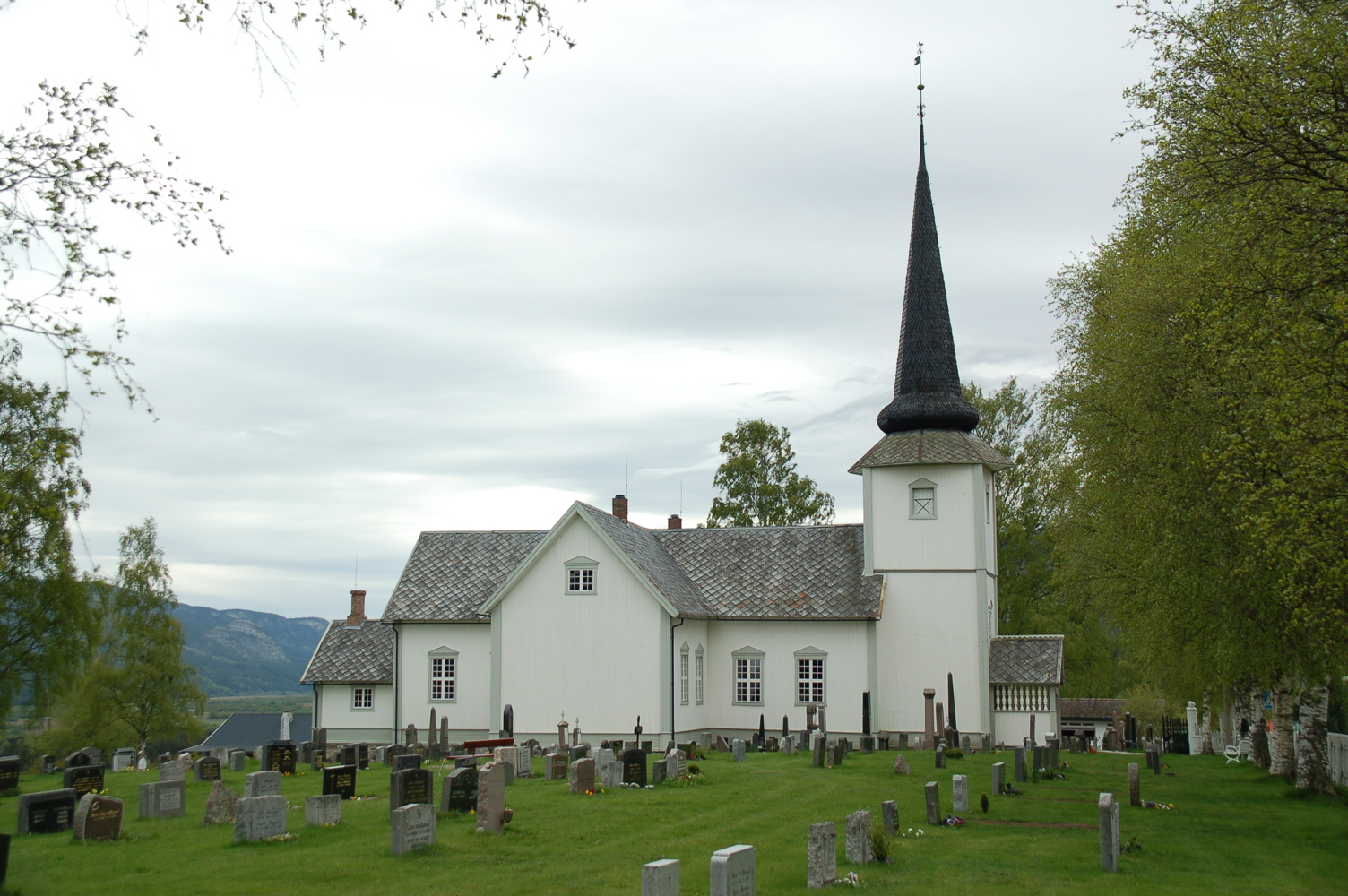
Øvre Rendal Church

The 0.99-square-kilometre (240-acre) village had a population (2012) of 243 and a population density of 245 inhabitants per square kilometre (630/sq mi). Since 2012, the population and area data for this village area has not been separately tracked by Statistics Norway.

== History ==
Bergset was also the administrative centre of the former Øvre Rendal Municipality which is now a part of Rendalen Municipality. Øvre Rendal Church, built in 1761, is located in Bergset. The Rendalen Village Museum in Bergset contains a collection relating to the author Jacob Breda Bull (1853–1930), who was a resident of Rendalen. Bull was buried in the nearby Ytre Rendal Church.
