= Renaelva =

River in Innlandet, Norway

Renaelva / Rena
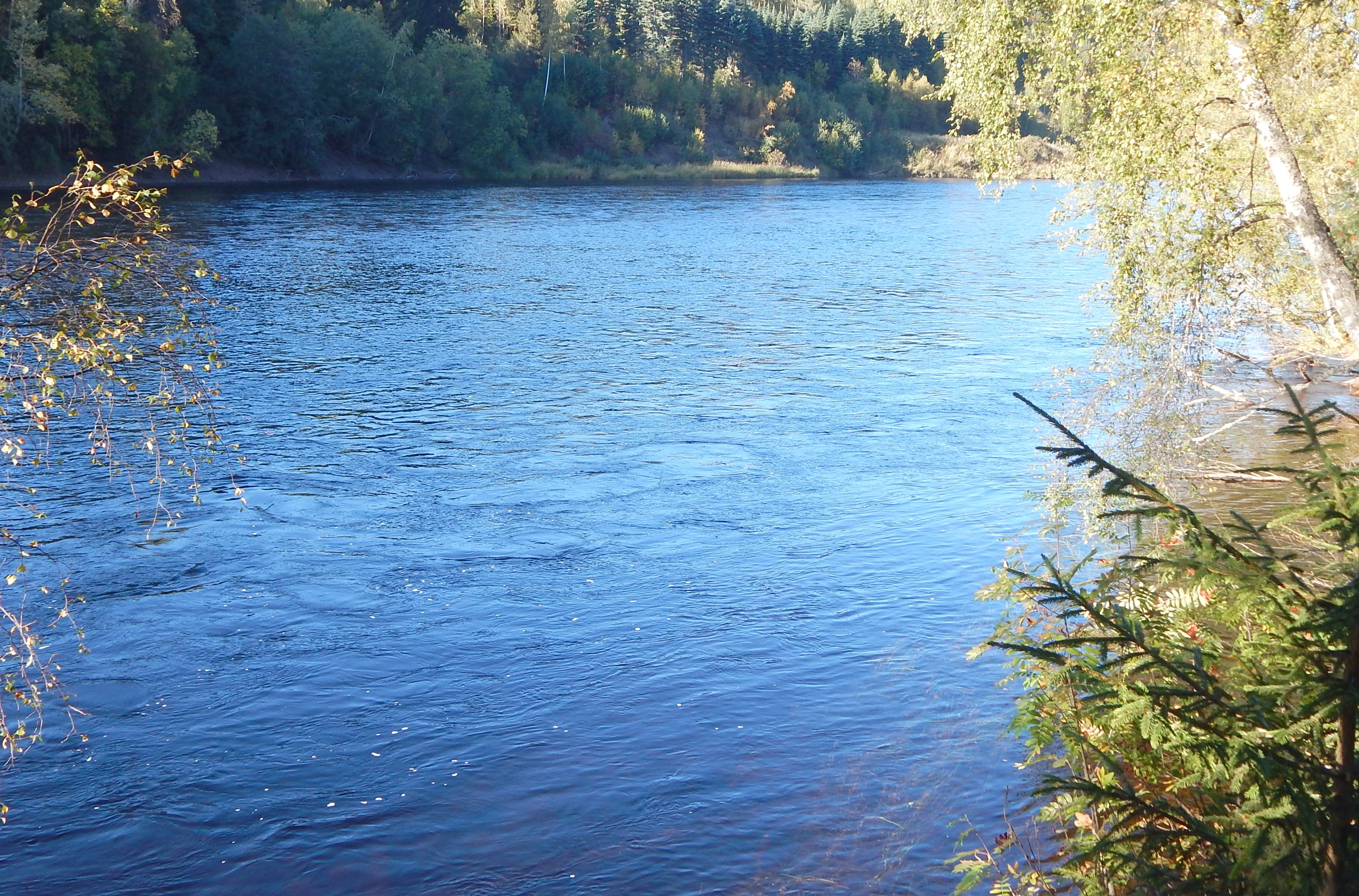

Location
- Country: Norway
- County: Innlandet
- Municipalities: Rendalen Municipality and Åmot Municipality

Physical characteristics
- Source: Confluence of the rivers Tysla and Unsetåa
  - location: Rendalen Municipality, Innlandet
  - coordinates: 61°55′01″N 11°04′07″E
  - elevation: 265 metres (869 ft)
- Mouth: Confluence with Glomma river
  - location: Åmot Municipality, Innlandet
  - coordinates: 61°08′09″N 11°23′06″E
  - elevation: 185 metres (607 ft)
- Length: 165 km (103 mi)
- Basin size: 3,967 km^{2} (1,532 sq mi)

The Rena or Renaelva is a river in Innlandet county, Norway. The 165-kilometre (103 mi) long river runs through Rendalen Municipality and Åmot Municipality in Innlandet county. This river is a tributary of the large river Glomma. Kjøllsæter Bridge connects the east and west side of the river. The 30-kilometre (19 mi) river Julussa flows from south through the Julussdalen valley and into the river Rena.

The Rena watershed has a drainage area of 3,967 square kilometres (1,532 sq mi). The river begins at the confluence of the rivers Tysla and Unsetåa which is just south of the Fonnåsfjellet mountain and just north of the village of Bergset. The river flows south through the lakes Lomnessjøen and Storsjøen and when the river reaches the village of Rena, just flows into the large river Glomma.

A tunnel has been built to transport part of the water from the upper Glomma river into the Rena river in order to optimize the production of electricity by nearby power plants.

== See also ==
- List of rivers in Norway
