= Østerdalen =

- District
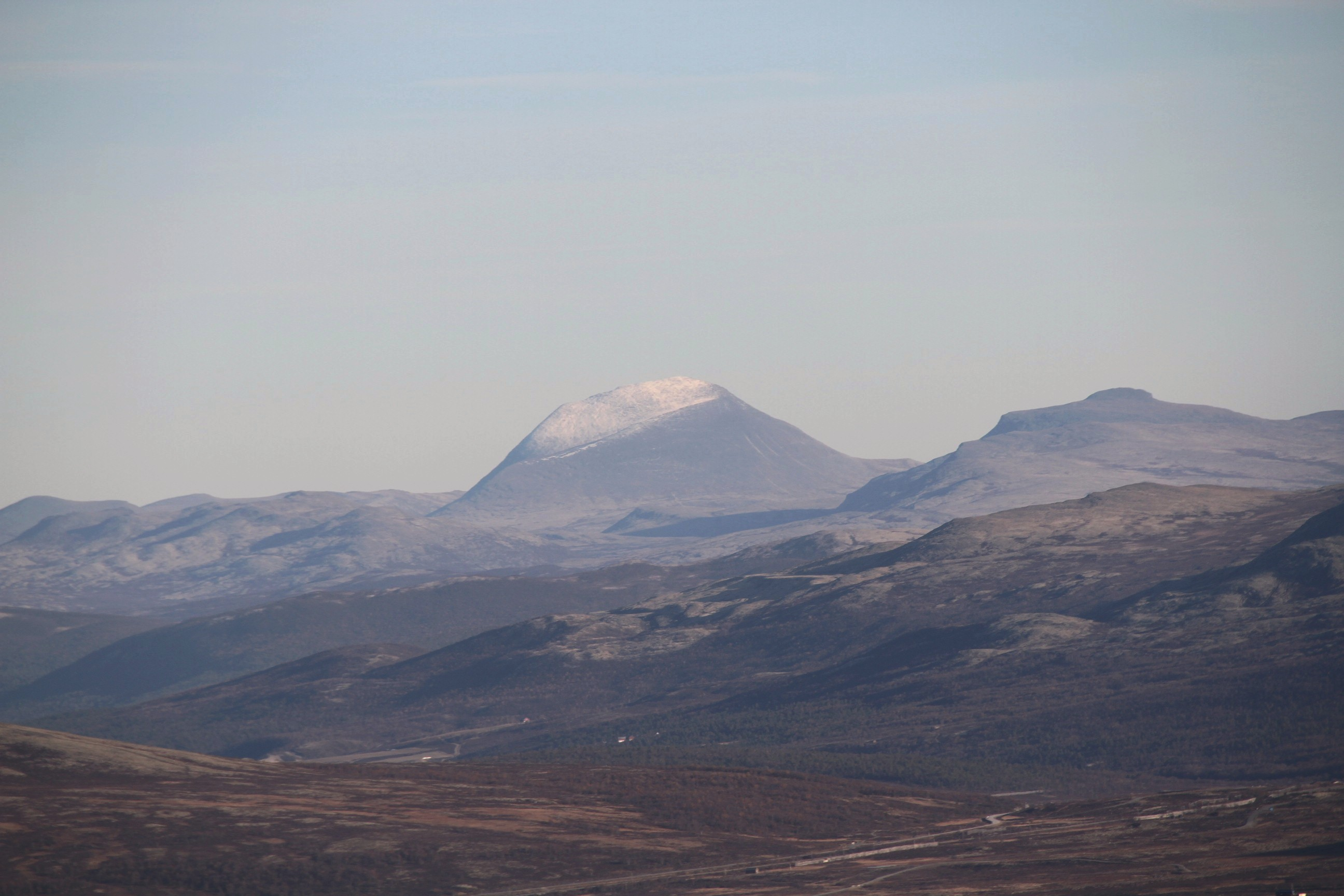
- Storsølnkletten, Alvdal

- Map of Innlandet county with Østerdalen highlighted in red
- Coordinates: 59.9111°N 10.7333°E
- Country: Norway
- County: Innlandet
- Region: Austlandet
- Largest town: Elverum

Area
  - Total: 19,386 km^{2} (7,485 sq mi)

Population (2019)
  - Total: 50,868
  - Density: 2.6240/km^{2} (6.7960/sq mi)
- Demonym: Østerdøl

Østerdalen (Urban East Norwegian: [ˈœ̂sːtəˌɖɑːɳ]) is a valley and traditional district in Innlandet county, in Eastern Norway. This area typically is described as the large Glåma river valley as well as all its tributary valleys. Østerdalen is often subdivided into Nord-Østerdal in the north, and Sør-Østerdal in the south. The more mountainous northern half of Østerdalen includes the municipalities of Rendalen, Alvdal, Folldal, Tynset, Tolga, and Os. The more forested southern half includes the municipalities of Elverum (which includes district's largest town, Elverum), Stor-Elvdal, Engerdal, Trysil and Åmot. Østerdalen historically also included Särna and Idre, which is now in Sweden.

== Geography ==
Østerdalen is quite wide in most places. Østerdalen is characterized by tranquil landscapes and rounded mountains. The lower valley is mostly covered by pine forests and more rolling hills. Typical of Østerdalen is that large parts of the forest floor are covered with reindeer moss, a variety of lichen. Further up in the valley has higher mountains and less forests and more farming areas.

== Glomma valley ==
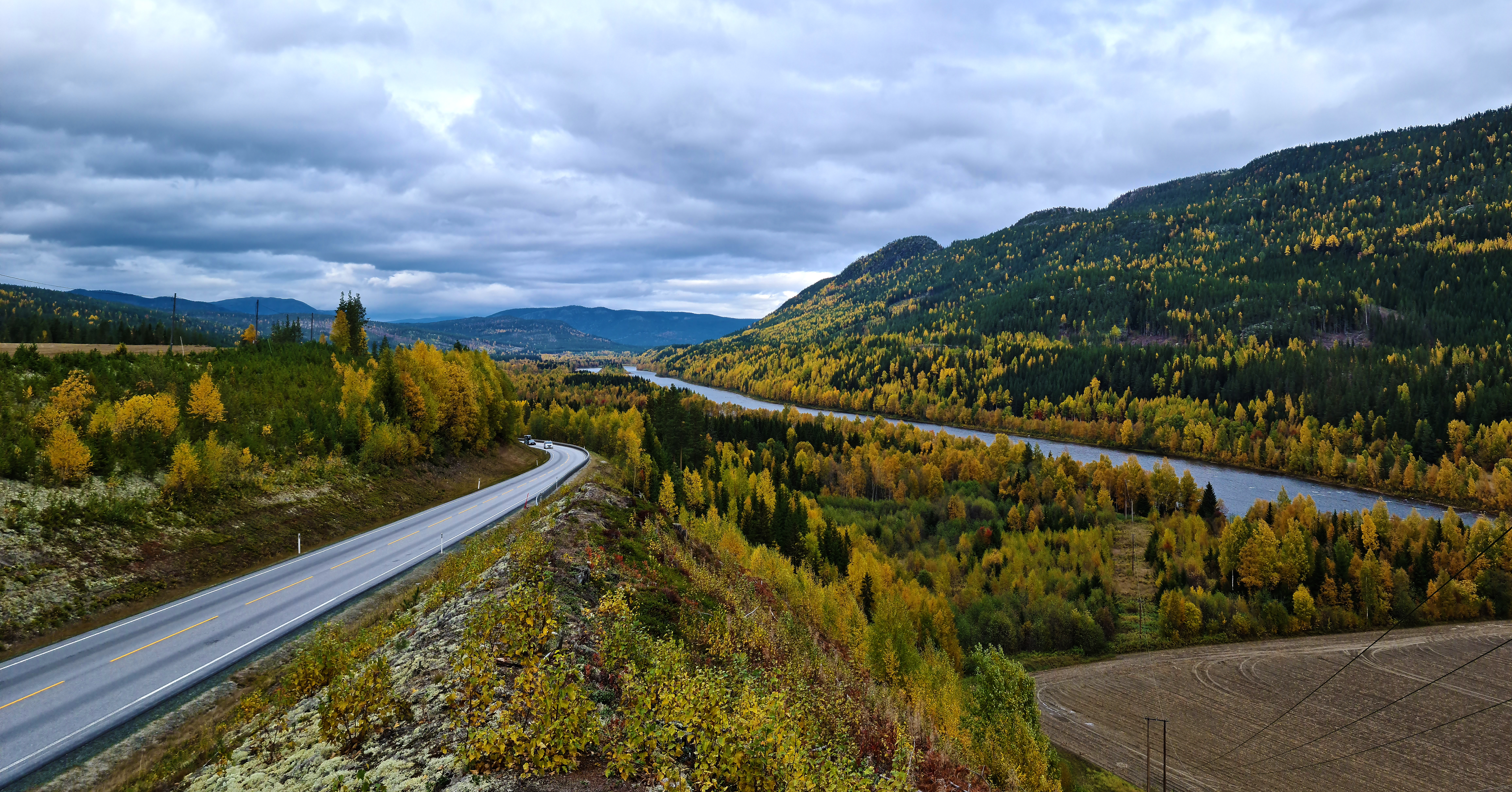
Østerdalen og Glåma, Stor-Elvdal

The main valley that runs through Østerdalen is the Glommadal (or Glåmdalen). The valley is formed by the river Glåma (also called the Glomma), which is the longest and largest river in Norway. From the lake Aursunden in the north and south to Elverum, the valley is called the Østerdalen. From that point south until Kongsvinger, it is referred to as Solør. As it turns westerly from Kongsvinger until Nes, it is called the Odalen valley. These designations are also traditional districts, reflecting the designations locals used for their valleys. The upper river valleys of Norwegian rivers have distinctive names which are vestiges of earlier cultural distinctions such as building styles, traditional clothing or bunad and domestic crafts.

== Etymology ==
The Old Norse form of the name was Øystridalir or Eystridalir which directly translates to "the eastern valleys". The name was referring to the valleys of the rivers Glomma, Rena, Trysilelva, and Österdalälven (the parishes Idre and Särna belonged to Norway until 1644). The modern form ends in -dalen which is the finite singular of the word dal which means "dale" or "valley".
