= Øversjødalen =

Village in Tolga Municipality, Norway

- Village
- Interactive map of Øversjødalen
- Location within Innlandet Location within Norway
- Coordinates: 62.20878°N 11.48181°E
- Country: Norway
- Region: Eastern Norway
- County: Innlandet
- District: Østerdalen
- Municipality: Tolga Municipality
- Elevation: 761 m (2,497 ft)
- Time zone: UTC+01:00 (CET)
  - Summer (DST): UTC+02:00 (CEST)
- Post Code: 2544 Øversjødalen

Øversjødalen is a village in Tolga Municipality in Innlandet county, Norway. It is located at the northern end of the lake Langsjøen. The village of Tolga lies about 40 kilometres (25 mi) to the southeast of Øversjødalen. The village of Hodalen lies about half-way between Øversjødalen and Tolga. Øversjødalen lies along County Road 26 which runs between the villages of Tolga and Drevsjø.

The mountain Elgspiggen lies about 8 kilometres (5.0 mi) to the southwest of the village. The Holøydalen Church is located on the west side of the village.
