= Langsjøen =

Lake in Innlandet, Norway

- Interactive map of the lake
- Location: Østerdalen, Innlandet
- Coordinates: 62.13055°N 11.63863°E
- Primary inflows: Hola river
- Primary outflows: Sømåa river
- Basin countries: Norway
- Max. length: 9 kilometres (5.6 mi)
- Max. width: 1 kilometre (0.62 mi)
- Surface area: 6.35 km^{2} (2.45 sq mi)
- Shore length^{1}: 27.26 kilometres (16.94 mi)
- Surface elevation: 709 metres (2,326 ft)
- References: NVE
- ^{1} Shore length is not a well-defined measure.

Langsjøen is a lake in Innlandet county, Norway. The 6.35-square-kilometre (2.45 sq mi) lake lies in the Sømådalen valley on the border of Tolga Municipality and Engerdal Municipality, just west of the large lake Femunden. The village of Øversjødalen lies at the north end of the lake and the mountain Elgspiggen lies about 10 kilometres (6.2 mi) west of the lake.

== See also ==
- List of lakes in Norway
