= Hodalen Church =

Church in Innlandet, Norway

- Hodalen kirke
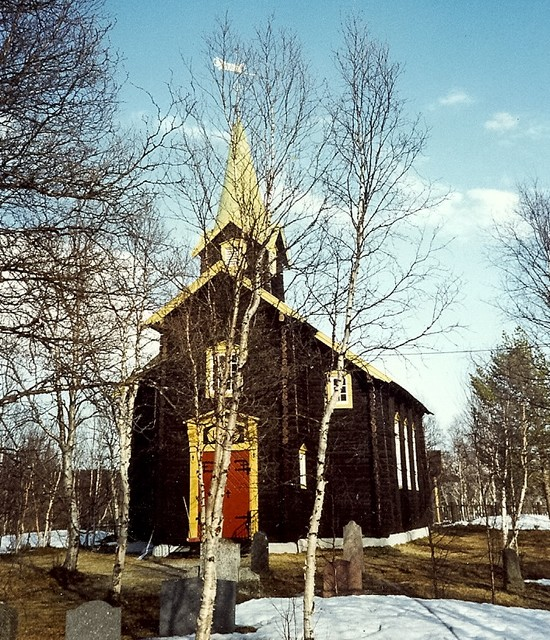
- View of the church
- Hodalen Church
- 62°21′44″N 11°11′57″E
- Location: Tolga Municipality, Innlandet
- Country: Norway
- Denomination: Church of Norway
- Churchmanship: Evangelical Lutheran

History
- Former name: Hodalen kapell
- Status: Parish church
- Founded: 1934
- Consecrated: 1934

Architecture
- Functional status: Active
- Architect: Andreas Sandmæl
- Architectural type: Long church
- Completed: 1934 (92 years ago)

Specifications
- Capacity: 120
- Materials: Wood

Administration
- Diocese: Hamar bispedømme
- Deanery: Nord-Østerdal prosti
- Parish: Hodalen
- Norwegian Cultural Heritage Site
- Type: Church
- Status: Not protected
- ID: 84588

Hodalen Church (Norwegian: Hodalen kirke) is a parish church of the Church of Norway in Tolga Municipality in Innlandet county, Norway. It is located in the village of Hodalen. It is the church for the Hodalen parish which is part of the Nord-Østerdal prosti (deanery) in the Diocese of Hamar. The brown, wooden church was built in a long church design in 1934 using plans drawn up by the architect Andreas Sandmæl. The church seats about 120 people.

== History ==
In 1899, the village of Hodalen got permission to build a cemetery so that people of the southern valley of Tolga had a place to bury their dead without the long trip to Tolga Church. During the 1920s, money was raised to build a chapel at the cemetery. Andreas Sandmæl was hired to design the new wooden chapel. It was completed and consecrated in 1934. Originally it was an annex chapel to the main Tolga Church, but later it was upgraded to be a parish church.

== Media gallery ==
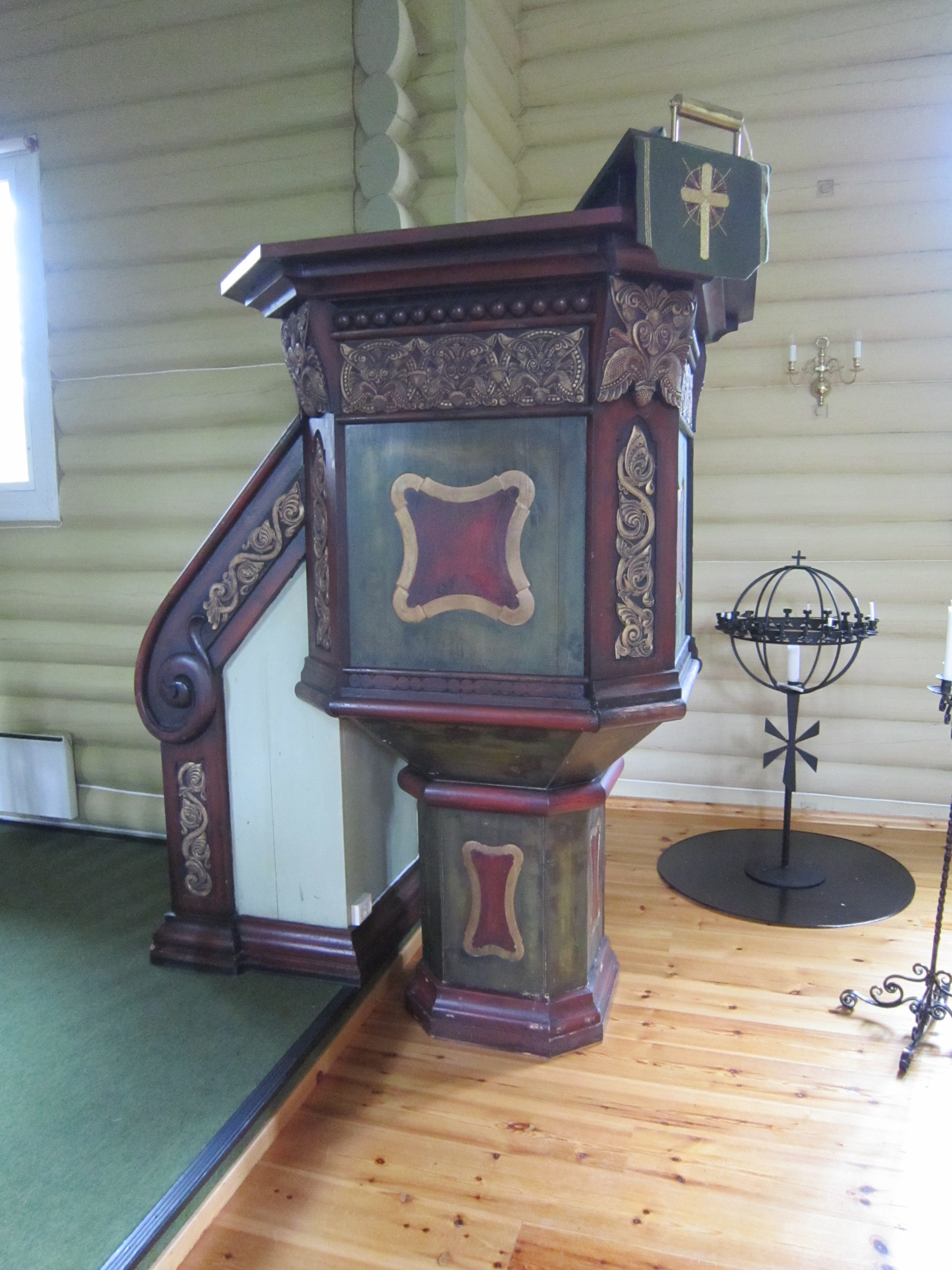
View of the pulpit inside the church

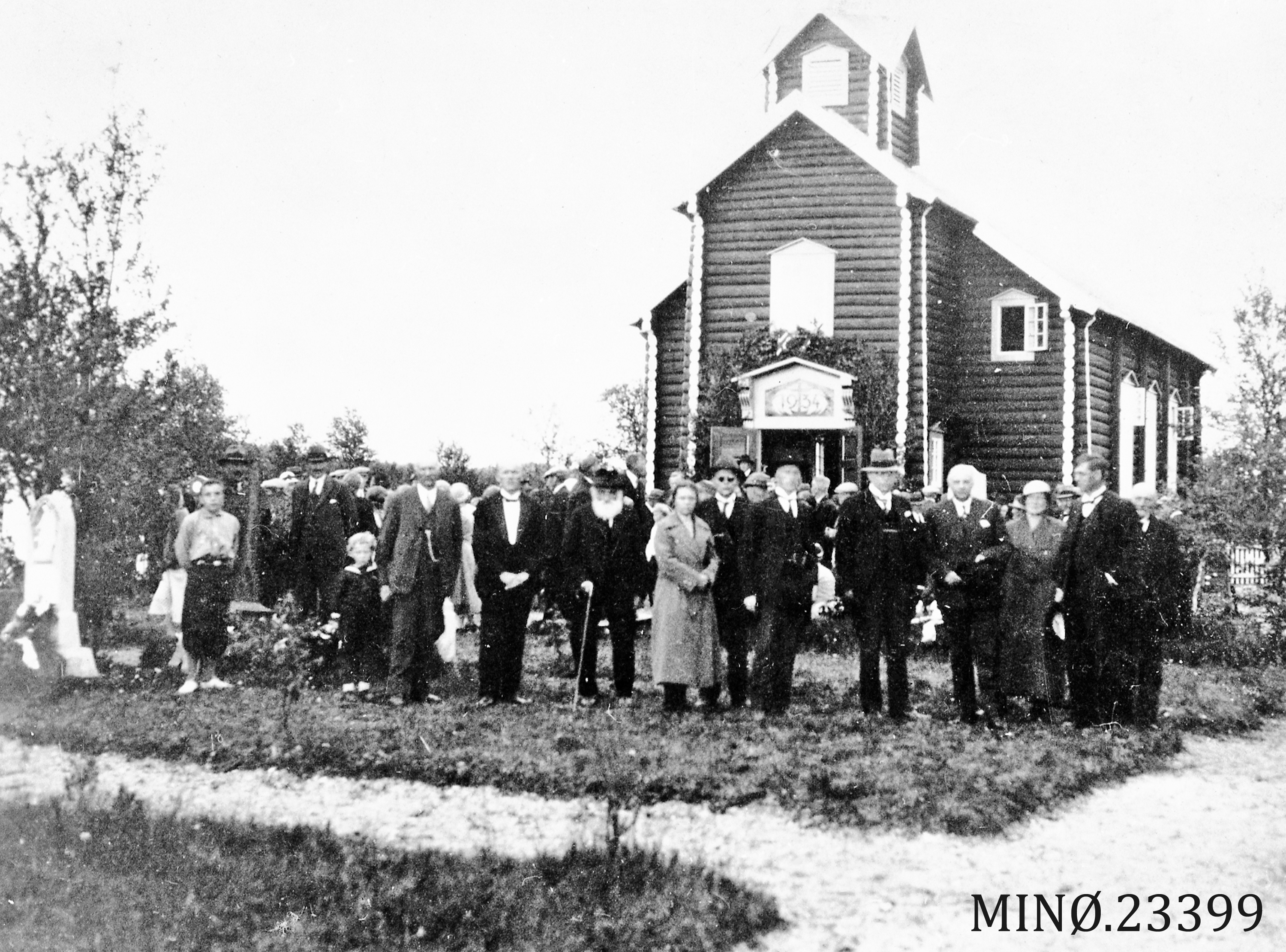
Photo of the church at its consecration

== See also ==
- List of churches in Hamar
