= Holøydalen Church =

Church in Innlandet, Norway

- Holøydalen kirke
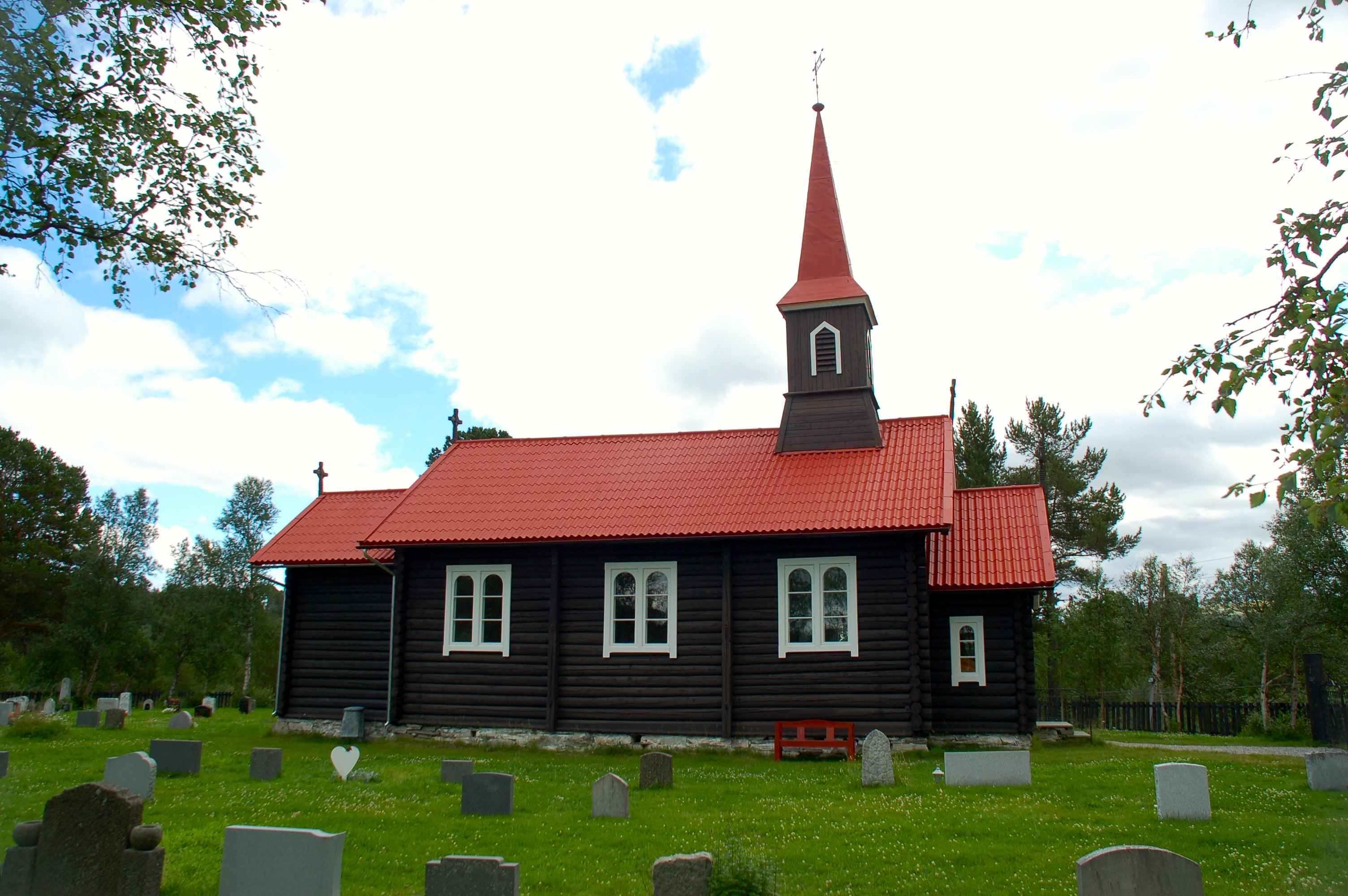
- View of the church
- Holøydalen Church
- 62°12′18″N 11°26′26″E
- Location: Tolga Municipality, Innlandet
- Country: Norway
- Denomination: Church of Norway
- Churchmanship: Evangelical Lutheran

History
- Former name: Holøydalen kapell
- Status: Parish church
- Founded: 1908
- Consecrated: 8 July 1908

Architecture
- Functional status: Active
- Architect: Victor Nordan
- Architectural type: Long church
- Completed: 1908 (118 years ago)

Specifications
- Capacity: 130
- Materials: Wood

Administration
- Diocese: Hamar bispedømme
- Deanery: Nord-Østerdal prosti
- Parish: Holøydalen
- Norwegian Cultural Heritage Site
- Type: Church
- Status: Not protected
- ID: 84618

Holøydalen Church (Norwegian: Holøydalen kirke) is a parish church of the Church of Norway in Tolga Municipality in Innlandet county, Norway. It is located in the village of Øversjødalen. It is the church for the Holøydalen parish which is part of the Nord-Østerdal prosti (deanery) in the Diocese of Hamar. The brown, wooden church was built in a long church design in 1908 using plans drawn up by the architect Victor Nordan. The church seats about 130 people.

== History ==
During the 1840s, planning for a chapel in Holøydalen began because the residents did not like the 40-kilometre (25 mi) long journey to Tolga Church. It took a long time before progress was made. In 1892, a cemetery was built just outside Øversjødalen. A small bell tower was built at the cemetery too. About 10 years later, planning began for a new chapel at the cemetery. Plans for the chapel were made by Victor Nordan. The new wooden building was consecrated on 8 July 1908. Originally, it was an annex chapel, but it was later upgraded to the status of parish church.

== Media gallery ==
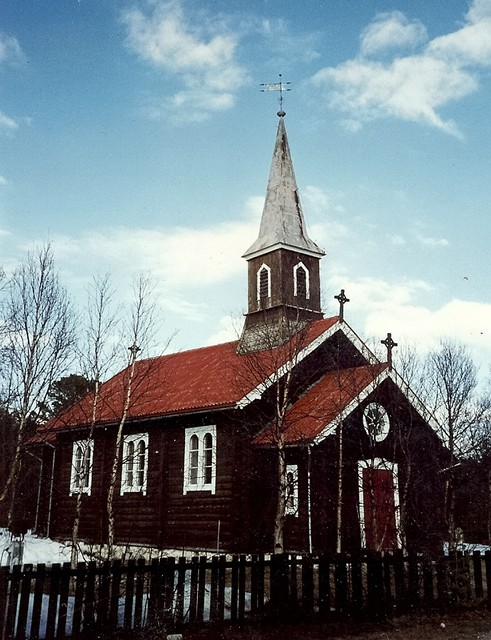

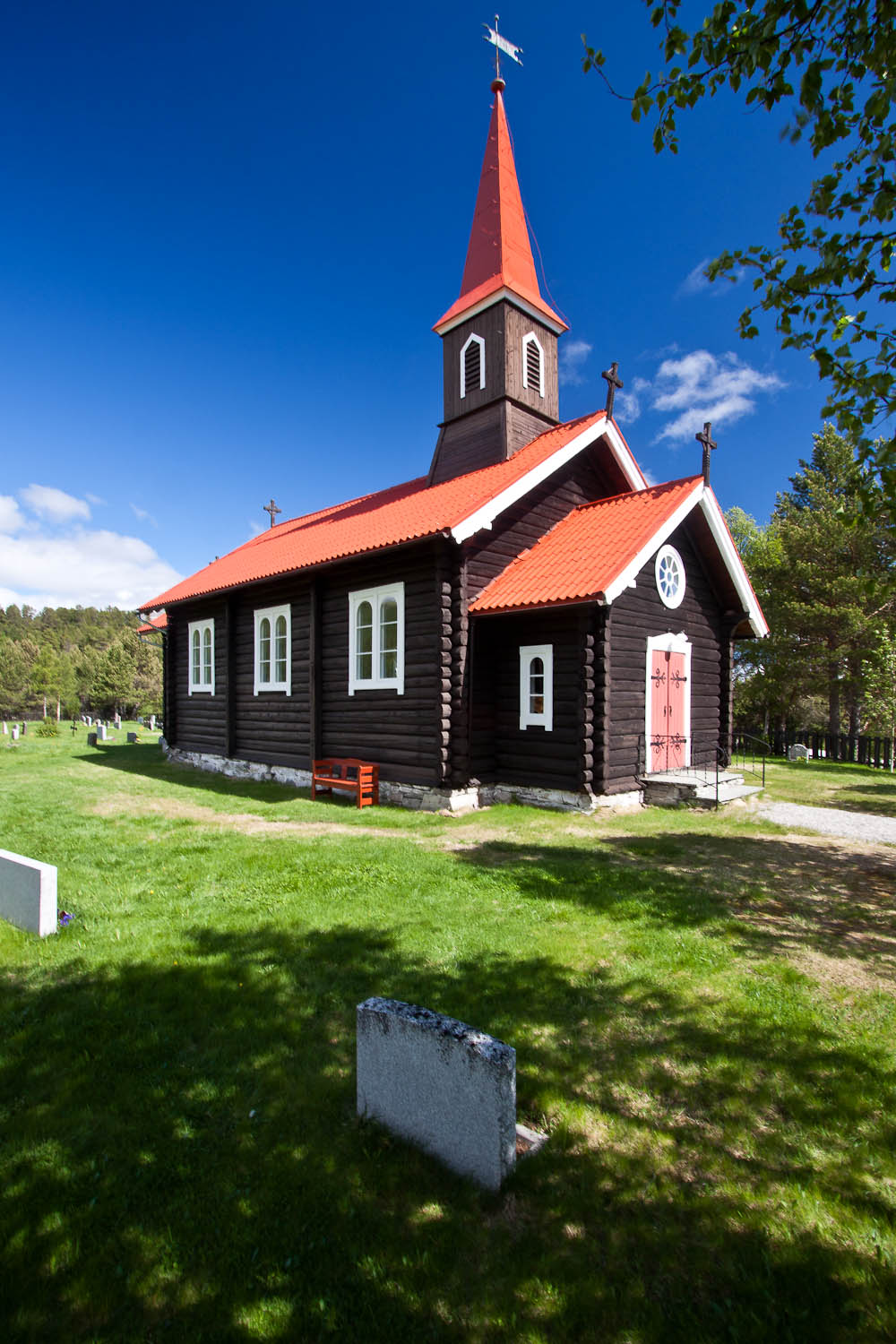

== See also ==
- List of churches in Hamar
