= Tolga (village) =

Village in Tolga Municipality, Norway

- Village
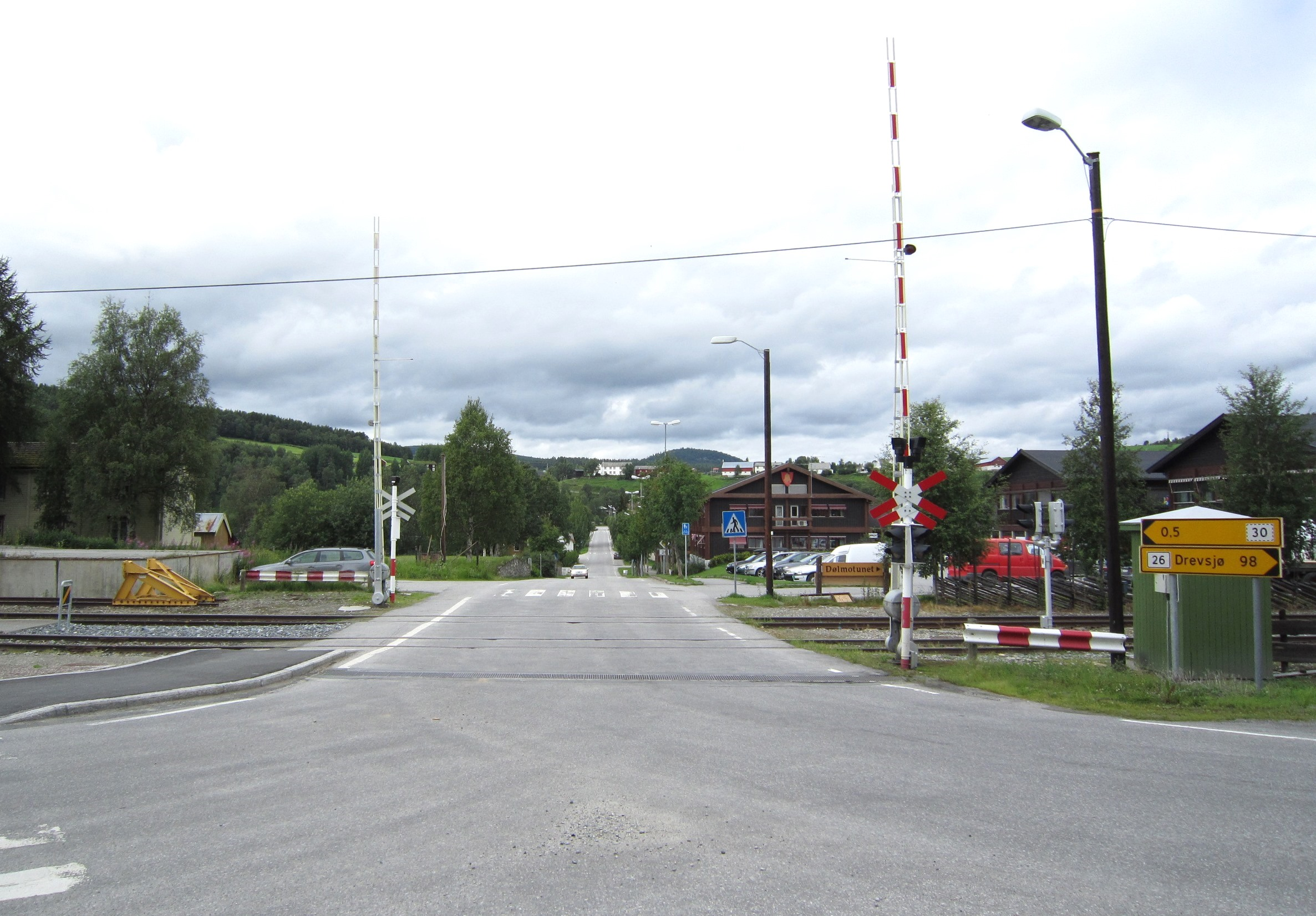
- View of the village
- Interactive map of Tolga
- Location within Innlandet Location within Norway
- Coordinates: 62.40899°N 10.99877°E
- Country: Norway
- Region: Eastern Norway
- County: Innlandet
- District: Østerdalen
- Municipality: Tolga Municipality

Area
  - Total: 1.07 km^{2} (0.41 sq mi)
- Elevation: 543 m (1,781 ft)

Population (2024)
  - Total: 627
  - Density: 586/km^{2} (1,520/sq mi)
- Time zone: UTC+01:00 (CET)
  - Summer (DST): UTC+02:00 (CEST)
- Post Code: 2540 Tolga

Tolga is the administrative centre of Tolga Municipality in Innlandet county, Norway. The village is located along the river Glåma, about 15 kilometres (9.3 mi) down river from the village of Os i Østerdalen and about 20 kilometres (12 mi) northeast of the town of Tynset. To the southeast of the village, lies the long Hodalen valley where the villages of Hodalen and Øversjødalen are located.

The 1.07-square-kilometre (260-acre) village has a population (2024) of 627 and a population density of 586 inhabitants per square kilometre (1,520/sq mi).

The large, octagonal Tolga Church is located in the village. The Rørosbanen railway line runs through the village, stopping at Tolga Station.
