= Tolga Municipality =

Municipality in Innlandet, Norway

Tolga Municipality Tolga kommune
- Municipality
- Tolgen herred (historic name)
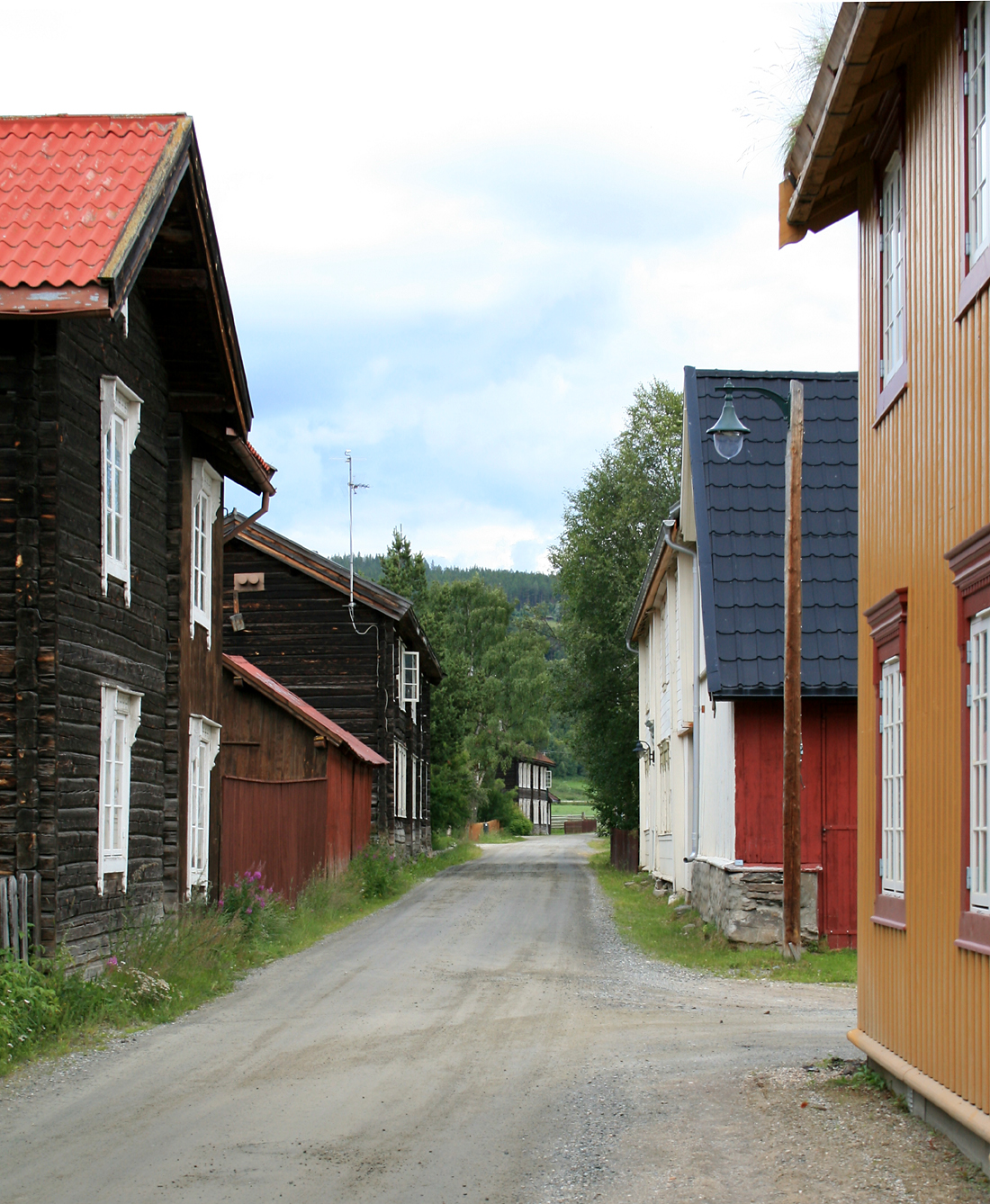

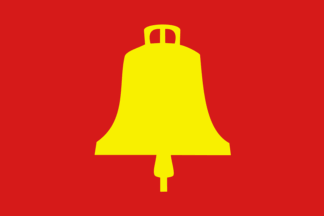
- Flag Coat of arms

- Innlandet within Norway

- Tolga within Innlandet
- Coordinates: 62°24′5″N 11°1′20″E
- Country: Norway
- County: Innlandet
- District: Østerdalen
- Established: 1 Jan 1838
  - Created as: Formannskapsdistrikt
- Disestablished: 1 Jan 1966
  - Succeeded by: Tolga-Os Municipality
- Re-established: 1 Jan 1976
  - Preceded by: Tolga-Os Municipality
- Administrative centre: Tolga

Government
  - Mayor (2019): Bjørnar Tollan Jordet (SV)

Area
  - Total: 1,122.56 km^{2} (433.42 sq mi)
  - Land: 1,097.24 km^{2} (423.65 sq mi)
  - Water: 25.32 km^{2} (9.78 sq mi) 2.3%
  - Rank: #99 in Norway
- Highest elevation: 1,604.79 m (5,265.1 ft)

Population (2024)
  - Total: 1,606
  - Rank: #301 in Norway
  - Density: 1.4/km^{2} (3.6/sq mi)
  - Change (10 years): ▼ −3.3%
- Demonym: Tolging

Official language
  - Norwegian form: Neutral
- Time zone: UTC+01:00 (CET)
  - Summer (DST): UTC+02:00 (CEST)
- ISO 3166 code: NO-3426
- Website: Official website

Tolga is a municipality in Innlandet county, Norway. It is located in the traditional district of Østerdalen. The administrative centre of the municipality is the village of Tolga. Other villages in the municipality include Hodalen, Øversjødalen, and Vingelen.

The 1,123-square-kilometre (434 sq mi) municipality is the 99th largest by area out of the 357 municipalities in Norway. Tolga Municipality is the 301st most populous municipality in Norway with a population of 1,606. The municipality's population density is 1.4 inhabitants per square kilometre (3.6/sq mi) and its population has decreased by 3.3% over the previous 10-year period.

== General information ==
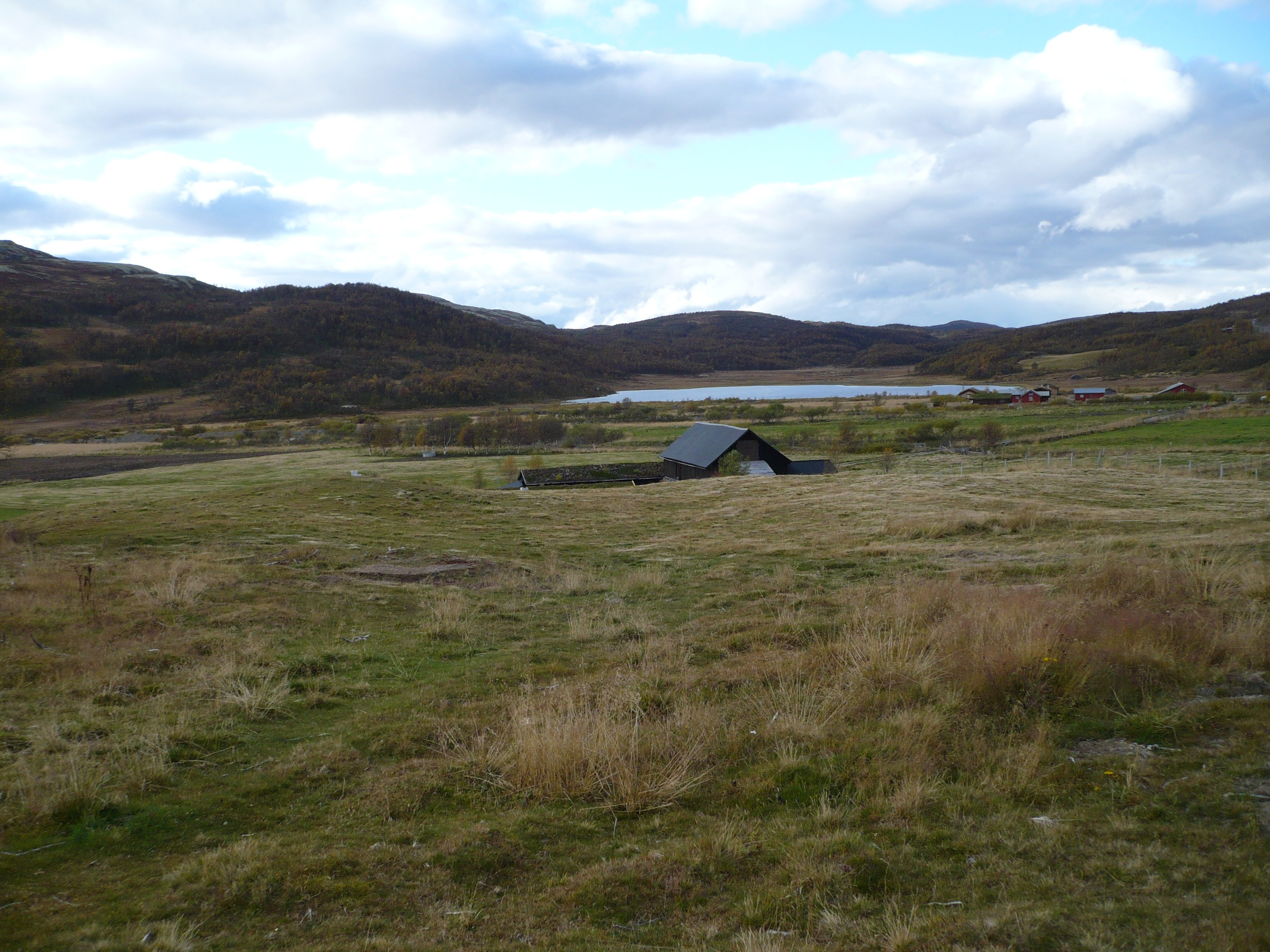
View of the mountain farms of Tolga

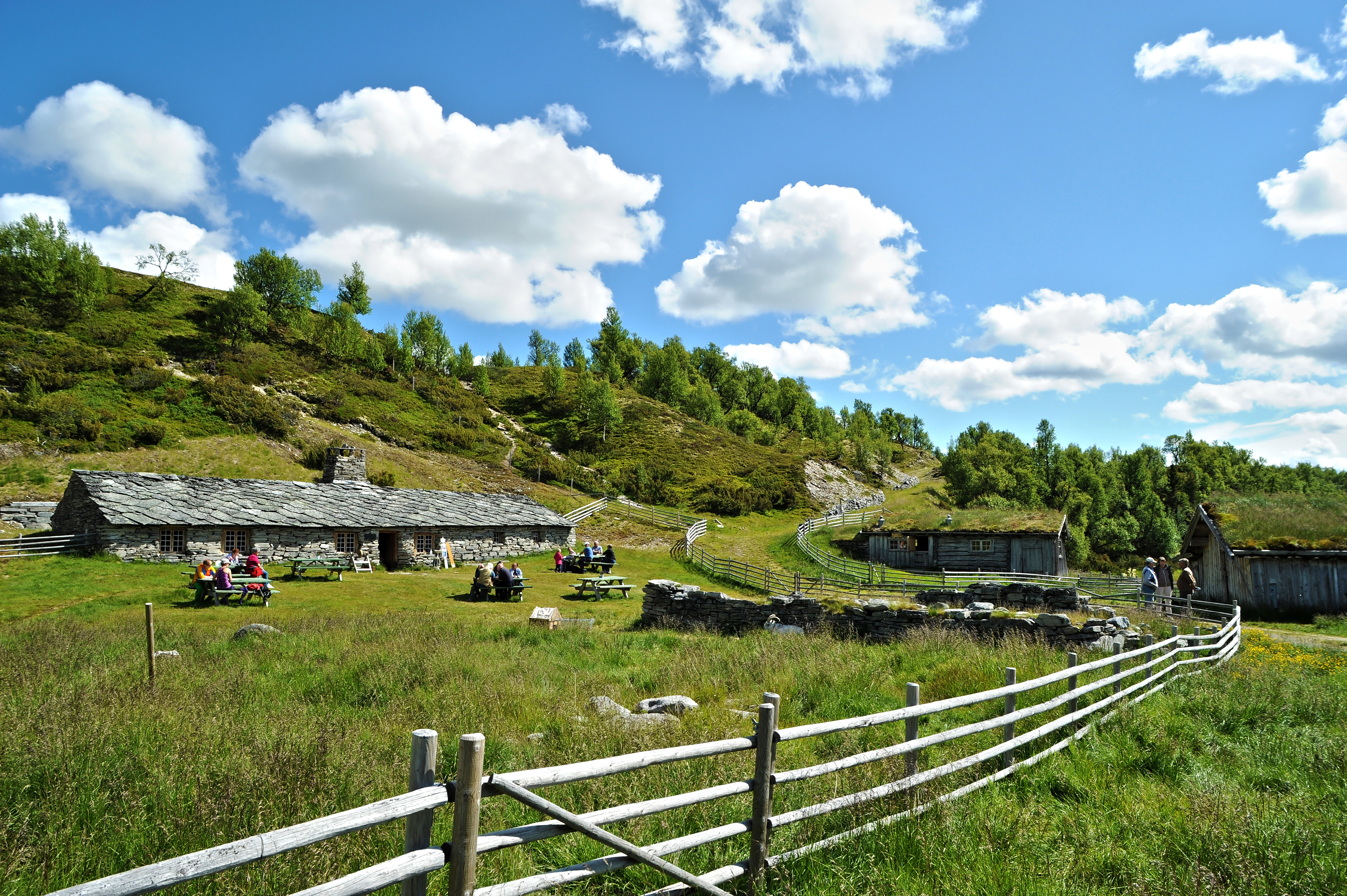
View of an old farm in Tolga

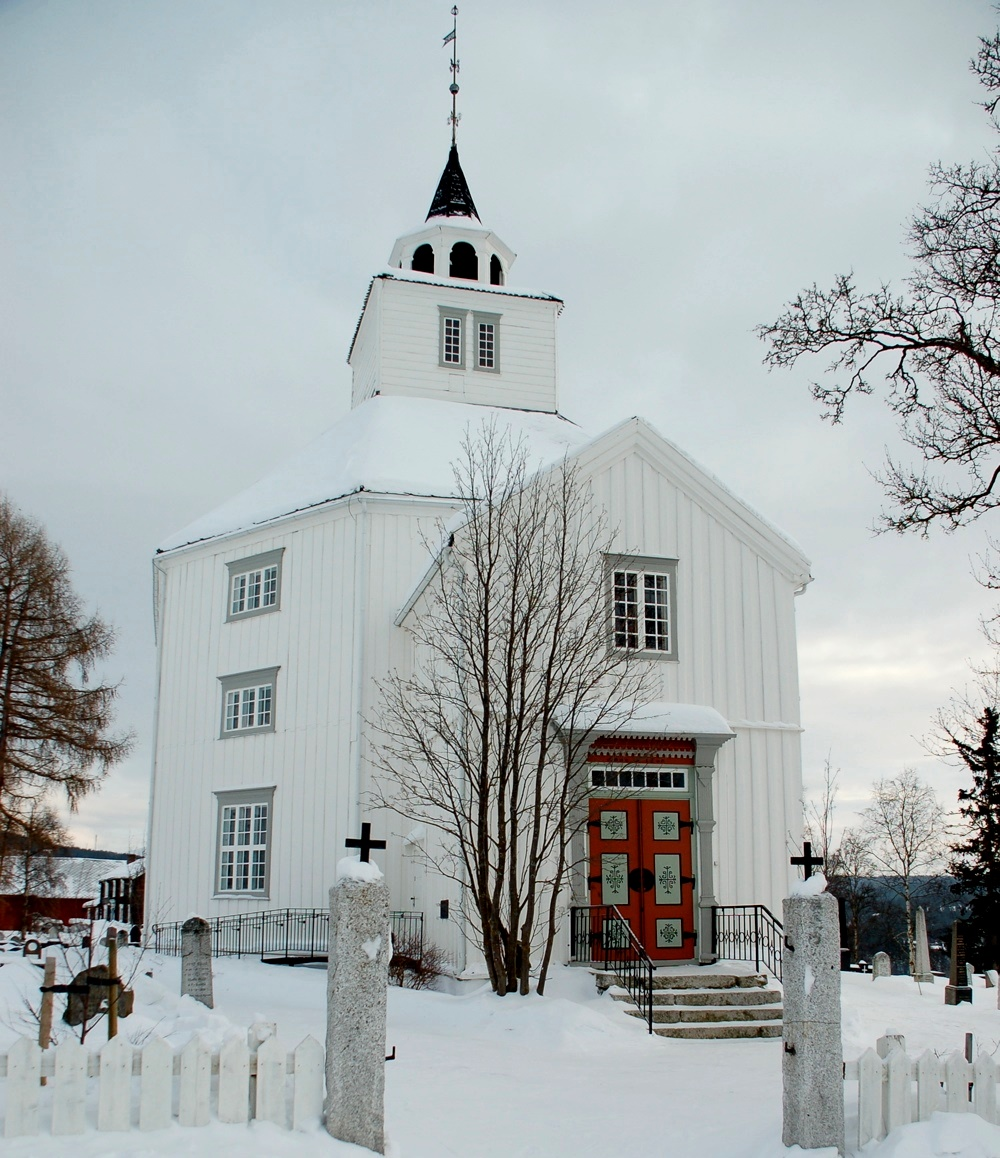
Tolga Church

The parish of Tolgen was established as a municipality on 1 January 1838 (see formannskapsdistrikt law). On 1 January 1911, the new Engerdal Municipality was established by merging the southeastern portion of Tolga Municipality (population: 201) and portions of neighboring Øvre Rendal Municipality, Ytre Rendal Municipality, and Trysil Municipality. On 1 July 1926, the northern parish of Os (population: 1,936) was separated to become the new Os Municipality. This left Tolga Municipality with 1,917 residents. In 1927, a small part of Tolga Municipality (population: 18) was transferred to the neighboring Os Municipality.

During the 1960s, there were many municipal mergers across Norway due to the work of the Schei Committee. On 1 January 1966, Tolga Municipality (population: 1,944) and Os Municipality (population: 2,015) were merged to form the new Tolga-Os Municipality. This merger was not well received by the residents and soon after the merger, they began working towards separating once again. On 1 January 1976, Tolga-Os Municipality was divided into Tolga Municipality (population: 1,865) and Os Municipality (population: 1,859), using their historic borders from before 1966.

Historically, the municipality was part of Hedmark county. On 1 January 2020, the municipality became a part of the newly-formed Innlandet county (after Hedmark and Oppland counties were merged).

=== Name ===
The municipality (originally the parish) is named after the old Tolga farm since the first Tolga Church was built there (in 1688). The name comes from the small river which flows through the area (now known as the river Tolja). The name of the river may come from the word toll (Old Norse: þǫll which means "young pine tree". Historically, the name of the municipality was spelled Tolgen. On 3 November 1917, a royal resolution changed the spelling of the name of the municipality to Tolga.

=== Coat of arms ===
The coat of arms was granted on 14 July 1989. The official blazon is "Gules, a bell Or" (Norwegian: I rødt ei gull klokke). This means the arms have a red field (background) and the charge is a bell. The bell has a tincture of Or which means it is commonly colored yellow, but if it is made out of metal, then gold is used. Tolga was home to the smeltehytte (a smelting hut) from 1666 to 1871. The bell represents the old bell from Amsterdam that was in a building in the village square since 1708. The smeltery was important because of the prevalence of mining in the area. The arms were designed by Jarle Skuseth. The municipal flag has the same design as the coat of arms.

=== Churches ===
The Church of Norway has four parishes (sokn) within Tolga Municipality. It is part of the Nord-Østerdal prosti (deanery) in the Diocese of Hamar.

Churches in Tolga
Parish (sokn)	Church name	Location of the church	Year built
Hodalen	Hodalen Church	Hodalen	1934
Holøydalen	Holøydalen Church	Øversjødalen	1908
Tolga	Tolga Church	Tolga	1840
Vingelen	Vingelen Church	Vingelen	1880

== Government ==
Tolga Municipality is responsible for primary education (through 10th grade), outpatient health services, senior citizen services, welfare and other social services, zoning, economic development, and municipal roads and utilities. The municipality is governed by a municipal council of directly elected representatives. The mayor is indirectly elected by a vote of the municipal council. The municipality is under the jurisdiction of the Hedmarken og Østerdal District Court and the Eidsivating Court of Appeal.

=== Municipal council ===
The municipal council (Kommunestyre) of Tolga Municipality is made up of 15 representatives that are elected to four year terms. The tables below show the current and historical composition of the council by political party.

Tolga kommunestyre 2023–2027
Party name (in Norwegian)	Number of representatives
Labour Party (Arbeiderpartiet)	2
Centre Party (Senterpartiet)	5
Socialist Left Party (Sosialistisk Venstreparti)	7
Liberal Party (Venstre)	1
Total number of members:	15

Tolga kommunestyre 2019–2023
Party name (in Norwegian)	Number of representatives
Labour Party (Arbeiderpartiet)	3
Centre Party (Senterpartiet)	6
Socialist Left Party (Sosialistisk Venstreparti)	5
Liberal Party (Venstre)	1
Total number of members:	15

Tolga kommunestyre 2015–2019
Party name (in Norwegian)	Number of representatives
Labour Party (Arbeiderpartiet)	3
Centre Party (Senterpartiet)	7
Socialist Left Party (Sosialistisk Venstreparti)	4
Liberal Party (Venstre)	1
Total number of members:	15

Tolga kommunestyre 2011–2015
Party name (in Norwegian)	Number of representatives
Labour Party (Arbeiderpartiet)	3
Centre Party (Senterpartiet)	6
Socialist Left Party (Sosialistisk Venstreparti)	4
Liberal Party (Venstre)	2
Total number of members:	15

Tolga kommunestyre 2007–2011
Party name (in Norwegian)	Number of representatives
Labour Party (Arbeiderpartiet)	3
Centre Party (Senterpartiet)	8
Socialist Left Party (Sosialistisk Venstreparti)	3
Free Voters (Frie Velgere)	1
Total number of members:	15

Tolga kommunestyre 2003–2007
Party name (in Norwegian)	Number of representatives
Labour Party (Arbeiderpartiet)	6
Centre Party (Senterpartiet)	6
Socialist Left Party (Sosialistisk Venstreparti)	2
Free Voters (Frie Velgere)	1
Total number of members:	15

Tolga kommunestyre 1999–2003
Party name (in Norwegian)	Number of representatives
Labour Party (Arbeiderpartiet)	7
Centre Party (Senterpartiet)	8
Socialist Left Party (Sosialistisk Venstreparti)	2 FFFF
Total number of members:	19

Tolga kommunestyre 1995–1999
Party name (in Norwegian)	Number of representatives
Labour Party (Arbeiderpartiet)	4
Centre Party (Senterpartiet)	10
Socialist Left Party (Sosialistisk Venstreparti)	2
Free Voters (Frie Velgere)	3
Total number of members:	19

Tolga kommunestyre 1991–1995
Party name (in Norwegian)	Number of representatives
Labour Party (Arbeiderpartiet)	5
Centre Party (Senterpartiet)	10
Socialist Left Party (Sosialistisk Venstreparti)	2
Free Voters (Frie Velgere)	2
Total number of members:	19

Tolga kommunestyre 1987–1991
Party name (in Norwegian)	Number of representatives
Labour Party (Arbeiderpartiet)	6
Conservative Party (Høyre)	1
Centre Party (Senterpartiet)	10
Socialist Left Party (Sosialistisk Venstreparti)	2
Total number of members:	19

Tolga kommunestyre 1983–1987
Party name (in Norwegian)	Number of representatives
Labour Party (Arbeiderpartiet)	5
Conservative Party (Høyre)	1
Centre Party (Senterpartiet)	9
Socialist Left Party (Sosialistisk Venstreparti)	2
Total number of members:	19

Tolga kommunestyre 1979–1983
Party name (in Norwegian)	Number of representatives
Labour Party (Arbeiderpartiet)	4
Centre Party (Senterpartiet)	9
Free Voters (Frie Velgere)	6
Total number of members:	19

Tolga kommunestyre 1975–1979*
Party name (in Norwegian)	Number of representatives
Labour Party (Arbeiderpartiet)	3
Centre Party (Senterpartiet)	11
Free Voters (Frie Velgere)	5
Total number of members:	19
Note: On 1 January 1976, Tolga-Os Municipality was divided into Tolga Municipality and Os Municipality.

Tolga kommunestyre 1963–1966*
Party name (in Norwegian)	Number of representatives
Labour Party (Arbeiderpartiet)	5
Centre Party (Senterpartiet)	10
Local List(s) (Lokale lister)	2
Total number of members:	17
Note: On 1 January 1966, Tolga Municipality and Os Municipality were merged to form the new Tolga-Os Municipality.

Tolga herredsstyre 1959–1963
Party name (in Norwegian)	Number of representatives
Labour Party (Arbeiderpartiet)	5
Centre Party (Senterpartiet)	10
Local List(s) (Lokale lister)	2
Total number of members:	17

Tolga herredsstyre 1955–1959
Party name (in Norwegian)	Number of representatives
Labour Party (Arbeiderpartiet)	3
Farmers' Party (Bondepartiet)	10
Local List(s) (Lokale lister)	4
Total number of members:	17

Tolga herredsstyre 1951–1955
Party name (in Norwegian)	Number of representatives
Labour Party (Arbeiderpartiet)	5
Farmers' Party (Bondepartiet)	11
Total number of members:	16

Tolga herredsstyre 1947–1951
Party name (in Norwegian)	Number of representatives
Labour Party (Arbeiderpartiet)	5
Joint List(s) of Non-Socialist Parties (Borgerlige Felleslister)	11
Total number of members:	16

Tolga herredsstyre 1945–1947
Party name (in Norwegian)	Number of representatives
Labour Party (Arbeiderpartiet)	5
Farmers' Party (Bondepartiet)	4
Joint List(s) of Non-Socialist Parties (Borgerlige Felleslister)	6
Local List(s) (Lokale lister)	1
Total number of members:	16

Tolga herredsstyre 1937–1941*
Party name (in Norwegian)	Number of representatives
Labour Party (Arbeiderpartiet)	5
Farmers' Party (Bondepartiet)	9
Liberal Party (Venstre)	1
Local List(s) (Lokale lister)	1
Total number of members:	16
Note: Due to the German occupation of Norway during World War II, no elections were held for new municipal councils until after the war ended in 1945.

=== Mayors ===
The mayor (Norwegian: ordfører) of Tolga is the political leader of the municipality and the chairperson of the municipal council. Here is a list of people who have held this position:

- 1838–1839: Svend Stenersen
- 1840–1843: John Simensen Grue
- 1843–1847: Thore N. Røe
- 1847–1855: John Simensen Grue
- 1855–1859: Thore N. Røe
- 1859–1863: John Simensen Grue
- 1863–1867: Thore N. Røe
- 1867–1879: J. Estensen
- 1879–1893: O.I. Strand
- 1893–1896: Elias Gjelten
- 1896–1899: Martinus Gjelten
- 1899–1902: Iver O. Sagbakken
- 1902–1908: Anders Urset
- 1908–1914: Iver O. Sagbakken
- 1914–1926: Tore Hummelvoll
- 1926–1931: Per Aaseng
- 1932–1934: O.I. Sagbakken
- 1935–1937: Embret Nygård
- 1938–1941: Nils Bakken
- 1941–1944: Lars Eide (NS)
- 1945–1945: Esten P. Moen
- 1946–1948: Erling Aas-Eng, Sr. (Bp)
- 1949–1951: Jon Hulbækdal
- 1952-1965: Erling Aas-Eng, Sr. (Bp)
- (1966–1975: Part of Tolga-Os Municipality)
- 1976–1985: Anders Johnsgård (Sp)
- 1985–1986: Jon Vingelen (Sp)
- 1986–1999: Lars Buttingsrud (Sp)
- 1999–2007: Marit Gilleberg (Ap)
- 2007–2011: Erling Aas-Eng (Sp)
- 2011–2019: Ragnhild Aashaug (Sp)
- 2019–present: Bjørnar Tollan Jordet (SV)

== Geography ==
Tolga lies in the northeastern part of Innlandet county. The river Glåma runs through the municipality. The highest point in the municipality is the 1,604.79-metre (5,265.1 ft) tall mountain Elgspiggen, located on the border with Rendalen Municipality. The mountain Håmmålsfjellet lies on the border with Os Municipality. The lake Langsjøen is located just south of the village of Øversjødalen in the southeastern part of the municipality.

The municipality is bordered in the east by Tynset Municipality, in the south by Rendalen Municipality, and in the east by Engerdal Municipality and Os Municipality, all in Innlandet county.

== Notable people ==
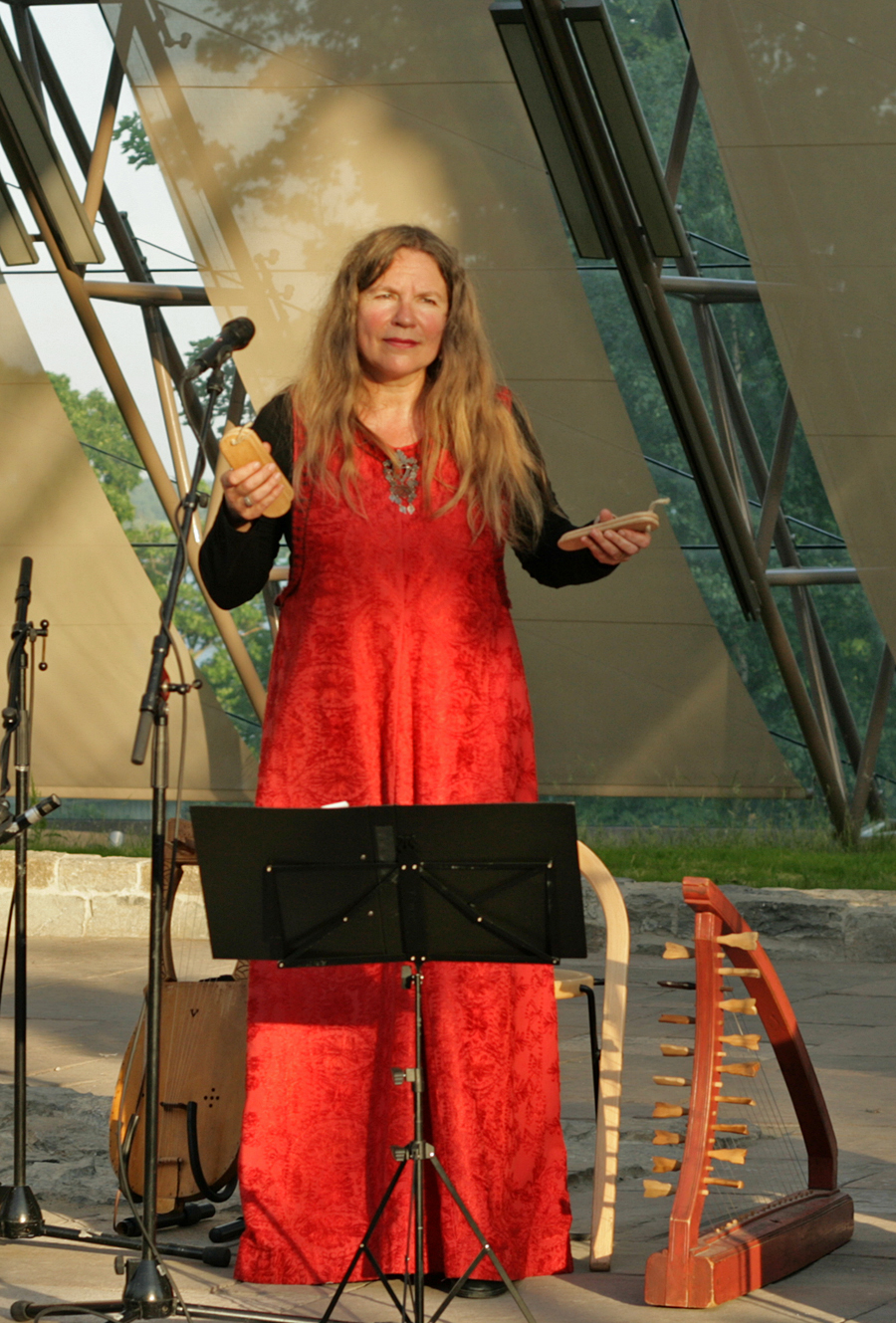
Tone Hulbækmo, 2008

- Kaleb Nytrøen (1905 in Tolga – 1994), a police officer who helped develop the Norwegian Police Security Service
- Egil Storbekken (1911 in Tolga – 2002), a folk musician and composer
- Arnljot Eggen (1923 in Tolga – 2009), a journalist and teacher who wrote poetry, plays and children's books
- Olav Jordet (born 1939 in Tolga), a former biathlete, bronze medallist at the 1964 Summer Olympics, and team silver medallist in the 1968 Summer Olympics
- Hans Fredrik Jacobsen (born 1954), a musician and composer who is based in Tolga
- Tone Hulbækmo (born 1957 in Tolga), a singer and musician
- Olav Viksmo-Slettan (born 1965 in Tolga), a radio and TV reporter for the NBC
- Hans Hulbækmo (born 1989 in Tolga), a composer and musician on drums and percussion
- Alf Hulbækmo (born 1992 in Tolga), a composer, singer, and musician on piano, keyboards, harmonica and saxophone
