= Kaleb Nytrøen =

Norwegian police officer

- Born: 23 October 1905; Tolga, Norway
- Died: 29 April 1994 (aged 88)
- Occupation: Police officer

Kaleb Nytrøen (23 October 1905 – 29 April 1994) was a Norwegian police officer. He was born in Tolga. He started his service in the police in 1930. From 1937 he was involved with the establishment of Overvåkningstjenesten, a surveyance department in the police force. From 1947 he took part in the establishment and development of the Police Surveillance Agency, in cooperation with Asbjørn Bryhn. During the Cold War he was the main responsible for surveyance of Soviet activities in Norway.
