= Sølensjøen =

Lake in Rendalen, Norway

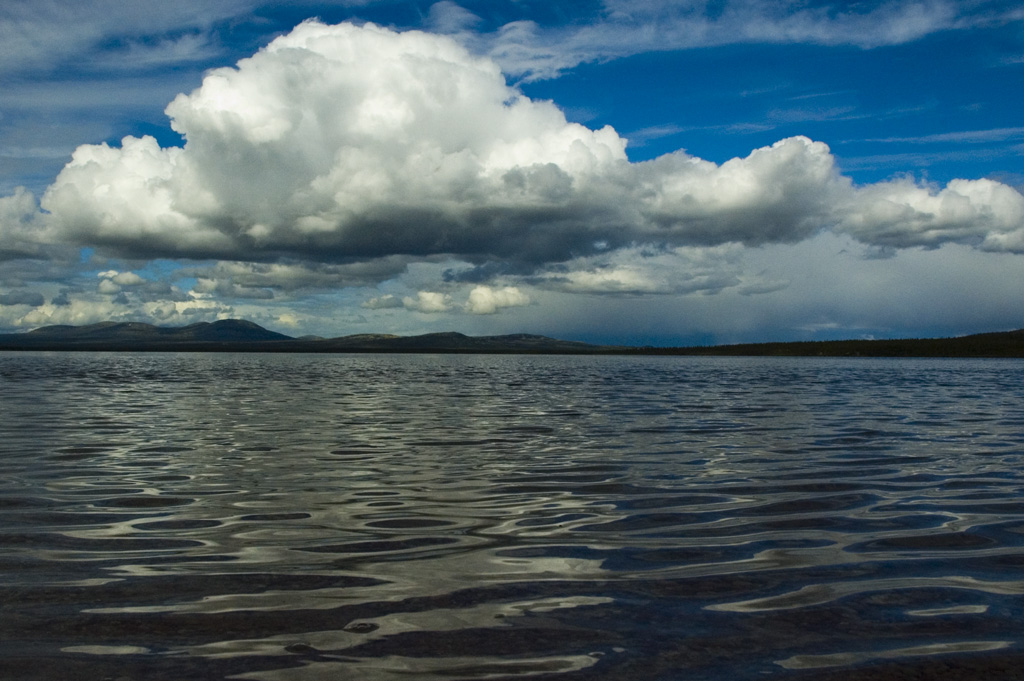
- View of Lake Sølensjøen
- Interactive map of the lake
- Location: Rendalen Municipality, Innlandet
- Coordinates: 61°56′39″N 11°34′32″E
- Primary inflows: Årevja river
- Primary outflows: Sølna river
- Catchment area: Femundelva
- Basin countries: Norway
- Max. length: 14 kilometres (8.7 mi)
- Max. width: 3 kilometres (1.9 mi)
- Surface area: 22.43 km^{2} (8.66 sq mi)
- Max. depth: 58 metres (190 ft)
- Shore length^{1}: 42.67 kilometres (26.51 mi)
- Surface elevation: 688 metres (2,257 ft)
- References: NVE
- ^{1} Shore length is not a well-defined measure.

Sølensjøen is a lake in Rendalen Municipality in Innlandet county, Norway. The 22.43-square-kilometre (8.66 sq mi) lake is part of the 46-mile (74 km) long Sølna river system. The lake itself is about 14 kilometres (8.7 mi) long and 3 kilometres (1.9 mi) wide, and its greatest depth is 58 metres (190 ft). Sølensjøen has abundant populations of Arctic char, trout, grayling, whitefish, pike, burbot and perch, which has made it the locale of Norway's largest inland fishing village Fiskevollen which is located on its northwestern shore. The mountain Sølen lies about 5 kilometres (3.1 mi) to the southwest of the lake.

== See also ==
- List of lakes in Norway
