= Erling Aas-Eng =

Norwegian politician (born 1965)

Norwegian Parliament (Deputy representative)
- In office 1993–1997

Mayor of Tolga Municipality
- In office 2007–2011

Personal details
- Political party: Centre Party

Erling Aas-Eng (born 9 January 1965) is a Norwegian politician for the Centre Party.

He served as a deputy representative to the Norwegian Parliament from Hedmark during the term 1993–1997.

On the local level, Aas-Eng was the mayor of Tolga Municipality from 2007 to 2011.
