= Pulpit altar =

Church element combining altar and pulpit

A pulpit altar is a feature of some Christian places of worship. It is the combination of an altar and its altarpiece with a pulpit placed immediately above, forming one unit. In larger churches a pipe organ may be found placed above the pulpit.

== Origin ==
This design became popular in Protestant German-speaking lands after the Reformation to signify that preaching of the Word of God in the worship service is integral with the delivery of sacraments (Holy Communion) which takes place on the altar below. In German a pulpit altar is termed 'Kanzelaltar'. Pulpit altars were quite popular in Upper Franconia, southern Lower Saxony, the Bergisches Land, and the Saxon duchies of today's state of Thuringia.

The oldest surviving pulpit altar is in the castle chapel of Wilhelmsburg Castle in Schmalkalden (today Thuringia), which was built under William IV, Landgrave of Hesse-Kassel in 1585–1590.

Another early example of a pulpit altar was built in the castle chapel of Callenberg Castle in Coburg (today Upper Franconia in Bavaria), built under Duke Johann Casimir of Saxe-Coburg and it was inaugurated in 1618.

In the 19th century the Eisenach regulation of 1861 rejected the pulpit altar and required Lutheran churches to have a free-standing arrangement of the altar in a sanctuary, bringing the design closer to the medieval Catholic setup of the chancel.

== In Indonesia ==
In some Protestant churches of the Indonesia, the preacher pulpit generally located in the center of the altar, which usually occurs in the Batak Christian Protestant Church (Indonesian: Huria Kristen Batak Protestan), one of the largest Lutheran churches in the Southeast Asia. This is due to the influence of the Dutch colonisation and Dutch Calvinist sect, making it a colonial legacy that remains to this day.

The Batak Christian Protestant Church moved the pulpit to the right side, which functions as the place for the minister to preach. Meanwhile, it's have available room on the left side utilised for another pulpit as of the place to church notices. This setup is more in line with other Lutheran churches. Traditionally, the Batak Christian Protestant Church is a separate church from the Rhenish Missionary Society comes from the Germany, which are characterised of the composite denomination that includes a Lutheran element compared to the original Lutheran churches in the Nordic countries.

== In Norway ==
Many churches in Norway installed pulpit altars (Norwegian: prekestolalter) during the second half of the 18th century and especially in the first three decades of the 19th century. According to Hosar, there are at least 58 pulpit altars in Norwegian churches.

Pulpit altars can be seen in the Nykirken in Bergen (reconstruction 1756), Gamlebyen Church in Oslo (1796), Røros Church (1784), Kongsberg Church (1740–61), and Sør-Fron Church (1792). Pulpit altars were also used in the octagonal churches such as in Hadsel Church, Klæbu Church, and Tynset Church.

The pulpit altar went out of fashion after a time, partly because the altar seemed to be subordinate to the pulpit. In Klæbu Church, a pulpit was later set up on the floor because of the priest's fear of heights. In 1749, the old Hopen Church on Smøla was probably the first church in Norway to get a pulpit altar.

== Media gallery ==
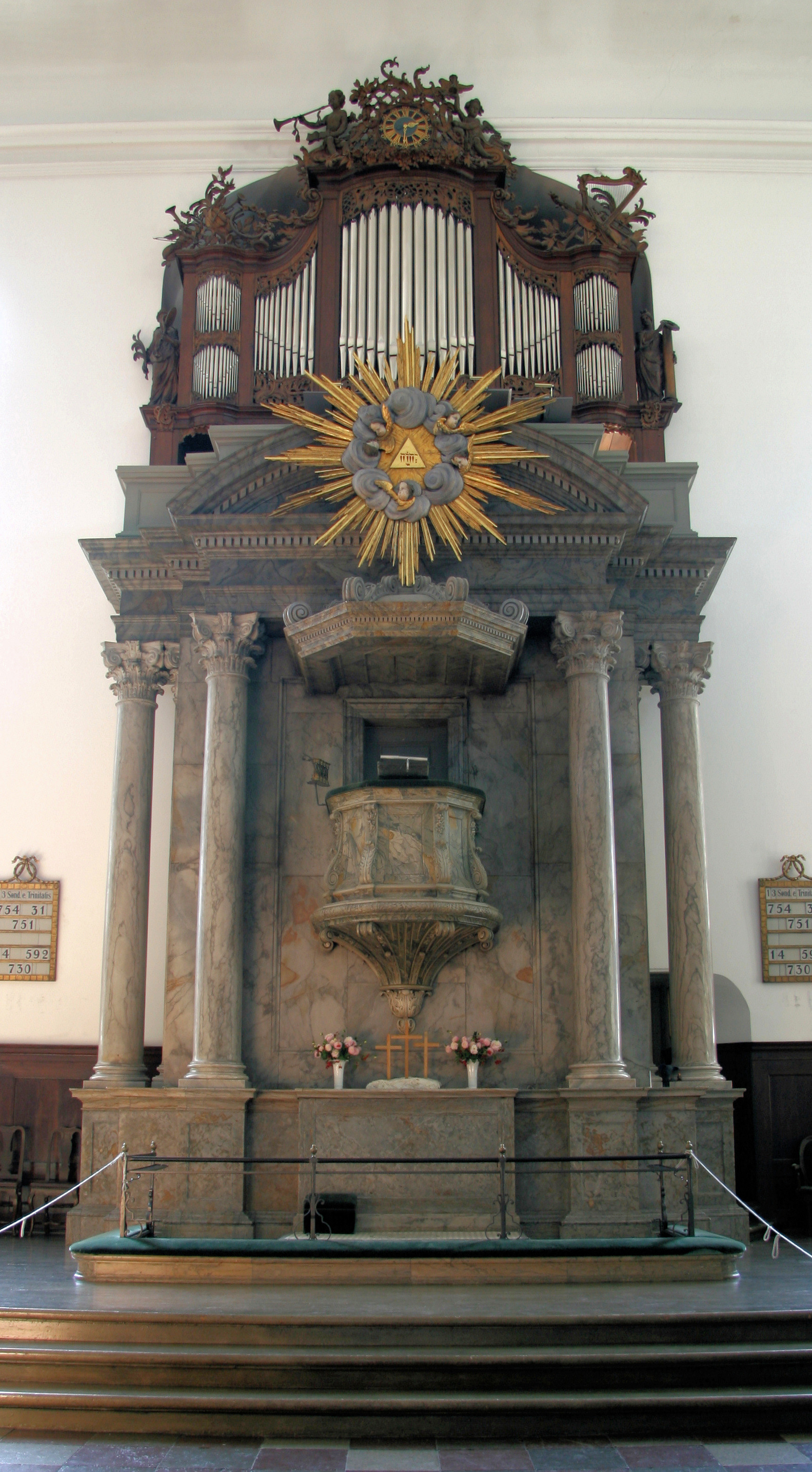
Christian's Church, Copenhagen, Denmark

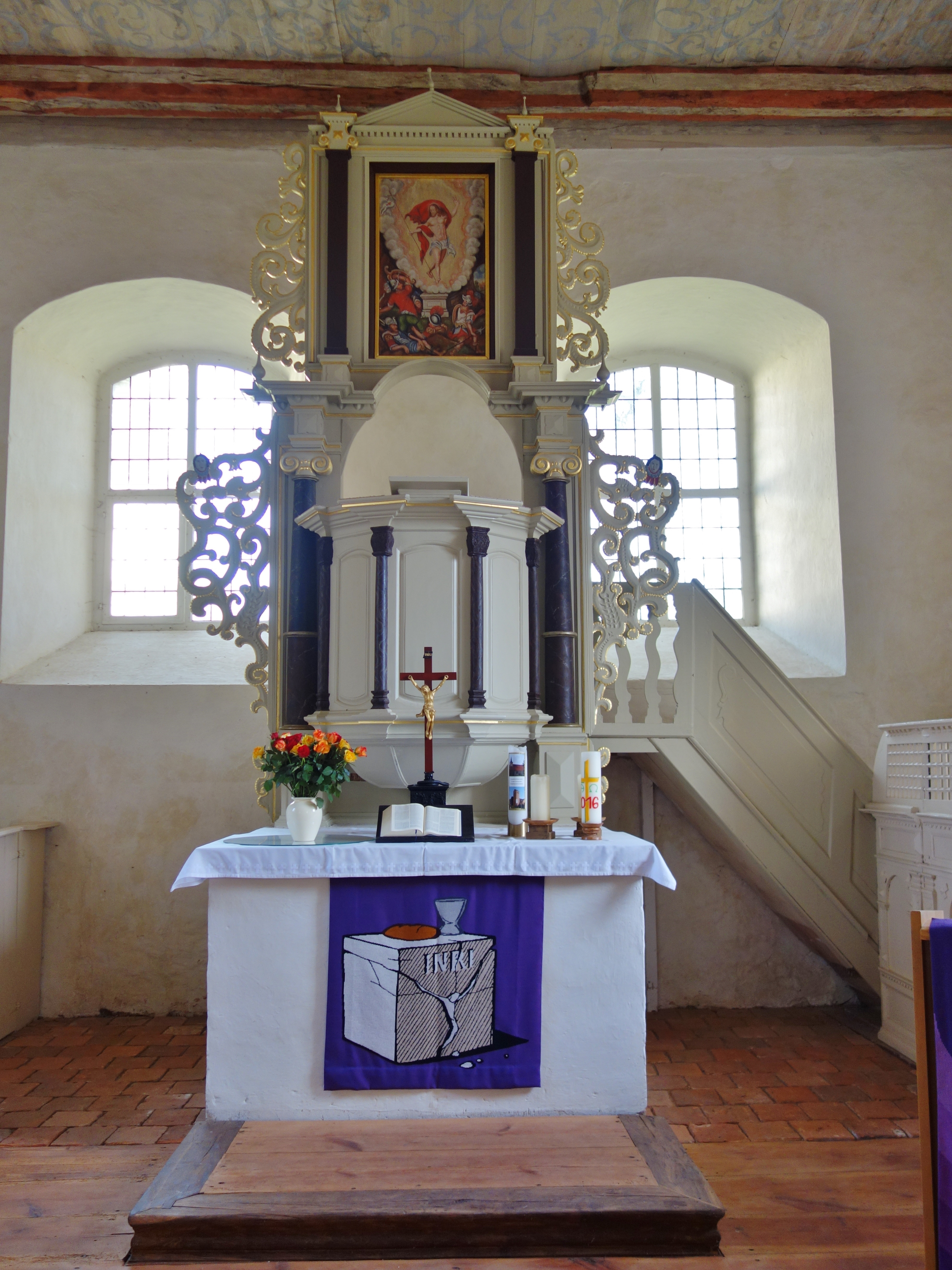
Dorf Church in Berlitt, Germany

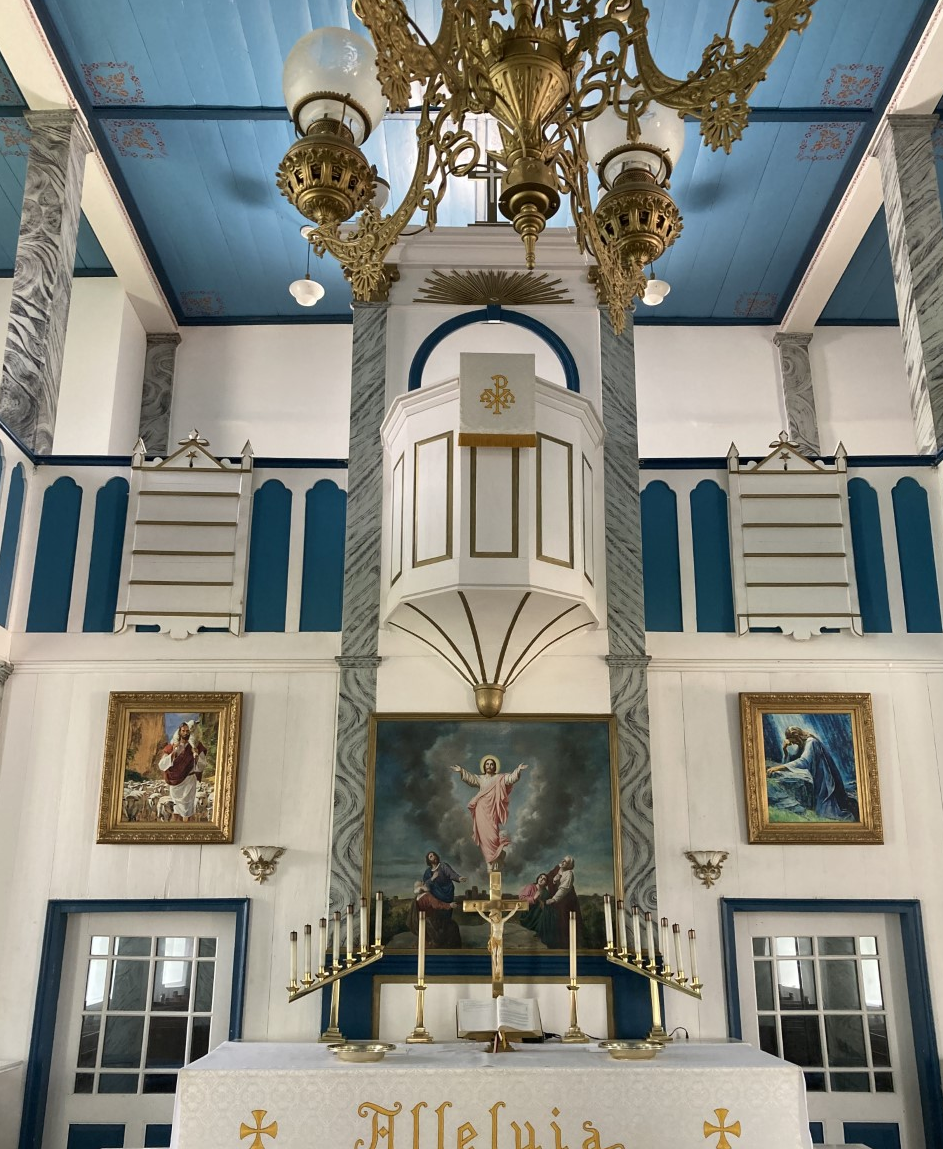
St. Paul's Lutheran Church, Serbin, Texas

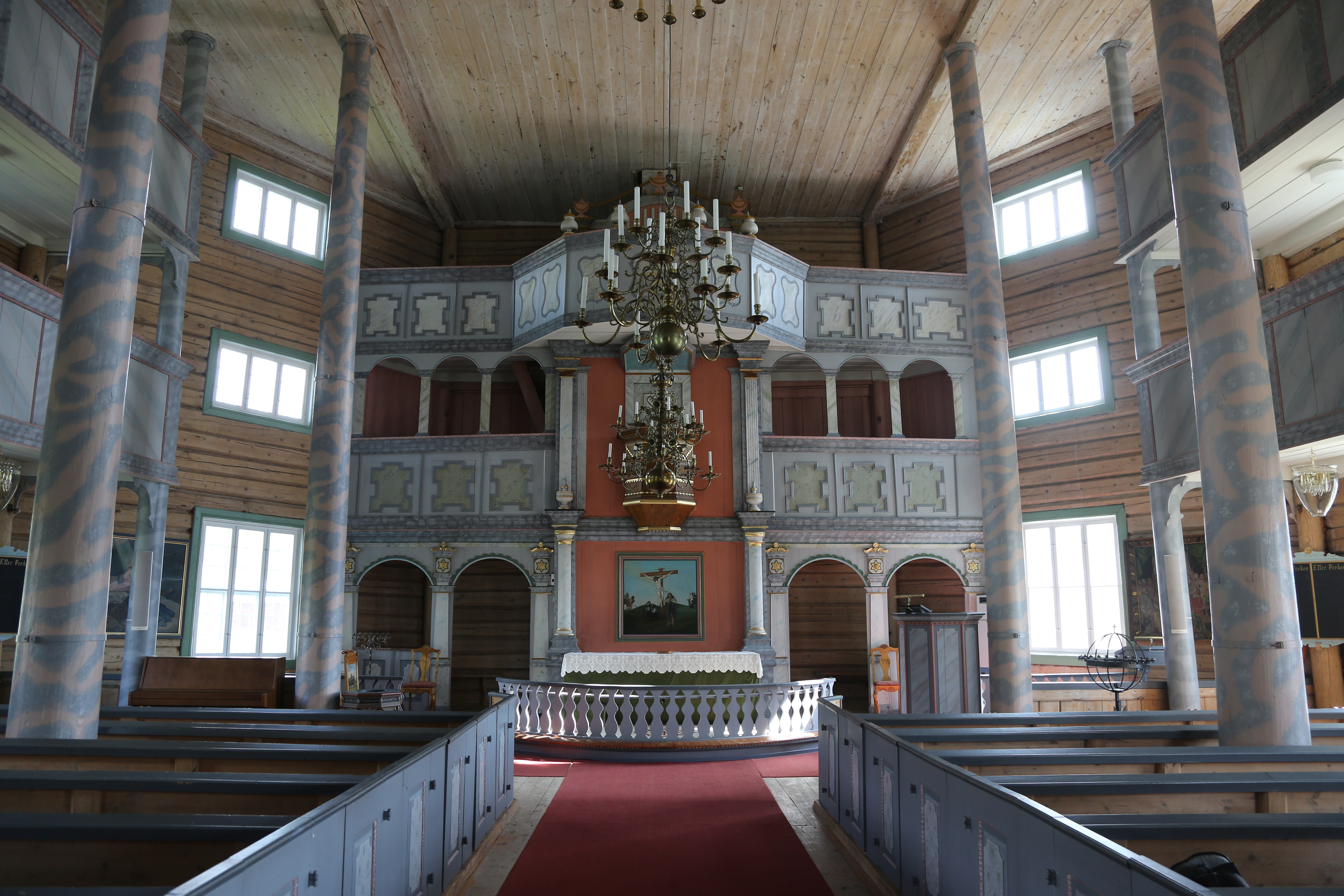
Tolga Church, Tolga, Norway

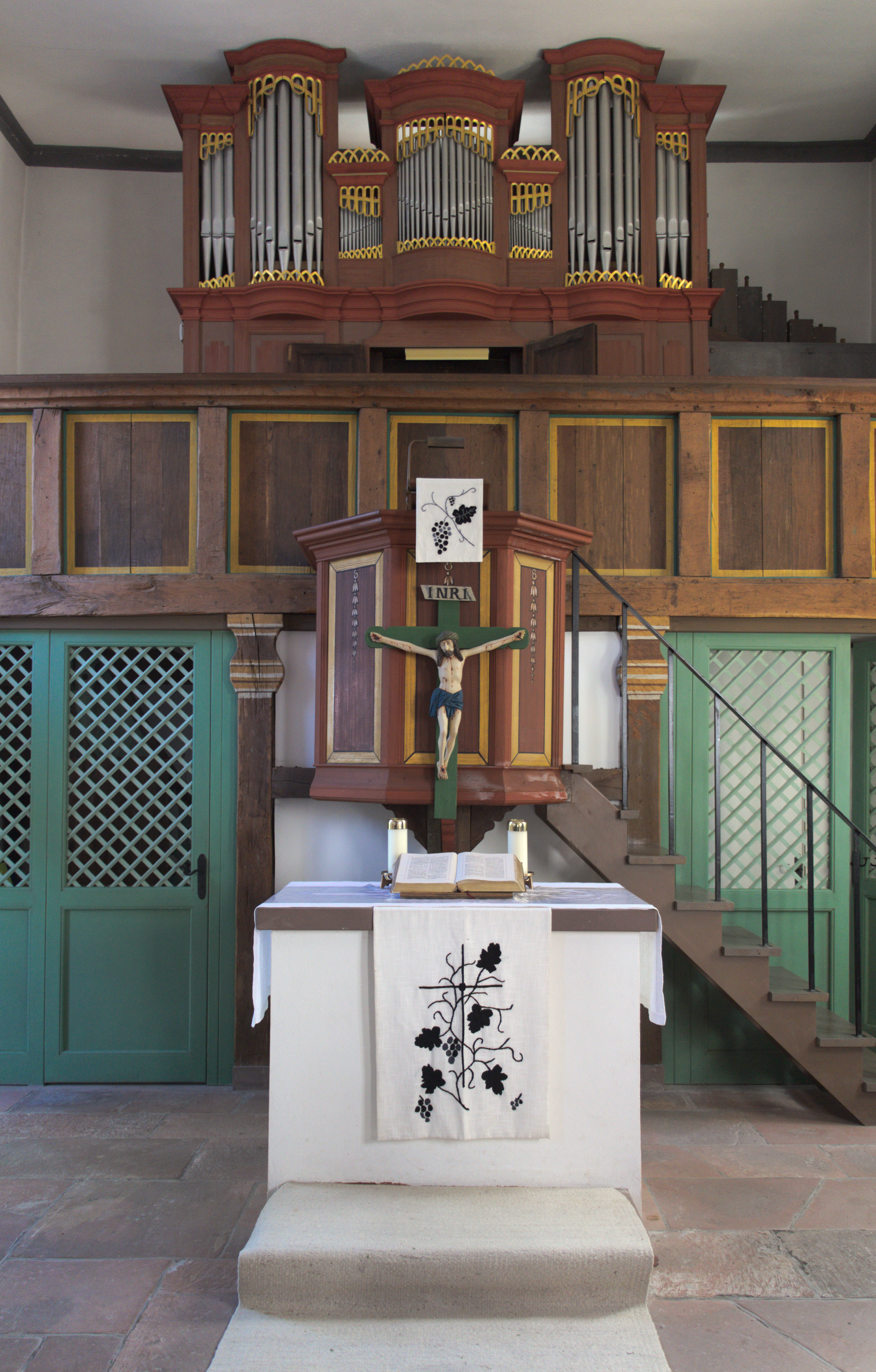
Pulpit-altar with organ in Bernshausen, Germany

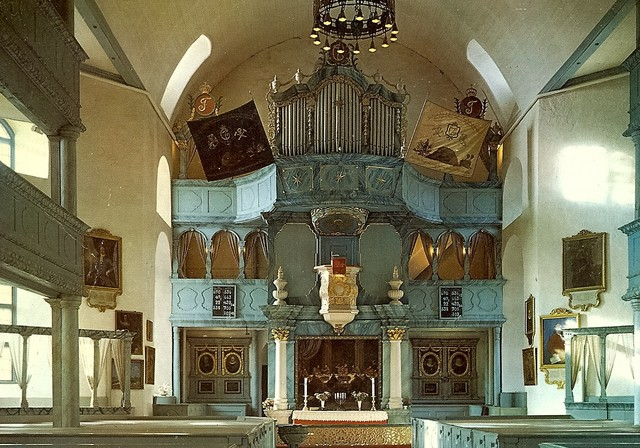
Røros Church, Røros, Norway

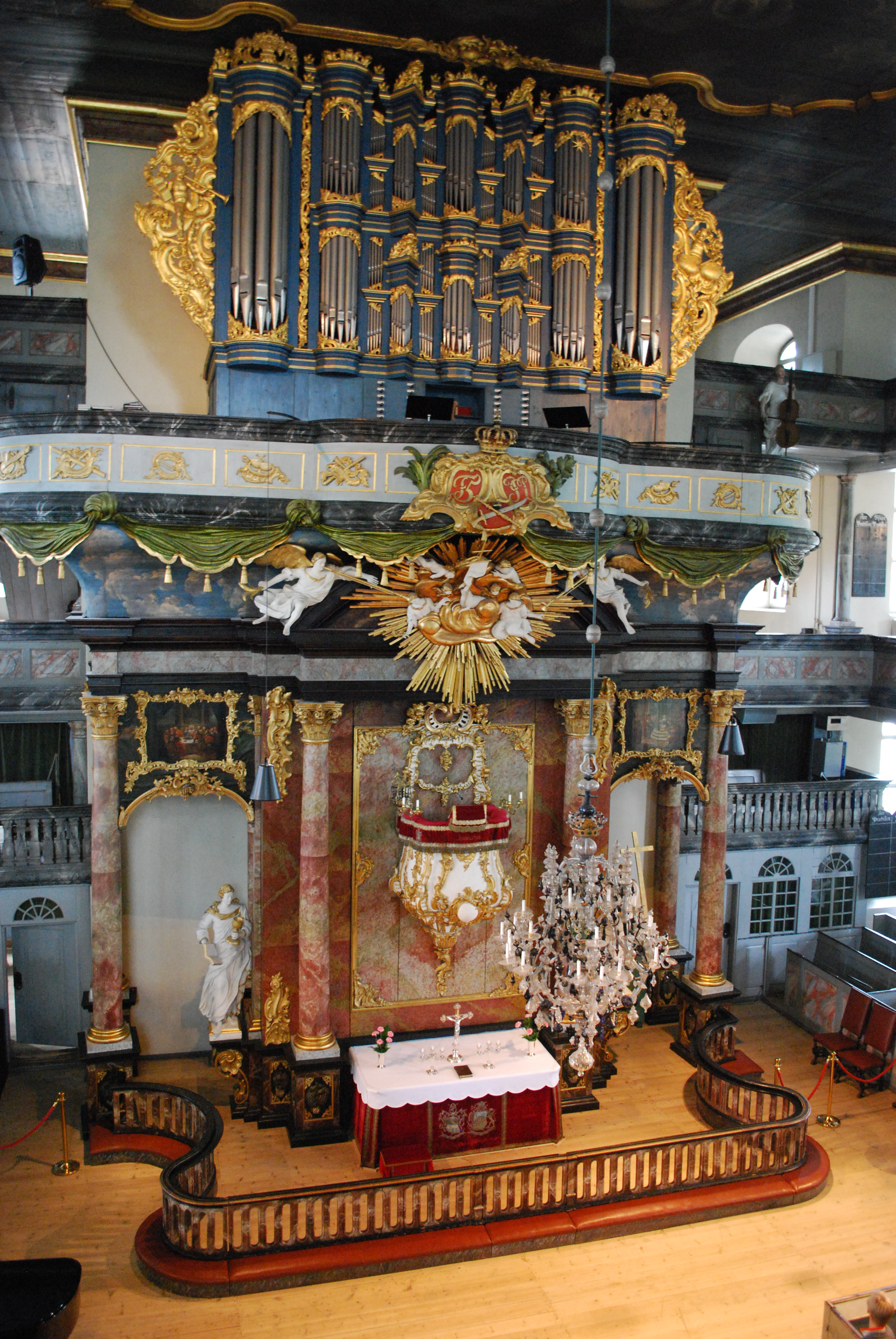
Kongsberg Church in Kongsberg Municipality, Norway

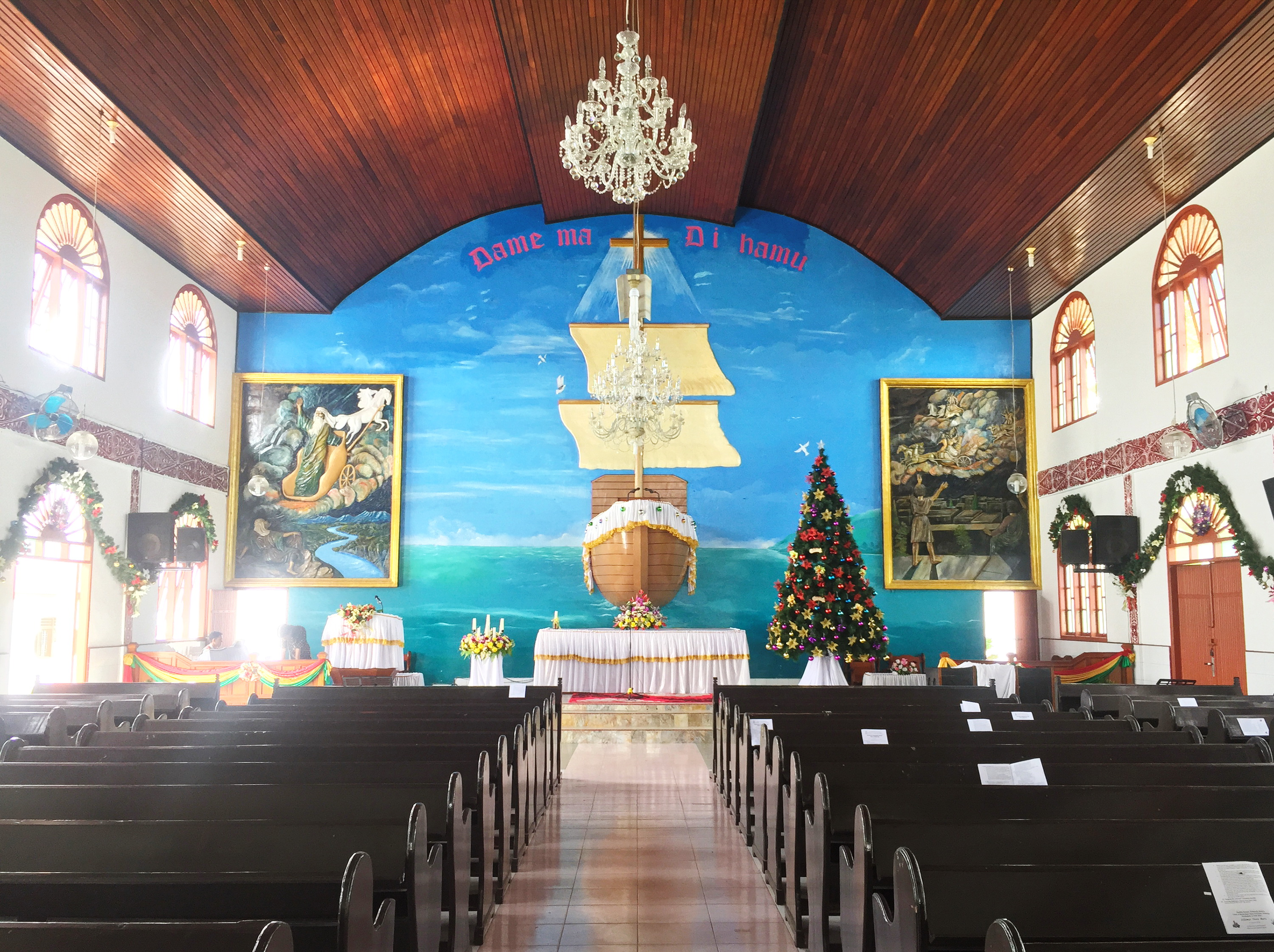
Batak Christian Protestant Church in North Sumatra, Indonesia

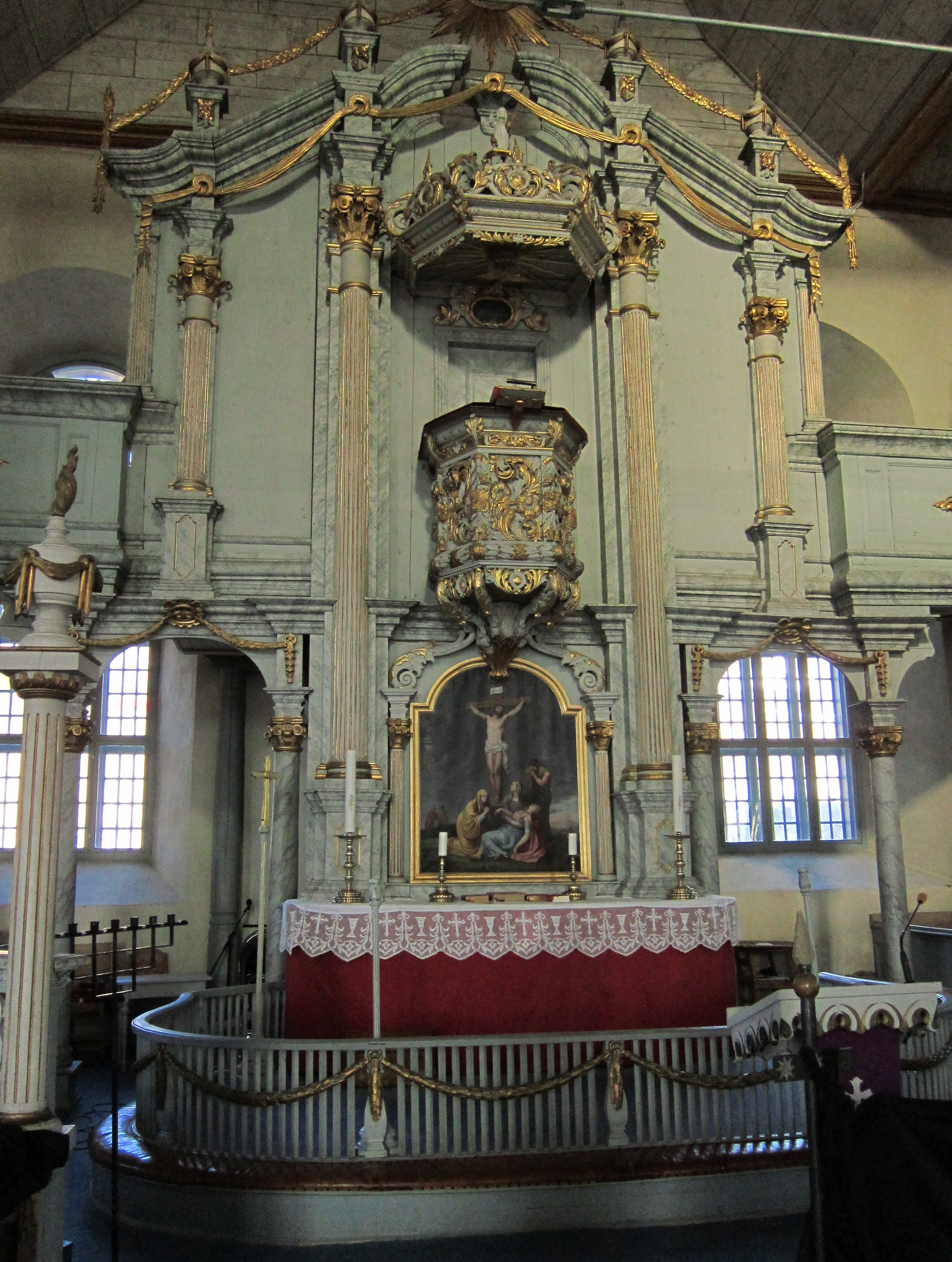
Sør-Fron Church in Norway

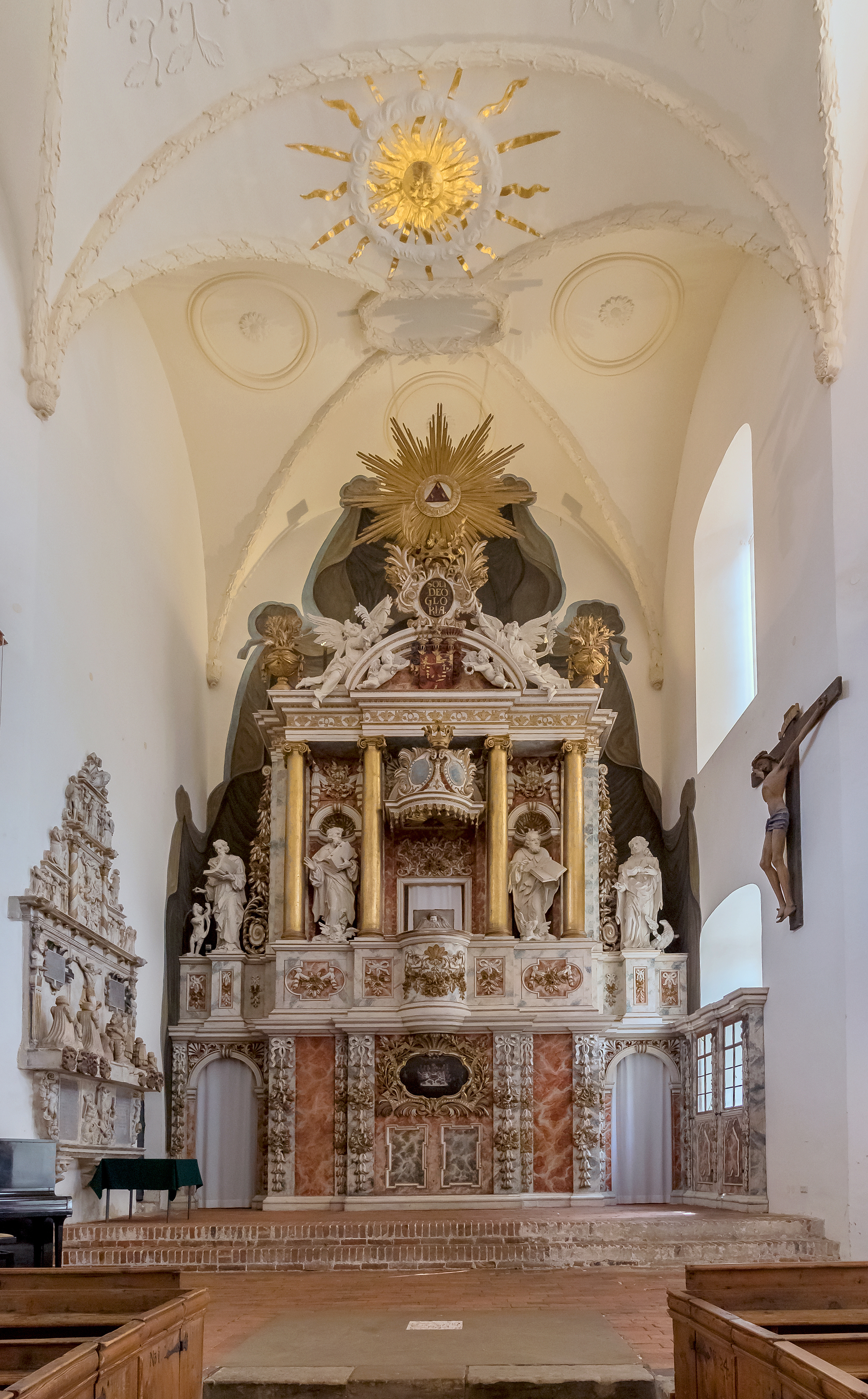
Pulpit altar, St. Blasii, Quedlinburg
