= Elgspiggen =

Mountain in Innlandet, Norway

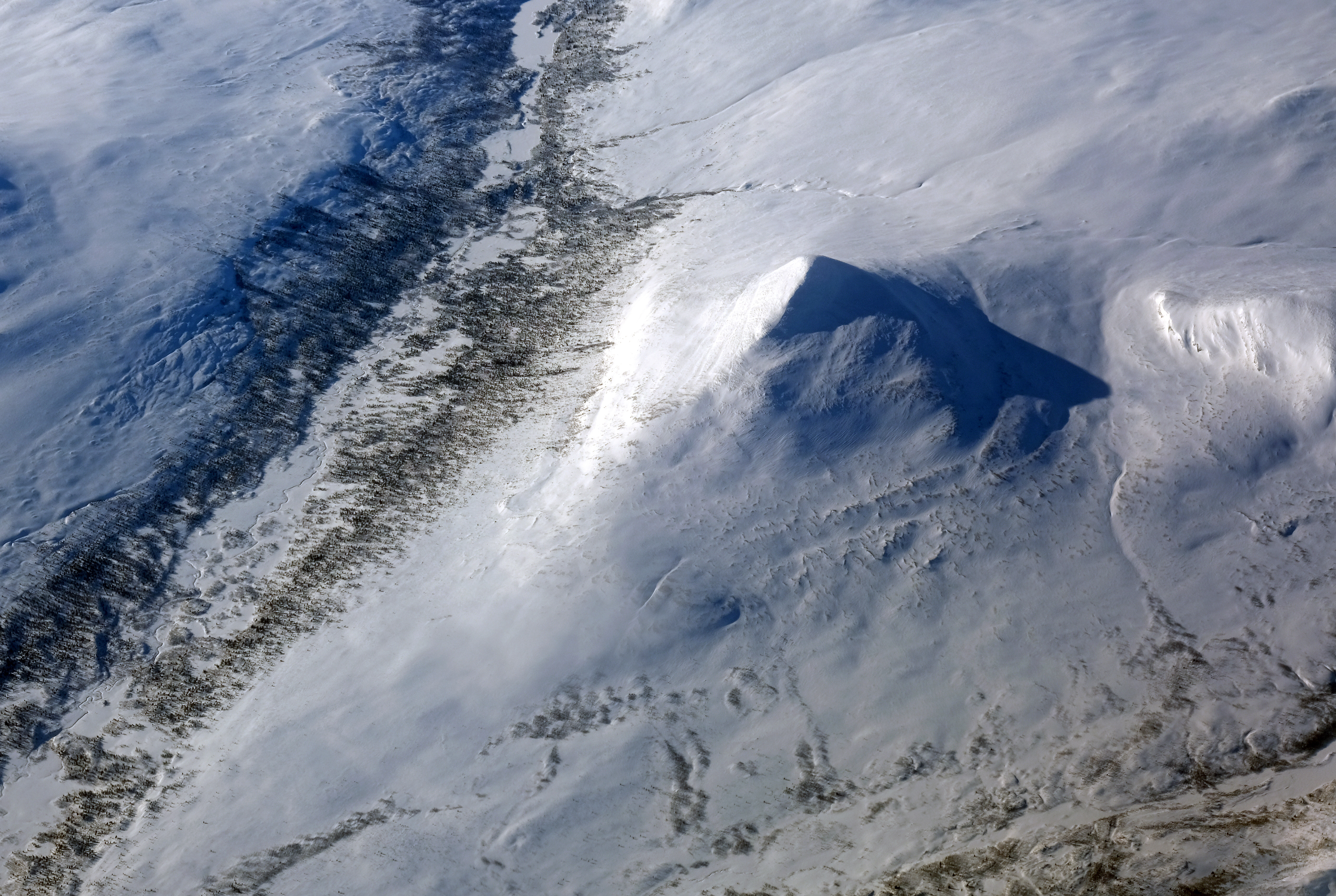

Highest point
- Elevation: 1,604 m (5,262 ft)
- Prominence: 766 m (2,513 ft)
- Parent peak: Midtre Sølen
- Isolation: 30.4 km (18.9 mi) to Sølen
- Coordinates: 62°09′34″N 11°21′30″E

Geography
- Interactive map of the mountain
- Location: Innlandet, Norway

Climbing
- Easiest route: Hiking

Elgspiggen is a mountain located on the border of Tolga Municipality and Rendalen Municipality in Innlandet county, Norway. It is part of the Holøydalen mountain area. The 1,604-metre (5,262 ft) mountain is easily recognizable due to its shape like a pyramid. The mountain has a topographic prominence of about 766 metres (2,513 ft) and a topographic isolation of about 30 kilometres (19 mi). It is the tallest peak in Tolga Municipality.

== Name ==
The mountain name, Elgspiggen, is literally translated to "Moose's Peak" since the Norwegian word elg means 'moose' and the word piggen means 'peak of a mountain'. In Norway, the moose is seen as the king of all animals inhabiting the Norwegian forests.

== Access ==
Access to Elgspiggen is possible all year around. In the summer weather, you can access the peak by taking a 6-kilometre (3.7 mi) hike from Orvdalen and heading to the west. You can also access the mountain by a 7-kilometre (4.3 mi) hike from Heggerådalen and heading south. In the winter, cross-country skiing is the only possible way to reach the mountain. Its steep pyramid shape makes Elgspiggen popular for off-piste skiing. From the top, you can view other great peaks. In the west you will spot Snøhetta and Rondane while in the south you are able to see Rendalssølen with its three peaks.

== See also ==
- List of mountains of Norway
