= Hodalen =

Village in Tolga Municipality, Norway

- Village
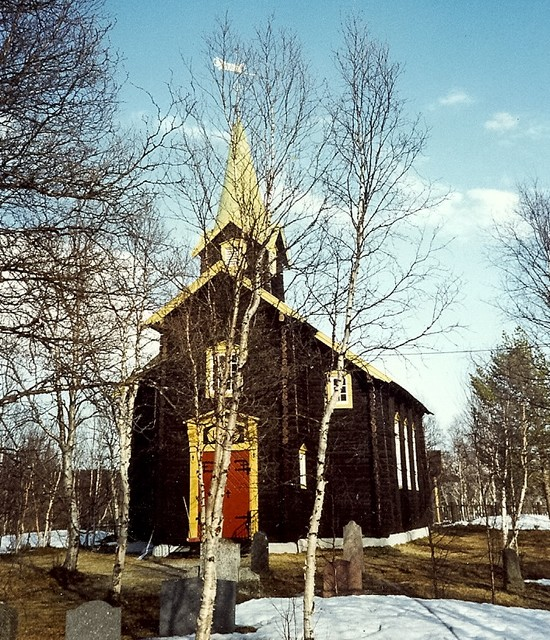
- View of the village church
- Interactive map of Hodalen
- Location within Innlandet Location within Norway
- Coordinates: 62.36211°N 11.19708°E
- Country: Norway
- Region: Eastern Norway
- County: Innlandet
- District: Østerdalen
- Municipality: Tolga Municipality
- Elevation: 786 m (2,579 ft)
- Time zone: UTC+01:00 (CET)
  - Summer (DST): UTC+02:00 (CEST)
- Post Code: 2540 Tolga

Hodalen is a village in Tolga Municipality in Innlandet county, Norway. The village is located about 14 kilometres (8.7 mi) southeast of the village of Tolga, along County Road 26 which runs between Tolga and the village of Drevsjø. Hodalen Church has been located in the village since 1936.

The mountain Håmmålsfjellet lies just to the north of the village, and south of the valley lies the Raudsjøheimen mountain range. The Hola river begins at lake Nordersjøen on the south side of the village. The river runs to the southeast through several small lakes near the village including: Drengen, Asmaren, Stikkilen, and Storsjøen before the river heads to the southeast.

In the 18th century, there were trials between the local villagers and farmers from the parish of Tynset concerning fishing rights in the local lakes.
