= Sølen =

Mountain in Innlandet, Norway

- Rendalssølen or Søln (unofficial)
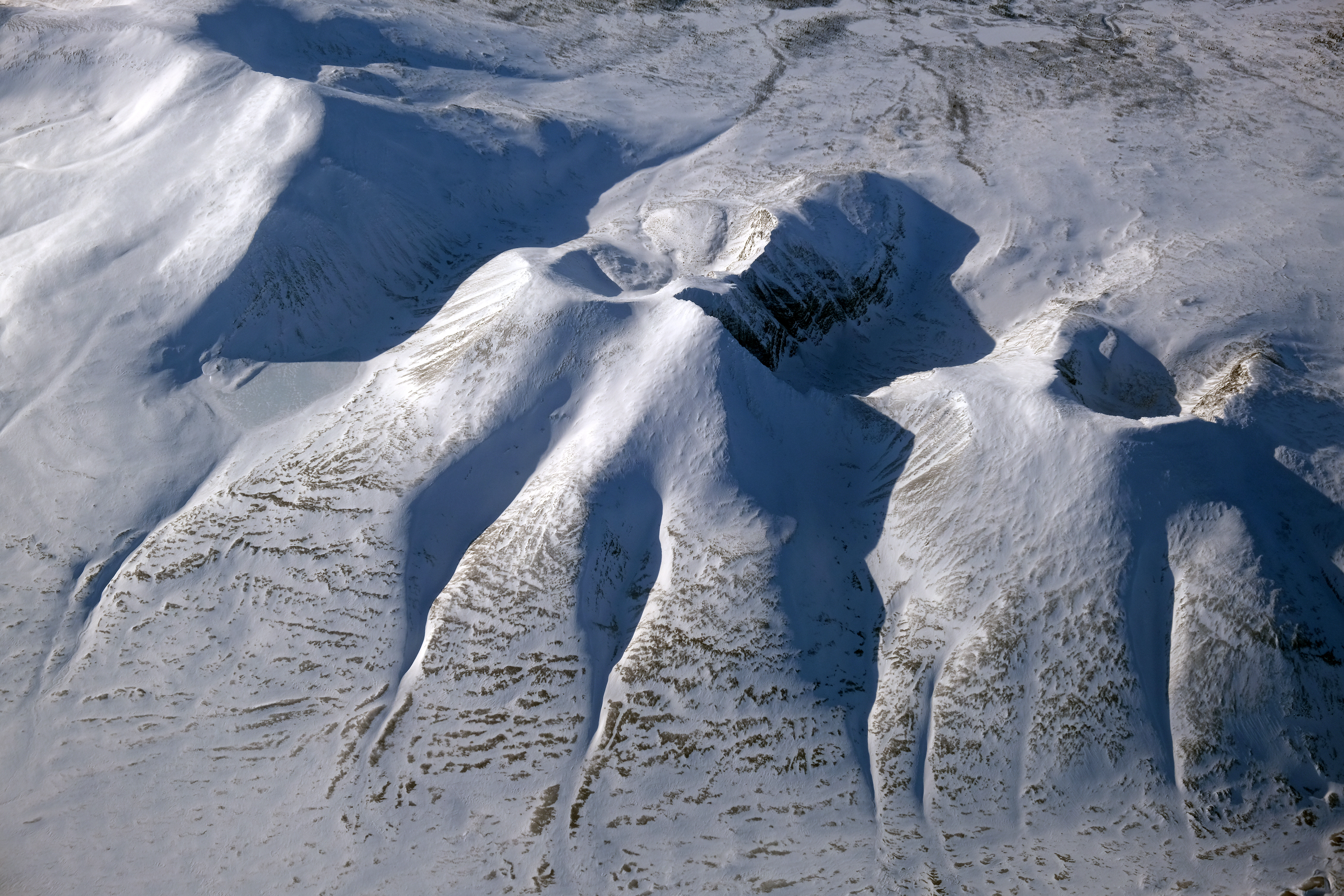
- Aerial view of the mountain

Highest point
- Elevation: 1,755 m (5,758 ft)
- Prominence: 1,090 m (3,580 ft)
- Isolation: 64.9 km (40.3 mi)
- Coordinates: 61°53′03″N 11°31′02″E

Geography
- Interactive map of the mountain
- Location: Innlandet, Norway
- Topo map(s): N1918 I Otnes and N2018 IV Isteren

Sølen (or unofficially: Rendalssølen or Søln) is a mountain in Rendalen Municipality in Innlandet county, Norway. The mountain lies about 25 kilometres (16 mi) east of the village of Bergset. The lake Sølensjøen lies just east of the mountain. The mountain has three peaks:

- Nordre Sølen, which has an elevation of 1,695 metres (5,561 ft) with a prominence of 253 metres (830 ft)
- Midtre Sølen, which has an elevation of 1,755 metres (5,758 ft) with a prominence of 1,090 metres (3,580 ft)
- Søre Sølen, which has an elevation of 1,688 metres (5,538 ft) with a prominence of 441 metres (1,447 ft)

The three peaks and their saddles make the mountain distinct and visible from a long distance.

An old pilgrimage route from Sweden via Trysil to Nidaros Cathedral passes through the southern gorge. The Sølen landscape conservation area was established in 2011 and it includes both the mountain massif and parts of the neighboring lake Sølensjøen.

== Name ==
The name is maybe derived from the Old Norse word sǫlr which means 'sallow' or 'wan' referring to its color. It could also be derived from the word meaning saddle (Old Norse: sǫðull).

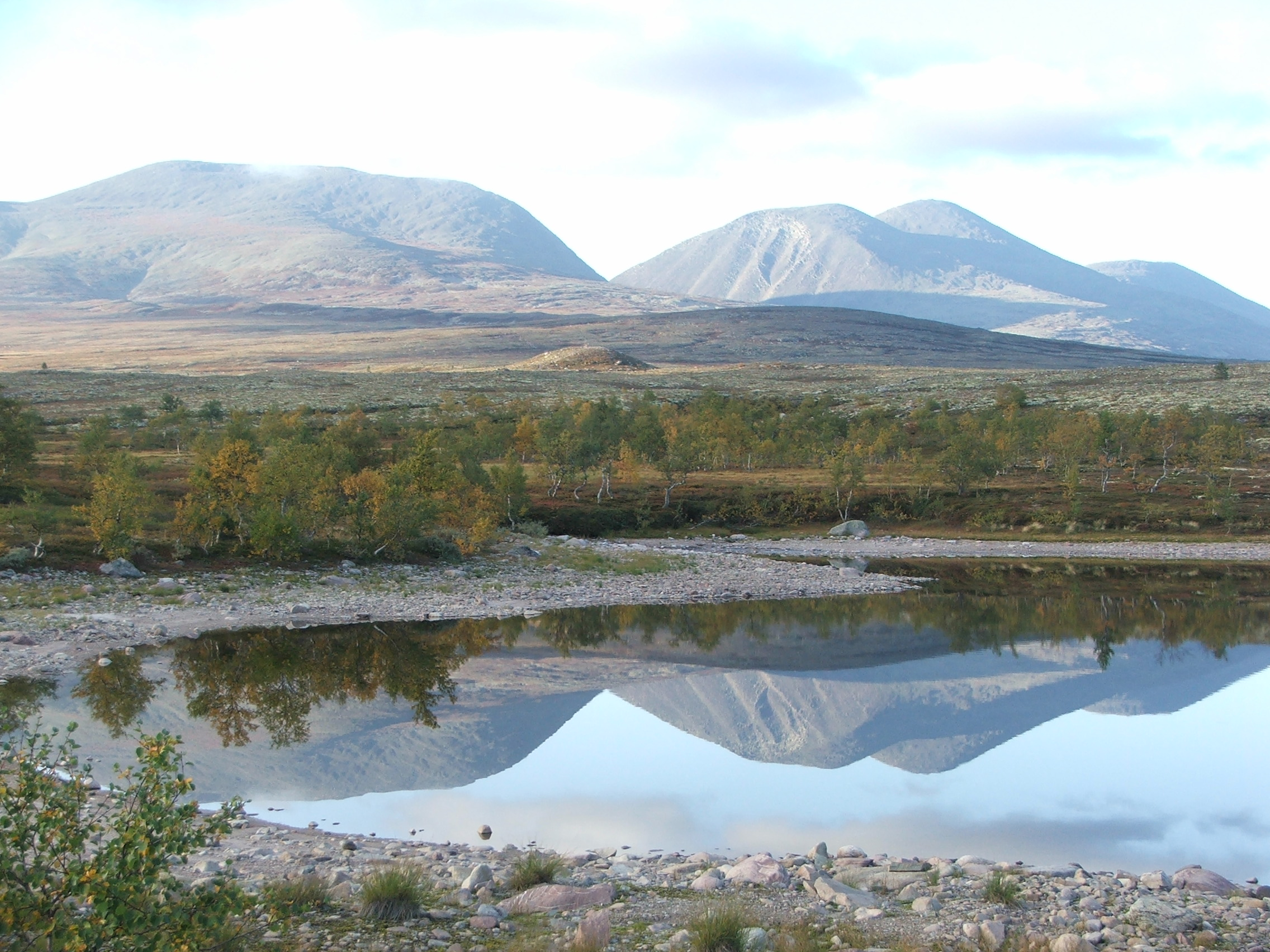
Seen from the east, by Sandtjønn

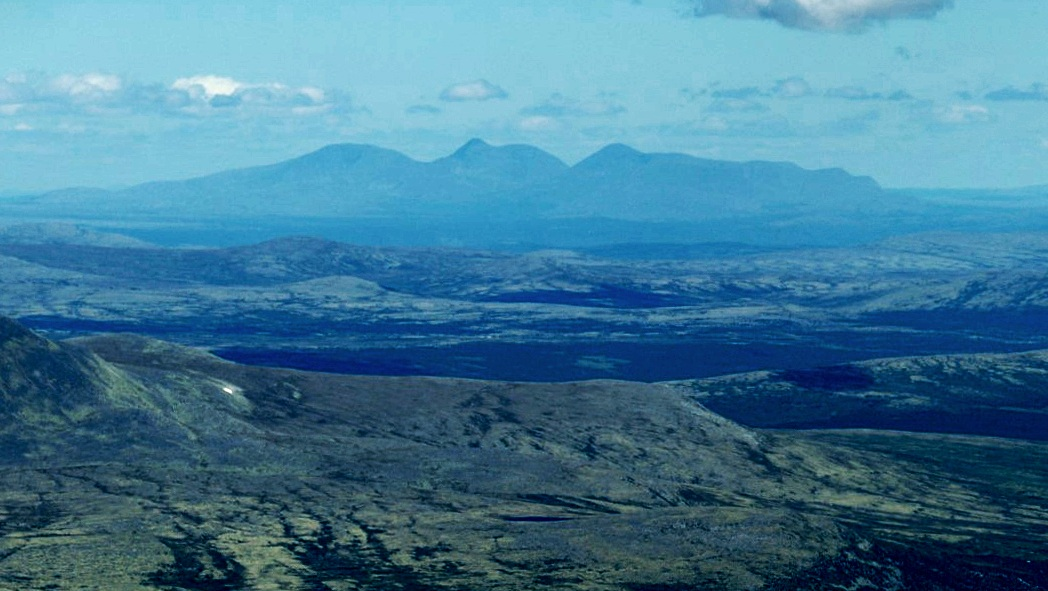
Nordre, Midtre and Søre Sølen seen from Rondeslottet (west)

== See also ==
- List of mountains of Norway
