= Tolga Church =

Church in Innlandet, Norway

- Tolga kirke
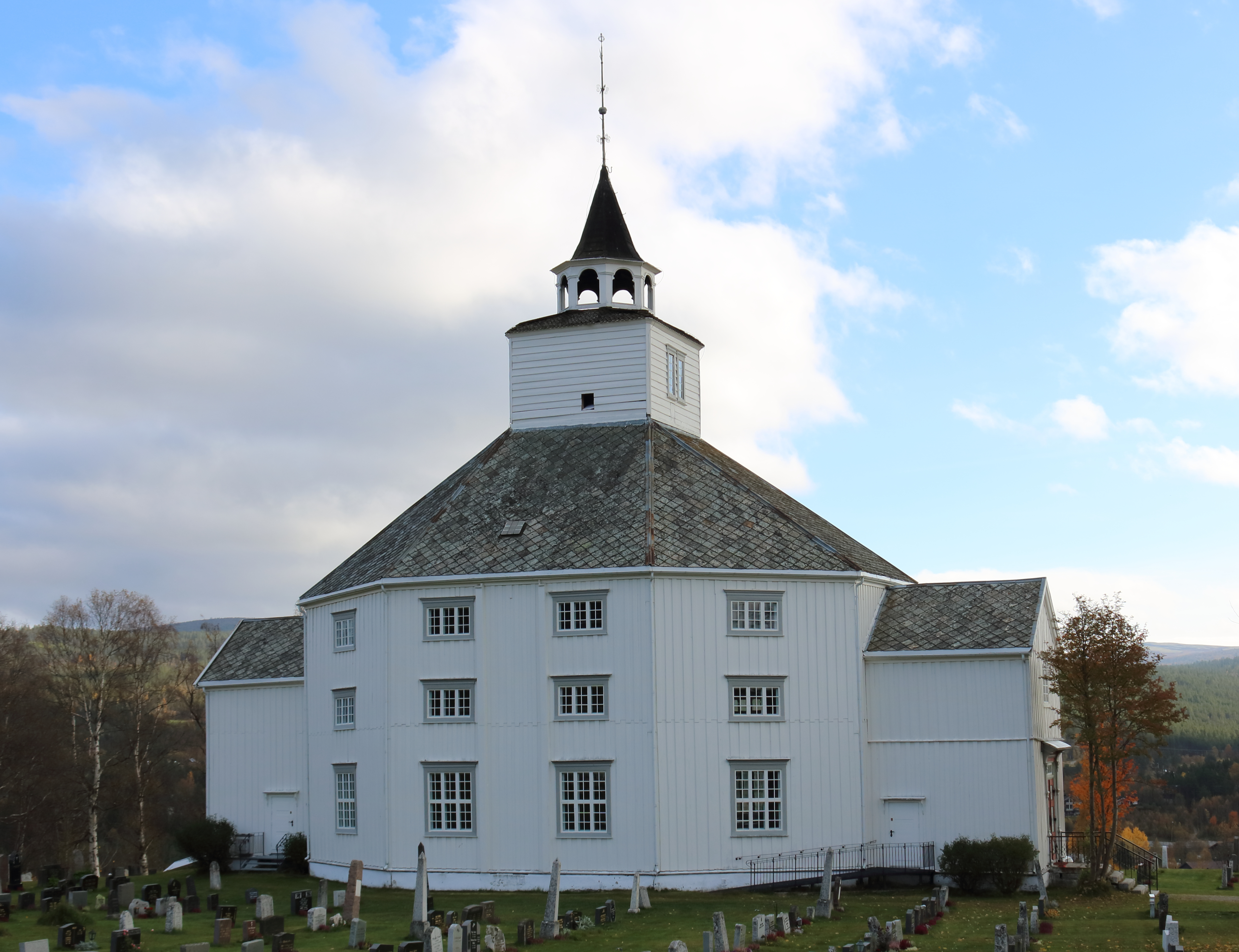
- View of the church
- Tolga Church
- 62°24′54″N 10°59′39″E
- Location: Tolga Municipality, Innlandet
- Country: Norway
- Denomination: Church of Norway
- Churchmanship: Evangelical Lutheran

History
- Status: Parish church
- Founded: 1688
- Consecrated: 15 November 1840

Architecture
- Functional status: Active
- Architect: R.S. Aspaas
- Architectural type: Octagonal
- Completed: 1840 (186 years ago)

Specifications
- Capacity: 300
- Materials: Wood

Administration
- Diocese: Hamar bispedømme
- Deanery: Nord-Østerdal prosti
- Parish: Tolga
- Norwegian Cultural Heritage Site
- Type: Church
- Status: Automatically protected
- ID: 85642

Tolga Church (Norwegian: Tolga kirke) is a parish church of the Church of Norway in Tolga Municipality in Innlandet county, Norway. It is located in the village of Tolga. It is the church for the Tolga parish which is part of the Nord-Østerdal prosti (deanery) in the Diocese of Hamar. The white, wooden church was built in an octagonal design in 1840 using plans drawn up by the architect Rasmus Svendsen Aspaas. The church seats about 300 people.

== History ==
During the 1660s, a copper smelting building was built in the village of Tolga. The village grew up quickly around this smelter. In 1688, a church was built in the village. Prior to the new church, people of Tolga had to travel to the nearby Vingelen Church. The new Tolga church was a wooden building that measured about 11.3 by 7.5 metres (37 ft × 25 ft). From 1703 to 1705, the building was improved by adding a tower, altarpiece, pulpit, and baptismal font. In 1712, a new sacristy was constructed.

In 1814, this church served as an election church (Norwegian: valgkirke). Together with more than 300 other parish churches across Norway, it was a polling station for elections to the 1814 Norwegian Constituent Assembly which wrote the Constitution of Norway. This was Norway's first national elections. Each church parish was a constituency that elected people called "electors" who later met together in each county to elect the representatives for the assembly that was to meet at Eidsvoll Manor later that year.

By the 1830s, the church had become too small for the congregation, so plans were made to build a new church on the same site. Rasmus Svendsen Aspaas was hired to design the new building and John Eriksen Berg was hired as the lead builder. The new wooden church had an octagonal design with a central tower above the nave. It has a second and third floor seating gallery, meaning the church could seat about 300 people. The church was consecrated on 15 November 1840. The church was the last church in Norway to be built with a pulpit altar (Norwegian: prekestolalter) which was a pulpit built above the altar as part of the altarpiece. There is also another pulpit on the ground level. This was a popular design in the 18th and 19th centuries, but it fell out of fashion around the year 1840. There was a major restoration of the church in 1962–1965, where the goal was to bring the church more back to its original character.

== Media gallery ==
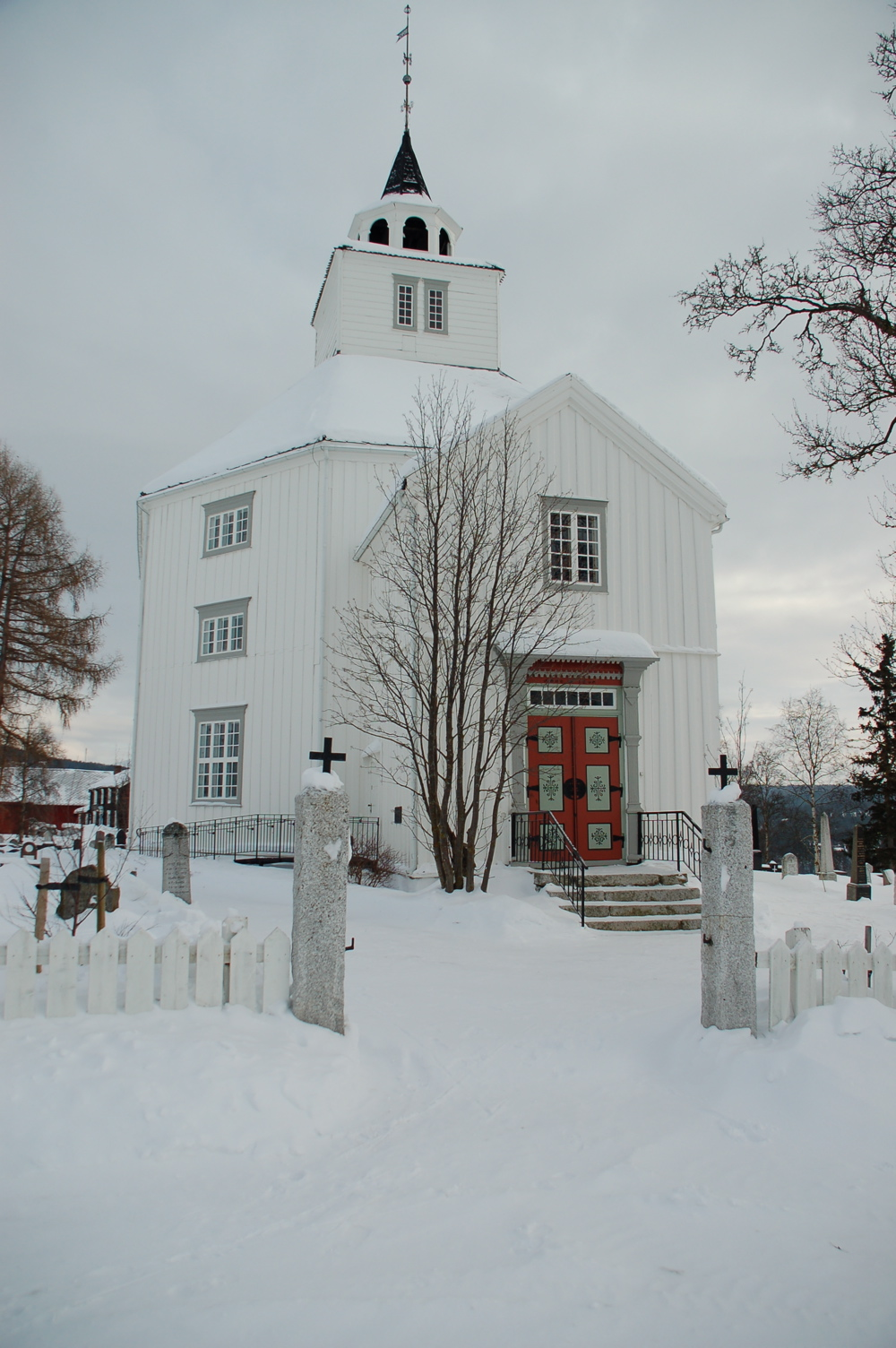

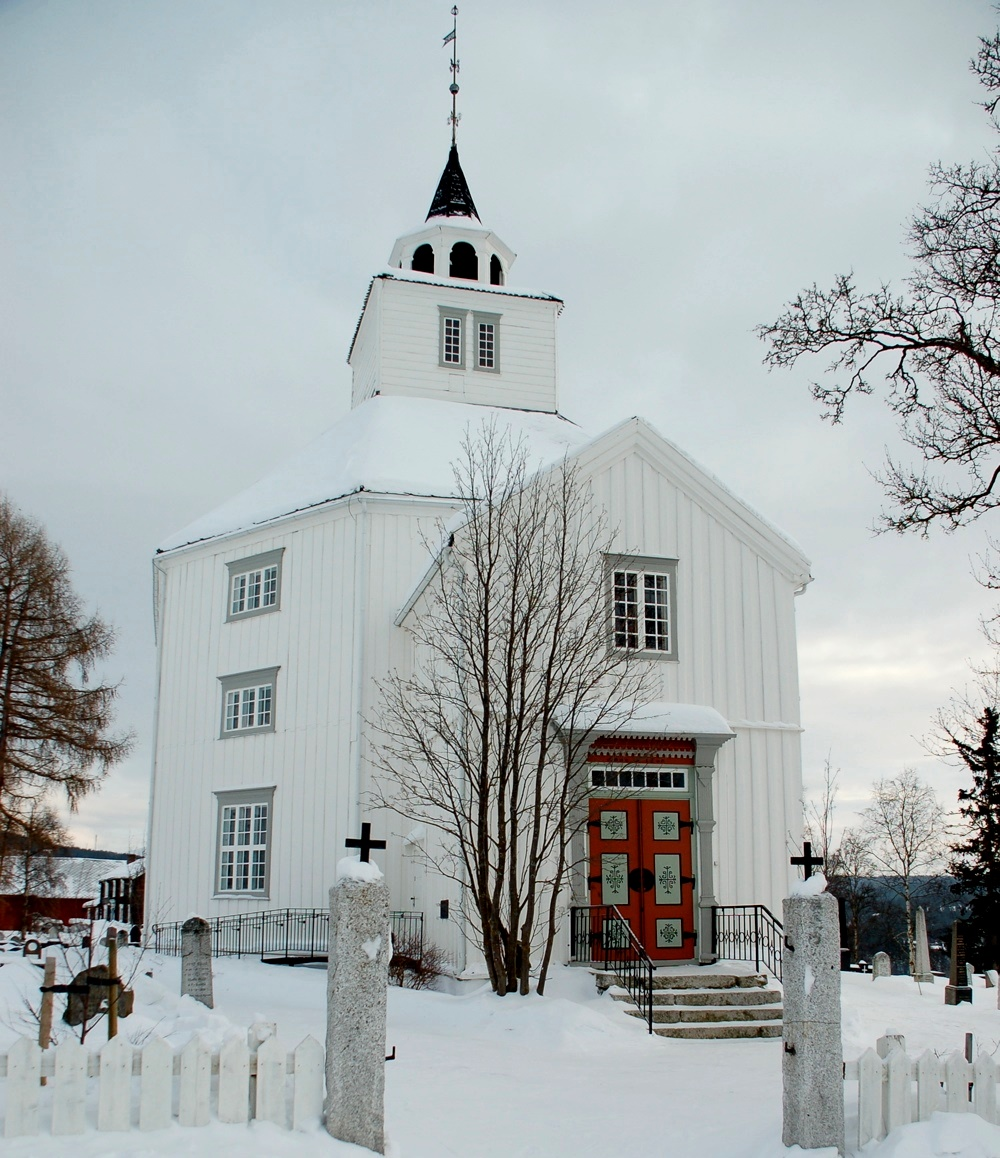

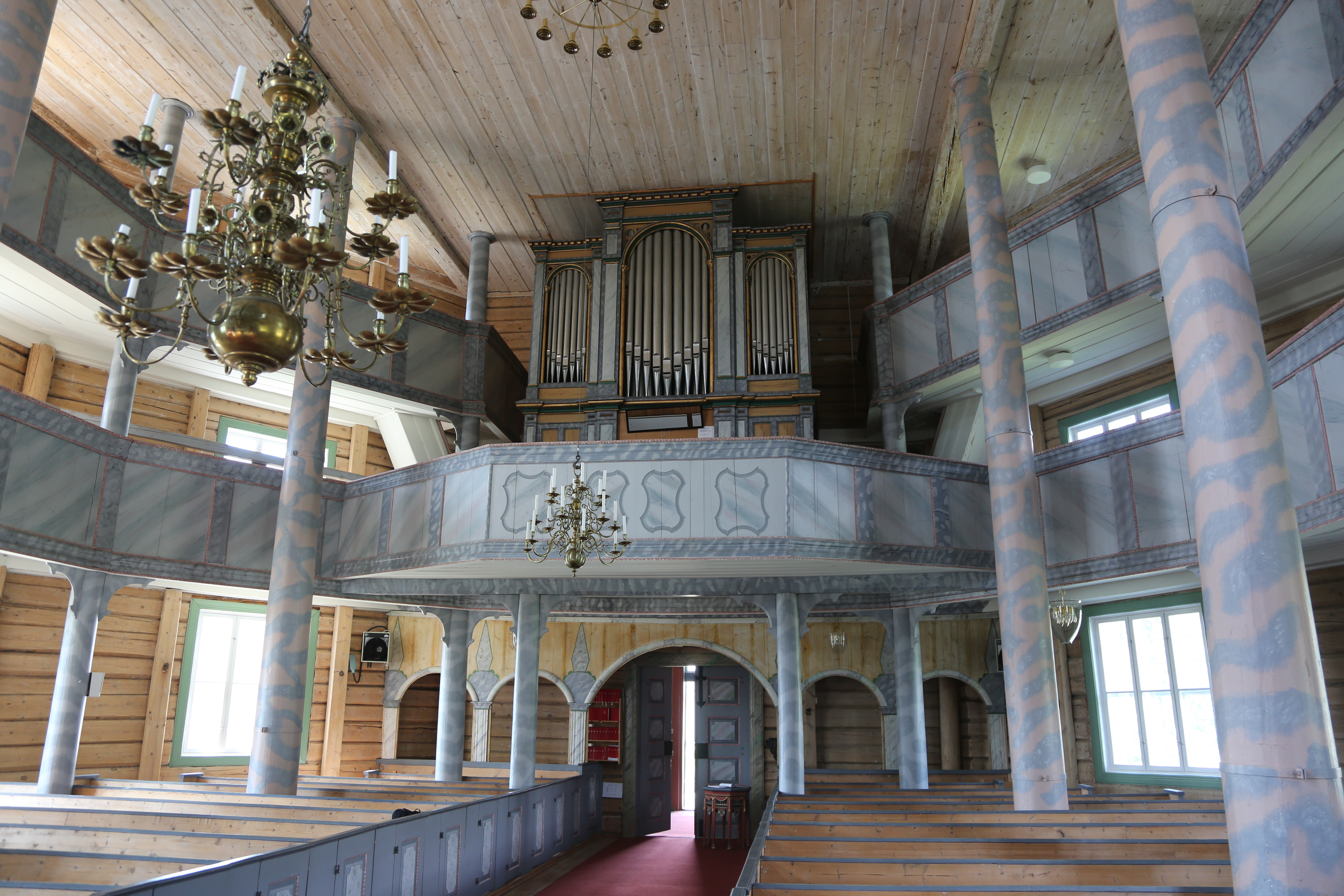

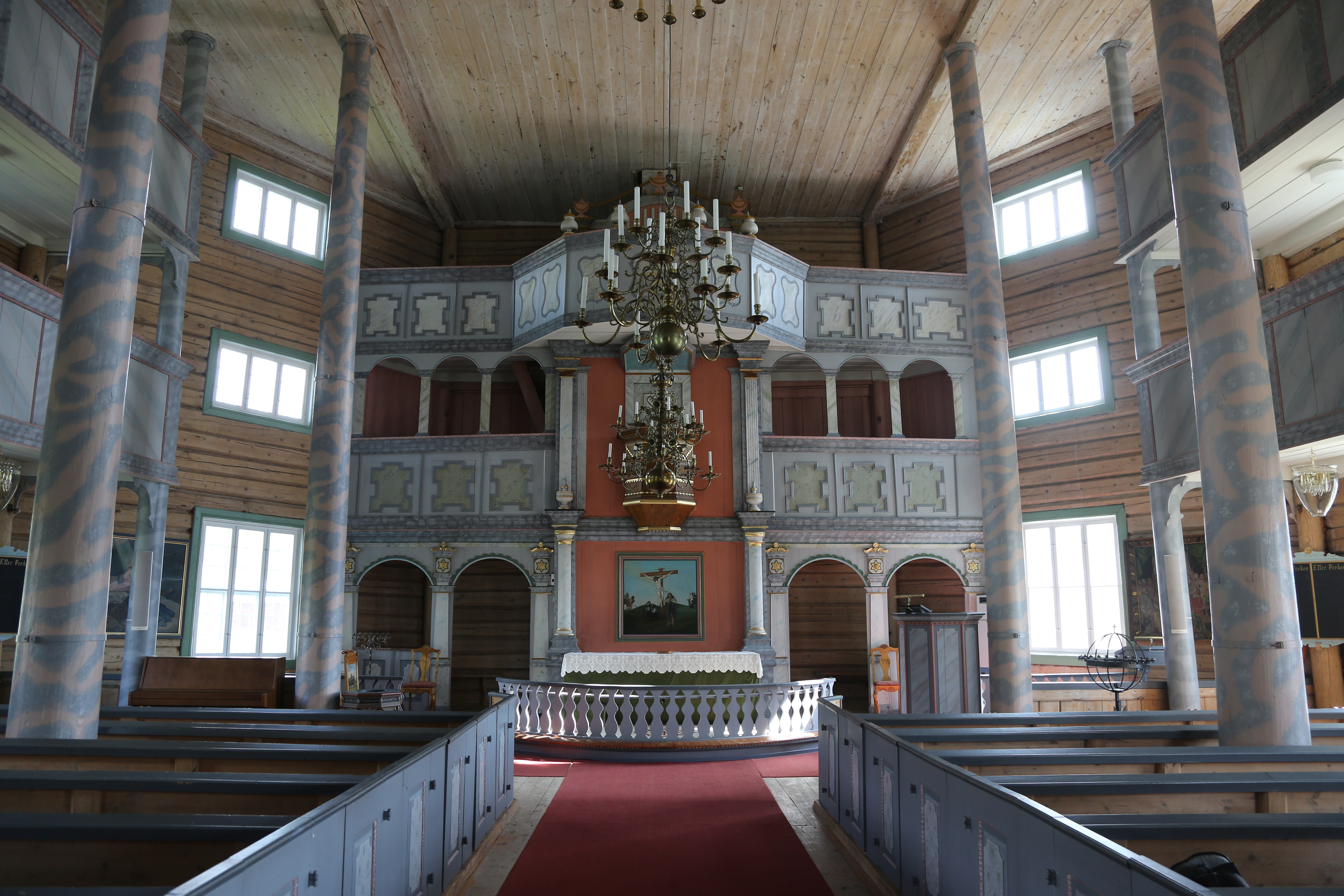

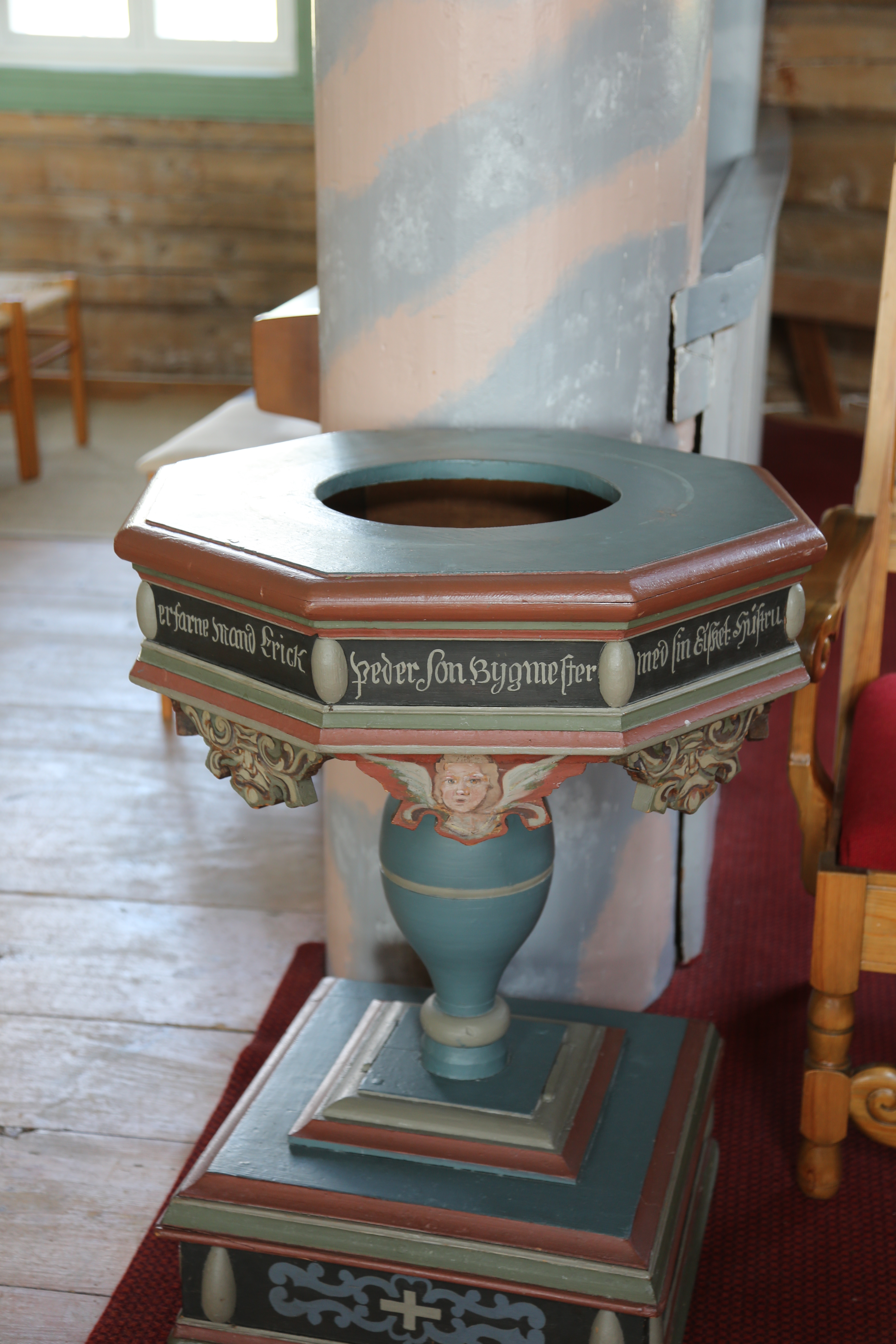

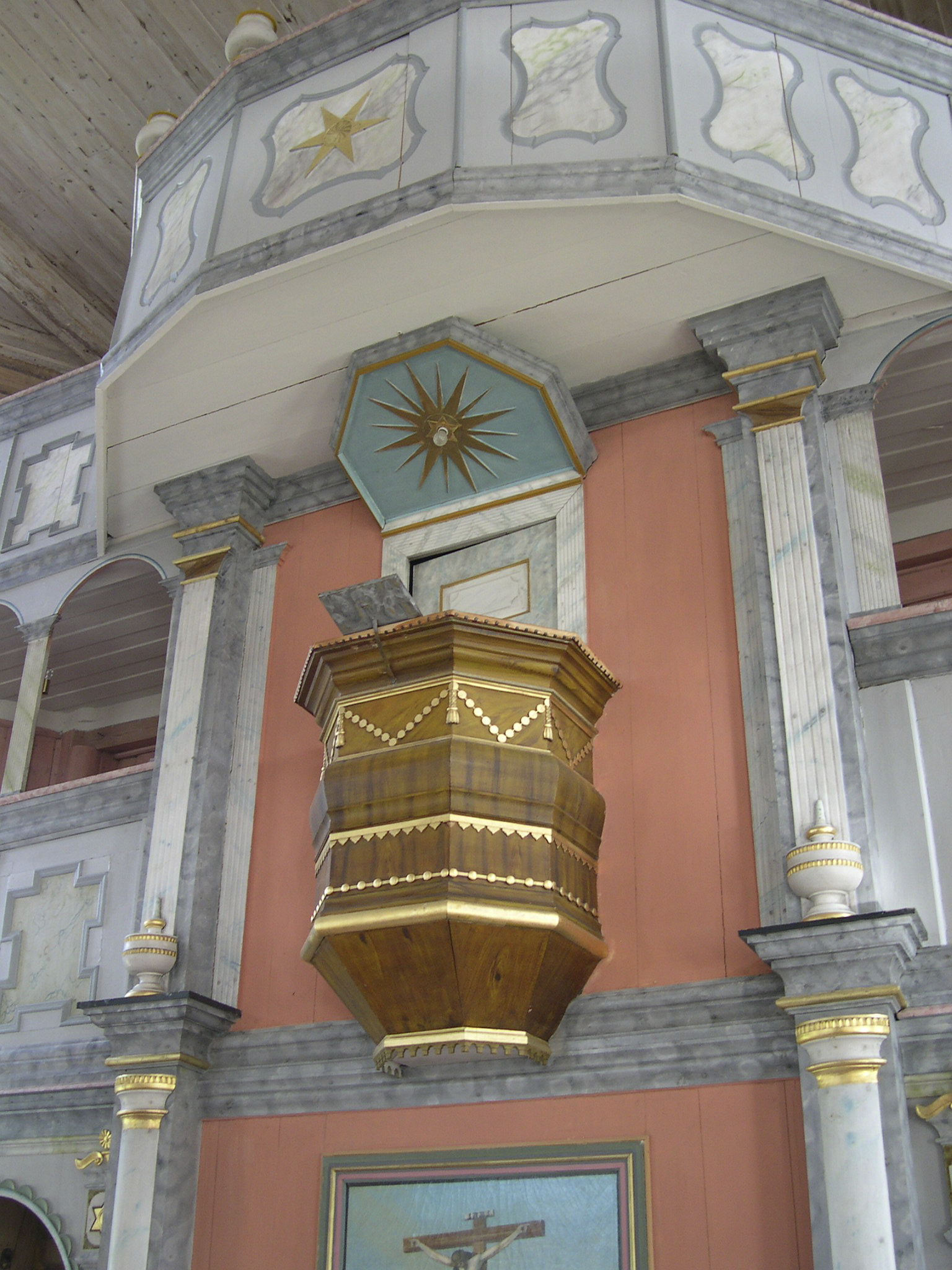

== See also ==
- List of churches in Hamar
