= Axel Smith =

Axel or Axl Smith may refer to:

- Axel Smith (topographer) (1744–1823), Norwegian priest and topographer
- Axel Smith (chess player) (born 1986), Swedish chess player
- Axel Christian Rosenkrantz Smith (1856–1935), Norwegian parliamentary representative, shipowner, bank manager and mayor
- Axl Smith (born 1984), Finnish former television presenter
