= Osensjøen =

Lake in Innlandet, Norway

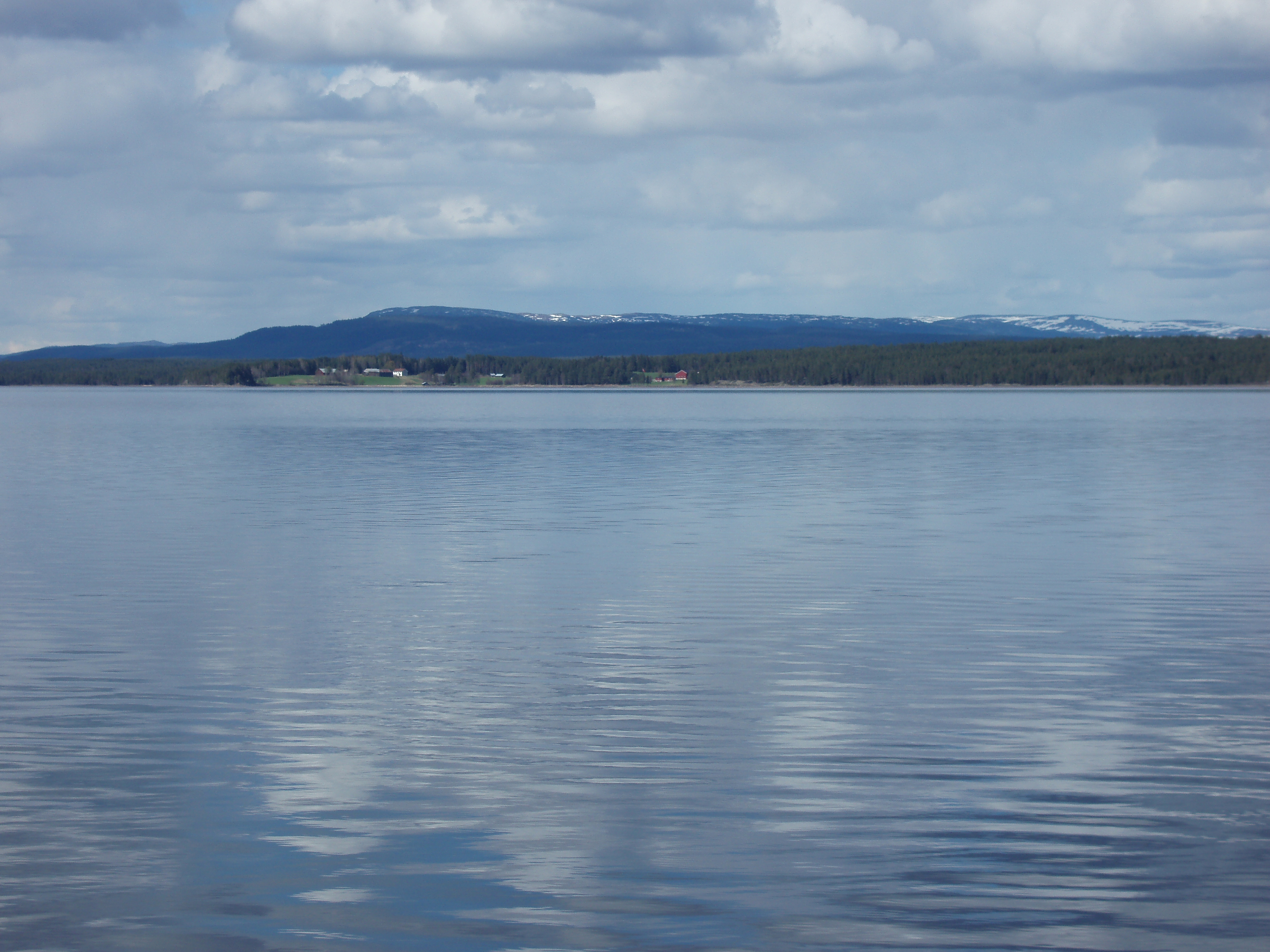
- Interactive map of the lake
- Location: Innlandet, Norway
- Coordinates: 61°15′10″N 11°50′45″E
- Basin countries: Norway
- Max. length: 26 kilometres (16 mi)
- Max. width: 2.6 kilometres (1.6 mi)
- Surface area: 43.64 km^{2} (16.85 sq mi)
- Average depth: 37 metres (121 ft)
- Max. depth: 117 metres (384 ft)
- Water volume: 1.61 km^{3} (0.39 cu mi)
- Shore length^{1}: 76.41 kilometres (47.48 mi)
- Surface elevation: 438 metres (1,437 ft)
- References: NVE
- ^{1} Shore length is not a well-defined measure.

Osensjøen is a lake in Innlandet County, Norway. The 43.6-square-kilometre (16.8 sq mi) lake is located in Åmot Municipality and Trysil Municipality. It has its outlet through the Søre Osa river which connects to the Renaelva river which continues on to the large river Glomma. The village of Osneset lies at the north end of the lake. Nordre Osen Church and the Old Nordre Osen Church both lie on the northern shore of the lake. The Søre Osen Church lies along the southeastern end of the lake.

== See also ==
- List of lakes in Norway
