= Trysil Municipality =

Municipality in Innlandet, Norway

Trysil Municipality Trysil kommune
- Municipality
- Tryssil herred (historic name)
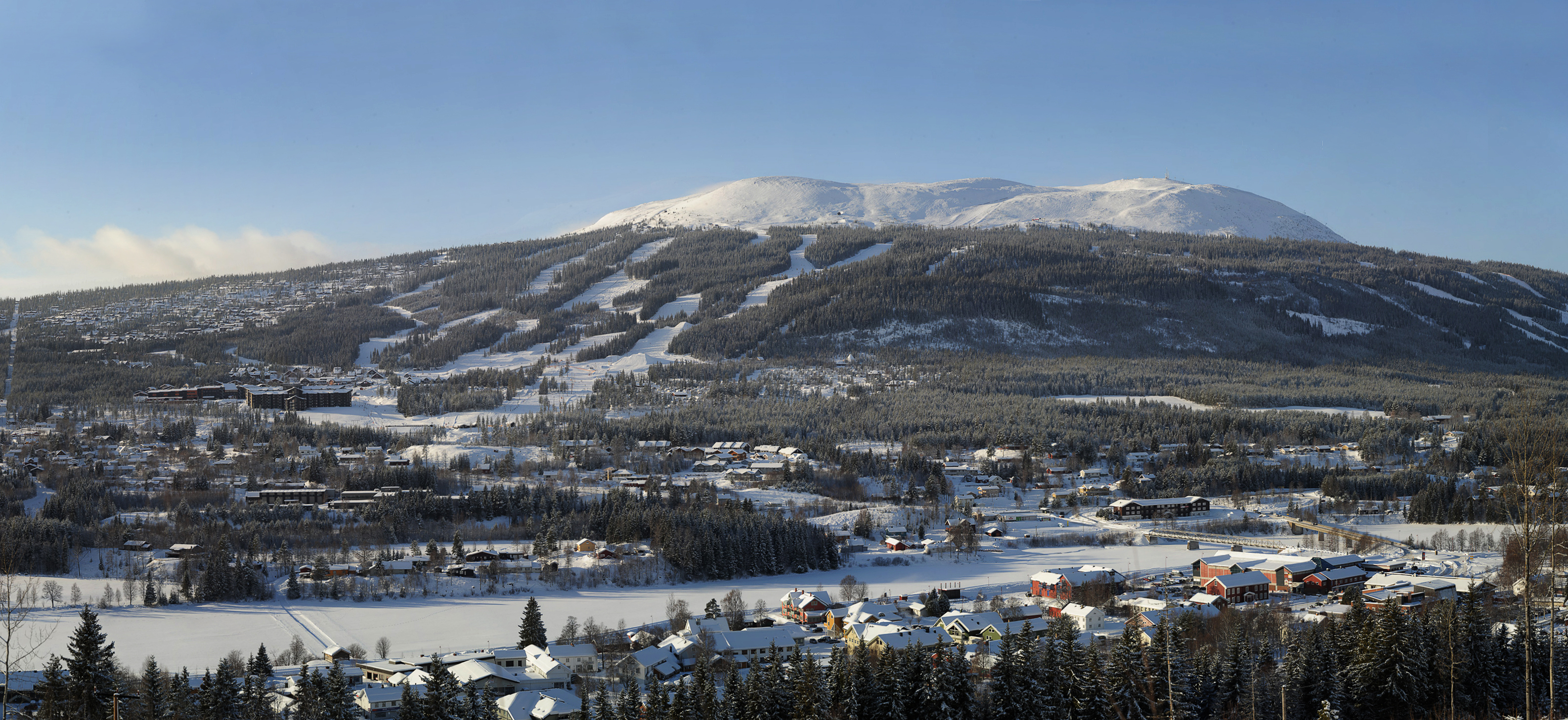
- View of Innbygda and a large skiing facility

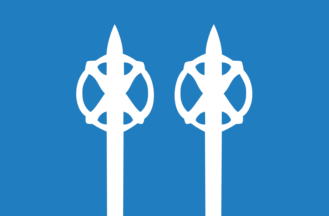
- Flag Coat of arms

- Innlandet within Norway

- Trysil within Innlandet
- Coordinates: 61°18′36″N 12°18′54″E
- Country: Norway
- County: Innlandet
- District: Østerdalen
- Established: 1 January 1838
  - Created as: Formannskapsdistrikt
- Administrative centre: Innbygda

Government
  - Mayor (2023): Turid Backe-Viken (Ap)

Area
  - Total: 3,014.40 km^{2} (1,163.87 sq mi)
  - Land: 2,940.76 km^{2} (1,135.43 sq mi)
  - Water: 73.63 km^{2} (28.43 sq mi) 2.4%
  - Rank: #15 in Norway
- Highest elevation: 1,209.09 m (3,966.8 ft)

Population (2025)
  - Total: 6,542
  - Rank: #152 in Norway
  - Density: 2.2/km^{2} (5.7/sq mi)
  - Change (10 years): ▼ −0.8%
- Demonym: Trysling

Official language
  - Norwegian form: Bokmål
- Time zone: UTC+01:00 (CET)
  - Summer (DST): UTC+02:00 (CEST)
- ISO 3166 code: NO-3421
- Website: Official website

Trysil is a municipality in Innlandet county, Norway. It is located in the traditional district of Østerdalen. The administrative centre of the municipality is the village of Innbygda. Other villages in the municipality include Nybergsund, Østby, Plassen, and Tørberget.

The 3,014-square-kilometre (1,164 sq mi) municipality is the 15th largest by area out of the 357 municipalities in Norway. Trysil Municipality is the 152nd most populous municipality in Norway with a population of 6,542. The municipality's population density is 2.2 inhabitants per square kilometre (5.7/sq mi) and its population has decreased by 0.8% over the previous 10-year period.

== General information ==
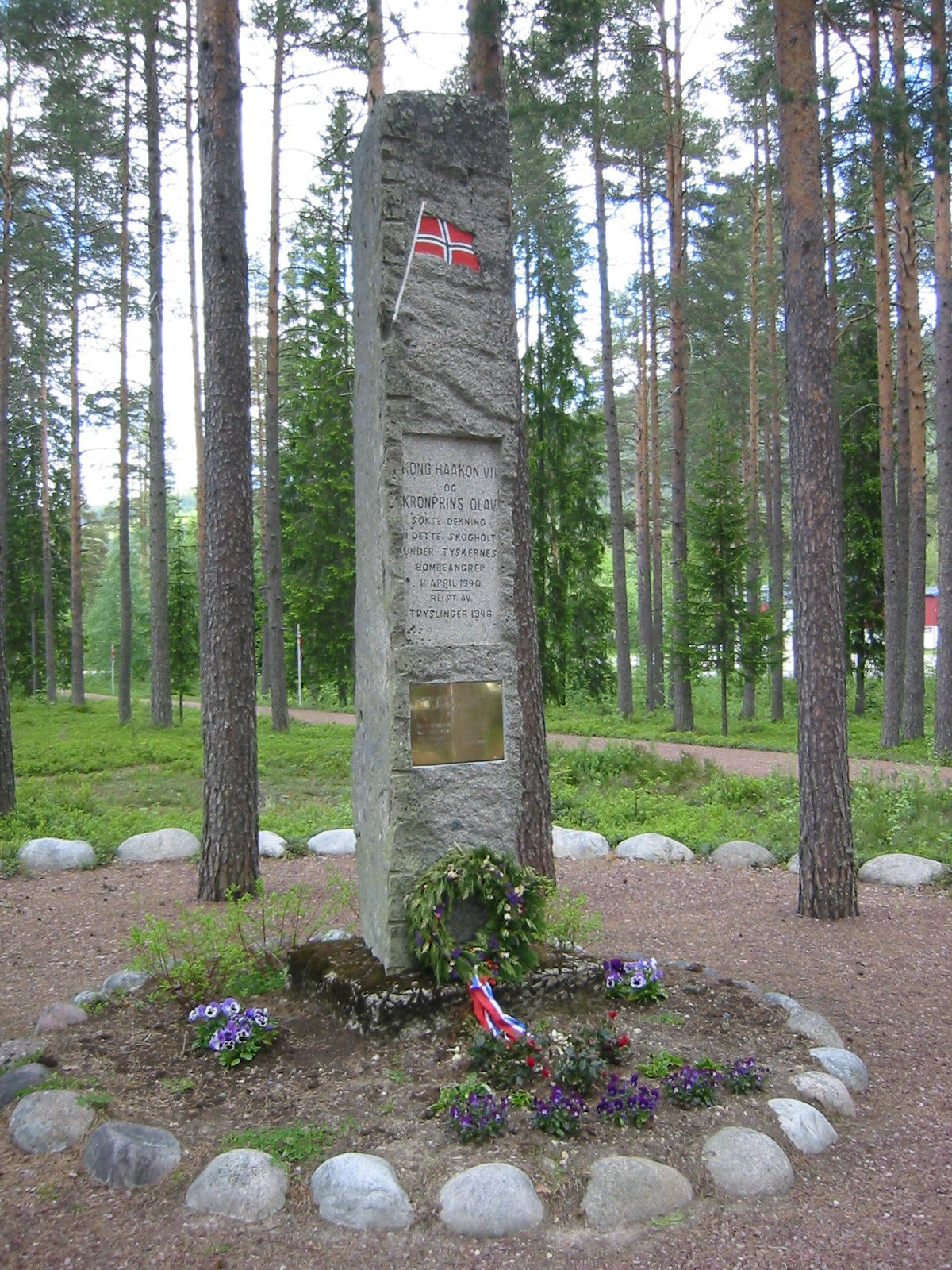
War memorial for the bombardment by German aviators

On 1 January 1838, the prestegjeld of Trysil was established as a civil municipality (see formannskapsdistrikt law). In 1880, the Osneset area in the western part of Trysil Municipality (population: 302) was transferred to the neighboring Åmot Municipality. On 1 January 1911, the northern part of the municipality (population: 291) was separated to join the new Engerdal Municipality. There were also some minor boundary adjustments west of the lake Osensjøen in 1943 and again in 1964 when some areas were transferred from Elverum Municipality to Trysil Municipality.

Historically, the municipality was part of Hedmark county. On 1 January 2020, the municipality became a part of the newly-formed Innlandet county (after Hedmark and Oppland counties were merged).

=== Name ===
The municipality (originally the parish) is named after the old Trysil farm which was most likely the original name of the current Prestgarden ("the vicarage"), where the first Trysil Church was built. The first element possibly comes from the name of a local river, Trya. The meaning of the river name is unknown. The last element is sil which means "quiet stretch of a river". Prior to 1906, the name was spelled "Tryssil".

=== Coat of arms ===
The coat of arms was granted on 21 October 1991. The official blazon is "Azure, two ski poles issuant from the base pointing up" (Norwegian: I blått to oppvoksende sølv skistaver). This means the arms have a blue field (background) and the charge is two vertical ski poles pointing upwards. The charge has a tincture of argent which means it is commonly colored white, but if it is made out of metal, then silver is used. The design is meant to symbolize Trysil in the past, present, and future since skiing has long been an important way of transportation over the years (including the legend of Trysil-Knut), but has more recently become a major tourist attraction. The arms were designed by Bjørn Ellefsæter. The municipal flag has the same design as the coat of arms.

=== Churches ===
The Church of Norway has seven parishes (sokn) within Trysil Municipality. It is part of the Sør-Østerdal prosti (deanery) in the Diocese of Hamar.

Churches in Trysil
Parish (sokn)	Church name	Location of the church	Year built
Ljørdalen	Ljørdalen Church	Ljørdalen	1872
Nordre Trysil	Nordre Trysil Church	Jordet	2000
Søre Trysil	Plassen Church	Plassen	1907
Søre Osen	Søre Osen Church	Søre Osen	1882
Trysil	Trysil Church	Innbygda	1861
Tørberget	Tørberget Church	Tørberget	1922
Østby	Østby Church	Østby	1940

== History ==
Number of minorities (1st and 2nd generation) in Trysil by country of origin in 2017
Ancestry	Number
Sweden	180
Eritrea	60
Poland	57
Netherlands	37
Latvia	28
Iraq	27
Denmark	26
Syria	25

One of the first-known, organized ski races was held here 22 January 1862. Roland Huntford, author of Two Planks and a Passion, describes this race as, "the first truly modern ski race." The famous Norwegian skier Halvard Morgedal won all the competitions that year. The Trysilgutten ski club, founded in 1861, is one of the world's oldest ski clubs. See also the Kiandra snow shoe club and Onion Valley snow shoe club.

The small village of Nybergsund was bombed by German aviators during World War II on 11 April 1940, when King Haakon VII and Crown Prince Olav were there.

== Economy ==
Farming and logging are traditionally the most important occupations in the municipality, and there are many wood related industries. The Trysilelva river was the last river in Norway with traditional timber floating. There is extensive wildlife, including a large moose population.

Trysilfjellet is the largest winter sports centre in Norway with 65 prepared slopes.

== Government ==
Trysil Municipality is responsible for primary education (through 10th grade), outpatient health services, senior citizen services, welfare and other social services, zoning, economic development, and municipal roads and utilities. The municipality is governed by a municipal council of directly elected representatives. The mayor is indirectly elected by a vote of the municipal council. The municipality is under the jurisdiction of the Hedmarken og Østerdal District Court and the Eidsivating Court of Appeal.

=== Municipal council ===
The municipal council (Kommunestyre) of Trysil Municipality is made up of 23 representatives that are elected to four year terms. The tables below show the current and historical composition of the council by political party.

Trysil kommunestyre 2023–2027
Party name (in Norwegian)	Number of representatives
Labour Party (Arbeiderpartiet)	8
Progress Party (Fremskrittspartiet)	2
Conservative Party (Høyre)	4
Red Party (Rødt)	1
Centre Party (Senterpartiet)	8
Socialist Left Party (Sosialistisk Venstreparti)	2
Total number of members:	23

Trysil kommunestyre 2019–2023
Party name (in Norwegian)	Number of representatives
Labour Party (Arbeiderpartiet)	8
Progress Party (Fremskrittspartiet)	1
Conservative Party (Høyre)	3
Centre Party (Senterpartiet)	10
Socialist Left Party (Sosialistisk Venstreparti)	1
Total number of members:	23

Trysil kommunestyre 2015–2019
Party name (in Norwegian)	Number of representatives
Labour Party (Arbeiderpartiet)	11
Progress Party (Fremskrittspartiet)	1
Conservative Party (Høyre)	6
Centre Party (Senterpartiet)	6
Socialist Left Party (Sosialistisk Venstreparti)	1
Total number of members:	25

Trysil kommunestyre 2011–2015
Party name (in Norwegian)	Number of representatives
Labour Party (Arbeiderpartiet)	9
Progress Party (Fremskrittspartiet)	2
Conservative Party (Høyre)	6
Christian Democratic Party (Kristelig Folkeparti)	1
Centre Party (Senterpartiet)	4
Socialist Left Party (Sosialistisk Venstreparti)	2
Liberal Party (Venstre)	1
Total number of members:	25

Trysil kommunestyre 2007–2011
Party name (in Norwegian)	Number of representatives
Labour Party (Arbeiderpartiet)	9
Progress Party (Fremskrittspartiet)	3
Conservative Party (Høyre)	3
Christian Democratic Party (Kristelig Folkeparti)	1
Centre Party (Senterpartiet)	4
Socialist Left Party (Sosialistisk Venstreparti)	3
Liberal Party (Venstre)	2
Total number of members:	25

Trysil kommunestyre 2003–2007
Party name (in Norwegian)	Number of representatives
Labour Party (Arbeiderpartiet)	11
Progress Party (Fremskrittspartiet)	3
Conservative Party (Høyre)	2
Christian Democratic Party (Kristelig Folkeparti)	1
Centre Party (Senterpartiet)	4
Socialist Left Party (Sosialistisk Venstreparti)	3
Liberal Party (Venstre)	1
Total number of members:	25

Trysil kommunestyre 1999–2003
Party name (in Norwegian)	Number of representatives
Labour Party (Arbeiderpartiet)	12
Progress Party (Fremskrittspartiet)	1
Conservative Party (Høyre)	4
Christian Democratic Party (Kristelig Folkeparti)	1
Centre Party (Senterpartiet)	3
Socialist Left Party (Sosialistisk Venstreparti)	3
Liberal Party (Venstre)	1
Total number of members:	25

Trysil kommunestyre 1995–1999
Party name (in Norwegian)	Number of representatives
Labour Party (Arbeiderpartiet)	14
Conservative Party (Høyre)	4
Christian Democratic Party (Kristelig Folkeparti)	2
Centre Party (Senterpartiet)	8
Socialist Left Party (Sosialistisk Venstreparti)	4
Liberal Party (Venstre)	1
Total number of members:	33

Trysil kommunestyre 1991–1995
Party name (in Norwegian)	Number of representatives
Labour Party (Arbeiderpartiet)	14
Conservative Party (Høyre)	3
Christian Democratic Party (Kristelig Folkeparti)	2
Centre Party (Senterpartiet)	7
Socialist Left Party (Sosialistisk Venstreparti)	6
Liberal Party (Venstre)	1
Total number of members:	33

Trysil kommunestyre 1987–1991
Party name (in Norwegian)	Number of representatives
Labour Party (Arbeiderpartiet)	20
Conservative Party (Høyre)	4
Christian Democratic Party (Kristelig Folkeparti)	2
Centre Party (Senterpartiet)	4
Socialist Left Party (Sosialistisk Venstreparti)	2
Liberal Party (Venstre)	1
Total number of members:	33

Trysil kommunestyre 1983–1987
Party name (in Norwegian)	Number of representatives
Labour Party (Arbeiderpartiet)	20
Conservative Party (Høyre)	4
Christian Democratic Party (Kristelig Folkeparti)	2
Centre Party (Senterpartiet)	5
Socialist Left Party (Sosialistisk Venstreparti)	2
Total number of members:	33

Trysil kommunestyre 1979–1983
Party name (in Norwegian)	Number of representatives
Labour Party (Arbeiderpartiet)	18
Conservative Party (Høyre)	4
Christian Democratic Party (Kristelig Folkeparti)	2
Centre Party (Senterpartiet)	7
Socialist Left Party (Sosialistisk Venstreparti)	2
Total number of members:	33

Trysil kommunestyre 1975–1979
Party name (in Norwegian)	Number of representatives
Labour Party (Arbeiderpartiet)	17
Conservative Party (Høyre)	2
Christian Democratic Party (Kristelig Folkeparti)	3
Centre Party (Senterpartiet)	8
Socialist Left Party (Sosialistisk Venstreparti)	3
Total number of members:	33

Trysil kommunestyre 1971–1975
Party name (in Norwegian)	Number of representatives
Labour Party (Arbeiderpartiet)	18
Conservative Party (Høyre)	1
Communist Party (Kommunistiske Parti)	2
Centre Party (Senterpartiet)	10
Socialist People's Party (Sosialistisk Folkeparti)	1
Liberal Party (Venstre)	1
Total number of members:	33

Trysil kommunestyre 1967–1971
Party name (in Norwegian)	Number of representatives
Labour Party (Arbeiderpartiet)	18
Conservative Party (Høyre)	1
Communist Party (Kommunistiske Parti)	2
Centre Party (Senterpartiet)	9
Socialist People's Party (Sosialistisk Folkeparti)	1
Liberal Party (Venstre)	2
Total number of members:	33

Trysil kommunestyre 1963–1967
Party name (in Norwegian)	Number of representatives
Labour Party (Arbeiderpartiet)	18
Conservative Party (Høyre)	2
Communist Party (Kommunistiske Parti)	2
Centre Party (Senterpartiet)	9
Liberal Party (Venstre)	2
Total number of members:	33

Trysil herredsstyre 1959–1963
Party name (in Norwegian)	Number of representatives
Labour Party (Arbeiderpartiet)	16
Conservative Party (Høyre)	2
Communist Party (Kommunistiske Parti)	3
Centre Party (Senterpartiet)	10
Liberal Party (Venstre)	2
Total number of members:	33

Trysil herredsstyre 1955–1959
Party name (in Norwegian)	Number of representatives
Labour Party (Arbeiderpartiet)	18
Conservative Party (Høyre)	2
Communist Party (Kommunistiske Parti)	3
Farmers' Party (Bondepartiet)	8
Liberal Party (Venstre)	2
Total number of members:	33

Trysil herredsstyre 1951–1955
Party name (in Norwegian)	Number of representatives
Labour Party (Arbeiderpartiet)	15
Conservative Party (Høyre)	1
Communist Party (Kommunistiske Parti)	2
Farmers' Party (Bondepartiet)	4
Liberal Party (Venstre)	2
Total number of members:	24

Trysil herredsstyre 1947–1951
Party name (in Norwegian)	Number of representatives
Labour Party (Arbeiderpartiet)	14
Conservative Party (Høyre)	1
Communist Party (Kommunistiske Parti)	3
Farmers' Party (Bondepartiet)	3
Joint list of the Liberal Party (Venstre) and the Radical People's Party (Radikale Folkepartiet)	2
Joint List(s) of Non-Socialist Parties (Borgerlige Felleslister)	1
Total number of members:	24

Trysil herredsstyre 1945–1947
Party name (in Norwegian)	Number of representatives
Labour Party (Arbeiderpartiet)	15
Communist Party (Kommunistiske Parti)	4
Farmers' Party (Bondepartiet)	2
Joint list of the Liberal Party (Venstre) and the Radical People's Party (Radikale Folkepartiet)	2
Joint List(s) of Non-Socialist Parties (Borgerlige Felleslister)	1
Total number of members:	24

Trysil herredsstyre 1937–1941*
Party name (in Norwegian)	Number of representatives
Labour Party (Arbeiderpartiet)	15
Conservative Party (Høyre)	1
Nasjonal Samling Party (Nasjonal Samling)	1
Farmers' Party (Bondepartiet)	3
Joint list of the Liberal Party and Small Farmholders (Samlingsliste: Venstre og Småbrukere)	3
Joint List(s) of Non-Socialist Parties (Borgerlige Felleslister)	1
Total number of members:	24
Note: Due to the German occupation of Norway during World War II, no elections were held for new municipal councils until after the war ended in 1945.

=== Mayors ===
The mayor (Norwegian: ordfører) of Trysil Municipality is the political leader of the municipality and the chairperson of the municipal council. Here is a list of people who have held this position:

- 1838–1839: Paul Irgens Dybdahl
- 1839–1841: Arne Arnesen
- 1841–1843: Jo Jonsen Lunde
- 1843–1845: Paul D. Gleditsch
- 1845–1847: Halvor E. Lunde
- 1847–1853: Ole Nyhuus, Sr.
- 1853–1859: Halvor Strandvold
- 1859–1863: Ola Nyhuus, Jr.
- 1863–1867: Johan Landgraff
- 1867–1867: Albert Balchen
- 1867–1871: Erik Johnsen Kveen
- 1871–1875: Johan Landgraff
- 1875–1879: Hans Nysæter
- 1879–1881: Johan Rønningen (V)
- 1881–1889: Per Galaasen (V)
- 1889–1891: Johan Rønningen (V)
- 1891–1893: Bernhard Holt (V)
- 1893–1895: Otto Rundfloen (V)
- 1895–1898: Johan Rønningen (V)
- 1899–1901: Bernhard Holt (V)
- 1902–1904: Martin Nyhuus (V)
- 1905–1919: Halvor Lunde (ArbDem)
- 1920–1922: Kristian Ingmar Moe (Ap)
- 1923–1925: John G. Østby (V)
- 1926–1931: August Aastad (Ap)
- 1932–1934: John G. Østby (V)
- 1935–1937: August Aastad (Ap)
- 1938–1940: Harald Løbak (Ap)
- 1941–1945: Harald Lunde (NS)
- 1945–1955: Harald Løbak (Ap)
- 1956–1963: Engebret Sørli (Ap)
- 1964–1971: Harald Berget (Ap)
- 1972–1999: Arvid Nyberg (Ap)
- 1999–2015: Ole Martin Norderhaug (Ap)
- 2015–2023: Erik Sletten (Sp)
- 2023–present: Turid Backe-Viken (Ap)

== Geography ==
Trysil is bordered in the north by Engerdal Municipality and Rendalen Municipality, in the west by Åmot Municipality, and in the southwest by Elverum Municipality and Våler Municipality. The eastern border of the municipality is bordered in the north, east and south by Sweden. The main village in Trysil is Innbygda, which often is referred to as Trysil. The highest point in the municipality is the 1,209.09-metre (3,966.8 ft) tall mountain Tverrfjellet, located on the northern border with Engerdal Municipality.

=== Climate ===
Trysil has a boreal climate (subarctic climate) (Köppen Dfc) with cold winters and warm summers. Due to its inland location, Trysil has comfortably warm summer highs, but colder winters than most other populated places in Southern Norway. Winter temperatures are often lower in Trysil than they are in coastal areas of Northern Norway above the Arctic Circle.

Mean temperature in January is −8 °C (18 °F) and in July 15 °C (59 °F). The all-time highest temperature is 33.8 °C (92.8 °F) recorded 26 July 2008. On 2 March 2005 a low of −32.9 °C (−27.2 °F) was recorded, and 13 February 2011 saw a low of −32.5 °C (−26.5 °F). Late winter and spring is the driest season while late summer and autumn is wettest season. The weather station started operating in 1993 and is located near Mosanden Næringspark, about 4 kilometres (2.5 mi) south of Innbygda.

Climate data for Trysil-Mosanden 1991-2020 (360 m)
Month	Jan	Feb	Mar	Apr	May	Jun	Jul	Aug	Sep	Oct	Nov	Dec	Year
Daily mean °C (°F)	−8.1 (17.4)	−7.8 (18.0)	−3.0 (26.6)	2.1 (35.8)	7.6 (45.7)	12.2 (54.0)	15.0 (59.0)	13.1 (55.6)	8.4 (47.1)	2.3 (36.1)	−2.4 (27.7)	−7.2 (19.0)	2.7 (36.8)
Average precipitation mm (inches)	58 (2.3)	47 (1.9)	39 (1.5)	43 (1.7)	73 (2.9)	77 (3.0)	85 (3.3)	104 (4.1)	86 (3.4)	87 (3.4)	90 (3.5)	68 (2.7)	857 (33.7)
Source: yr.no/Norwegian Meteorological Institute

=== Nature ===
Trysil is a place to explore the Norwegian nature and participating in various outdoor activities like guided trips, river fishing, dog sledge driving, elk safari, night photography, stargazing. This includes a mountain at Norway's largest ski resort, which offers many of the country's most widely acclaimed downhill and slalom slopes.

== Notable people ==
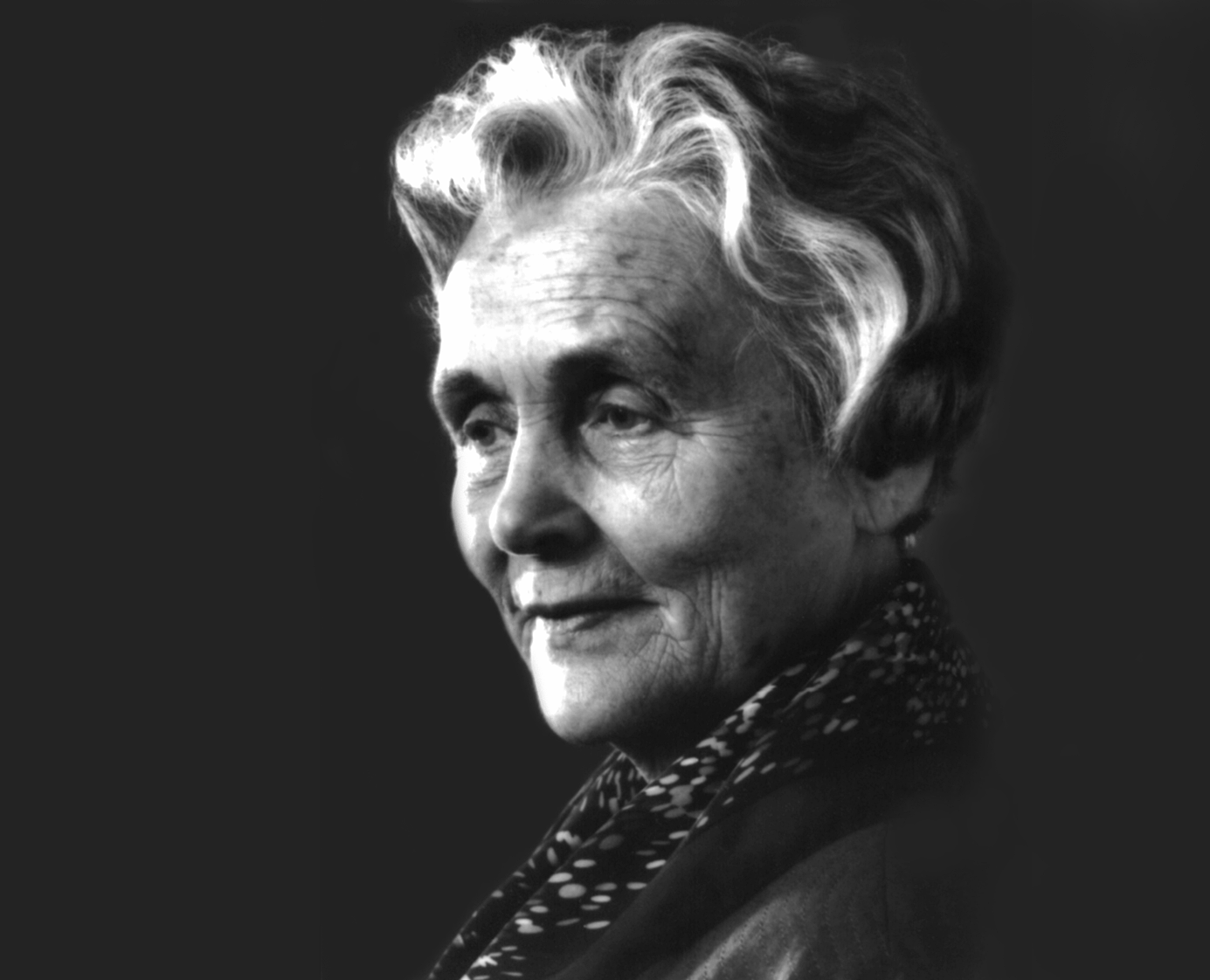
Halldis Moren Vesaas

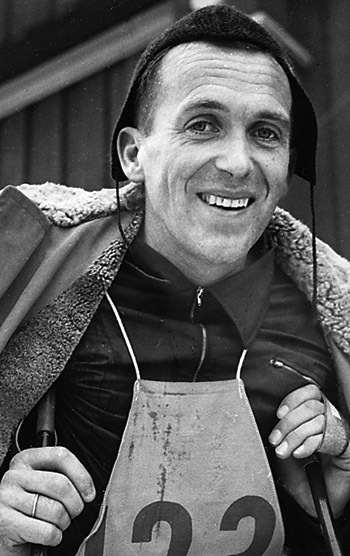
Hallgeir Brenden, 1950s

- Axel Smith (1744–1823), a priest and topographer
- Haakon Nyhuus (1866–1913), a librarian and encyclopedist
- Sven Moren (1871–1938), a farmer, poet, playwright, children's writer and politician
- Olaf L. Olsen (1881–1958), an American legislator and politician
- Halvor Floden (1884–1956), a schoolteacher, children's writer, novelist, poet and playwright
- Einar Skjæraasen (1900–1966), an author, poet and political candidate
- Halldis Moren Vesaas (1907–1995), a poet, translator and writer of children's books
- Sigmund Moren (1913–1996), a philologist, literary critic, theatre critic and children's writer
- Tormod Haugen (1945–2008), a writer of children's books and translator, winner of the H.C. Andersen prize
- Jan Axel Blomberg (born 1969), a heavy metal drummer, stage name Hellhammer

=== Sport ===
- Karl Magnus Satre (1904–1955) & Paul Ottar Satre (1908–1984), a pair of American ski jumpers and cross-country skiers who competed for the US at the 1936 Winter Olympics
- Kåre Hatten (1908–1983), a cross-country skier, lumberjack and farmer; competed in the 1936 Winter Olympics
- Hallgeir Brenden (1929–2007), a cross-country skier and steeplechase runner, twice individual gold medallist at the 1956 and 1960 Winter Olympics and twice team silver medallist at the 1952 and 1956 Winter Olympics
- Johan Sætre (born 1952), a former ski jumper; participated in the 1976 and 1980 Winter Olympics
- Arnfinn Engerbakk (born 1964), a footballer who played 12 seasons in Eliteserien for Kongsvinger; capped four times for Norway
- Anita Moen (born 1967), a cross-country skier; five time medalist at the Winter Olympics, three silvers in 1994, 1998, 2002 and two bronzes in 1998 & 2002
- Jarl-André Storbæk (born 1978), a footballer who played 11 seasons in Eliteserien (league champion in 2013); capped 17 times for Norway
- Håvard Storbæk (born 1986), a footballer who played 10 seasons in Eliteserien for three different clubs; cousin of Jarl-André Storbæk
- Kim-Rune Hansen (born 1988), a professional snowboarder for Burton Snowboards

== Sister cities ==
Trysil has sister city agreements with the following places:

- Sweden: Kil in Värmland County
- Finland: Laihia in Länsi-Suomi

== Media gallery ==
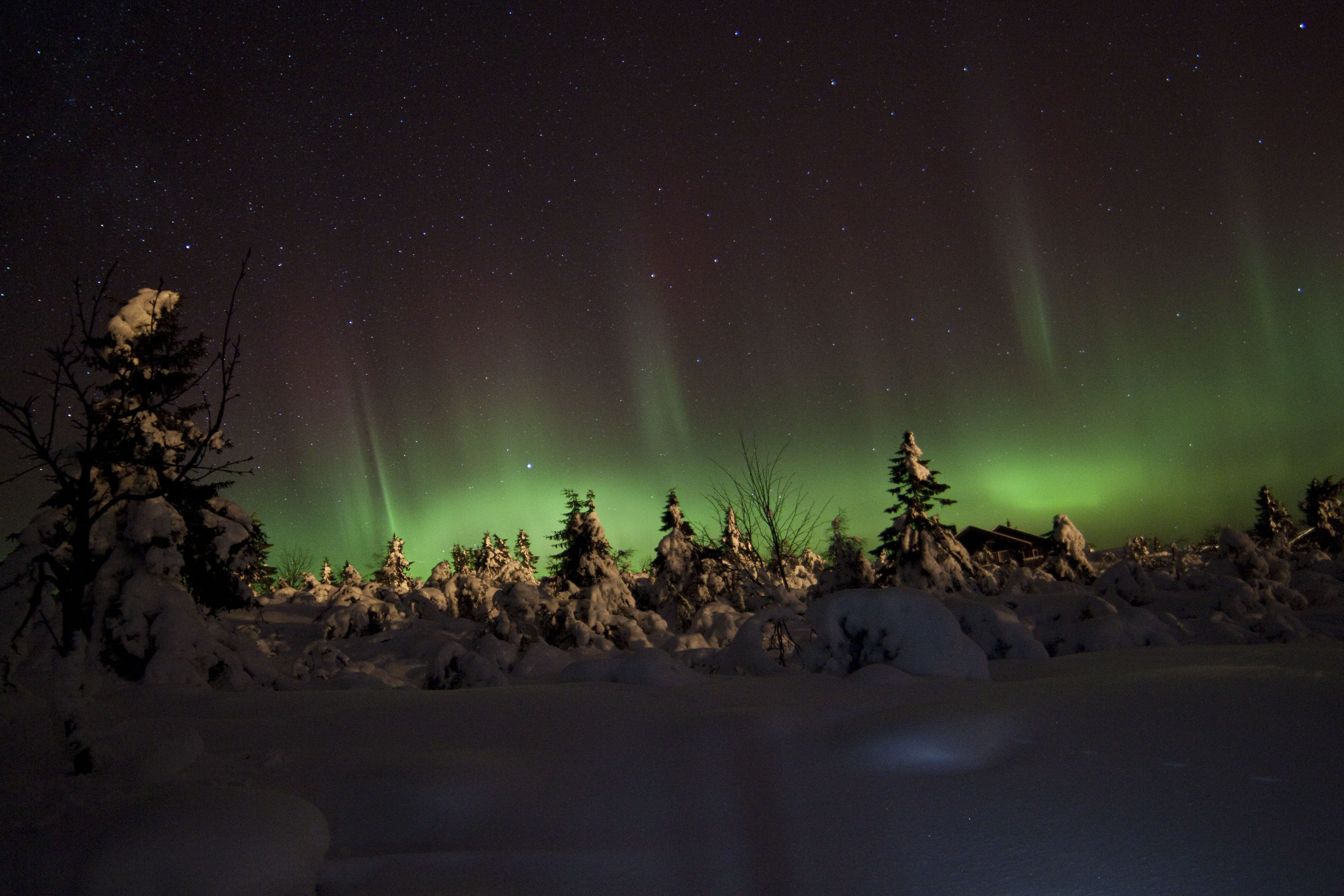
Aurora Borealis in Trysil

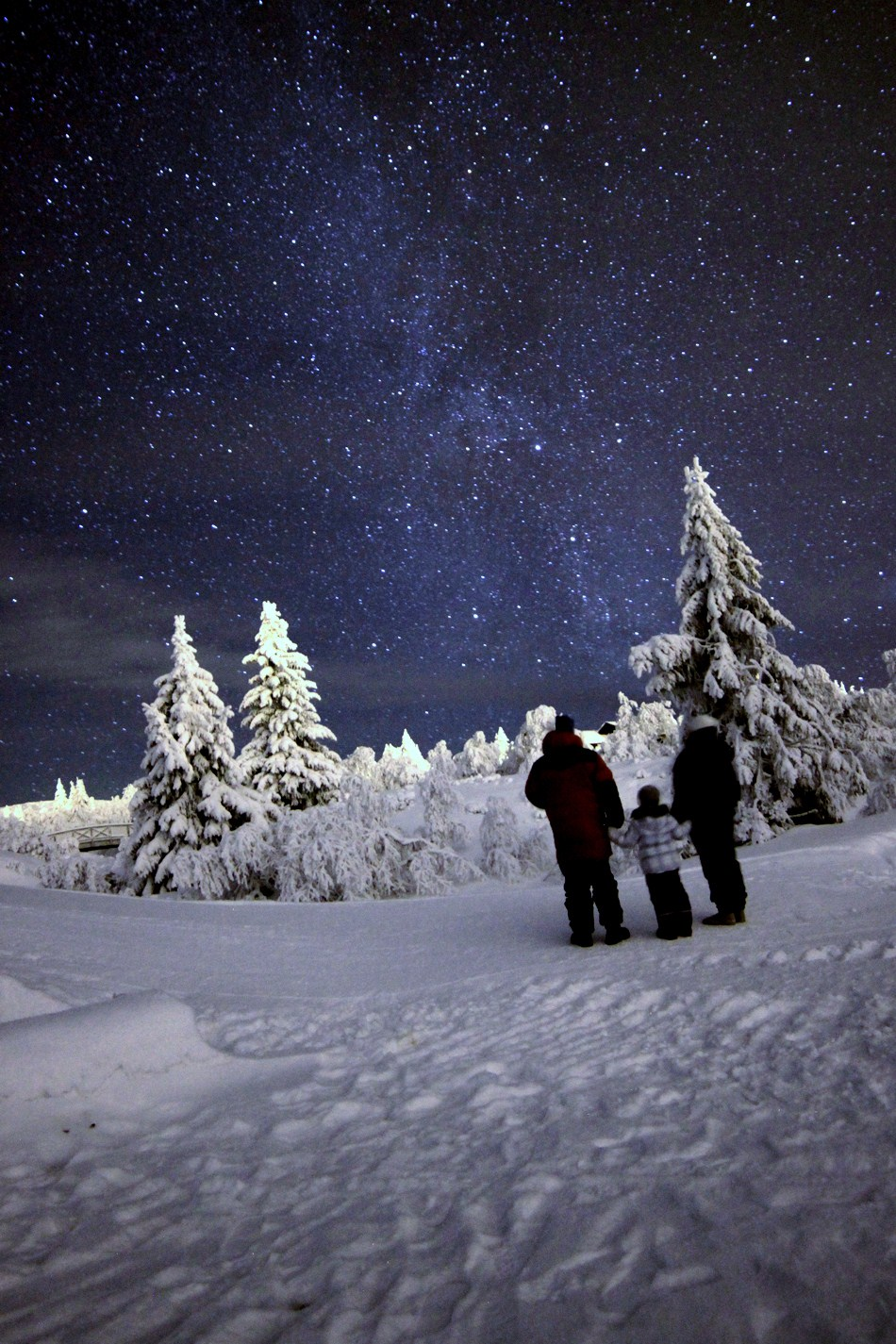
Milky Way galaxy in Trysil

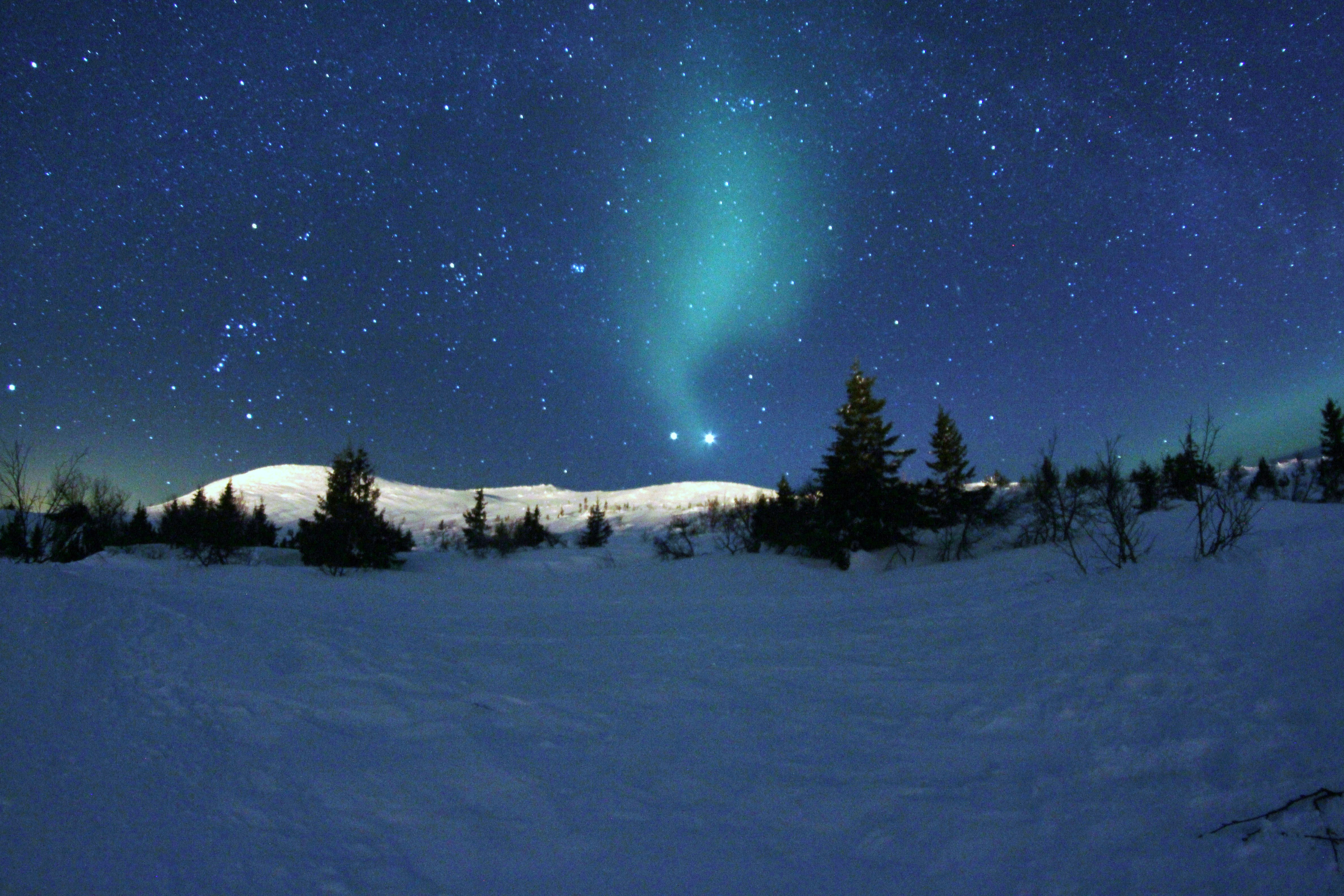
The rare conjunction of Venus, Jupiter created stunning night skies in Trysil

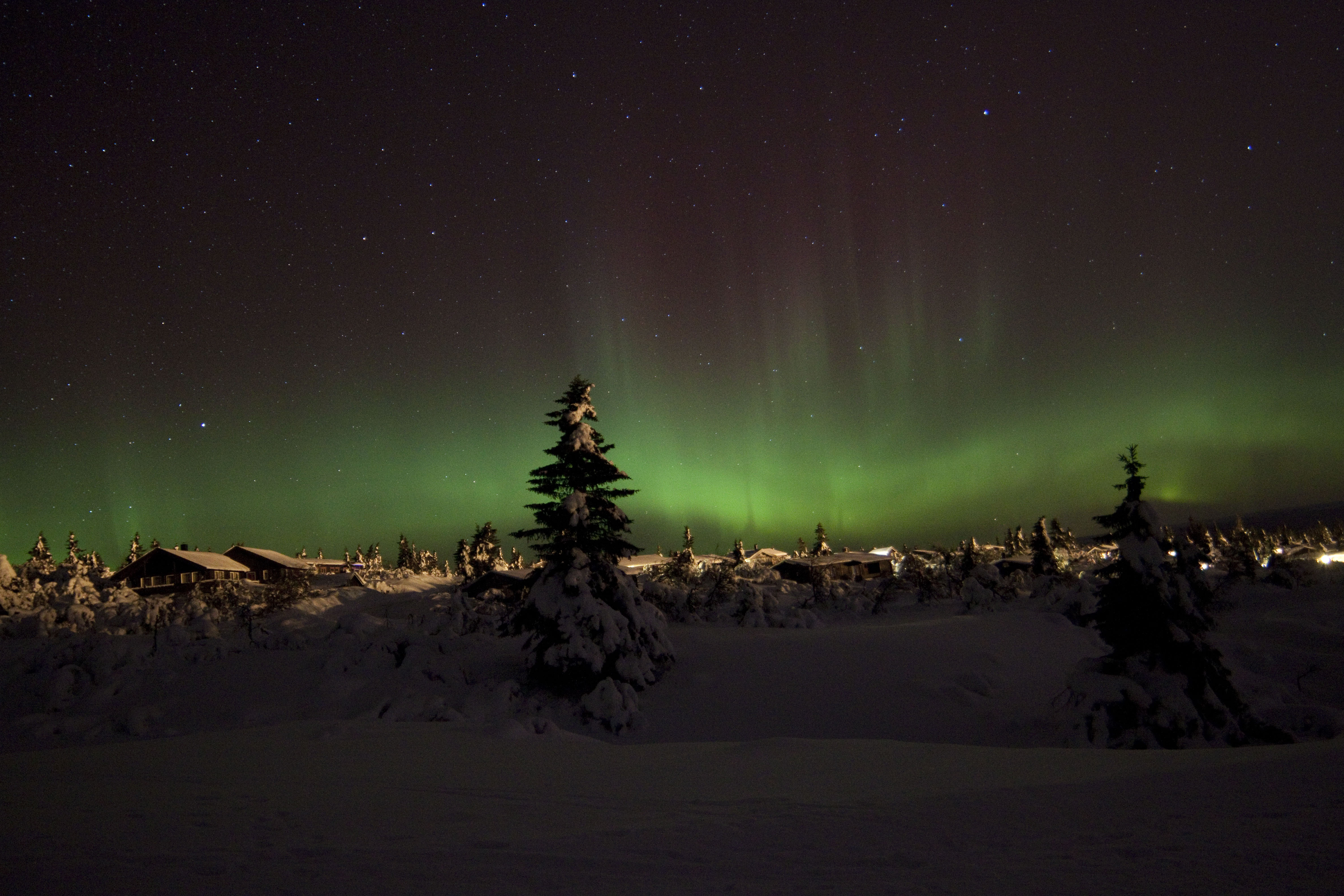
Aurora Borealis in Trysil

== See also ==
- Scandinavian Mountains Airport
