= Tørberget =

Village in Trysil Municipality, Norway

Tørberget Tørrberget
- Village
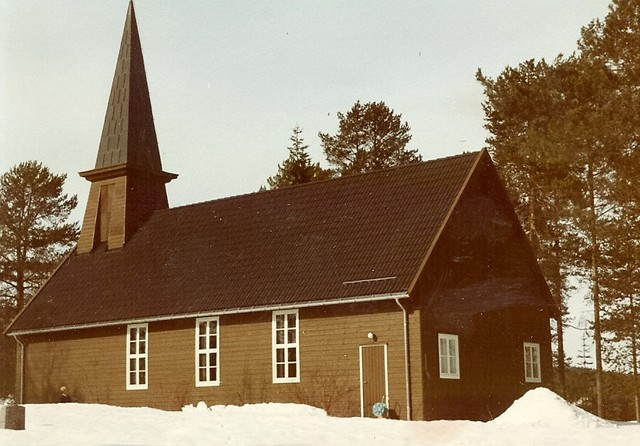
- View of the village church
- Interactive map of Tørberget
- Location within Innlandet Location within Norway
- Coordinates: 61.1331°N 12.11107°E
- Country: Norway
- Region: Eastern Norway
- County: Innlandet
- District: Østerdalen
- Municipality: Trysil Municipality
- Elevation: 490 m (1,610 ft)
- Time zone: UTC+01:00 (CET)
  - Summer (DST): UTC+02:00 (CEST)
- Post Code: 2429 Tørberget

Tørberget is a small village in Trysil Municipality in Innlandet county, Norway. It is the birthplace of Olympian Hallgeir Brenden. The village is located along the Norwegian National Road 25, about 20 kilometres (12 mi) southwest of the villages of Nybergsund and Innbygda and about 15 kilometres (9.3 mi) northwest of the border with Sweden. Tørberget Church is located in the village.
