= Nybergsund Stadion =

Football stadium in Nybergsund, Innlandet, Norway

- Interactive map of Nybergsund Stadion
- Location: Nybergsund, Trysil Municipality, Norway
- Coordinates: 61°15′57″N 12°19′15″E
- Surface: Artificial turf

Tenant
- Nybergsund IL-Trysil

Nybergsund Stadion is an association football venue located in Nybergsund in Trysil Municipality, Norway. It is the home ground of Nybergsund IL-Trysil. The pitch has artificial turf. The pitch has a capacity of 1,500 seated spectators, in addition to standing places.
