= Nordre Trysil Church =

Church in Innlandet, Norway

- Nordre Trysil kirke
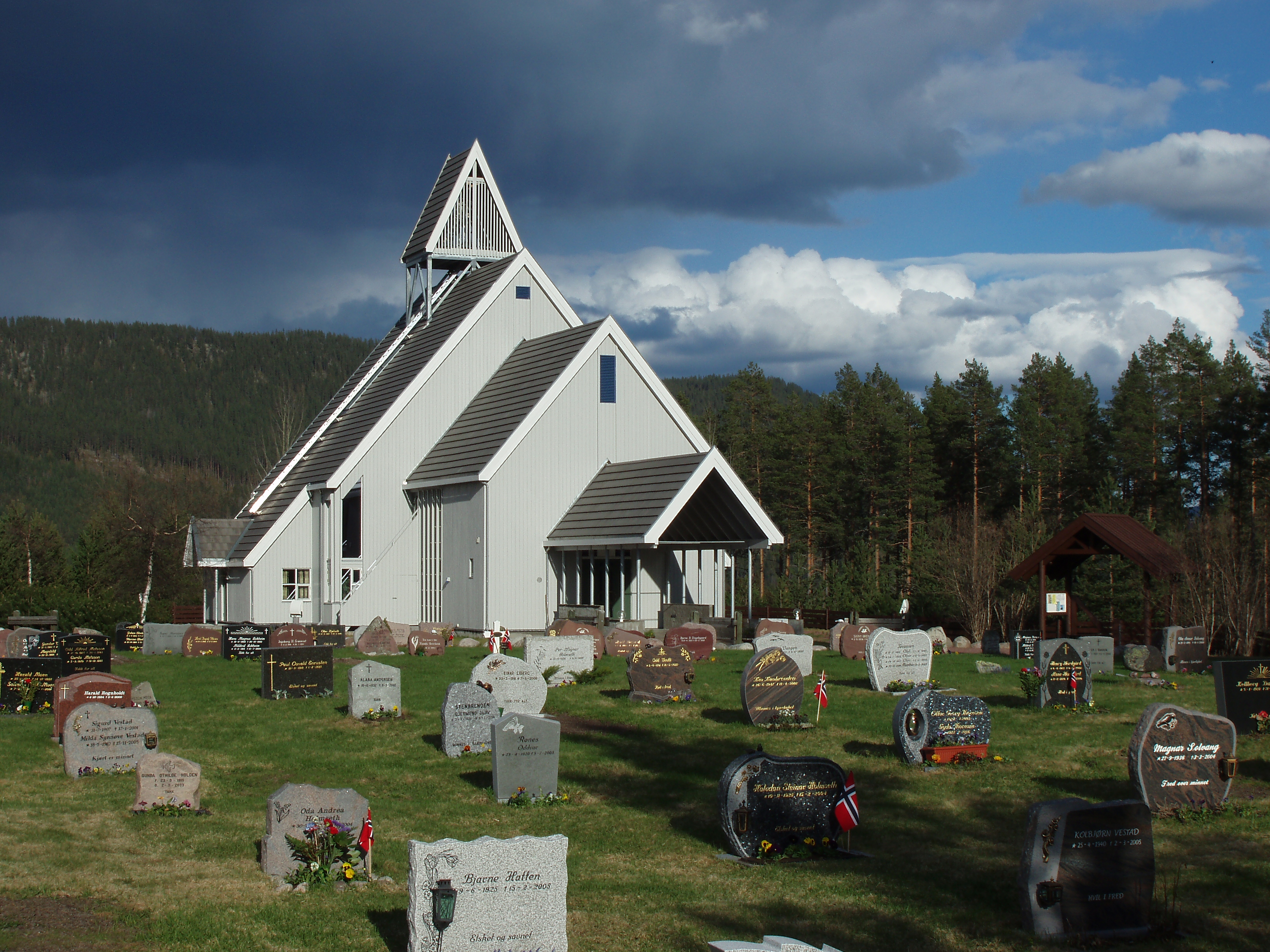
- View of the church
- Nordre Trysil Church
- 61°24′53″N 12°08′16″E
- Location: Trysil Municipality, Innlandet
- Country: Norway
- Denomination: Church of Norway
- Churchmanship: Evangelical Lutheran

History
- Status: Parish church
- Founded: 2000
- Consecrated: 26 November 2000

Architecture
- Functional status: Active
- Architect: Anders Gunnestad
- Architectural type: Fan-shaped
- Completed: 2000 (26 years ago)

Specifications
- Capacity: 210
- Materials: Wood

Administration
- Diocese: Hamar bispedømme
- Deanery: Sør-Østerdal prosti
- Parish: Nordre Trysil

Nordre Trysil Church (Norwegian: Nordre Trysil kirke) is a parish church of the Church of Norway in Trysil Municipality in Innlandet county, Norway. It is located in the village of Jordet. It is the church for the Nordre Trysil parish which is part of the Sør-Østerdal prosti (deanery) in the Diocese of Hamar. The gray, wooden church was built in a fan-shaped design in 2000 using plans drawn up by the architect Anders Gunnestad. The church seats about 210 people.

== History ==
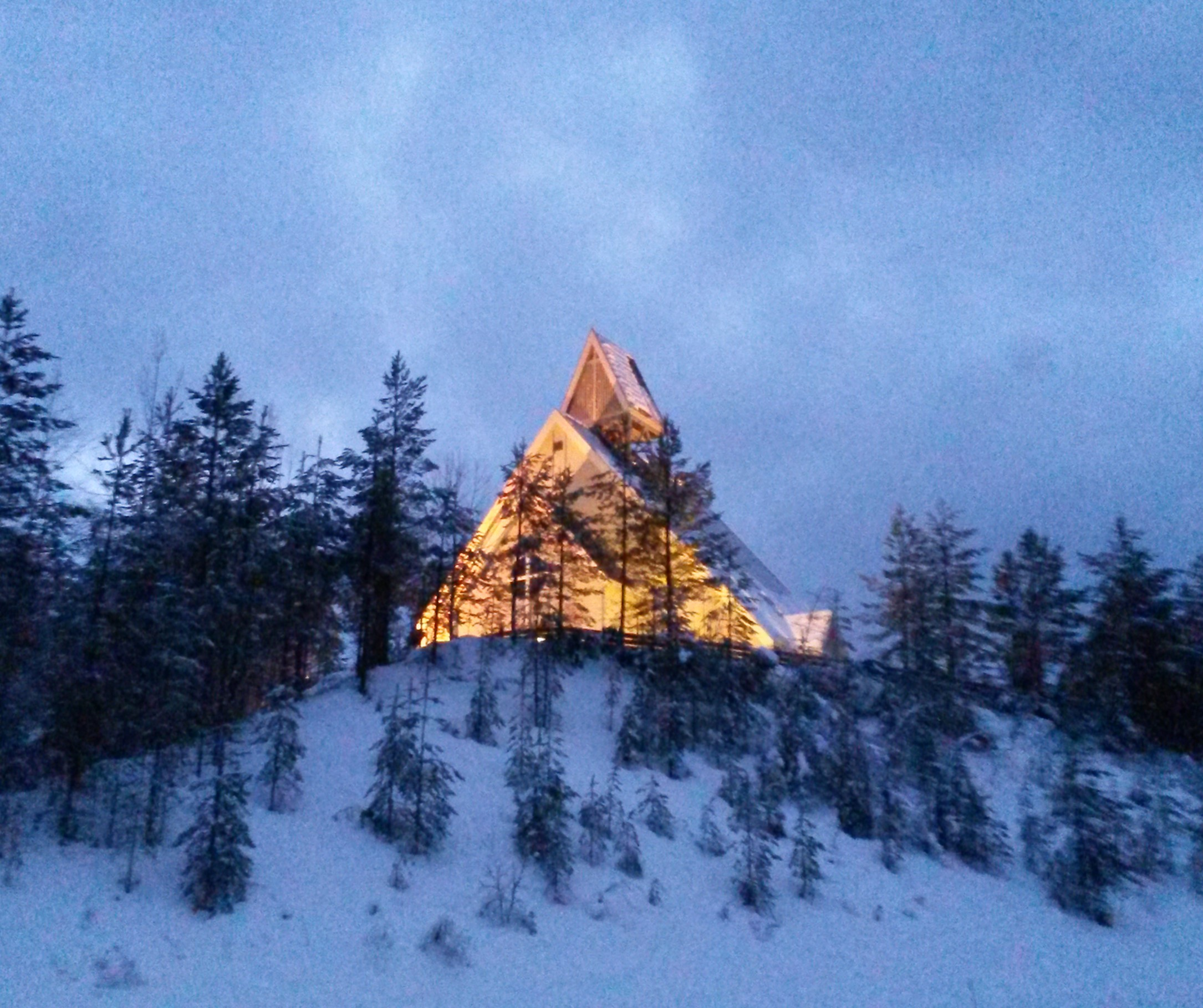
View of the church

In 1992, a cemetery with a bell tower was built in Jordet where the church now stands. Soon after, work began on planning for a church on the site. The architect was Anders Gunnestad from Hamar, and the building contractor was the firm Nymoen og Joten Bygg from Engerdal. The building was constructed in 2000, with the foundation stone being laid in the early spring and the church was consecrated on 26 November 2000, by the Bishop Rosemarie Köhn. The church construction cost 5.2 million kr, with the municipality paying about 70% of the cost and the rest being paid for with gifts and donations.

== See also ==
- List of churches in Hamar
