= Nybergsund =

Village in Innlandet, Norway

- Village
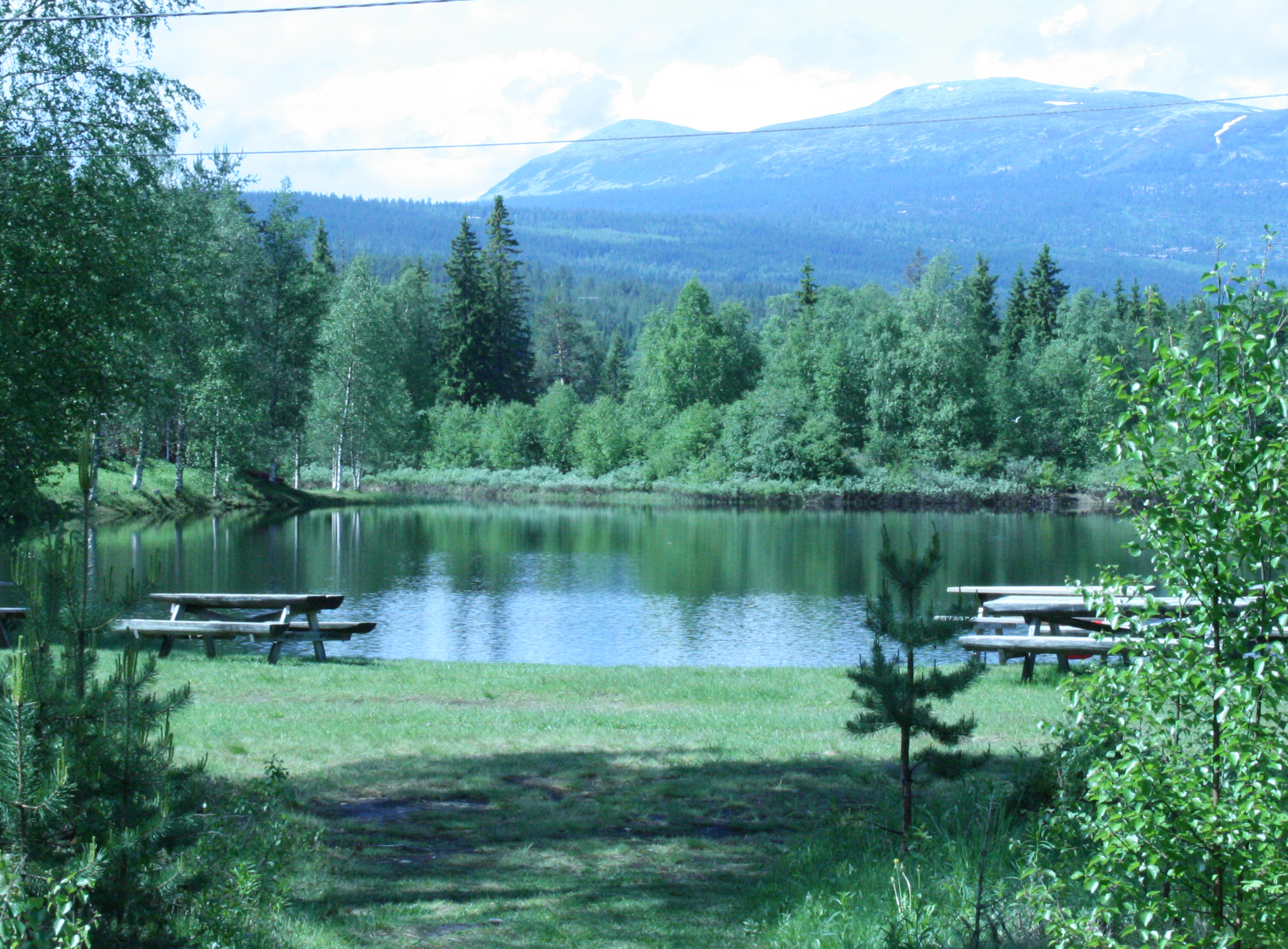
- A popular local bathing spot on the lake Tjønna, with the mountain Trysilfjellet in the background
- Interactive map of Nybergsund
- Location within Innlandet Location within Norway
- Coordinates: 61.26121°N 12.32265°E
- Country: Norway
- Region: Eastern Norway
- County: Innlandet
- District: Østerdalen
- Municipality: Trysil Municipality

Area
  - Total: 0.57 km^{2} (0.22 sq mi)
- Elevation: 355 m (1,165 ft)

Population (2024)
  - Total: 365
  - Density: 640/km^{2} (1,700/sq mi)
- Time zone: UTC+01:00 (CET)
  - Summer (DST): UTC+02:00 (CEST)
- Post Code: 2422 Nybergsund
- Website: nybergsund.no

Nybergsund is a village in Trysil Municipality in Innlandet county, Norway. It is located about 5 kilometres (3.1 mi) south of the village of Innbygda which is the municipal centre of Trysil. The village is best known for serving as a hiding place for the Norwegian royal family and Cabinet and sustaining German bombing during the German conquest of Norway. The village is also the birthplace of award-winning Norwegian writer and translator Tormod Haugen.

The 0.57-square-kilometre (140-acre) village has a population (2024) of 365 and a population density of 640 inhabitants per square kilometre (1,700/sq mi).

== General information ==
=== Location ===
Nybergsund is located about 5 kilometres (3.1 mi) south of the administrative center Innbygda. The village is built on the eastern banks of the Trysilelva (Trysil River), which is a segment of the larger river known in Sweden as Klarälven. Nybergsund is located roughly 25 km (16 mi) away from Norway's border with Sweden.

=== Name ===
Nybergsund was named after a local farm, Nyberg, and the element -sund, meaning strait. In the village's early days, the site of Nyberg farm was used as a harbor for ferries that went along Trysilelva.

== History ==
=== World War II ===
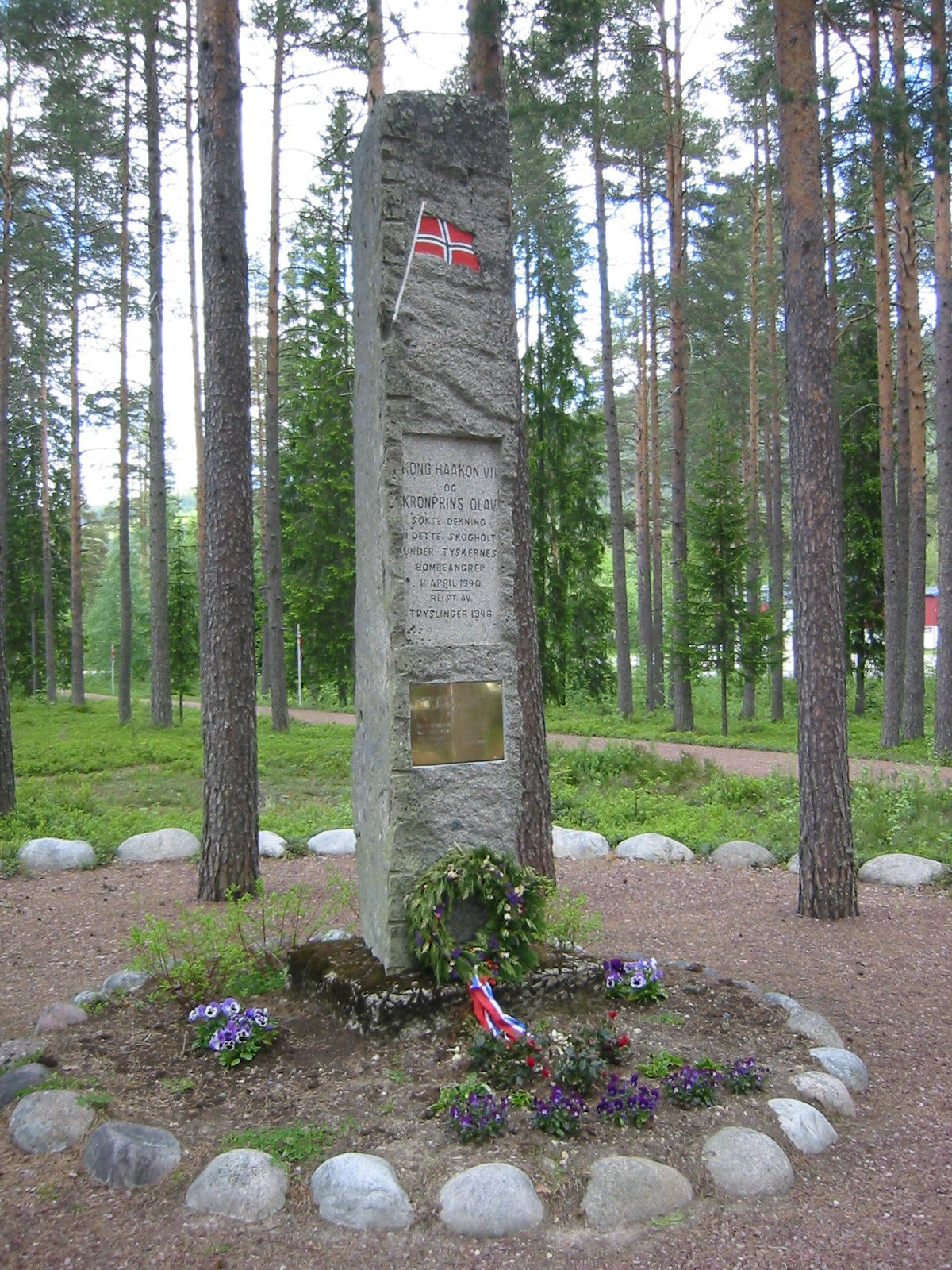
The monument commemorating the bombing in Kongeparken, erected 1946

Two nights after the invasion of Norway, on 11 April 1940, King Haakon VII, Crown Prince Olav, and the fleeing Norwegian government sought refuge in Nybergsund. Previously, they had been staying in the nearby town of Elverum to the southwest, where the Elverum Authorization was made that gave absolute power to the executive branch after the Parliament of Norway could no longer safely convene in Oslo. It was in Nybergsund that King Haakon met with his Cabinet, telling them of the ultimatum he received when he had met with German Minister to Norway, Curt Bräuer. The minister had urged him to follow the example of his brother Christian X of Denmark and capitulate, appointing the fascist leader Vidkun Quisling as the new Norwegian Prime Minister. King Haakon had already refused the minister's demands, despite threats of harsh conditions for Norway if he did not comply, but he also said that he could not give a decision until he consulted with the government ministers, who had the final word. In an emotional meeting with the Cabinet, King Haakon said that he felt it was against his duty as king and the will of the Norwegian people to give in to the demands, but he would abdicate so as not to stand in the way if the Government decided otherwise.

Within hours, the Cabinet had made their decision to not capitulate. They reached Minister Bräuer by telephone that night to inform him of their decision. They also broadcast a message to the Norwegian people on NRK, reiterating their decision and promising that Norway would resist the invasion for as long as possible.

Nybergsund was bombed by Luftwaffe aircraft at about 17:00 the next day, on 11 April 1940. No one was killed in the attack, but a number of buildings were destroyed, among them a local co-op, school, and telephone exchange office. When the bombing began, the royal family and cabinet ministers fled from their hotel out into the snow-covered forest nearby. The government then continued farther north towards Molde, where they were picked up by ship to Tromsø, which would later become the provisional capital until the country was completely under Germany's control in June 1940.

After the war, the area of forest that the royal family and cabinet sought refuge in became a park known as Kongeparken (The King Park). In 1946, King Haakon presented the park with a stone monument commemorating the bombing, and the event drew over 8,000 people. In 1990, on the 50th anniversary of the bombing, King Olav V unveiled a bust of his father, Haakon, to sit alongside the monument. Prime Minister Jan P. Syse and President of Parliament Jo Benkow were also in attendance. And in 1996, almost exactly fifty years after the first monument was erected, King Harald V and Queen Sonja gave the park a bust of his father, Olav, thus commemorating all the royal family members who had sought shelter in the forest during the attack.

In a 2005 interview from Aftenposten with King Harald V, he said of the Nybergsund meeting: "Of all the decisions made by the Cabinet, it is the one in Nybergsund on 10 April 1940 that is most important and significant for the Norwegian people in all 100 years of the monarchy."

== Industry ==
Due to its location along the river Trysilelva, Nybergsund has attracted quite a few industries in the area. In 1957, Trysil Interiørtre, a wood processing business, began operations at a plant just across the Nybergsund Bridge on the west bank of Trysilelva. The location was chosen because of the ease of transporting logs downriver. The plant initially produced particle board, but has since changed its production slightly and now produces laminated and veneered components for furniture as well as fire-resistant wall linings for construction.

Another industry that takes advantage of Trysilelva is Sagnfossen Power Plant, located about 15 km (9.3 mi) south of Nybergsund. The Kaplan turbine-based hydroelectric power plant was built in 1945 and now generates 32 GWh (120,000 GJ) of power per year for its owner, Eidsiva vannkraft. The plant is one of three on the Norwegian side of the river.

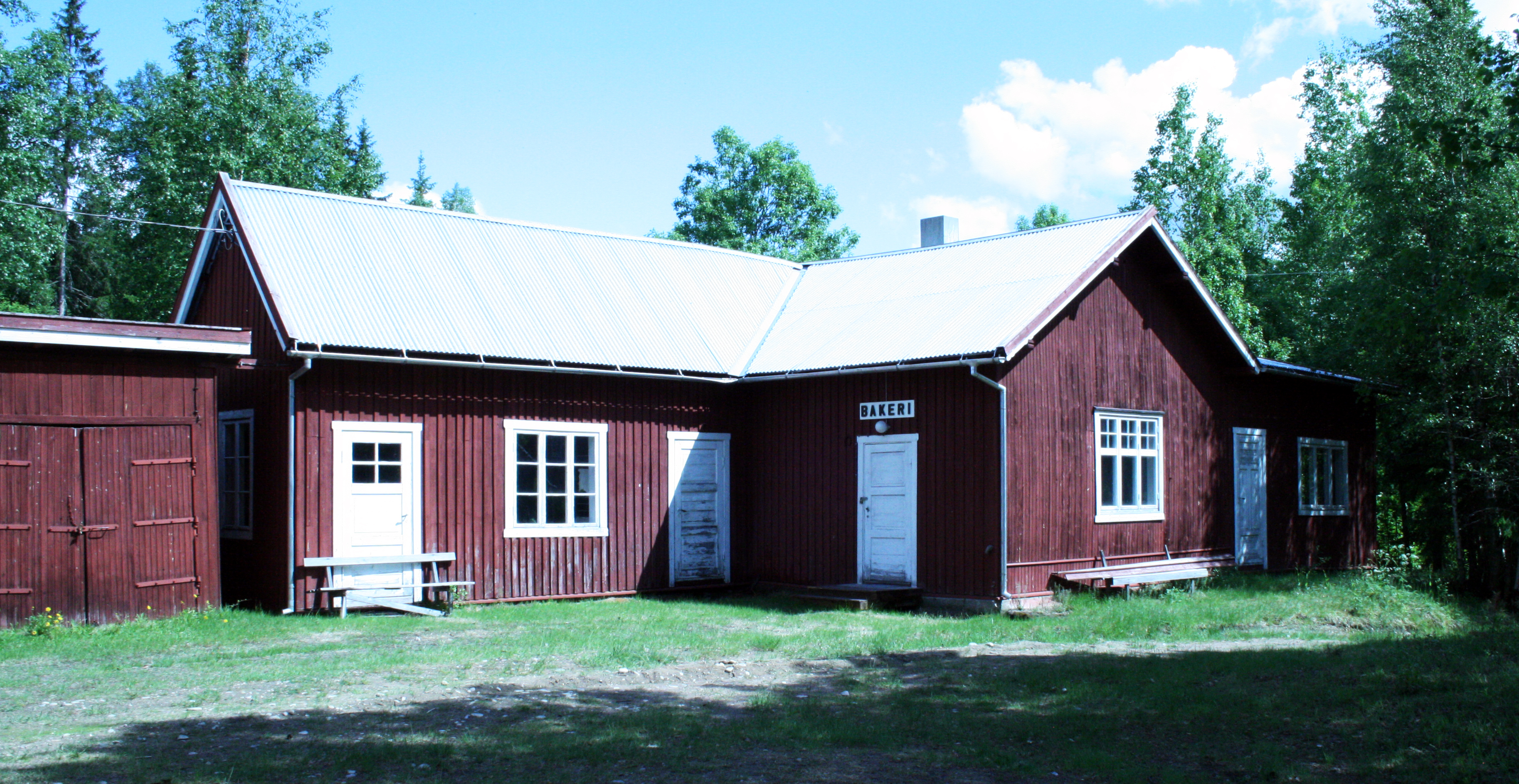
The old bakery building in Nybergsund, now used as part of a museum

In 1997, a small dairy opened up in Nybergsund called TINE Meieriet Trysil. The dairy, which specializes in pultost and skjørost, has 13 employees and processes 2.6 million liters (690,000 U.S. gallons) of milk into cheese yearly.

Nybergsund was also home to a bakery that was in operation until the 1980s. The bakery building, located in the village center, has since been turned into part of the Trysil/Engerdal museum, and occasionally holds bakery days where local residents get together and bake traditional recipes.

The village also features some local retail businesses, such as a convenience store, a tailor, an auto repair shop, and a gas station with a post office inside it (post i butikk).

== Transportation ==
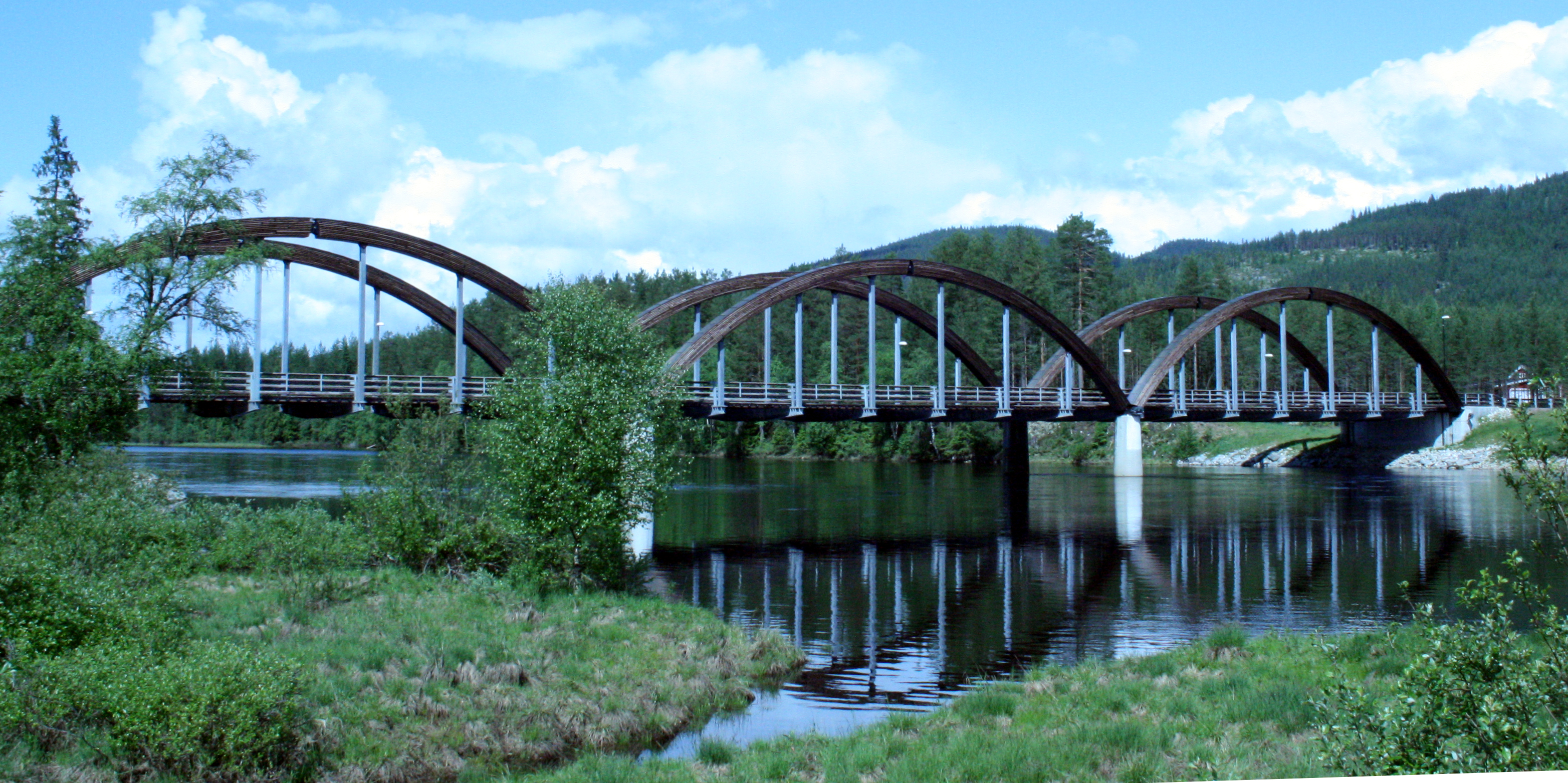
The new Nybergsund Bridge built in 2005

Riksvei 26 is the central road in Nybergsund, extending north towards Innbygda and south towards the Swedish border, where it becomes Riksväg 62. The Norwegian Riksvei 25 lies just north of the village, and it runs east towards the village of Østby and southwest towards the village of Tørberget.

Both roads cross Trysilelva at the newly built Nybergsund Bridge. The original bridge was built of wood in 1929 and then was rebuilt out of steel in 1949. The old bridge was very narrow and traffic could only pass one way at a time, regulated by traffic lights, so in 2004, the Norwegian Public Roads Administration commissioned a new one to be built just north of the old site. The bridge, which was completed on 24 August 2005, cost 19.5 million kroner and uses a wooden arch design. The old bridge is still in operation but has been downgraded to a municipal road.

The village is also served by a local bus route, Trysilekspressen (The Trysil Express). The service, managed by Boreal Transport, runs busses between Trysil and Oslo several times per day.

== Recreation ==
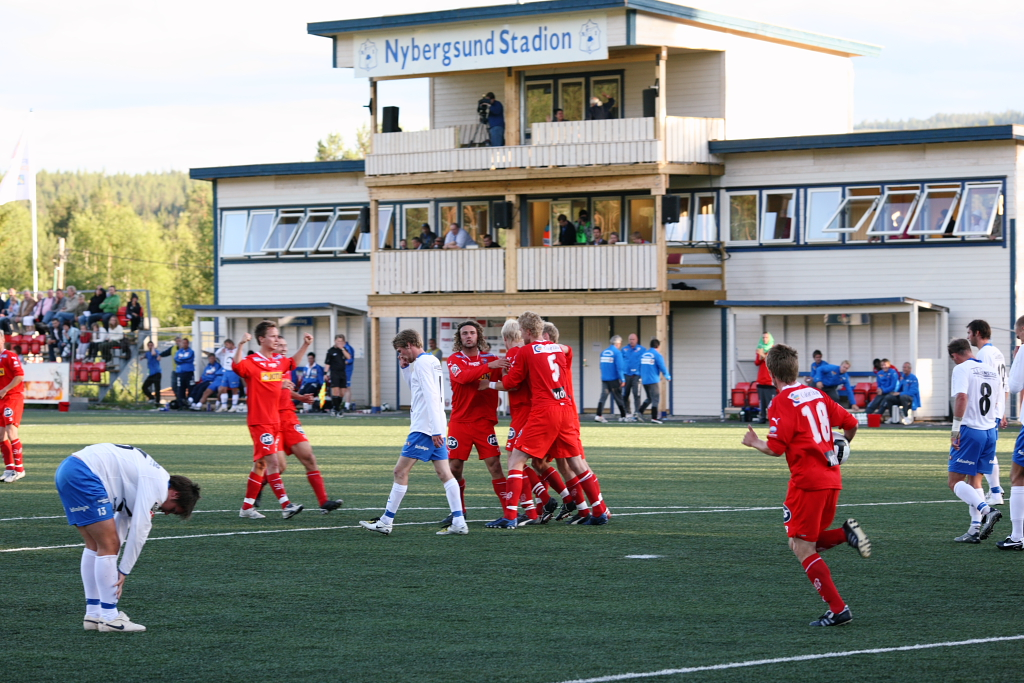
Nybergsund I.F. playing against Sandefjord Fotball at Nybergsund Stadion

The village has a local football team, Nybergsund I.L., that was founded in 1918. It currently plays in the Norwegian Second Division, having been relegated from Adeccoligaen in 2011. They play at Nybergsund Stadion on Idrettsvegen. The stadium features artificial turf and seating for up to 1,500 spectators. Aside from the stadium, there are also sports facilities at the local Nybergsund School, including a small football field, basketball court, and skateboard ramp.

There are many marked hiking trails in the area that lead up to local mountains such as Klank, which rises to 650 m (2,130 ft) above sea level at its peak. During the summer, the bathing area at the lake Tjønna is very popular, with public facilities such as picnic tables, changing rooms, bathrooms, and a beach volleyball court. On the west side of Trysilelva there is Trysil Skytterlag, a shooting range with a covered firing point. The village also has a community center that regularly hosts events such as bingo and concerts.

Trysilfjellet mountain and the associated ski resort owned by Skistar is also very close to Nybergsund, lying just 7 km (4.3 mi) to the northwest. The ski resort is the largest in Norway, featuring 31 lifts and 66 different slopes. The resort is popular mainly because of its relatively close proximity to Oslo, with about two and a half hours of travel time by car each way.
