= Østby, Innlandet =

Village in Trysil Municipality, Norway

Østby
- Village
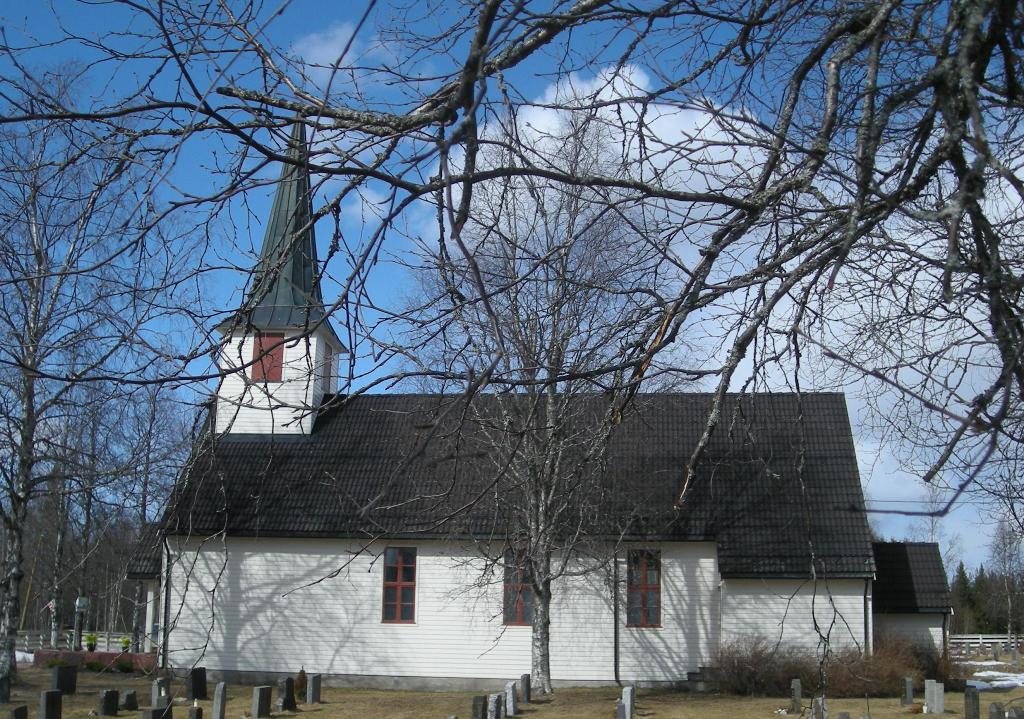
- Østby church
- Interactive map of Østby
- Location within Innlandet Location within Norway
- Coordinates: 61.254°N 12.52688°E
- Country: Norway
- Region: Eastern Norway
- County: Innlandet
- District: Østerdalen
- Municipality: Trysil Municipality

Area
  - Total: 0.44 km^{2} (0.17 sq mi)
- Elevation: 482 m (1,581 ft)

Population (2003)
  - Total: 205
  - Density: 466/km^{2} (1,210/sq mi)
- Time zone: UTC+01:00 (CET)
  - Summer (DST): UTC+02:00 (CEST)
- Post Code: 2423 Østby

Østby is a village in Trysil Municipality in Innlandet county, Norway. The village lies about 20 kilometres (12 mi) to the southeast of the village of Innbygda and about 15 kilometres (9.3 mi) west of the border with Sweden.

The 0.44-square-kilometre (110-acre) village had a population (2003) of 205 and a population density of 466 inhabitants per square kilometre (1,210/sq mi). Since 2003, the population and area data for this village area has not been separately tracked by Statistics Norway. There is still around 200 people living in the village.

In Østby, there is a community house, a supermarket, an abandoned school, and Østby Church. The Kjølen Hotell, which is well known as a training location for cross-country skiing events is located in the village. There are several cross-country skiing tracks of which some are illuminated. Every year the "Trysil Skimaraton" (42195) takes place in Østby, the starting point of which is the hotel. The Norwegian National Road 25 runs through the village.
