= Arvid Nyberg =

Norwegian politician (1928–2022)

Arvid Nyberg (19 May 1928 – 18 January 2022) was a Norwegian politician for the Labour Party.

== Life and career ==
Nyberg was born on 19 May 1928. He served as a deputy representative to the Parliament of Norway from Hedmark during the terms 1973–1977, 1977–1981 and 1981–1985. In total he met during 92 days of parliamentary session. On the local level, Nyberg was the mayor of Trysil Municipality from 1972 to 1999. At that time he was the longest-serving mayor in Norway. He was since surpassed by Henning Myrvang, who was mayor of Sør-Odal Municipality from 1975 to 2007. Nyberg died on 18 January 2022, at the age of 93.
