= Trysil Church =

Church in Innlandet, Norway

- Trysil kirke
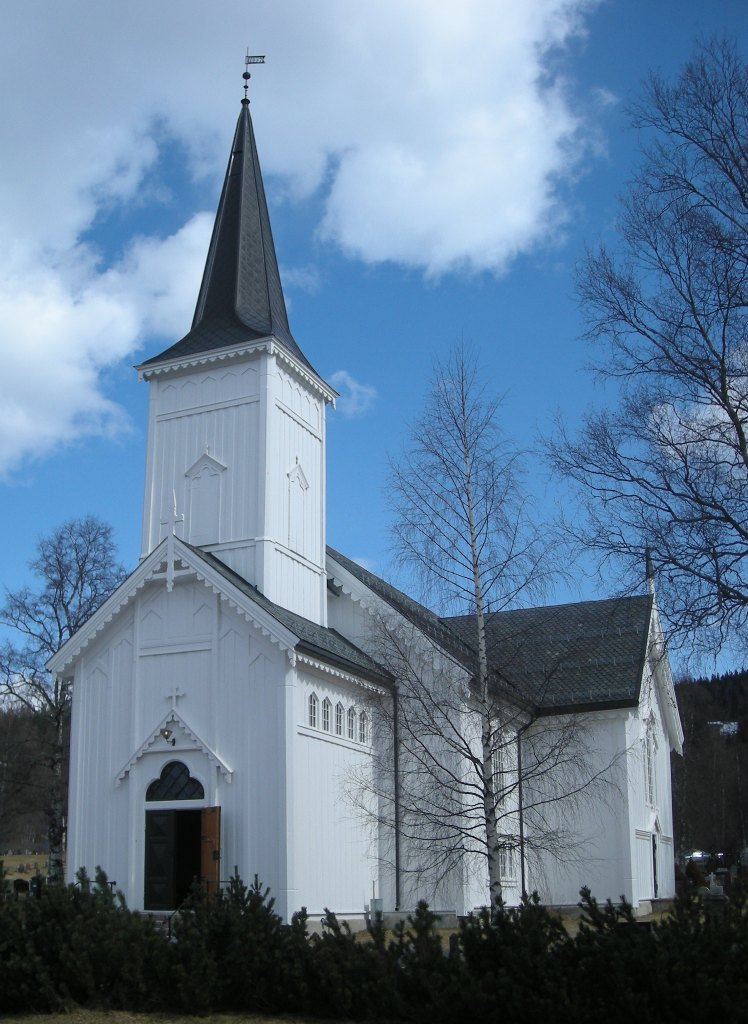
- View of the church
- Trysil Church
- 61°19′01″N 12°15′40″E
- Location: Trysil Municipality, Innlandet
- Country: Norway
- Denomination: Church of Norway
- Previous denomination: Catholic Church
- Churchmanship: Evangelical Lutheran

History
- Status: Parish church
- Founded: 14th century
- Consecrated: 7 July 1861

Architecture
- Functional status: Active
- Architect: Christian Heinrich Grosch
- Architectural type: Cruciform
- Completed: 1861 (165 years ago)

Specifications
- Capacity: 560
- Materials: Wood

Administration
- Diocese: Hamar bispedømme
- Deanery: Sør-Østerdal prosti
- Parish: Trysil
- Norwegian Cultural Heritage Site
- Type: Church
- Status: Protected
- ID: 85675

Trysil Church (Norwegian: Trysil kirke) is a parish church of the Church of Norway in Trysil Municipality in Innlandet county, Norway. It is located in the village of Innbygda. It is the church for the Trysil parish which is part of the Sør-Østerdal prosti (deanery) in the Diocese of Hamar. The white, wooden church was built in a cruciform design in 1861 using plans drawn up by the architect Christian Heinrich Grosch. The church seats about 560 people.

== History ==
The first church in Trysil was likely a wooden stave church that may have been built in the 14th century. In 1563, the church was looted by the Swedish Army during the Northern Seven Years' War. The Swedes took all of the valuable, historic items in the church. In 1749, the old church was torn down. A new timber-framed cruciform church was built on the same site, being completed in 1750. It was consecrated in 1750.

In 1814, this church served as an election church (Norwegian: valgkirke). Together with more than 300 other parish churches across Norway, it was a polling station for elections to the 1814 Norwegian Constituent Assembly which wrote the Constitution of Norway. This was Norway's first national elections. Each church parish was a constituency that elected people called "electors" who later met together in each county to elect the representatives for the assembly that was to meet at Eidsvoll Manor later that year.

By the 1850s, the church was considered to be too small and in need of replacement. In 1855, Christian Heinrich Grosch submitted designs for the new church that would be built a few meters to the north of the old church. It was difficult to find a builder, but eventually they hired Thomas Aasen who had built the Vallset Church. During the summer of 1857, however, Aasen and his workers had great difficulty in getting the tower to stand straight, so the parish relieved him of his duty and gave the job to Ole Lysvig, who completed the half-finished church. The church was consecrated on 7 July 1861. The old church was demolished the following year in 1862. Interestingly, there were problems with the structure of the tower about one year after the building was completed. The church was extensively restored in 1950.

== Media gallery ==
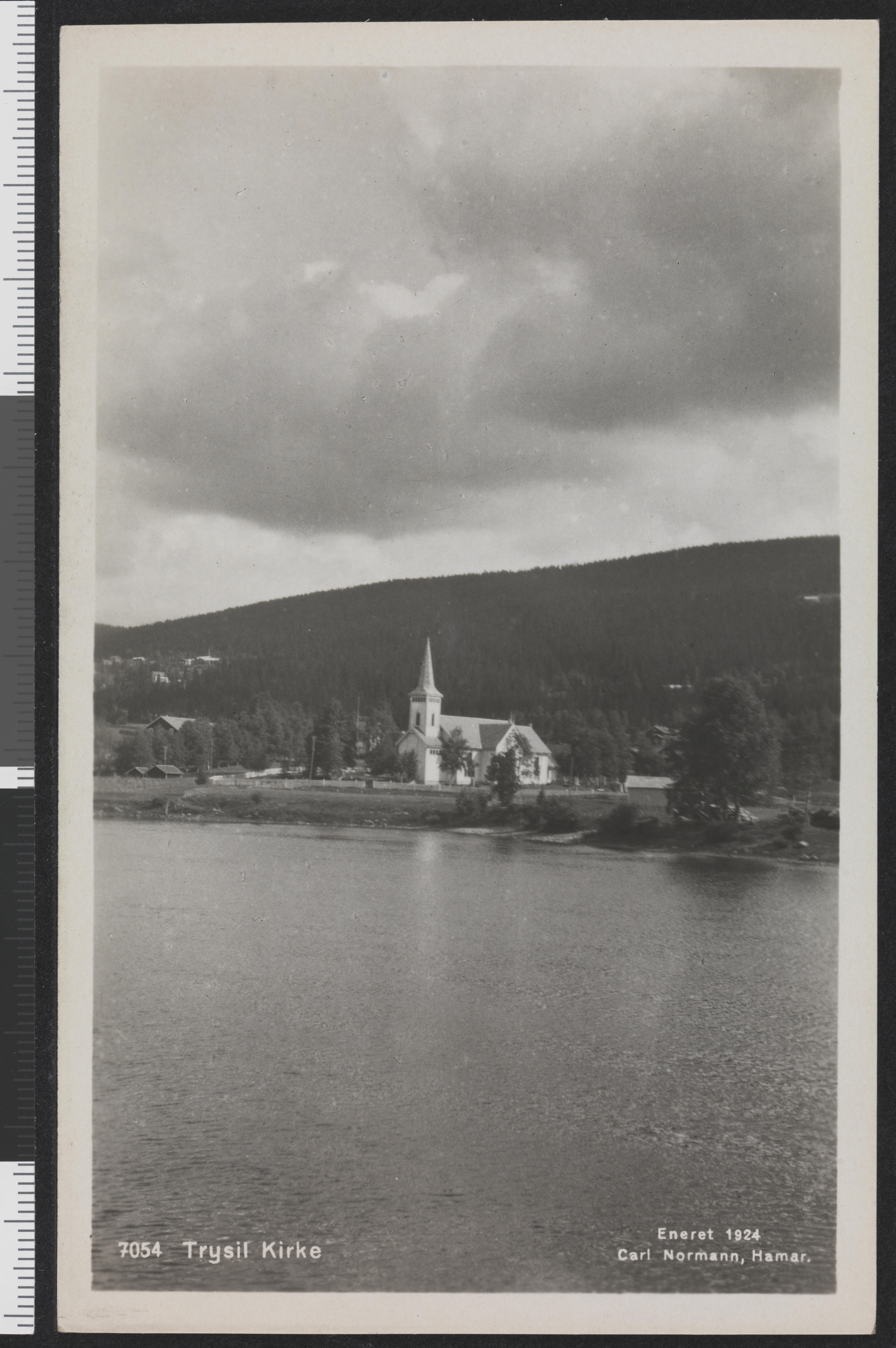

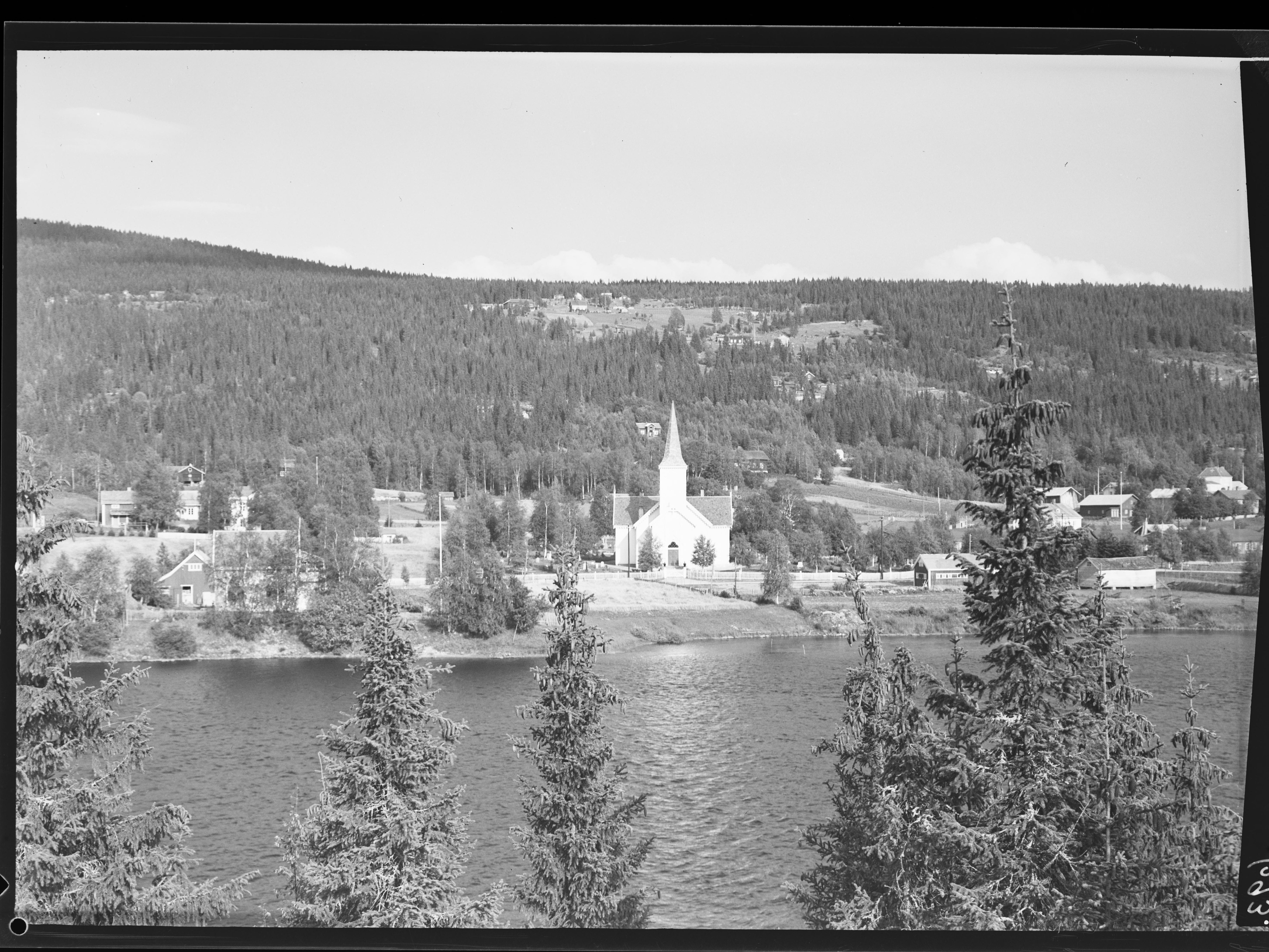

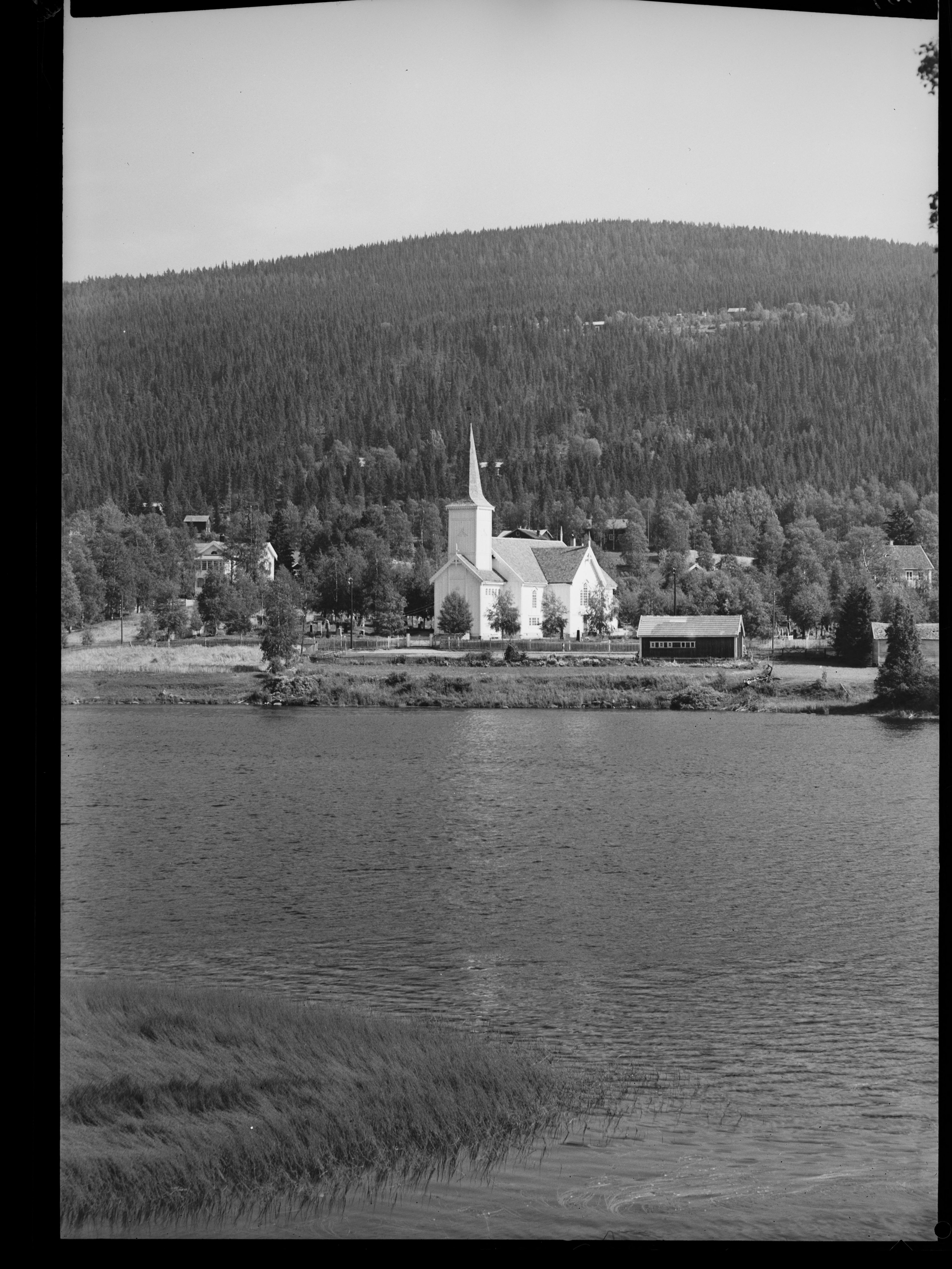

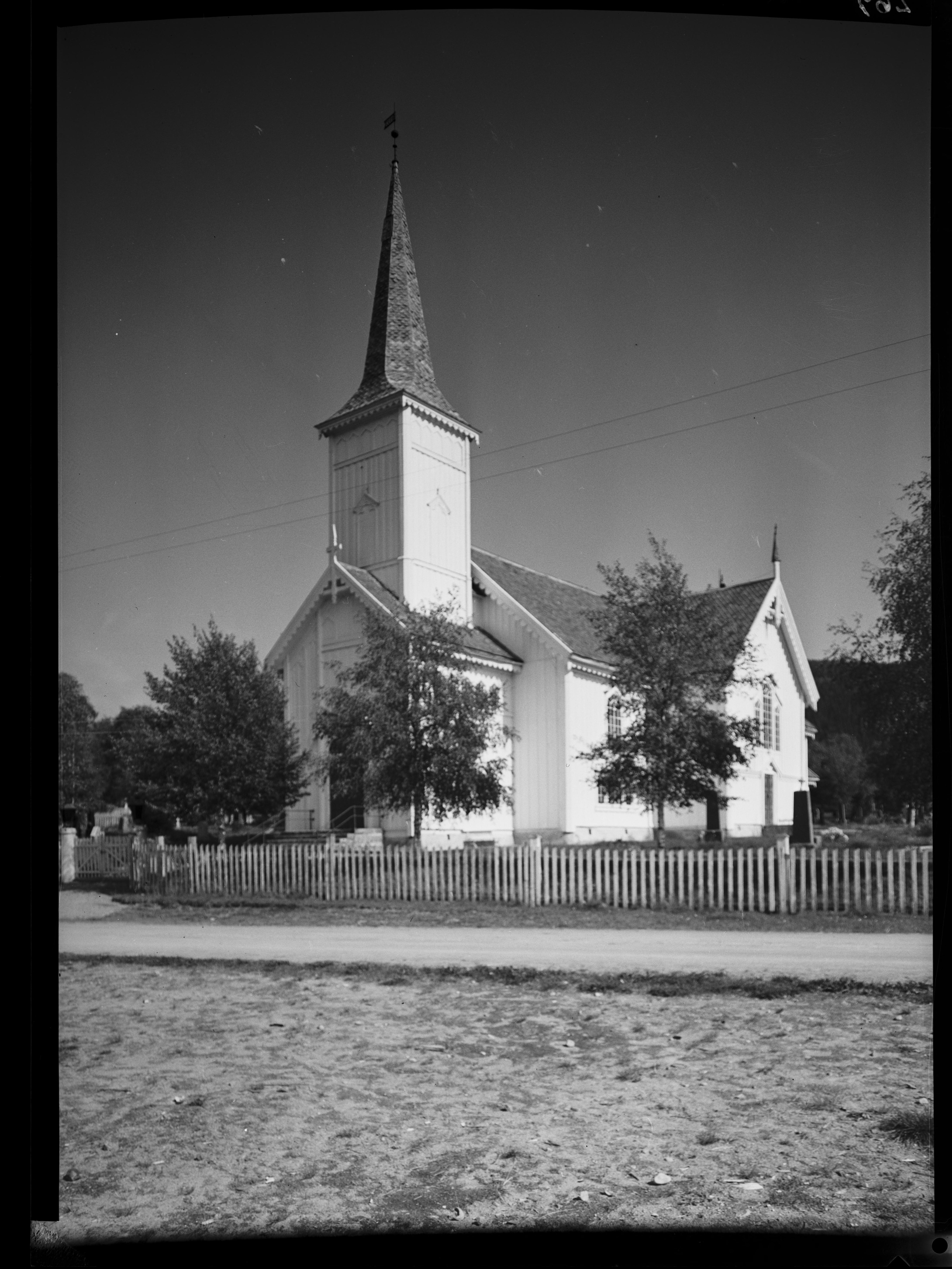

== See also ==
- List of churches in Hamar
