= Ljørdalen Church =

Church in Innlandet, Norway

- Ljørdalen kirke
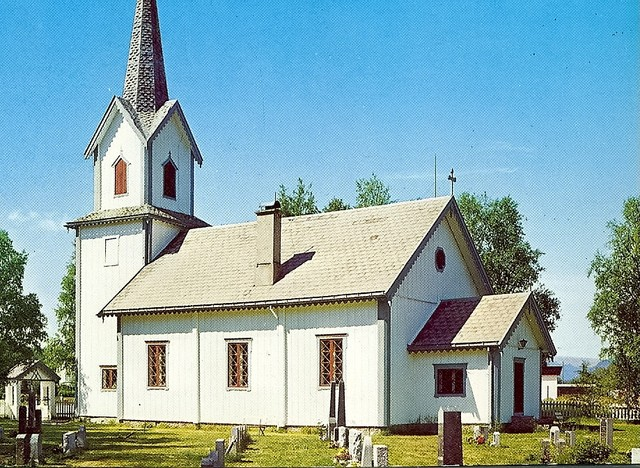
- View of the church
- Ljørdalen Church
- 61°23′02″N 12°41′08″E
- Location: Trysil Municipality, Innlandet
- Country: Norway
- Denomination: Church of Norway
- Churchmanship: Evangelical Lutheran

History
- Status: Parish church
- Founded: 1872
- Consecrated: 1872

Architecture
- Functional status: Active
- Architect: Local villagers
- Architectural type: Rectangular
- Completed: 1872 (154 years ago)

Specifications
- Capacity: 200
- Materials: Wood

Administration
- Diocese: Hamar bispedømme
- Deanery: Sør-Østerdal prosti
- Parish: Ljørdalen
- Norwegian Cultural Heritage Site
- Type: Church
- Status: Not protected
- ID: 84315

Ljørdalen Church (Norwegian: Ljørdalen kirke) is a parish church of the Church of Norway in Trysil Municipality in Innlandet county, Norway. It is located in the village of Ljørdalen. It is the church for the Ljørdalen parish which is part of the Sør-Østerdal prosti (deanery) in the Diocese of Hamar. The white, wooden church was built in a rectangular design in 1872 using plans drawn up by the local villagers. The church seats about 200 people.

== History ==
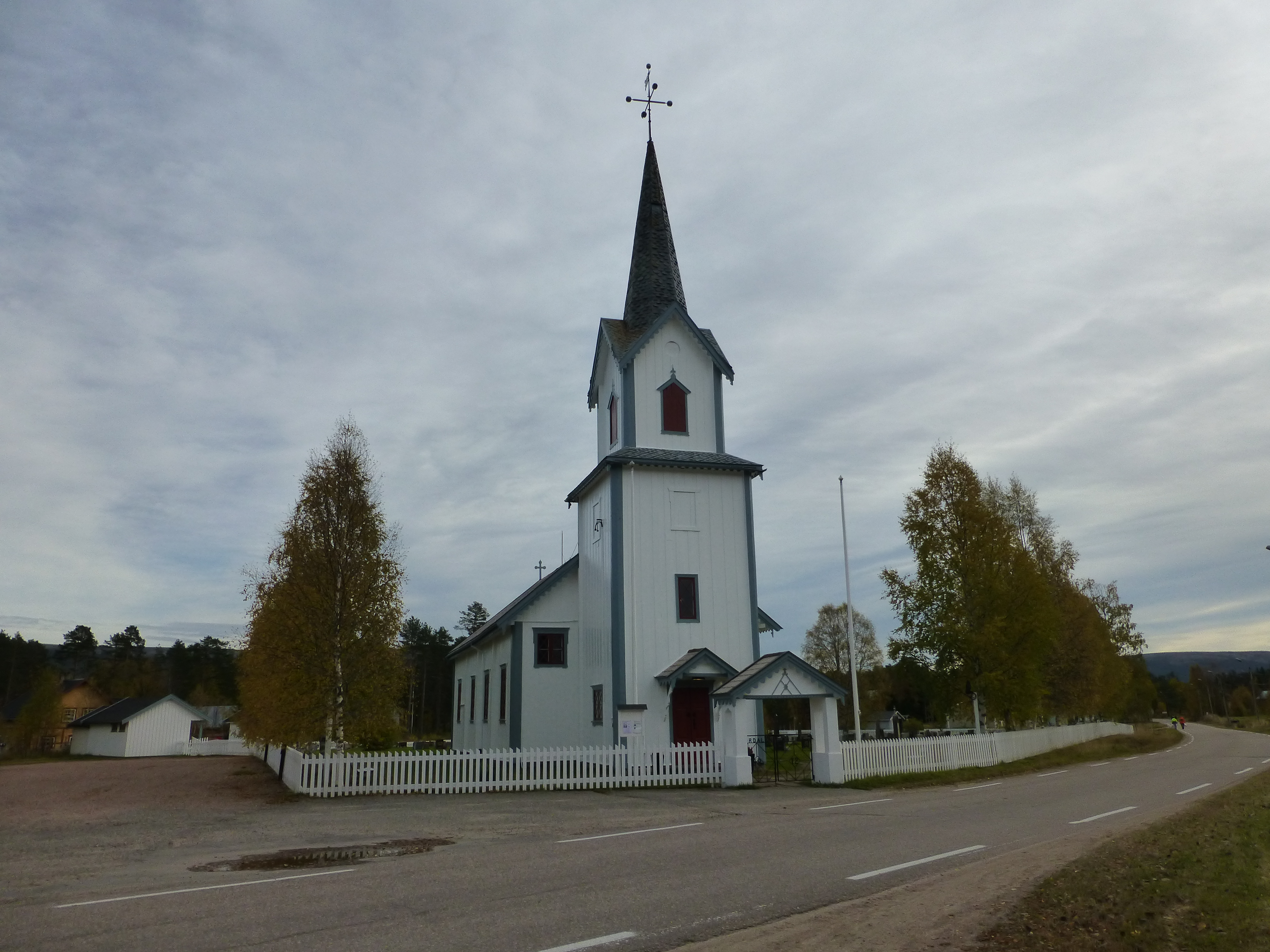
View of the church

The Ljørdalen valley runs along the border with Sweden, and it is a good distance to the main church in Trysil, so by the mid-1800s, the people of the Ljørdalen valley were asking for their own church. After permission was received, a group of local villagers designed and built the church. It was consecrated in 1872. In 1980, the church was renovated and enlarged, adding spaces for kids, a small kitchen, and a bathroom.

== See also ==
- List of churches in Hamar
