= Tørberget Church =

Church in Innlandet, Norway

- Tørberget kirke
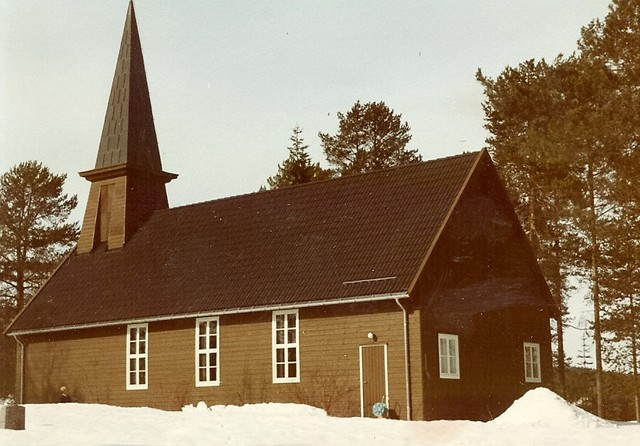
- View of the church
- Tørberget Church
- 61°08′04″N 12°06′33″E
- Location: Trysil Municipality, Innlandet
- Country: Norway
- Denomination: Church of Norway
- Churchmanship: Evangelical Lutheran

History
- Status: Parish church
- Founded: 1933
- Consecrated: 19 March 1933

Architecture
- Functional status: Active
- Architect: Statens bygningsinspektør
- Architectural type: Long church
- Completed: 1933 (93 years ago)

Specifications
- Capacity: 150
- Materials: Wood

Administration
- Diocese: Hamar bispedømme
- Deanery: Sør-Østerdal prosti
- Parish: Tørberget
- Norwegian Cultural Heritage Site
- Type: Church
- Status: Protected
- ID: 85706

Tørberget Church (Norwegian: Tørberget kirke) is a parish church of the Church of Norway in Trysil Municipality in Innlandet county, Norway. It is located in the village of Tørberget. It is the church for the Tørberget parish which is part of the Sør-Østerdal prosti (deanery) in the Diocese of Hamar. The brown, wooden church was built in a long church design in 1933 using plans drawn up by the Statens bygningsinspektør architect. The church seats about 150 people.

== History ==
Planning for a new church in Tørberget began in the 1920s. A cemetery was established on the site on 3 August 1924. Soon after, people began pushing for a chapel to be built on the same site. The designs were drawn up by the Statens bygningsinspektør, the governmental building office which oversaw construction projects. The lead builders were Harald Brænd and Gj. Floden. Originally designed to be an annex chapel, the building was consecrated on 19 March 1933 with Crown Prince Olav and Crown Princess Märtha present. The event was marked with a plaque in front of the sacristy with the throne and the letters O and M on top. The building underwent a major restoration in 1977. In 1996, the chapel was upgraded to parish church status and at that time it was renamed as a church.

== See also ==
- List of churches in Hamar
