= Østby Church =

Church in Innlandet, Norway

- Østby kirke
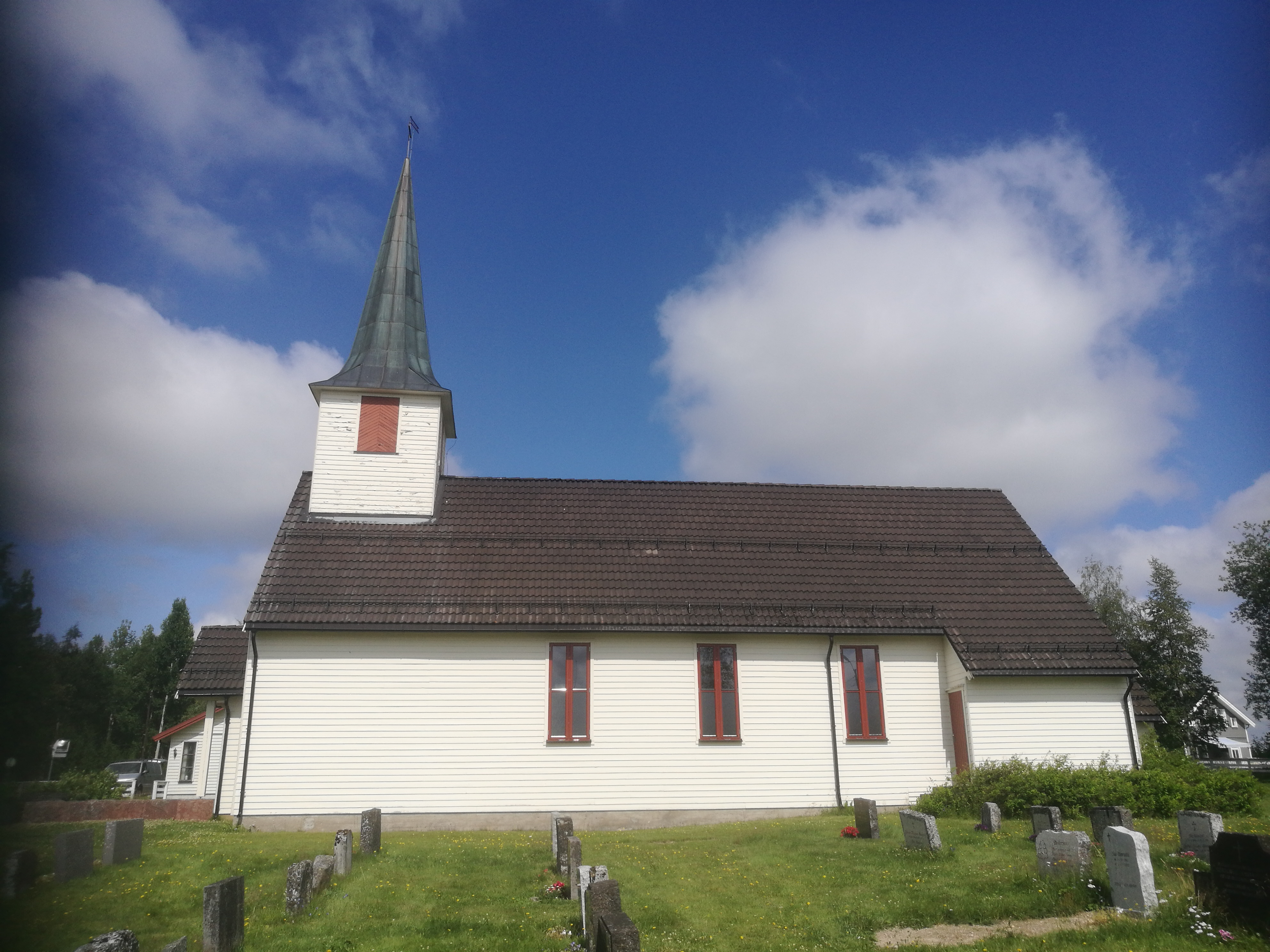
- View of the church
- Østby Church
- 61°15′20″N 12°31′50″E
- Location: Trysil Municipality, Innlandet
- Country: Norway
- Denomination: Church of Norway
- Churchmanship: Evangelical Lutheran

History
- Status: Parish church
- Founded: 1940
- Consecrated: 1940

Architecture
- Functional status: Active
- Architect: Statsbygg
- Architectural type: Long church
- Completed: 1940 (86 years ago)

Specifications
- Capacity: 100
- Materials: Wood

Administration
- Diocese: Hamar bispedømme
- Deanery: Sør-Østerdal prosti
- Parish: Østby
- Norwegian Cultural Heritage Site
- Type: Church
- Status: Not protected
- ID: 85911

Østby Church (Norwegian: Østby kirke) is a parish church of the Church of Norway in Trysil Municipality in Innlandet county, Norway. It is located in the village of Østby, about 15 kilometres (9.3 mi) from the border with Sweden. It is the church for the Østby parish which is part of the Sør-Østerdal prosti (deanery) in the Diocese of Hamar. The white, wooden church was built in a long church design in 1940 using plans drawn up by the Norwegian Directorate of Public Construction and Property. The church seats about 100 people.

== History ==
The church was originally built as an annex chapel. The Norwegian Directorate of Public Construction and Property designed the building. Later, the chapel was upgraded to the status of parish church and it was renamed as a church.

== Media gallery ==
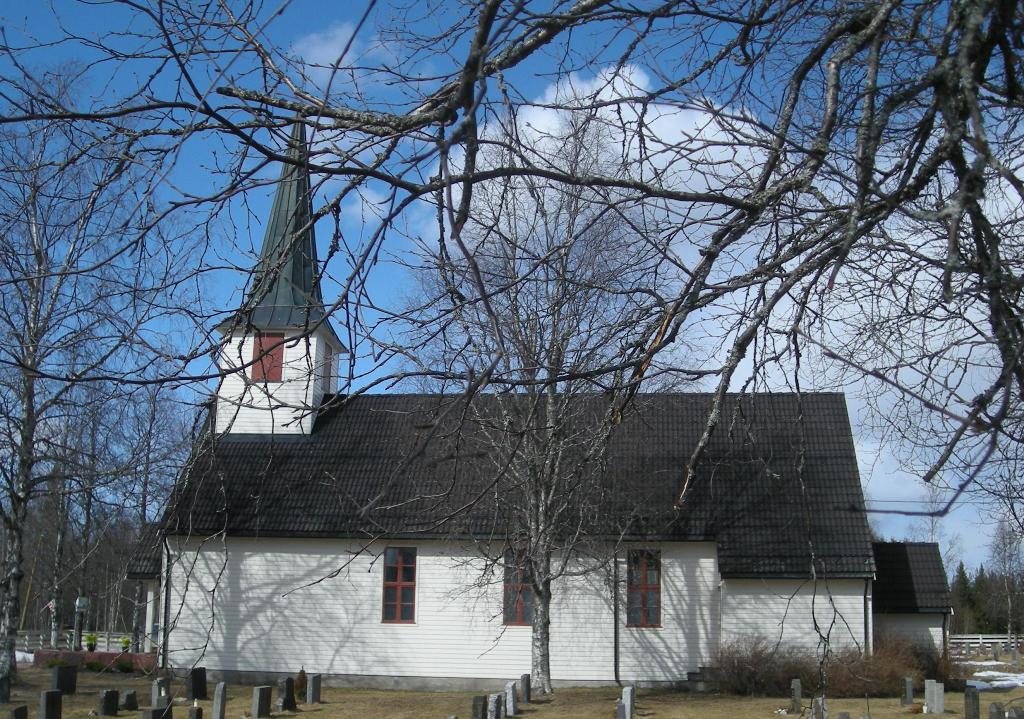

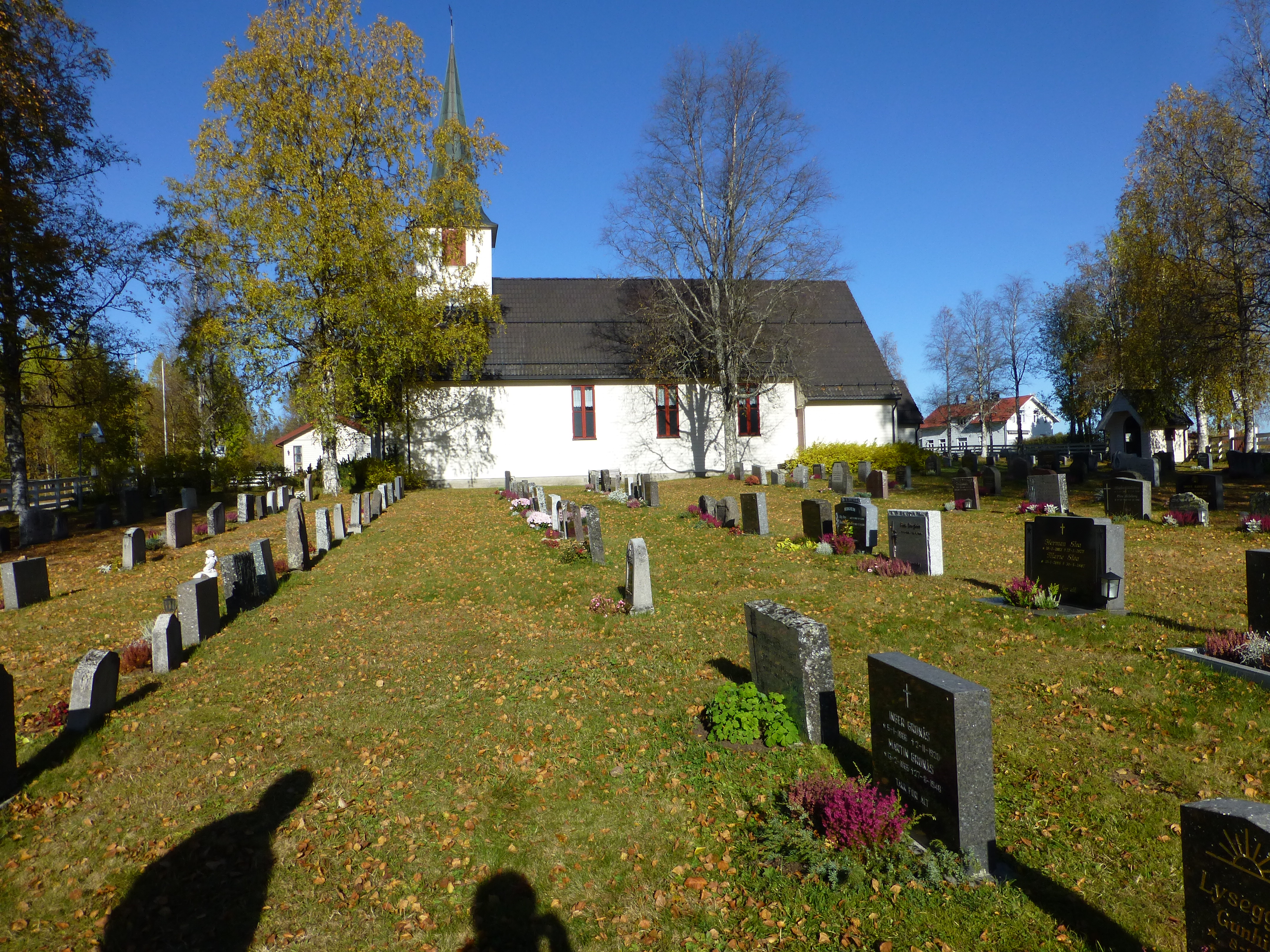

== See also ==
- List of churches in Hamar
