= Axel Smith (topographer) =

Norwegian topographer (1744–1823)

Axel Christian Smith (8 May 1744 – 20 June 1823) was a Norwegian priest and topographer.

He was born in Stavanger as a son of merchant Anders (Andreas) Smith (1716–1772) and his wife Sophia Amalia Prahl (1704–1765). He was married twice; his two wives were sisters. He was a great-grandson of artist Anders Lauritzen Smith and an ancestor of Chief Justice Carsten Smith.

He enrolled at the University of Copenhagen in 1761, and graduated with the cand.theol. degree in 1768. He returned to Norway and worked in Vinger and Elverum before being hired as a curate in Elverum and Trysil in 1773. During his time, there was a significant growth of forestry in Trysil, and the area became a parish of its own in 1780. He is also credited with bringing the potato to the district. In 1785 he penned the topographical-economical work Beskrivelse over Trysild Præstegjeld i Aggershuus Stift i Norge. Even in modern times this has been used as a historical source. It was printed in two parts in 1796 and 1798. By that time, however, Smith had become vicar at Elverum Church and dean of Østerdalen prosti (deanery), in 1787. From 1795 to his death he was the vicar at Øyestad Church.
