= Søre Osen Church =

Church in Innlandet, Norway

- Søre Osen kirke
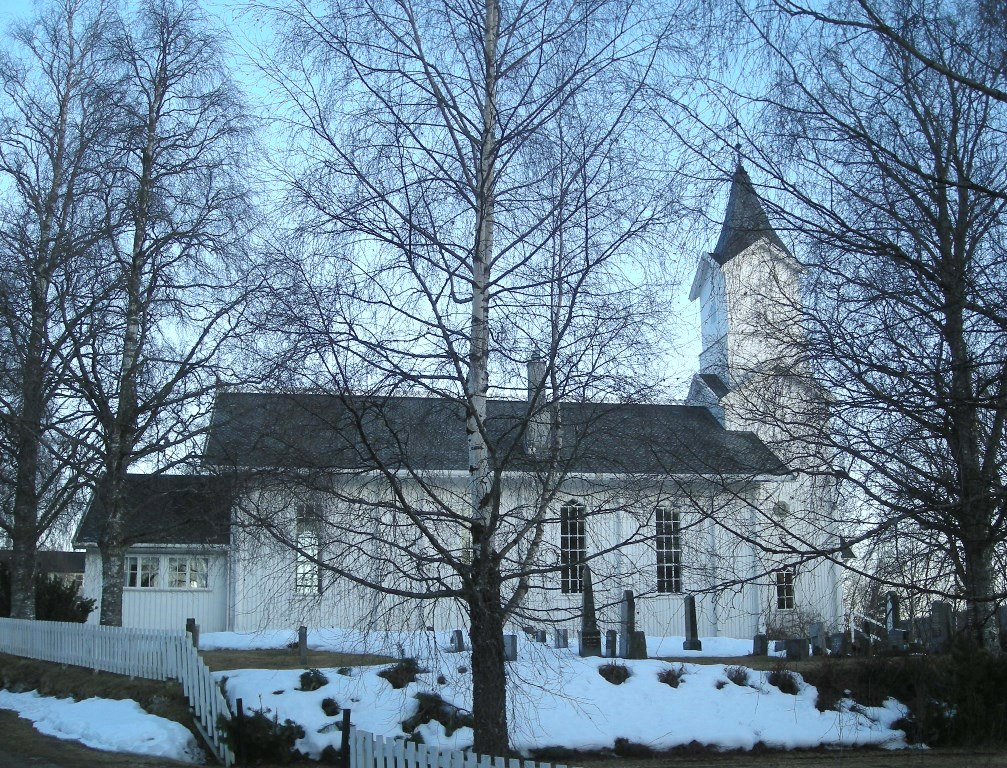
- View of the church
- Søre Osen Church
- 61°10′22″N 11°54′52″E
- Location: Trysil Municipality, Innlandet
- Country: Norway
- Denomination: Church of Norway
- Churchmanship: Evangelical Lutheran

History
- Former name: Søndre Osen kirke
- Status: Parish church
- Founded: 1882
- Consecrated: 22 November 1882

Architecture
- Functional status: Active
- Architect: Th. Berg
- Architectural type: Long church
- Completed: 1882 (144 years ago)

Specifications
- Capacity: 220
- Materials: Wood

Administration
- Diocese: Hamar bispedømme
- Deanery: Sør-Østerdal prosti
- Parish: Søre Osen
- Norwegian Cultural Heritage Site
- Type: Church
- Status: Not protected
- ID: 85043

Søre Osen Church (Norwegian: Søre Osen kirke) is a parish church of the Church of Norway in Trysil Municipality in Innlandet county, Norway. It is located in the village of Søre Osen. It is the church for the Søre Osen parish which is part of the Sør-Østerdal prosti (deanery) in the Diocese of Hamar. The white, wooden church was built in a long church design in 1882 using plans drawn up by the architect Th. Berg. The church seats about 220 people.

== History ==
The people of Søre Osen had long been wanting a church closer to their homes. After a fatal accident while some people were traveling to church in 1864, work for a new church began in earnest. A new cemetery in Søre Osen was consecrated on 3 April 1878. A few years later, a new church was built on the site. The building was designed by Th. Berg and built by builder Hans Øverby. Construction began in 1880 and it was completed in 1882. The new building was consecrated on 22 November 1882. The church was unpainted on the outside until 1907. In 1959, the original sacristy was torn down and a new, larger one was built in the same location adjacent to the choir.

== See also ==
- List of churches in Hamar
