= Jordet =

Jordet is a Norwegian surname. Notable people with the surname include:

- Bjørnar Tollan Jordet (born 1986), Norwegian politician and teacher
- Geir Jordet (born 1974), Norwegian professor
- Kirsti Jordet (1932–2019), Norwegian athlete
- Olav Jordet (born 1939), Norwegian former biathlete
