= Innbygda =

- Village
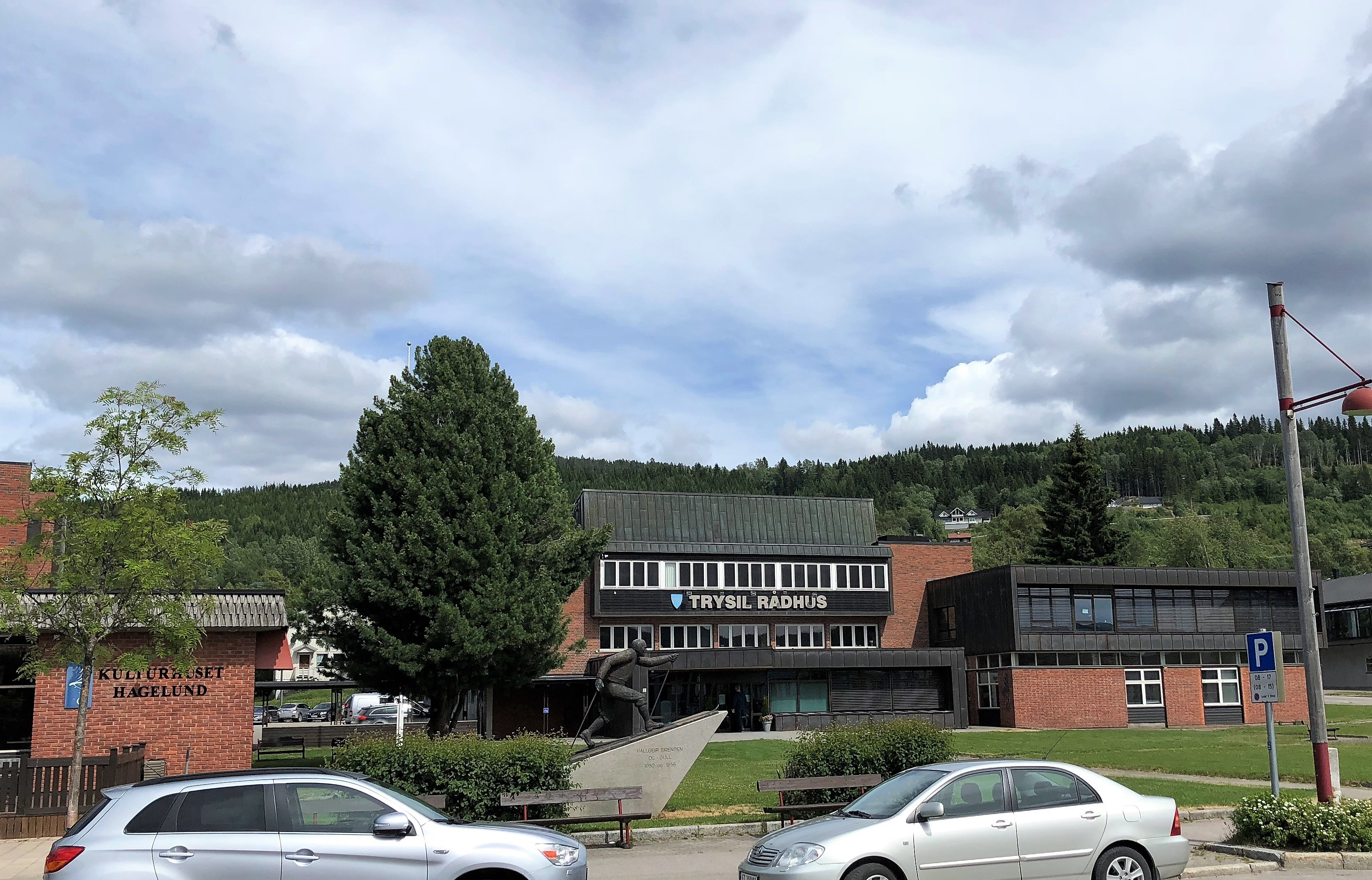
- View of the municipal offices in Innbygda
- Interactive map of Innbygda
- Location within Innlandet Location within Norway
- Coordinates: 61.31485°N 12.2637°E
- Country: Norway
- Region: Eastern Norway
- County: Innlandet
- District: Østerdalen
- Municipality: Trysil Municipality

Area
  - Total: 3.38 km^{2} (1.31 sq mi)
- Elevation: 360 m (1,180 ft)

Population (2024)
  - Total: 2,569
  - Density: 760/km^{2} (2,000/sq mi)
- Time zone: UTC+01:00 (CET)
  - Summer (DST): UTC+02:00 (CEST)
- Post Code: 2420 Trysil

Innbygda is the administrative centre of Trysil Municipality in Innlandet county, Norway. The village is located along the river Trysilelva, about 6 kilometres (3.7 mi) north of the village of Nybergsund. Trysil Church is located in the centre of the village. The village also has several hotels and tourist businesses due to its location near the Trysilfjellet skiing area.

The 3.38-square-kilometre (840-acre) village has a population (2024) of 2,569 and a population density of 760 inhabitants per square kilometre (2,000/sq mi).

== Climate ==
Innbygda has a subarctic climate (Köppen Dfc) with cold winters and warm summers. Mean temperature in January is −10 °C (14 °F) and in July it is 14 °C (57 °F). Precipitation is moderate at 795 millimetres (31.3 in) annually.

Climate data for Trysil-Innbygda (1961-1990) 360m asl, Norway
Month	Jan	Feb	Mar	Apr	May	Jun	Jul	Aug	Sep	Oct	Nov	Dec	Year
Daily mean °C (°F)	−10.0 (14.0)	−9.0 (15.8)	−4.1 (24.6)	1.0 (33.8)	8.1 (46.6)	13.2 (55.8)	14.0 (57.2)	12.5 (54.5)	8.0 (46.4)	3.4 (38.1)	−3.5 (25.7)	−9.0 (15.8)	2.0 (35.7)
Average precipitation mm (inches)	45 (1.8)	37 (1.5)	38 (1.5)	43 (1.7)	67 (2.6)	90 (3.5)	96 (3.8)	89 (3.5)	97 (3.8)	78 (3.1)	66 (2.6)	49 (1.9)	795 (31.3)
