= Femundsmarka National Park =

National park in Norway

- IUCN category II (national park)

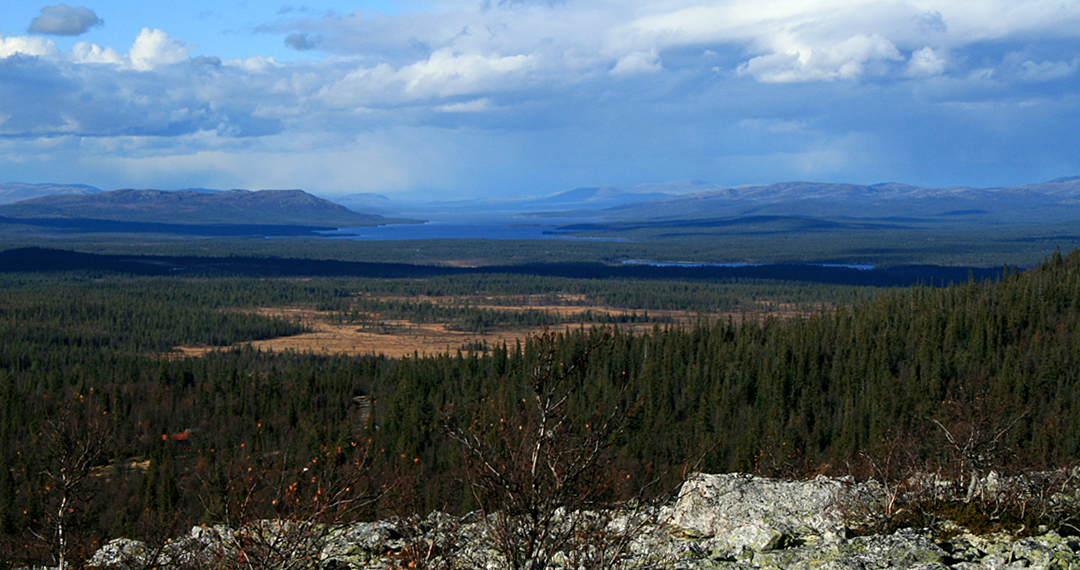
- Interactive map of Femundsmarka National Park
- Location: Innlandet and Trøndelag, Norway
- Nearest city: Røros
- Coordinates: 62°13′N 12°7′E
- Area: 573 km^{2} (221 sq mi)
- Established: 1971
- Governing body: Directorate for Nature Management

Femundsmarka National Park (Norwegian: Femundsmarka nasjonalpark) is a national park in Innlandet and Trøndelag counties in Norway. It is located in Røros Municipality and Engerdal Municipality. The landscape is largely marshes and lakes (it lies adjacent to Norway's second largest natural lake, Femunden). It is a popular destination for canoeing and fishing. The park was formed in 1971 to protect the lake and the forests stretching eastwards to Sweden. The forest is sparse and consists of craggy pine and birch.

== Name ==
The first element is the genitive of the lake name Femund and the last element is the finite form of mark which means "woodland" or "forest".

== Aim of protection ==
Femundsmarka is protected as a national park first and foremost in order to:

- preserve a large, connected and mostly untouched forest covered and montainous area,
- preserve the glacial landforms shaped by dead ice, covered with blockfield, moraines, lakes, and freshwater systems.
- protect the natural biodiversity, with its unique plant- and animal life.

The general public has the right to perform traditional and non-disruptive outdoor activities. Cultural heritage sites are not to be damaged. The area is to be made available to traditional Sami reindeer herding.

In order to take care of the nature and cultural sites of Femundsmarka national park, it's not allowed to collect dead wood. Visitors are only permitted to use twigs for campfires, preferably twigs that are found on the ground. Cycling, horseback riding, flying with drones, and motorised vehicles are also prohibited unless special premits are granted.

== Geology ==
Blockfields in Femundsmarka national park, by lake Volsjøen.

A local myth reads: "It's said that Femundsmarka was the last landscape God created, and by now he'd used all the fertile and good soil, so all he had left was rocks and boulders. When the sun came up on the final day and shone its light over the result of his work, God found it to be a barren and sad land. To make up for the damage, he filled all the holes with water, so that ponds, lakes, and rivers would balance out the sad and grey."

The landscape of Femundsmarka and its neighbouring protected areas, is largely shaped by the last glacial period. During the 100.000 year glacial period, the glacier was at its most 2000 - 3000 meters thick around Femunden. This was one of the final areas to emerge from the melting ice. There was little movement in the glacier here, which in combination with the majority of the rock being arkose - a nutrient poor and hard type of rock that takes long to wither down - means that the glacier didn't as efficiently sand down the landscape underneath as it did in other areas of Scandianavia. On the eastern and northern side of lake Femunden, the glacier moved towards the North-west, as proved by striations.

The characteristic rough, rocky, and nutrient poor landscape of Femundsmarka is known for its blockfields, moraines, included rogen moraines, eskers, and kettles. Rogen moraines, also called ribbed moraines, are named for the protected area of Rogen, which boarders Femundsmarka on the Swedish side of the boarder.

== Biodiversity ==
Femundsmarka is the home of many species connected to old growth forests, large open landscapes, and cold climates. Femundsmarka is located in the western part of the taiga.

The osprey is considered a symbol of the national park, as well as for Engerdal municipality. Femundsmarka is the southernmost Norwegian nesting place of the bar-tailed godwit. The grey-headed chickadee still nests in parts of the park, but the population in southern Norway has declined. The park was a source of falcons for use in the European and Asian sport of falconry and several places in the park are known as Falkfangerhøgda, or "falcon hunters' height". Eagle owls, three-toed woodpeckers, and siberian jays are also characteristic birds of Femundsmarka.

In 1971, small group of 13 muskox split from the original herd in Dovrefjell and migrated to Femundsmarka and Funäsdalen. In 2025 there were at least 10 animals still living in the area.

A reindeer bull in Femundsmarka national park. This is one of the domesticated reindeer belonging to Svahken sijte.

The reindeer grazing in Femundsmarka are free ranging domesticated animals belonging to local Southern Sámi reindeer owners. A group of reindeer owners that manage a common flock is called a Sijte in Southern Sámi, and the sijte represented in Femundsmarka national park are Saanti sijte, Gåebrien sijte, and Svahken sijte. Svahken sijte is the southernmost Sámi reindeer herding district in Norway. Even though domesticated reindeer aren't as shy as wild reindeer, hikers are adviced to be considerate, especially during calving season.

The national park management and the Visitor Centre frequently encourage visitors to use portable twig stoves as an alternative to traditional campfires, to avoid people damaging the dead trees.

Wolf lichens are one of the many species that grow on dead wood. Here from Femundsmarka national park.

Due to many areas of old-growth forest and virgin forests, Femundsmarka houses a lot of threathened species that are connected to dead wood. This includes species of lichens (for example the wolf lichen), fungi, included larch mazegill (Trichaptum laricinum), and insects. Damaging dead trees is therefore prohibited, and instances where visitors have chopped down trees have often been covered in the news in order to shed light on the problem and to encourage visitors to use more sustainable alternatives to traditional campfires, such as portable twig stoves. There have been instances where visitors have been fined for damaging trees, for example in 2021 when a man was fined 10.000 NOK for chopping down five or six pine trees to build a bridge over a larger creek.

With its dry, nutrient poor pine forests, Femundsmarka has seen several natural forest fires. It is therefore also home for pyrophile species that rely on fire ecology for parts of their life cycle. This includes the black fire beetle, Carbonicola lichens, and bohemian geranium.

== Tourism in Femundsmarka National Park ==
Femundsmarka national park is a popular area for hikers and anglers. The Norwegian dog-sledder and hiking enthusiast Lars Monsen has made the park popular through his TV documentaries and books. The three main entryways into the national park are from Synnervika in the North, and from Elgå or Valdalsfjellet in the South. The Norwegian Trekking Association maintain marked trails through the national park, and own the cabin Røvollen within the park as well as the cabin Svukuriset in the boardering landscape protected area of Femundslia.

Femundsmarka national park is know for its many open shelters, most of which are owned and maintained by Statskog. Several of these provide free firewood, in order to avoid visitors damaging the dead trees. Some of the most popular ones are Fautbua, Muggsjøbua, Roastgamma, and Revbua. The shelters are part of the park's cultural heritage.

The visitor centre represents both Femundsmarka and Gutulia national parks, and is located in the hamlet of Elgå in Engerdal municiplaity.

Both Femundsmarka and Gutulia national parks are represented by the Visitor Centre National Park Femundsmarka Gutulia, which is located in the hamlet of Elgå in Engerdal municipality. The visitor centre is authorized and financed by the Norwegian Environment Agency, and is run by INAF, a local foundation. They offer general tourist information, free educational programs for schools and kindergartens, a museum exhibition, a gift shop, and twig stove rental.

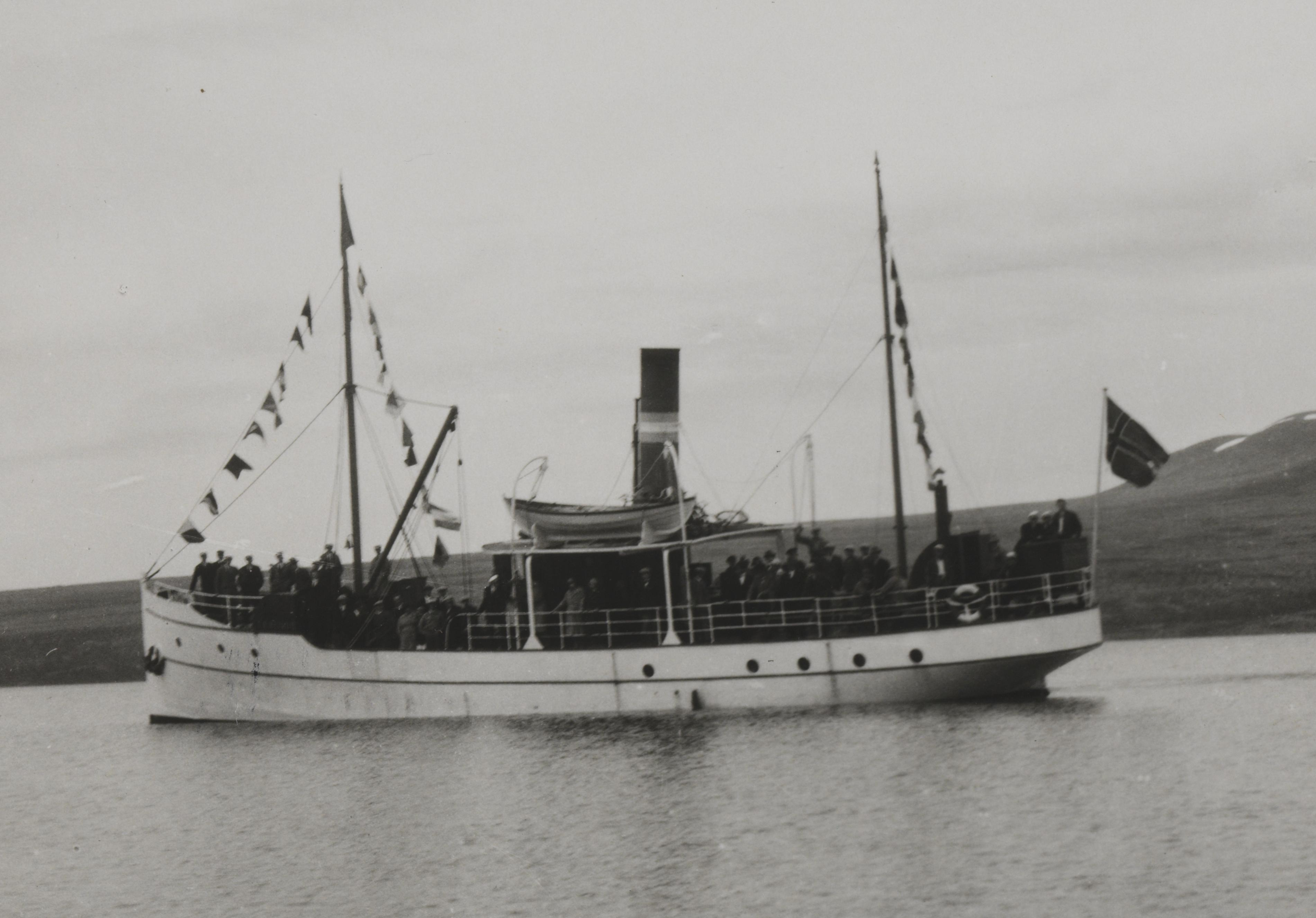
The ferry MS Fæmund II has frequented lake Femunden since 1905.

The ferry MS Fæmund II has frequented lake Femunden since 1905. Originally used for transportation of timber, it's now a popular tourist attraction and a solution for entering or exiting the national park more easily. The ferry has eight ports; Synnervika, Røosen, Femundshytta, Haugen, Jonasvollen, Rævlingen, Elgå and Buvika.

== Femundsmarka in media and popular culture ==
The National Park influenced the name of the album Femundsmarka of the German black metal band Waldgeflüster.
