= Galtsjøen =

Lake in Rendalen, Norway

- Interactive map of the lake
- Location: Rendalen and Engerdal, Innlandet
- Coordinates: 61°53′19″N 11°44′20″E
- Primary inflows: Sølna and Isterfossen
- Primary outflows: Femundelva
- Basin countries: Norway
- Max. length: 2.6 kilometres (1.6 mi)
- Max. width: 1.3 kilometres (0.81 mi)
- Surface area: 3.57 km^{2} (1.38 sq mi)
- Shore length^{1}: 13.22 kilometres (8.21 mi)
- Surface elevation: 643 metres (2,110 ft)
- References: NVE
- ^{1} Shore length is not a well-defined measure.

Galtsjøen is a lake on the border of Rendalen Municipality and Engerdal Municipality in Innlandet county, Norway. The 3.5-square-kilometre (1.4 sq mi) lake is considered the headwaters of the river Femundselva which flows south into Sweden. The lake inlet is through the Galtstrømmen which comes from the small lake Galthåen which in turn has an inlet from the lake Isteren and Femunden. The lake Sølensjøen lies about 2.5 kilometres (1.6 mi) to the west of Galtsjøen.

The lakes Galtsjøen and Galthåen are both part of the Galtsjøen nature reserve. The lake is rich in fish, including trout, grayling, whitefish, pike, burbot, and perch.

== See also ==
- List of lakes in Norway
