= Nedre Roasten =

Lake in Røros, Norway

- Interactive map of the lake
- Location: Engerdal Municipality (Innlandet) and Røros Municipality (Trøndelag)
- Coordinates: 62.3327°N 12.0721°E
- Basin countries: Norway
- Max. length: 2.5 kilometres (1.6 mi)
- Max. width: 800 metres (2,600 ft)
- Surface area: 2.29 km^{2} (0.88 sq mi)
- Shore length^{1}: 13.87 kilometres (8.62 mi)
- Surface elevation: 720 metres (2,360 ft)
- References: NVE
- ^{1} Shore length is not a well-defined measure.

Nedre Roasten is a lake in Femundsmarka National Park on the border of Innlandet and Trøndelag counties in Norway. The 2.29-square-kilometre (0.88 sq mi) lake sits on the border of Engerdal Municipality in Innlandet county and Røros Municipality in Trøndelag county. Nedre Roasten is about 50 kilometres (31 mi) southeast of the town of Røros and just under 9 kilometres (5.6 mi) from the border with Sweden. The lake lies about 5 kilometres (3.1 mi) east of the lake Femunden and about 8 kilometres (5.0 mi) west of the lake Rogen which sits along the Swedish border.

== See also ==
- List of lakes in Norway
