= Engerdal =

Engerdal may refer to:

== Places ==
- Engerdal Municipality, a municipality in Innlandet county, Norway
- Engerdal (village), a village within Engerdal Municipality in Innlandet county, Norway
- Engerdal Church, a church in Engerdal Municipality in Innlandet county, Norway
- Engerdal, Trysil, a small farm area in Trysil Municipality in Innlandet county, Norway

== Other ==
- Engerdal SPK, a sports club based in Engerdal Municipality in Innlandet county, Norway
