= Gutulisjøen =

Lake in Innlandet, Norway

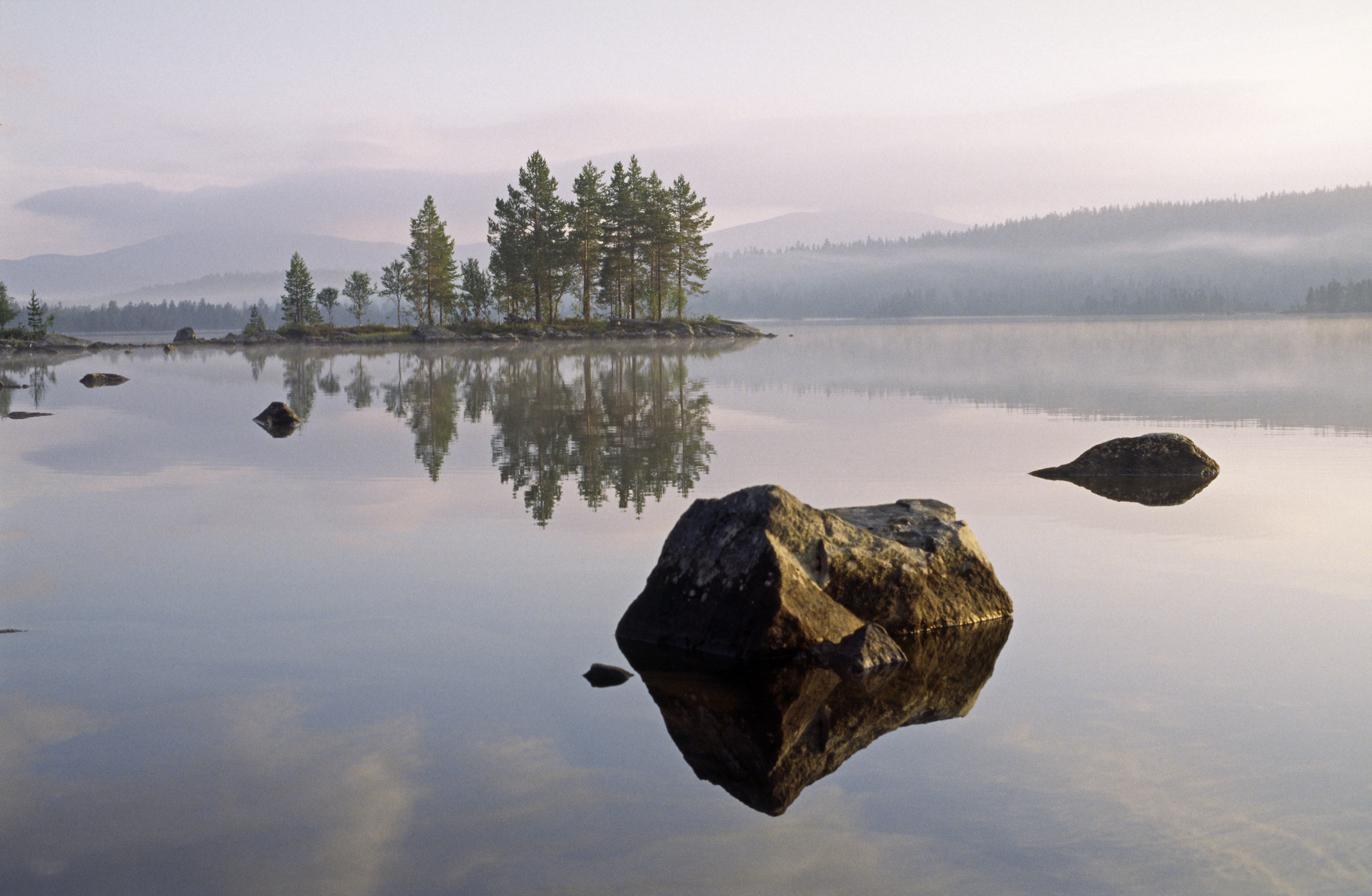
- View of the lake
- Interactive map of the lake
- Location: Engerdal Municipality, Innlandet
- Coordinates: 62°1′25″N 12°8′19″E
- Basin countries: Norway
- Max. length: 3 kilometres (1.9 mi)
- Max. width: 1 kilometre (0.62 mi)
- Surface area: 2.1982 km^{2} (0.8487 sq mi)
- Shore length^{1}: 9.52 kilometres (5.92 mi)
- Surface elevation: 693 metres (2,274 ft)
- References: NVE
- ^{1} Shore length is not a well-defined measure.

Gutulisjøen is a lake in Engerdal Municipality in Innlandet county, Norway. The 2.2-square-kilometre (0.85 sq mi) lake lies along the southwestern border of the Gutulia National Park, about 15 kilometres (9.3 mi) north of the village of Drevsjø.

== See also ==
- List of lakes in Norway
