= Rogen (lake) =

Lake in Trøndelag, Norway

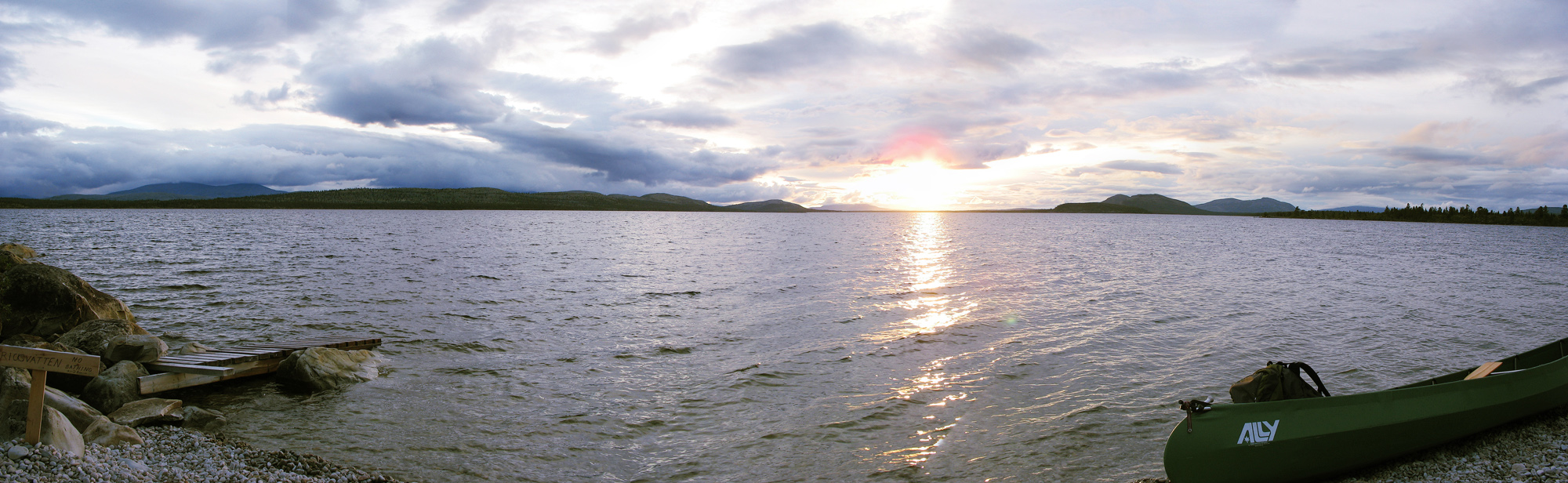
- Interactive map of the lake
- Location: Härjedalen (Sweden) and Trøndelag (Norway)
- Coordinates: 62.3345°N 12.2501°E
- Primary outflows: Klarälven
- Basin countries: Sweden and Norway
- Max. length: 16 kilometres (9.9 mi)
- Max. width: 3.5 kilometres (2.2 mi)
- Surface area: 35.12 km^{2} (13.56 sq mi)
- Surface elevation: 758 metres (2,487 ft)
- References: NVE

Rogen (Swedish and Norwegian) or Rovje (Southern Sami) is a lake on the border of Sweden and Norway. The lake is mostly located in Härjedalen Municipality in Jämtland county in Sweden with a small portion crossing the Norwegian border into Røros Municipality (in Trøndelag county) and Engerdal Municipality (in Innlandet county). The 35.12-square-kilometre (13.56 sq mi) lake is the source of Sweden's longest river, Klarälven.

On the Swedish side of the border, Rogen Nature Reserve is centred around the lake. In Norway, Rogen lies inside Femundsmarka National Park in Røros and Engerdal. The lakes Nedre Roasten and Femunden lie just to the west of Rogen.

== See also ==
- Terminal moraine
- List of glacial moraines
