= Isteren =

Lake in Innlandet, Norway

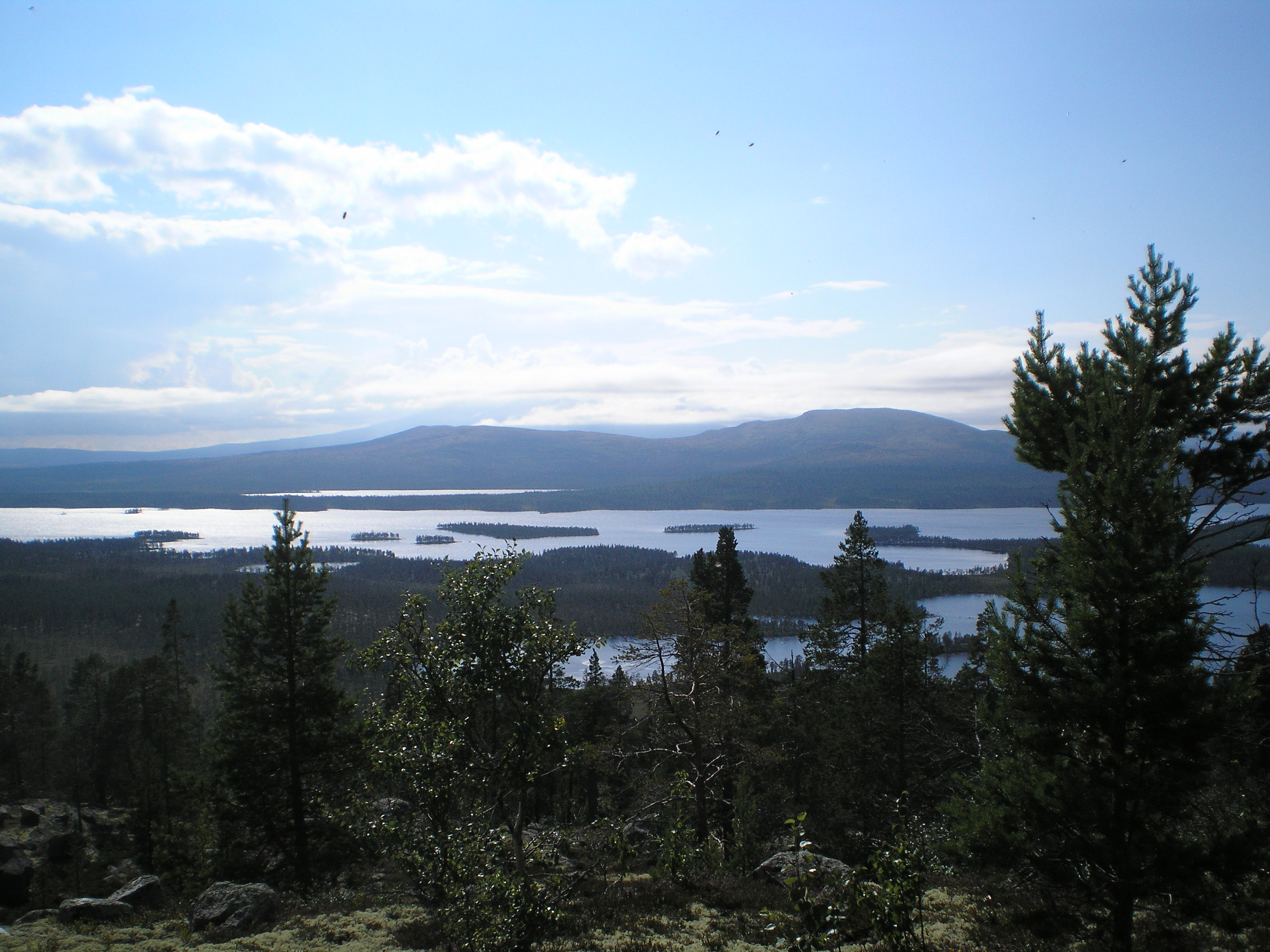
- View of the lake
- Interactive map of the lake
- Location: Engerdal Municipality, Innlandet
- Coordinates: 61°58′N 11°48′E
- Basin countries: Norway
- Max. length: 17 kilometres (11 mi)
- Max. width: 3 kilometres (1.9 mi)
- Surface area: 29.026 km^{2} (11.207 sq mi)
- Max. depth: 20 metres (66 ft)
- Surface elevation: 647 metres (2,123 ft)
- References: NVE

Isteren is a lake in Engerdal Municipality in Innlandet county, Norway. The 29-square-kilometre (11 sq mi) lake lies to the southwest of the large lake Femunden and about 13 kilometres (8.1 mi) northwest of the village of Drevsjø.

Isteren is a lake with a large diversity of species. It is a popular fishing area, and the chances for the good catch is certainly present. In the summer of 2006, a trout weighing 9.25 kilograms (20.4 lb) was caught with a rod from a small boat. It is also rich in whitefish, pike, perch, grayling, burbot and herring. Around the lake there are two fish mounds and some single cabins.

The river Sømåa, originating from lake Langsjøen, flows into Isteren from the north. It is a river with a rich bird life, especially in the spring. Here one can observe rare species of migrating birds.

== See also ==
- List of lakes in Norway
