= Sorken =

Village in Engerdal Municipality, Norway

- Village
- Interactive map of Sorken
- Location within Innlandet Location within Norway
- Coordinates: 61.97142°N 11.94453°E
- Country: Norway
- Region: Eastern Norway
- County: Innlandet
- District: Østerdalen
- Municipality: Engerdal Municipality
- Elevation: 667 m (2,188 ft)

Population (1999)
  - Total: 235
- Time zone: UTC+01:00 (CET)
  - Summer (DST): UTC+02:00 (CEST)
- Post Code: 2443 Drevsjø

Sorken is a village in Engerdal Municipality in Innlandet county, Norway. It is located on the southeastern shore of the large lake Femunden, about 14 kilometres (8.7 mi) west of the border with Sweden. The village of Drevsjø lies about 10 kilometres (6.2 mi) to the southeast of Sorken.

Its population in 1999 was 235, but since 2001 it is not considered an urban settlement by Statistics Norway, and its data is therefore not tracked anymore.
