= Vurrusjøen =

Lake in Innlandet, Norway

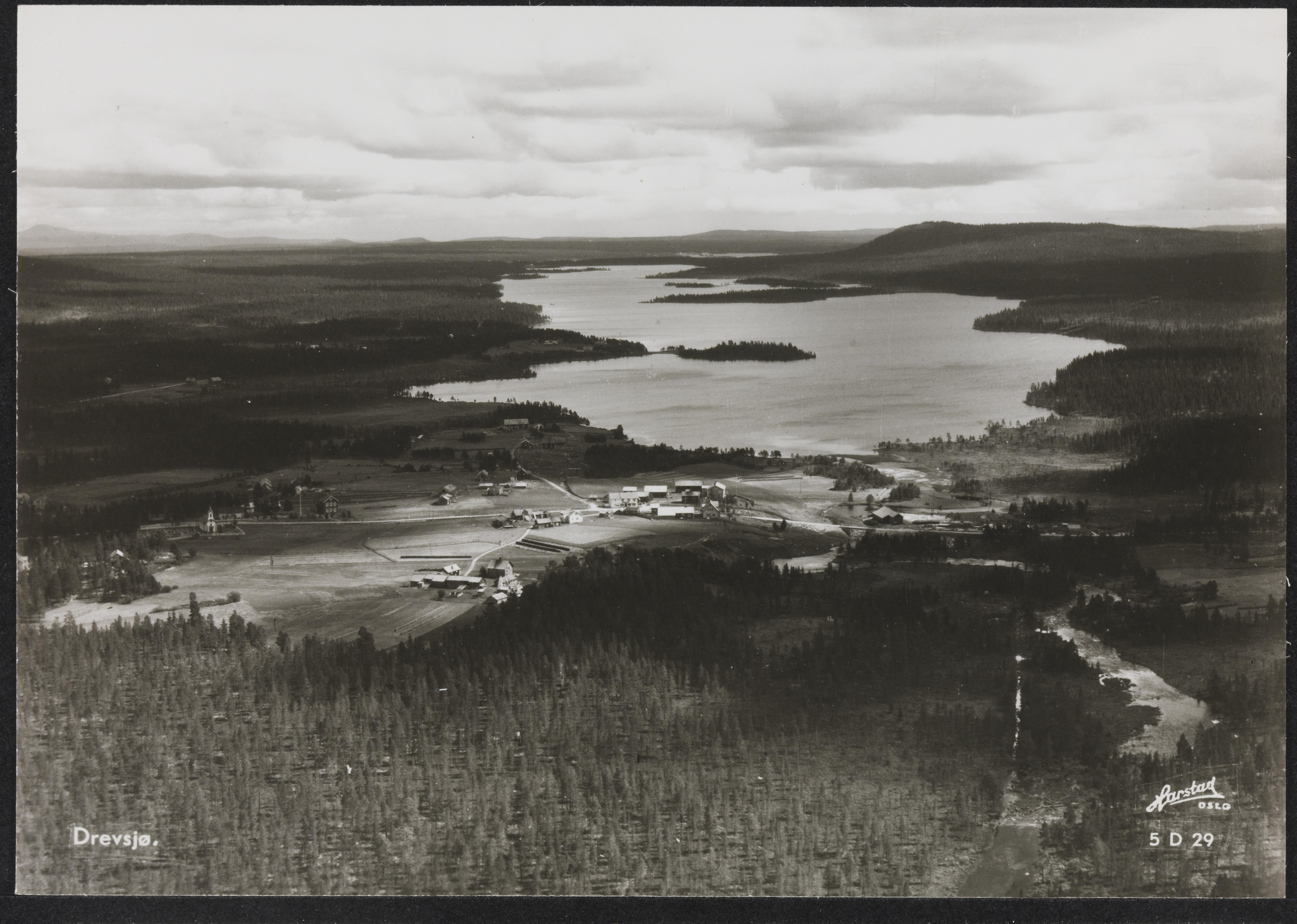
- View of the lake
- Interactive map of the lake
- Location: Engerdal Municipality, Innlandet
- Coordinates: 61°52′31″N 12°6′36″E
- Basin countries: Norway
- Max. length: 6.7 kilometres (4.2 mi)
- Max. width: 1.3 kilometres (0.81 mi)
- Surface area: 5.06 km^{2} (1.95 sq mi)
- Max. depth: 19.5 metres (64 ft)
- Shore length^{1}: 20.45 kilometres (12.71 mi)
- Surface elevation: 663 metres (2,175 ft)
- References: NVE
- ^{1} Shore length is not a well-defined measure.

Vurrusjøen is a lake in Engerdal Municipality in Innlandet county, Norway. The 5-square-kilometre (1.9 sq mi) lake lies immediately west of the border with Sweden and the village of Drevsjø sits on the west end of the lake. The Swedish lake Fløtningsjøen lies just east of this lake.

== See also ==
- List of lakes in Norway
