= Elgå Church =

Church in Innlandet, Norway

- Elgå kirke
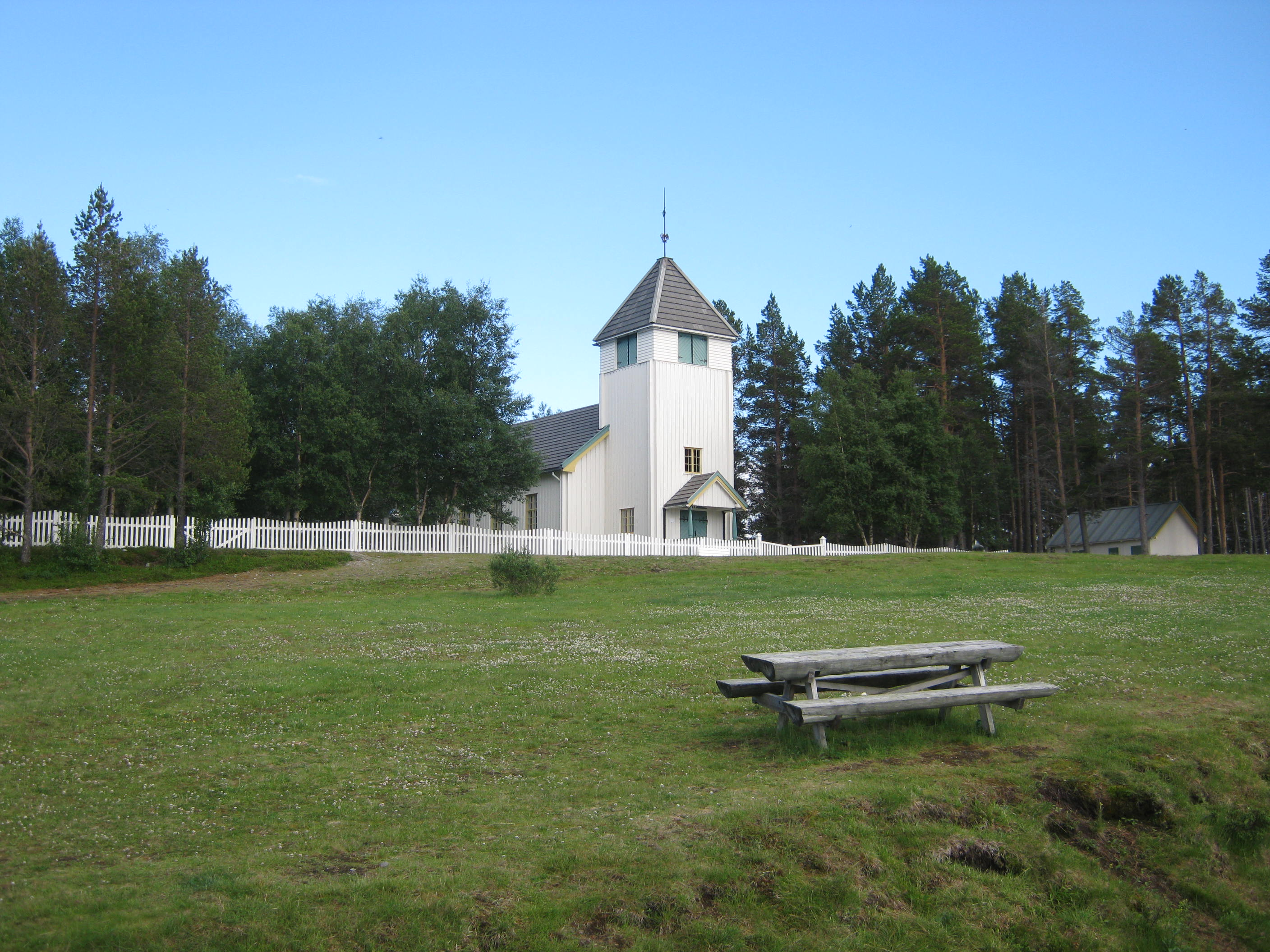
- View of the church
- Elgå Church
- 62°10′00″N 11°56′30″E
- Location: Engerdal Municipality, Innlandet
- Country: Norway
- Denomination: Church of Norway
- Churchmanship: Evangelical Lutheran

History
- Status: Parish church
- Founded: 1946
- Consecrated: 7 July 1946

Architecture
- Functional status: Active
- Architect: Simen Øyen
- Architectural type: Long church
- Completed: 1946 (80 years ago)

Specifications
- Capacity: 250
- Materials: Wood

Administration
- Diocese: Hamar bispedømme
- Deanery: Sør-Østerdal prosti
- Parish: Elgå
- Norwegian Cultural Heritage Site
- Type: Church
- Status: Not protected
- ID: 84087

Elgå Church (Norwegian: Elgå kirke) is a parish church of the Church of Norway in Engerdal Municipality in Innlandet county, Norway. It is located in the village of Elgå. It is the church for the Elgå parish which is part of the Sør-Østerdal prosti (deanery) in the Diocese of Hamar. The white, wooden church was built in a long church design in 1946 using plans drawn up by the architect Simen Øyen. The church seats about 250 people.

== History ==
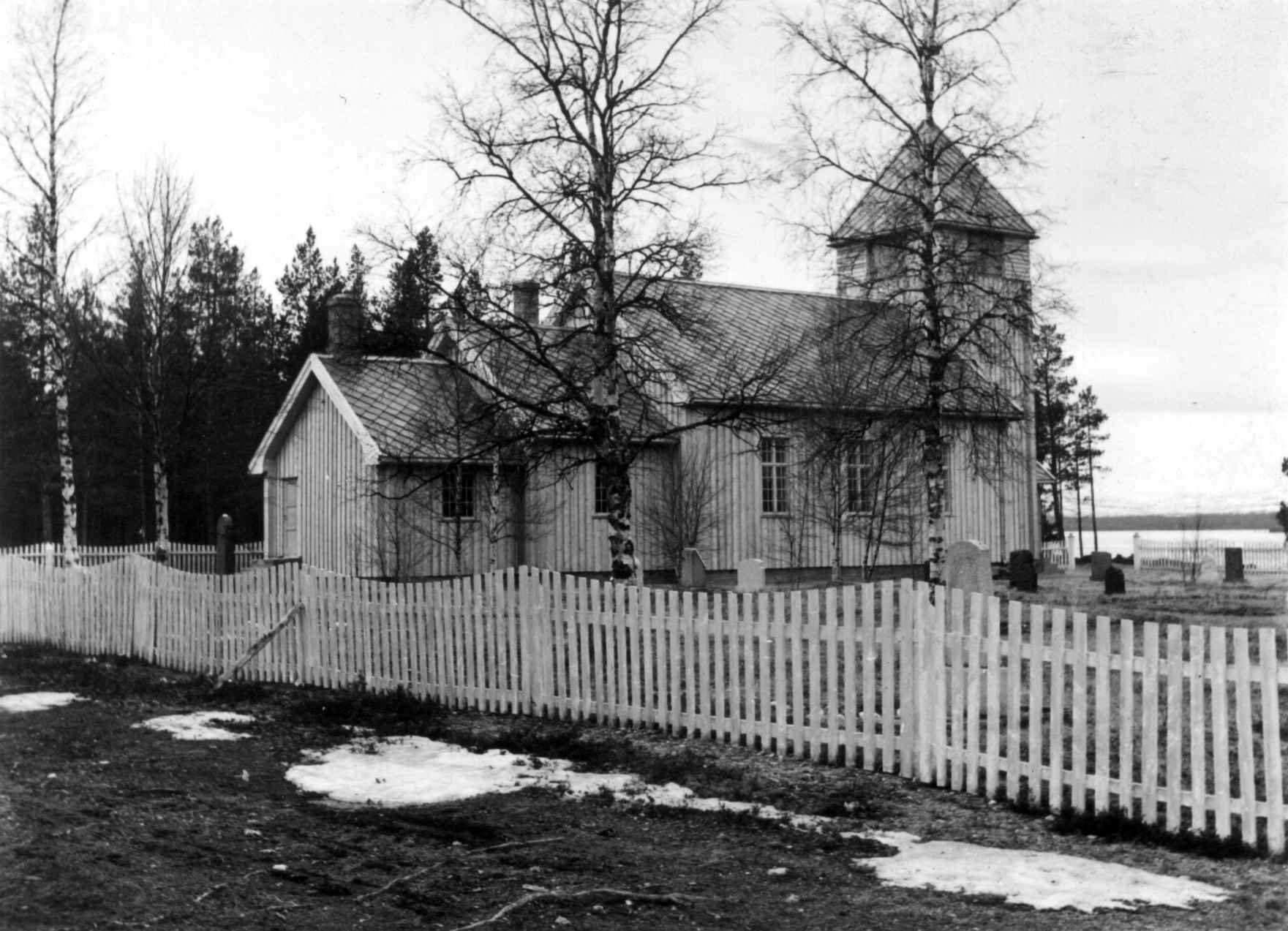
View of the church

Elgå got an auxiliary cemetery in 1855, and a school with a church hall on the 2nd floor was consecrated on 12 March 1879 (the school was consecrated in 1883). The building was eventually demolished, and a new school was taken into use in 1925. This left the village without a church for some time. In 1938, it was decided to build a new church building. Simon Øyen designed the new church free of charge and the lead builder was Gustav Knutsen. Construction of the new church started around the outbreak of World War II, but it is said that all work stopped due to a conflict between the church and Nasjonal Samling government during the Nazi occupation of Norway. After the war, planning and construction continued, and the new church was consecrated on 7 July 1946 by the acting Bishop, Alf Hauge.

== See also ==
- List of churches in Hamar
