= Reidar Åsgård =

Norwegian politician (born 1943)

- Born: 4 May 1943 (age 83)
- Political party: Labour Party (Norway)

Reidar Åsgård (born 4 May 1943) is a Norwegian politician for the Labour Party.

Following the 2007 elections Åsgård was elected the mayor of Engerdal Municipality in Hedmark county, Norway. Åsgård has held this office several times earlier, most recently from 1999 to 2003.

From 2003 to 2007 he held the highest political office of the internal politics of Hedmark county as he was the leader of the executive branch (Norwegian: fylkesrådsleder) of the Hedmark county council.
