= Engerdal Municipality =

Municipality in Innlandet, Norway

Engerdal Municipality Engerdal kommune Eengerdaelie
- Municipality
- Engerdalen herred (historic name)
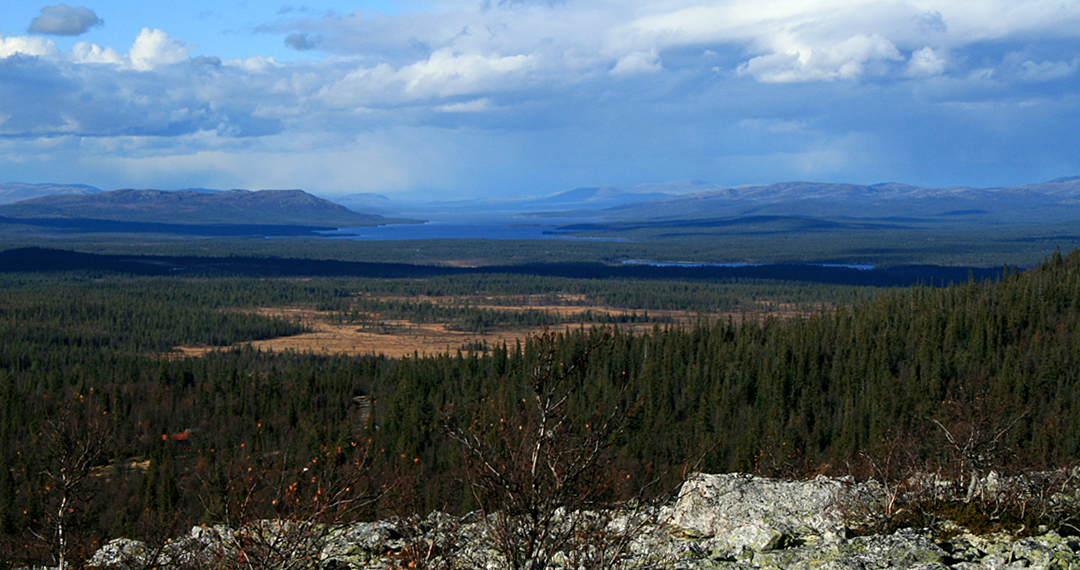
- View of the lake Femund in Engerdal

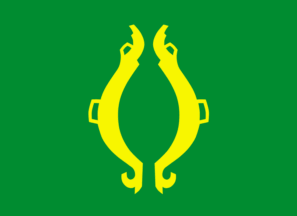
- Flag Coat of arms

- Innlandet within Norway

- Engerdal within Innlandet
- Coordinates: 61°53′N 12°2′E
- Country: Norway
- County: Innlandet
- District: Østerdalen
- Established: 1 Jan 1911
  - Preceded by: Tolga, Ytre Rendal, Øvre Rendal, and Trysil
- Administrative centre: Engerdal

Government
  - Mayor (2023): Tor Erik Skramstad (H)

Area
  - Total: 2,196.54 km^{2} (848.09 sq mi)
  - Land: 1,915.90 km^{2} (739.73 sq mi)
  - Water: 280.64 km^{2} (108.36 sq mi) 12.8%
  - Rank: #28 in Norway
- Highest elevation: 1,459.99 m (4,790.0 ft)

Population (2025)
  - Total: 1,326
  - Rank: #311 in Norway
  - Density: 0.6/km^{2} (1.6/sq mi)
  - Change (10 years): ▲ +1.2%
- Demonym: Engerdøl

Official language
  - Norwegian form: Bokmål
- Time zone: UTC+01:00 (CET)
  - Summer (DST): UTC+02:00 (CEST)
- ISO 3166 code: NO-3425
- Website: Official website

Engerdal is a municipality in Innlandet county, Norway. It is located in the traditional district of Østerdalen. The administrative centre of the municipality is the village of Engerdalen. Other villages in the municipality include Drevsjø, Elgå, Sømådal, and Sorken.

The 2,197-square-kilometre (848 sq mi) municipality is the 28th largest by area out of the 357 municipalities in Norway. Engerdal Municipality is the 311th most populous municipality in Norway with a population of 1,326. The municipality's population density is 0.6 inhabitants per square kilometre (1.6/sq mi) and its population has increased by 1.2% over the previous 10-year period.

== General information ==
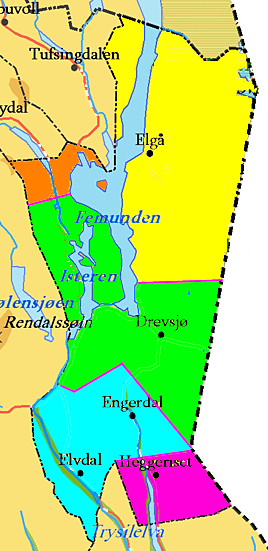
Creation of Engerdal municipality in 1911. Orange and yellow came from Tolga Municipality (orange was from Tolga parish and yellow was from Os Municipality parish), green came from Øvre Rendal Municipality, blue came from Ytre Rendal Municipality, and purple came from Trysil Municipality

The new municipality of Engerdal was established on 1 January 1911. This new municipality was created by taking some of the land from the following existing municipalities:

- 750 square kilometres (290 sq mi) of southeastern Tolga Municipality (population: 201)
- 330 square kilometres (130 sq mi) of eastern Ytre Rendal Municipality (population: 311)
- 692 square kilometres (267 sq mi) of eastern Øvre Rendal Municipality (population: 381)
- 168 square kilometres (65 sq mi) of northern Trysil Municipality (population: 291)

The borders of the municipality have not changed since its creation.

Historically, the municipality was part of Hedmark county. On 1 January 2020, the municipality became a part of the newly-formed Innlandet county (after Hedmark and Oppland counties were merged).

=== Name ===
The municipality was named Engerdal, after a local valley. The first element of the name comes from the local river Engeråa which flows through the valley. The river name is derived from the name of the lake Engeren, and this is probably derived from the Old Norse word ǫngr which means "narrow". The last element of the municipal name comes from the word dalr which means "valley" or "dale". Historically, the name of the municipality was spelled Engerdalen. On 3 November 1917, a royal resolution changed the spelling of the name of the municipality to Engerdal, removing the definite form ending -en.

=== Coat of arms ===
The coat of arms was granted on 8 February 1991. The official blazon is "Vert, a horse collar Or" (Norwegian: I grønt et gull bogtre). This means the arms have a green field (background) and the charge is a horse harness (the hames). The charge has a tincture of Or which means it is commonly colored yellow, but if it is made out of metal, then gold is used. The design symbolize the ties between horse and man and at the same time the connection between work and recreation. The arms were designed by Arvid Sveen. The municipal flag has the same design as the coat of arms.

=== Churches ===
The Church of Norway has five parishes (sokn) within Engerdal Municipality. It is part of the Sør-Østerdal prosti (deanery) in the Diocese of Hamar.

Churches in Engerdal
| Parish (sokn) | Church name | Location of the church | Year built |
|---|---|---|---|
| Drevsjø | Drevsjø Church | Drevsjø | 1848 |
| Elgå | Elgå Church | Elgå | 1946 |
| Engerdal | Engerdal Church | Engerdalen | 1873 |
| Sømådal | Sømådal Church | Sømådal | 1937 |
| Søre Elvdal | Søre Elvdal Church | Nymoen | 1885 |

== Geography ==
The municipality is located in the northeast part of Innlandet county. It is bordered by Sweden to the north and east, by Trysil Municipality to the south, by Rendalen Municipality to the west, and by Os Municipality and Tolga Municipality to the northwest. The greater part of Lake Femunden and roughly half of the Femundsmarka National Park also lie within the boundaries of the municipality. The highest point in the municipality is the 1,459.99-metre (4,790.0 ft) tall mountain Elgåhøgna. There are many large lakes in the municipality including Engeren, Galtsjøen, Gutulisjøen, Isteren, Langsjøen, Nedre Roasten, Rogen, and Vurrusjøen.

== Climate ==
Climate data for Drevsjø 1991-2020 (672 m)
| Month | Jan | Feb | Mar | Apr | May | Jun | Jul | Aug | Sep | Oct | Nov | Dec | Year |
|---|---|---|---|---|---|---|---|---|---|---|---|---|---|
| Mean daily maximum °C (°F) | −4.2 (24.4) | −2.9 (26.8) | 0.7 (33.3) | 5.3 (41.5) | 11.1 (52.0) | 15.6 (60.1) | 18.5 (65.3) | 16.6 (61.9) | 11.9 (53.4) | 5.1 (41.2) | −0.3 (31.5) | −3.6 (25.5) | 6.2 (43.1) |
| Daily mean °C (°F) | −8.8 (16.2) | −8.5 (16.7) | −5.0 (23.0) | 0.2 (32.4) | 5.6 (42.1) | 10.0 (50.0) | 12.8 (55.0) | 11.2 (52.2) | 7.0 (44.6) | 1.4 (34.5) | −3.8 (25.2) | −7.9 (17.8) | 1.2 (34.1) |
| Mean daily minimum °C (°F) | −14.0 (6.8) | −14.5 (5.9) | −11.1 (12.0) | −5.2 (22.6) | −0.4 (31.3) | 4.1 (39.4) | 6.9 (44.4) | 6.0 (42.8) | 2.5 (36.5) | −2.2 (28.0) | −7.7 (18.1) | −12.7 (9.1) | −4.1 (24.6) |
| Average precipitation mm (inches) | 34.0 (1.34) | 26.3 (1.04) | 25.2 (0.99) | 26.7 (1.05) | 56.9 (2.24) | 72.0 (2.83) | 85.3 (3.36) | 87.6 (3.45) | 57.9 (2.28) | 51.4 (2.02) | 42.2 (1.66) | 31.9 (1.26) | 597.4 (23.52) |
| Average precipitation days (≥ 1.0 mm) | 15 | 12 | 12 | 14 | 18 | 19 | 22 | 19 | 15 | 15 | 14 | 14 | 189 |
Source: NOAA

=== National parks ===
Engerdal consists of two national parks. Femundsmarka National Park was founded in 1971 and is situated in the far northeastern corner of the municipality. The area is popular for its many lakes and attracts a lot of people for sport fishing every year. The same lakes are also perfect for paddling the canoe. Due to its large continuously, untouched and protected area, the national park is one of southern Scandinavia's largest parks and the area has become a base for many rare animal species.

The second national park, Gutulia National Park is much smaller, but has a more vigorous complex of trees and bogs. It was founded in 1968 and the many large, but old pines dominates the area.

== Government ==
Engerdal Municipality is responsible for primary education (through 10th grade), outpatient health services, senior citizen services, welfare and other social services, zoning, economic development, and municipal roads and utilities. The municipality is governed by a municipal council of directly elected representatives. The mayor is indirectly elected by a vote of the municipal council. The municipality is under the jurisdiction of the Hedmarken og Østerdal District Court and the Eidsivating Court of Appeal.

=== Municipal council ===
The municipal council (Kommunestyre) of Engerdal Municipality is made up of 15 representatives that are elected to four year terms. The tables below show the current and historical composition of the council by political party.

Engerdal kommunestyre 2023–2027
| Party name (in Norwegian) | Number of representatives |
|---|---|
| Labour Party (Arbeiderpartiet) | 5 |
| Conservative Party (Høyre) | 4 |
| Centre Party (Senterpartiet) | 6 |
| Total number of members: | 15 |

Engerdal kommunestyre 2019–2023
| Party name (in Norwegian) | Number of representatives |
|---|---|
| Labour Party (Arbeiderpartiet) | 7 |
| Conservative Party (Høyre) | 1 |
| Common List: Centre Party and unaffiliated (Samlingslista: Senterpartiet og uavhengige) | 7 |
| Total number of members: | 15 |

Engerdal kommunestyre 2015–2019
| Party name (in Norwegian) | Number of representatives |
|---|---|
| Labour Party (Arbeiderpartiet) | 6 |
| Conservative Party (Høyre) | 1 |
| Joint list of the Centre Party (Senterpartiet) and the Liberal Party (Venstre) | 8 |
| Total number of members: | 15 |

Engerdal kommunestyre 2011–2015
| Party name (in Norwegian) | Number of representatives |
|---|---|
| Labour Party (Arbeiderpartiet) | 7 |
| Conservative Party (Høyre) | 2 |
| Joint list of the Centre Party (Senterpartiet) and the Liberal Party (Venstre) | 6 |
| Total number of members: | 15 |

Engerdal kommunestyre 2007–2011
| Party name (in Norwegian) | Number of representatives |
|---|---|
| Labour Party (Arbeiderpartiet) | 8 |
| Conservative Party (Høyre) | 1 |
| Joint list of the Centre Party (Senterpartiet) and the Liberal Party (Venstre) | 6 |
| Total number of members: | 15 |

Engerdal kommunestyre 2003–2007
| Party name (in Norwegian) | Number of representatives |
|---|---|
| Labour Party (Arbeiderpartiet) | 7 |
| Conservative Party (Høyre) | 2 |
| Joint list of the Centre Party (Senterpartiet) and the Liberal Party (Venstre) | 6 |
| Total number of members: | 15 |

Engerdal kommunestyre 1999–2003
| Party name (in Norwegian) | Number of representatives |
|---|---|
| Labour Party (Arbeiderpartiet) | 8 |
| Conservative Party (Høyre) | 1 |
| Joint list of the Centre Party (Senterpartiet) and the Liberal Party (Venstre) | 6 |
| Total number of members: | 15 |

Engerdal kommunestyre 1995–1999
| Party name (in Norwegian) | Number of representatives |
|---|---|
| Labour Party (Arbeiderpartiet) | 10 |
| Conservative Party (Høyre) | 3 |
| Joint list of the Centre Party (Senterpartiet) and the Liberal Party (Venstre) | 8 |
| Total number of members: | 21 |

Engerdal kommunestyre 1991–1995
| Party name (in Norwegian) | Number of representatives |
|---|---|
| Labour Party (Arbeiderpartiet) | 7 |
| Conservative Party (Høyre) | 2 |
| Socialist Left Party (Sosialistisk Venstreparti) | 2 |
| Joint list of the Centre Party (Senterpartiet) and the Liberal Party (Venstre) | 6 |
| Total number of members: | 17 |

Engerdal kommunestyre 1987–1991
| Party name (in Norwegian) | Number of representatives |
|---|---|
| Labour Party (Arbeiderpartiet) | 8 |
| Conservative Party (Høyre) | 2 |
| Joint list of the Centre Party (Senterpartiet) and the Liberal Party (Venstre) | 7 |
| Total number of members: | 17 |

Engerdal kommunestyre 1983–1987
| Party name (in Norwegian) | Number of representatives |
|---|---|
| Labour Party (Arbeiderpartiet) | 10 |
| Conservative Party (Høyre) | 2 |
| Centre Party (Senterpartiet) | 4 |
| Free voters in Engerdal (Frie velgere i Engerdal) | 1 |
| Total number of members: | 17 |

Engerdal kommunestyre 1979–1983
| Party name (in Norwegian) | Number of representatives |
|---|---|
| Labour Party (Arbeiderpartiet) | 9 |
| Conservative Party (Høyre) | 2 |
| Centre Party (Senterpartiet) | 5 |
| Free voters in Engerdal (Frie velgere i Engerdal) | 1 |
| Total number of members: | 17 |

Engerdal kommunestyre 1975–1979
| Party name (in Norwegian) | Number of representatives |
|---|---|
| Labour Party (Arbeiderpartiet) | 9 |
| Conservative Party (Høyre) | 1 |
| New People's Party (Nye Folkepartiet) | 1 |
| Centre Party (Senterpartiet) | 5 |
| Liberal Party (Venstre) | 1 |
| Total number of members: | 17 |

Engerdal kommunestyre 1971–1975
| Party name (in Norwegian) | Number of representatives |
|---|---|
| Labour Party (Arbeiderpartiet) | 10 |
| Conservative Party (Høyre) | 1 |
| Centre Party (Senterpartiet) | 5 |
| Liberal Party (Venstre) | 1 |
| Total number of members: | 17 |

Engerdal kommunestyre 1967–1971
| Party name (in Norwegian) | Number of representatives |
|---|---|
| Labour Party (Arbeiderpartiet) | 10 |
| Conservative Party (Høyre) | 1 |
| Centre Party (Senterpartiet) | 4 |
| Liberal Party (Venstre) | 2 |
| Total number of members: | 17 |

Engerdal kommunestyre 1963–1967
| Party name (in Norwegian) | Number of representatives |
|---|---|
| Labour Party (Arbeiderpartiet) | 9 |
| Conservative Party (Høyre) | 1 |
| Centre Party (Senterpartiet) | 5 |
| Liberal Party (Venstre) | 2 |
| Total number of members: | 17 |

Engerdal herredsstyre 1959–1963
| Party name (in Norwegian) | Number of representatives |
|---|---|
| Labour Party (Arbeiderpartiet) | 9 |
| Conservative Party (Høyre) | 1 |
| Centre Party (Senterpartiet) | 5 |
| Liberal Party (Venstre) | 2 |
| Total number of members: | 17 |

Engerdal herredsstyre 1955–1959
| Party name (in Norwegian) | Number of representatives |
|---|---|
| Labour Party (Arbeiderpartiet) | 8 |
| Conservative Party (Høyre) | 1 |
| Farmers' Party (Bondepartiet) | 5 |
| Liberal Party (Venstre) | 3 |
| Total number of members: | 17 |

Engerdal herredsstyre 1951–1955
| Party name (in Norwegian) | Number of representatives |
|---|---|
| Labour Party (Arbeiderpartiet) | 7 |
| Conservative Party (Høyre) | 1 |
| Farmers' Party (Bondepartiet) | 2 |
| Liberal Party (Venstre) | 2 |
| Total number of members: | 12 |

Engerdal herredsstyre 1947–1951
| Party name (in Norwegian) | Number of representatives |
|---|---|
| Labour Party (Arbeiderpartiet) | 7 |
| Joint list of the Liberal Party (Venstre) and the Radical People's Party (Radikale Folkepartiet) | 2 |
| Joint List(s) of Non-Socialist Parties (Borgerlige Felleslister) | 3 |
| Total number of members: | 12 |

Engerdal herredsstyre 1945–1947
| Party name (in Norwegian) | Number of representatives |
|---|---|
| Labour Party (Arbeiderpartiet) | 7 |
| Joint list of the Liberal Party (Venstre) and the Radical People's Party (Radikale Folkepartiet) | 2 |
| Joint List(s) of Non-Socialist Parties (Borgerlige Felleslister) | 3 |
| Total number of members: | 12 |

Engerdal herredsstyre 1937–1941*
| Party name (in Norwegian) | Number of representatives |
|---|---|
| Labour Party (Arbeiderpartiet) | 6 |
| Common List: Liberal Party and small farmholders (Samlingslista: Venstre og småbrukere) | 7 |
| Joint List(s) of Non-Socialist Parties (Borgerlige Felleslister) | 4 |
| Total number of members: | 12 |
Note: Due to the German occupation of Norway during World War II, no elections were held for new municipal councils until after the war ended in 1945.

=== Mayors ===
The mayor (Norwegian: ordfører) of Engerdal Municipality is the political leader of the municipality and the chairperson of the municipal council. Here is a list of people who have held this position:

- 1911–1916: Guren A. Gløtvold (H)
- 1917–1919: Ole Puntervold (LL)
- 1919-1919: Peder Omang (ArbDem)
- 1920–1925: Guren A. Gløtvold (H)
- 1926–1928: Ottar Andersen (RF)
- 1929–1931: Kristian Lian (Ap)
- 1931–1931: Knut Omang (Ap)
- 1932–1937: Ottar Andersen (RF)
- 1938–1940: John Sand (Ap)
- 1941–1945: Peder Grøndalen (NS)
- 1945-1945: Ottar Andersen (V)
- 1945-1945: F.O. Sponberg (Ap)
- 1946–1947: John Sand (Ap)
- 1947–1947: F.O. Sponberg (Ap)
- 1948–1951: Reodor Wardenær (Ap)
- 1952–1955: Emil Stang (Ap)
- 1956–1959: Peder Myrstad (Bp)
- 1960–1963: Reodor Wardenær (Ap)
- 1964–1971: Pauli Opgård (Ap)
- 1972–1975: Edgar Krog (Ap)
- 1975–1983: Ola Joten (Ap)
- 1984–1987: Reidar Åsgård (Ap)
- 1988–1991: Ola D. Gløtvold (Sp)
- 1992–2003: Reidar Åsgård (Ap)
- 2003–2007: Dag Rønning (Sp)
- 2007–2011: Reidar Åsgård (Ap)
- 2011–2019: Lars Erik Hyllvang (Sp)
- 2019–2023: Line Storsnes (Sp)
- 2023–present: Tor Erik Skramstad (H)

== Economy ==
The most important industries in the municipality are agriculture and travel and tourism. The area of agricultural activity constitute 13,000 acres (53 km^{2}), which includes about 60 operating units. Due to the harsh climate, the agricultural activity is mainly based around production of domestic animals, such as sheep and milk production. Another important activity is forestry. The total area of forestry make up 1,000,636 acres (4,049.43 km^{2}), where 517,680 acres (2,095.0 km^{2}) of this is productive land for logging. Of the forested land, about 40% consists of spruce and 60% of pine. The main owner of the land is the Norwegian state, while the rest is divided between private land owners and some belongs to the company Engerdal kommuneskoger (KF), a subsidiary company owned by the municipality.

== Tourism ==
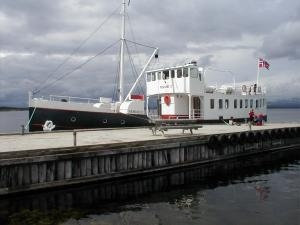
The old steamship seen at the harbour

Due to the growth in building secondary residences in the municipality, recreation and leisure activities have become important for those visiting Engerdal, and this has had a positive effect on the municipality's travel and tourism industry. Today, multiple attractions, activities and museums reflect the municipality's long history and many of them have become important businesses for economic growth while keeping the cultural heritage intact.

=== Museums ===
Blokkodden Villmarksmuseum is an outdoor museum situated along highway 26 in Drevsjø. Its aim is to document the historical exploitation of the wilderness and natural resources in the municipal. You will experience the cultural heritage dated all the way back from the 1700th century and you will get an impression of how people lived and worked here in the past.

Engerdal is the only municipality in Innlandet county with a full-time working Sami community, and it marks the current southernmost border of the traditional Sami region, Sápmi, within Norway. The museum, therefore, exhibits artifacts and buildings from this culture. The museum is open everyday from 1 July to 12 August. Guided tours are available and people can participate in special local arrangements, such as learning about "Falkefangst". About 300–400 years ago, this was a way of hunting Falcons in the mountains.

=== Attractions ===
In 1886 the steamship company Fæmund was established, and they invested in a wooden steamship, which today holds the same name: M/S Femund II. From then and still going today, the steamship cargos important goods for the locals and has become an important transportation for tourists wanting to visit the national parks along the lake.

== Notable people ==
- Gjermund Eggen (1941 in Engerdal – 2019), a cross-country skier who won three gold medals at the FIS Nordic World Ski Championships 1966
- Reidar Åsgård (born 1943), a Norwegian politician and mayor of Engerdal
- Ola D. Gløtvold (born 1949 in Engerdal), a Norwegian politician and mayor of Engerdal

== See also ==
- Scandinavian Mountains Airport
