= Søre Elvdal Church =

Church in Innlandet, Norway

- Søre Elvdal kirke
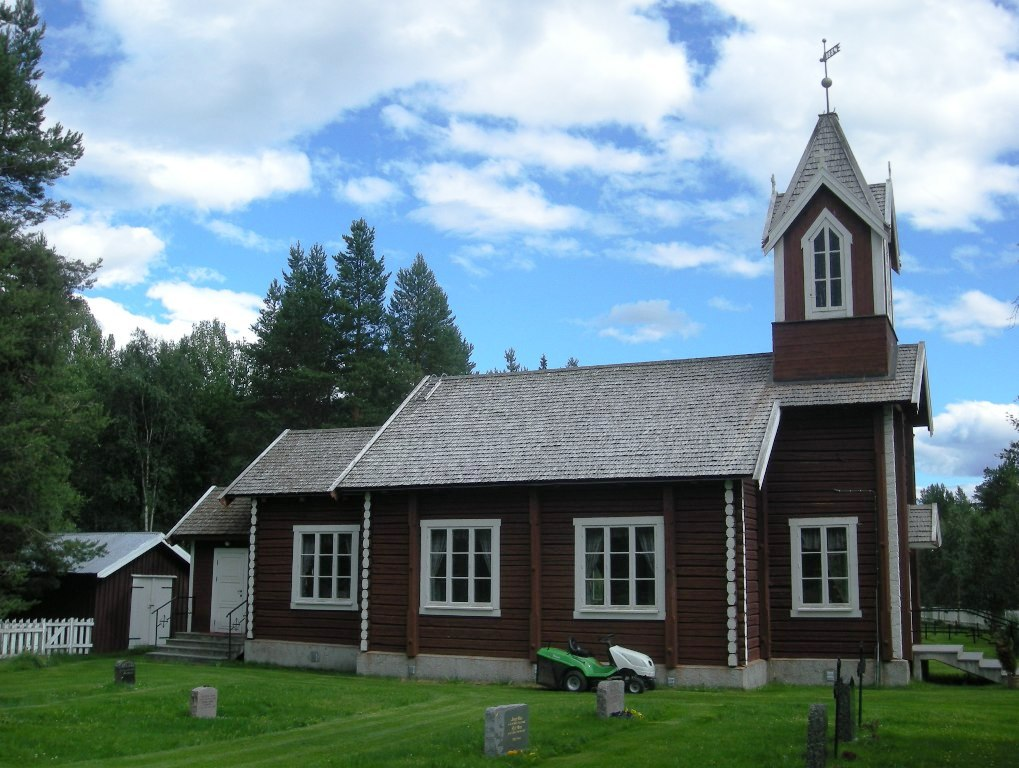
- View of the church
- Søre Elvdal Church
- 61°40′04″N 11°47′10″E
- Location: Engerdal Municipality, Innlandet
- Country: Norway
- Denomination: Church of Norway
- Churchmanship: Evangelical Lutheran

History
- Status: Parish church
- Founded: 1885
- Consecrated: 1885

Architecture
- Functional status: Active
- Architectural type: Long church
- Completed: 1885 (141 years ago)

Specifications
- Capacity: 80
- Materials: Wood

Administration
- Diocese: Hamar bispedømme
- Deanery: Sør-Østerdal prosti
- Parish: Søre Elvdal
- Norwegian Cultural Heritage Site
- Type: Church
- Status: Not protected
- ID: 85047

Søre Elvdal Church (Norwegian: Søre Elvdal kirke) is a parish church of the Church of Norway in Engerdal Municipality in Innlandet county, Norway. It is located in the village of Nymoen. It is the church for the Søre Elvdal parish which is part of the Sør-Østerdal prosti (deanery) in the Diocese of Hamar. The brown, wooden church was built in a long church design in 1885 using plans drawn up by an unknown architect. The church seats about 80 people.

== History ==
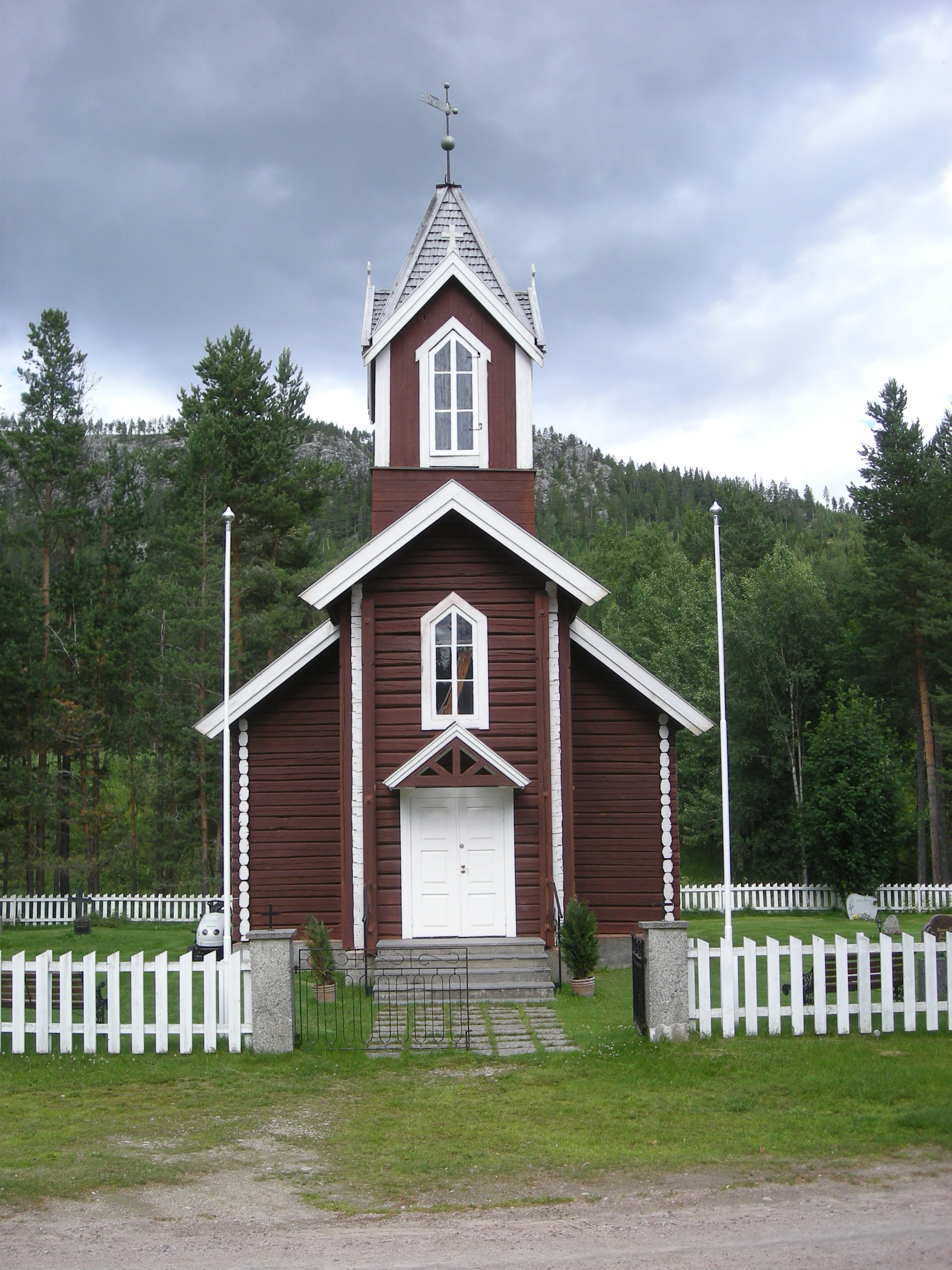
Front view of the church

During the 1860s, planning for a new church in Nymoen. Timber for the church was cut at Skjærbekkdalen, west of the river Femundselva. Disputes over property rights led to lawsuits, and the timber remained for 17 years and was eventually destroyed. Then, in the 1880s, new timber had to be cut, and the church could be built. Construction of the church was during 1884–1885. The church was consecrated in 1885. In 1921, the church roof caught fire from sparks from a wood stove.

Initially, there was a folding wall between the nave and the choir because the nave was also used as a school during the week. In 1920, a new local school was built and after that time, the folding wall was removed, and it was solely used as a church from that time on.

In the early 21st century, there was a bitter conflict between the congregation and the Norwegian Directorate for Cultural Heritage in connection with the renovation of the church. The church had fallen into disrepair for a number of years. The parish wanted to repair the floor and since the Directorate officially designated the building as protected, the parish needed permission to do so. An inspector from the directorate gave approval to repair the floor and at one point mentioned that the walls and ceilings needed to be repaired as well. In the spring of 2004, the church walls and ceiling were refurbished, with the parish basing this on the recommendation of the inspection several years earlier. After restoration work began in April 2004, the Directorate ordered that the renovation be stopped immediately. The objections were to sandblasting the walls inside, the use of concrete soles under the floor, and the use of modern paint. However, the renovation continued, and the Directorate imposed a fine on the parish council, which refused to pay it. The case ended up in the Nord-Østerdal District Court. There, the parish council was acquitted unanimously on the grounds that they had been encouraged to do something with the church without being told that one had to apply to the Directorate for permission for all interventions, and that they had also hired a professional (who had recommended sandblasting). Afterwards, there was talk of an appeal from the Directorate, but instead the Directorate removed the historic protections for the building.

== See also ==
- List of churches in Hamar
