= Drevsjø Church =

Church in Innlandet, Norway

- Drevsjø kirke
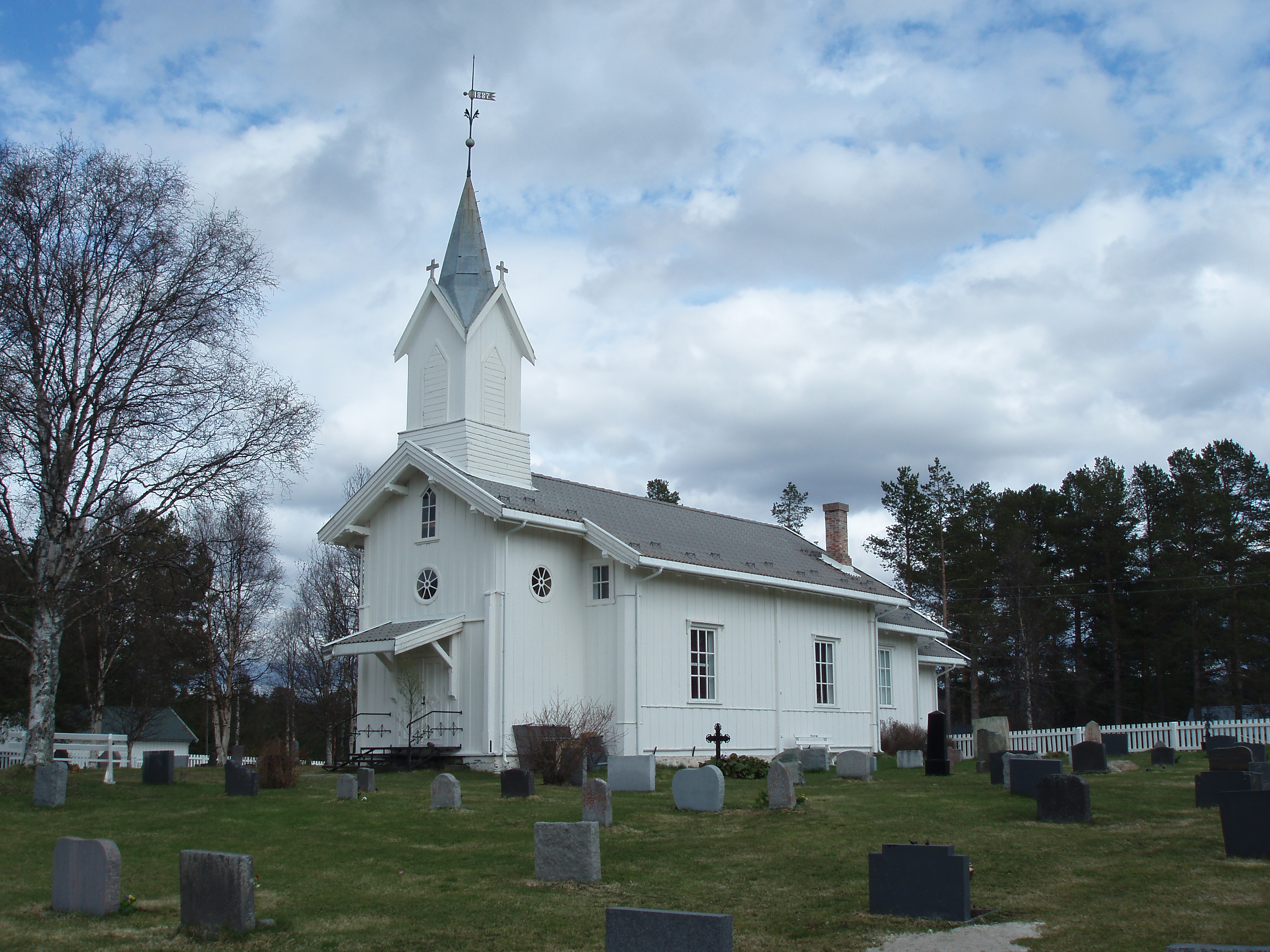
- View of the church
- Drevsjø Church
- 61°53′05″N 12°01′48″E
- Location: Engerdal Municipality, Innlandet
- Country: Norway
- Denomination: Church of Norway
- Churchmanship: Evangelical Lutheran

History
- Status: Parish church
- Founded: 1847
- Consecrated: 1847

Architecture
- Functional status: Active
- Architectural type: Long church
- Completed: 1847 (179 years ago)

Specifications
- Capacity: 250
- Materials: Wood

Administration
- Diocese: Hamar bispedømme
- Deanery: Sør-Østerdal prosti
- Parish: Drevsjø
- Norwegian Cultural Heritage Site
- Type: Church
- Status: Automatically protected
- ID: 84036

Drevsjø Church (Norwegian: Drevsjø kirke) is a parish church of the Church of Norway in Engerdal Municipality in Innlandet county, Norway. It is located in the village of Drevsjø. It is the church for the Drevsjø parish which is part of the Sør-Østerdal prosti (deanery) in the Diocese of Hamar. The white, wooden church was built in a long church design in 1847 using plans drawn up by an unknown architect. The church seats about 250 people.

== History ==
In the 1840s, increasing populations in the Drevsjø area led to the construction of a new annex chapel in the village. The chapel was consecrated in 1847. Initially, two services were held in the chapel each year. In 1886–1887, the chapel was enlarged by adding a church porch with a tower, choir, and sacristy.

== See also ==
- List of churches in Hamar
