= Engeren =

Lake in Innlandet, Norway

- Interactive map of the lake
- Location: Engerdal and Trysil, Innlandet
- Coordinates: 61°36′39″N 12°1′41″E
- Primary inflows: Engeråa river
- Primary outflows: Engeråa river
- Basin countries: Norway
- Max. length: 17 kilometres (11 mi)
- Max. width: 850 metres (2,790 ft)
- Surface area: 11.4937 km^{2} (4.4377 sq mi)
- Max. depth: 80 metres (260 ft)
- Shore length^{1}: 36.89 km (22.92 mi)
- Surface elevation: 472 metres (1,549 ft)
- References: NVE
- ^{1} Shore length is not a well-defined measure.

Engeren is a lake in Innlandet county, Norway. The 11.5-square-kilometre (4.4 sq mi) lake is very long and narrow and it forms part of the border between Engerdal Municipality and Trysil Municipality. The Norwegian County Road 26 runs along the eastern shore of the lake. The lake is part of the river Engeråa which flows into the river Trysilelva about 1.5 kilometres (0.93 mi) south of the southern end of the lake.

== See also ==
- List of lakes in Norway
