= Rogen moraine =

Landform of ridges deposited by a glacier or ice sheet transverse to ice flow

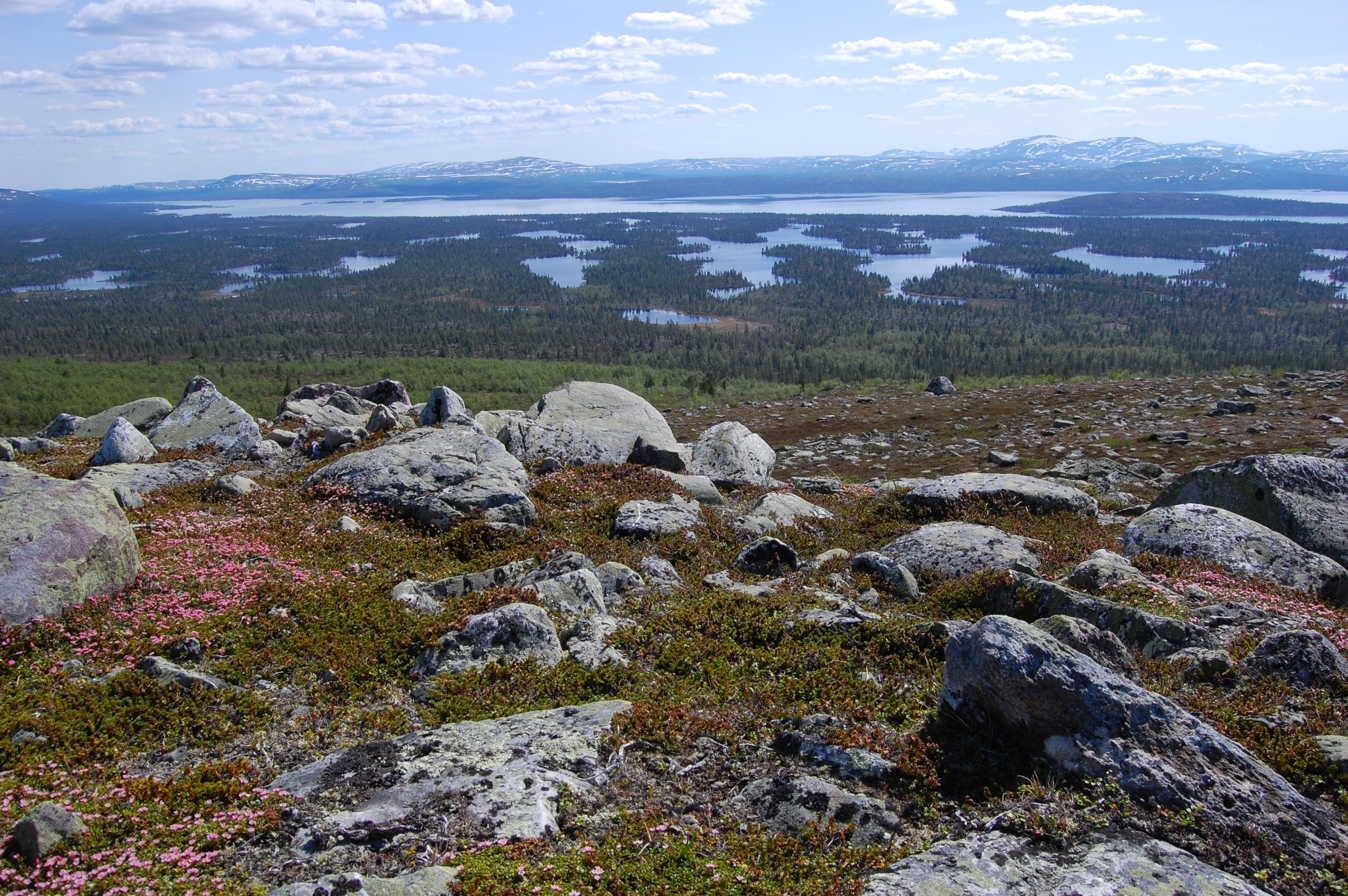
Lake Rogen, Sweden as seen from the north. The forested ridges in the lake are 'Rogen moraines' of which this is the type location

A Rogen moraine, also called ribbed moraine, is a subglacially (i.e. under a glacier or ice sheet) formed type of moraine landform, that mainly occurs in Fennoscandia, Scotland, Ireland and Canada. It is one of the three main types of hummocky moraines. They cover large areas that have been covered by ice, and occur mostly in what is believed to have been the central areas of the ice sheets. Rogen moraines are named after Lake Rogen in Härjedalen, Sweden, the landform's type locality. Rogen Nature Reserve serves to protect the unusual area.

The landform occurs in groups that are often closely and regularly spaced. They consist of glacial drift, with till being the most common constituent. The individual moraines are large, wavy ridges orientated transverse to ice flow. Drumlins are often found in close proximity to Rogen moraines, and are often interpreted to be formed at the same time as the Rogen moraines. Although Rogen moraines can span a large range of sizes, the most common distribution seems to be 10–30 metres high, 150–300 metres wide and 300–1,200 metres long.

The exact mechanics of Rogen moraine formation are not known, but since the 1970s, several theories on the formation have been proposed:

- Megaripples eroded in the basal ice fill during subglacial outburst floods.
- Already existing landforms, such as drumlins and flutes or marginal moraines are reshaped due to a ≈90° change in the direction of the ice flow.
- Debris-rich basal ice or pre-existing sediments are sheared and stacked, or folded during compressive ice flow.
- Shearing of sediment under a glacier causes the growth of waves with spacing characteristic of Rogen moraine (300 m to 1000 m).
- Sediment sheets become fractured and extended during a transition of the overlying glacier from being cold based ice to warm based.

However, it has been suggested that, due to the diversity of morphological characteristics displayed by Rogen moraine, different processes might be able to create the landform. This means that all of the processes mentioned above might be correct. The different theories that proposed a formation near or at the glacial margin have largely been abandoned. Some of these theories proposed that Rogen moraines had an origin as a series of end moraines, that they formed in association with calving ice termini in glacial lakes, or that Rogen moraines formed in dead ice, where supraglacial material fell down into crevasses in the ice.

== See also ==
- Drumlin – Elongated hill formed by glacial action
