= Sømådal Church =

Church in Innlandet, Norway

- Sømådal kirke
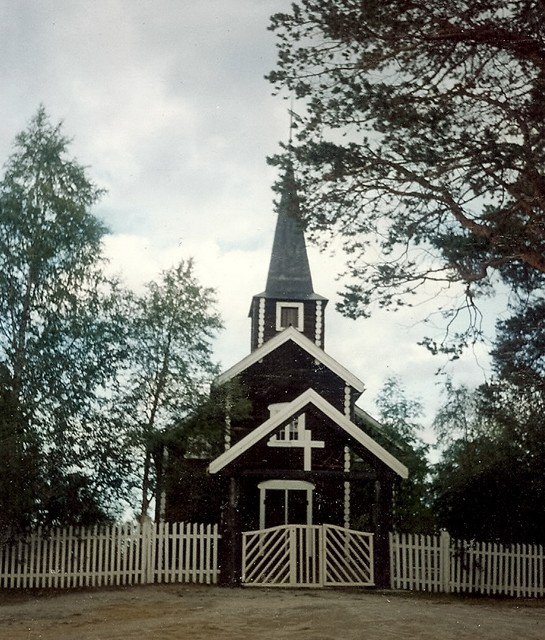
- View of the church
- Sømådal Church
- 62°05′57″N 11°39′39″E
- Location: Engerdal Municipality, Innlandet
- Country: Norway
- Denomination: Church of Norway
- Churchmanship: Evangelical Lutheran

History
- Status: Parish church
- Founded: 1937
- Consecrated: 1 September 1937

Architecture
- Functional status: Active
- Architectural type: Long church
- Completed: 1937 (89 years ago)

Specifications
- Capacity: 150
- Materials: Wood

Administration
- Diocese: Hamar bispedømme
- Deanery: Sør-Østerdal prosti
- Parish: Sømådal
- Norwegian Cultural Heritage Site
- Type: Church
- Status: Not protected
- ID: 85040

Sømådal Church (Norwegian: Sømådal kirke) is a parish church of the Church of Norway in Engerdal Municipality in Innlandet county, Norway. It is located in the village of Sømådal. It is the church for the Sømådal parish which is part of the Sør-Østerdal prosti (deanery) in the Diocese of Hamar. The brown, wooden church was built in a long church design in 1937. The church seats about 150 people.

== History ==
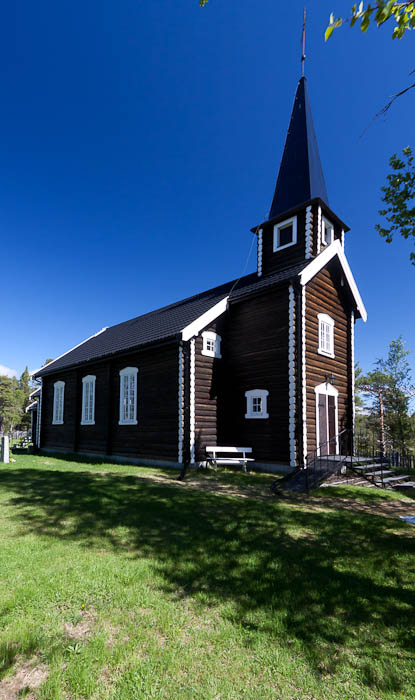
View of the church

In 1923, a cemetery was built in Sømådal to serve the northwestern part of the municipality near the border with Rendalen Municipality, Tolga Municipality, and Os Municipality. In the mid-1930s, the parish began planning for a church at the site of the cemetery. Gustav Knutsen was hired as the lead builder. The new church was consecrated on 1 September 1937.

== See also ==
- List of churches in Hamar
