= Engerdal Church =

Church in Innlandet, Norway

- Engerdal kirke
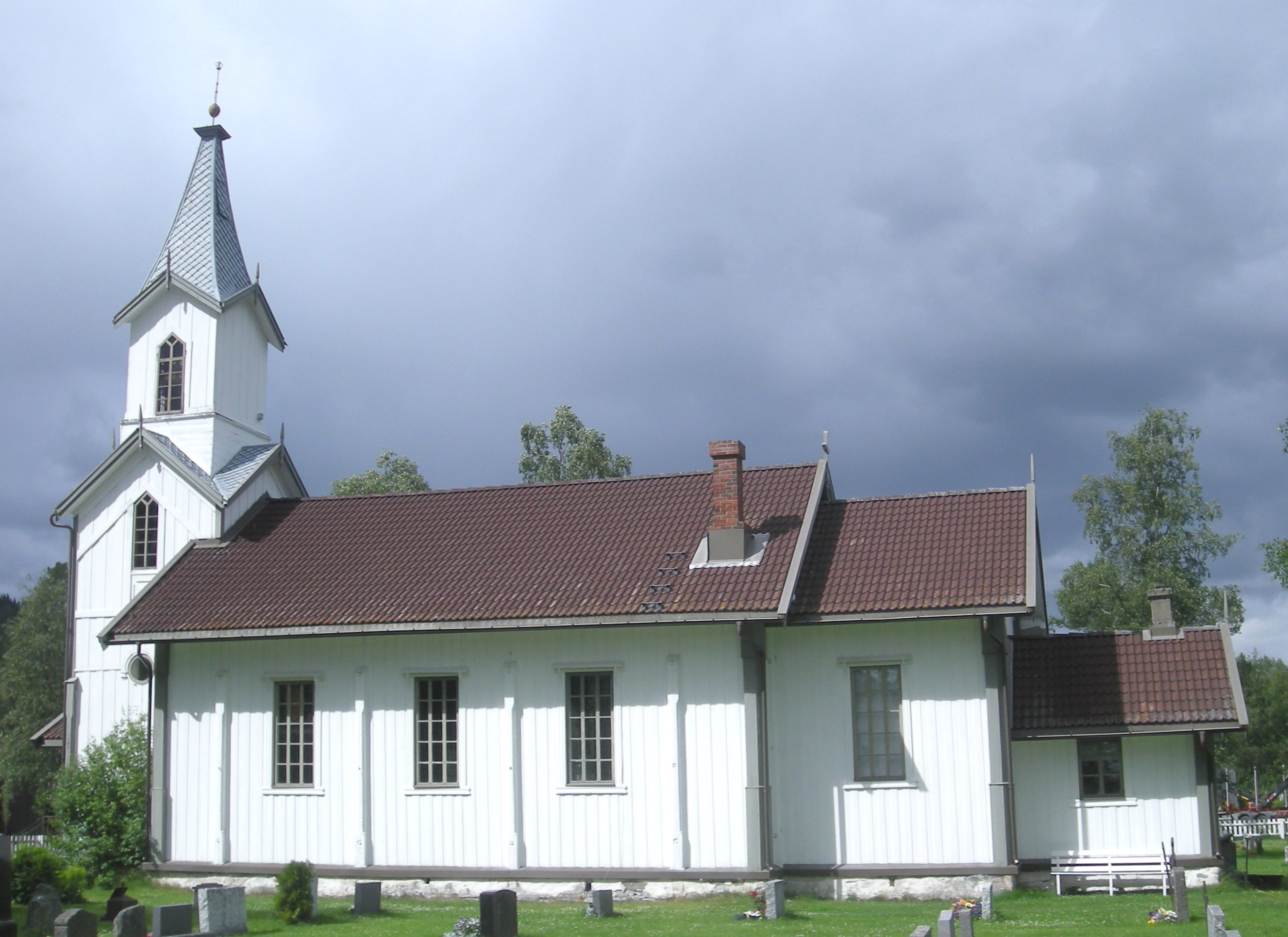
- View of the church
- Engerdal Church
- 61°45′28″N 11°57′38″E
- Location: Engerdal Municipality, Innlandet
- Country: Norway
- Denomination: Church of Norway
- Churchmanship: Evangelical Lutheran

History
- Status: Parish church
- Founded: 1873
- Consecrated: 1873

Architecture
- Functional status: Active
- Architectural type: Long church
- Completed: 1873 (153 years ago)

Specifications
- Capacity: 250
- Materials: Wood

Administration
- Diocese: Hamar bispedømme
- Deanery: Sør-Østerdal prosti
- Parish: Engerdal
- Norwegian Cultural Heritage Site
- Type: Church
- Status: Protected
- ID: 84098

Engerdal Church (Norwegian: Engerdal kirke) is a parish church of the Church of Norway in Engerdal Municipality in Innlandet county, Norway. It is located in the village of Engerdal. It is the church for the Engerdal parish which is part of the Sør-Østerdal prosti (deanery) in the Diocese of Hamar. The white, wooden church was built in a long church design in 1873 using by an unknown architect. The church seats about 250 people.

== History ==
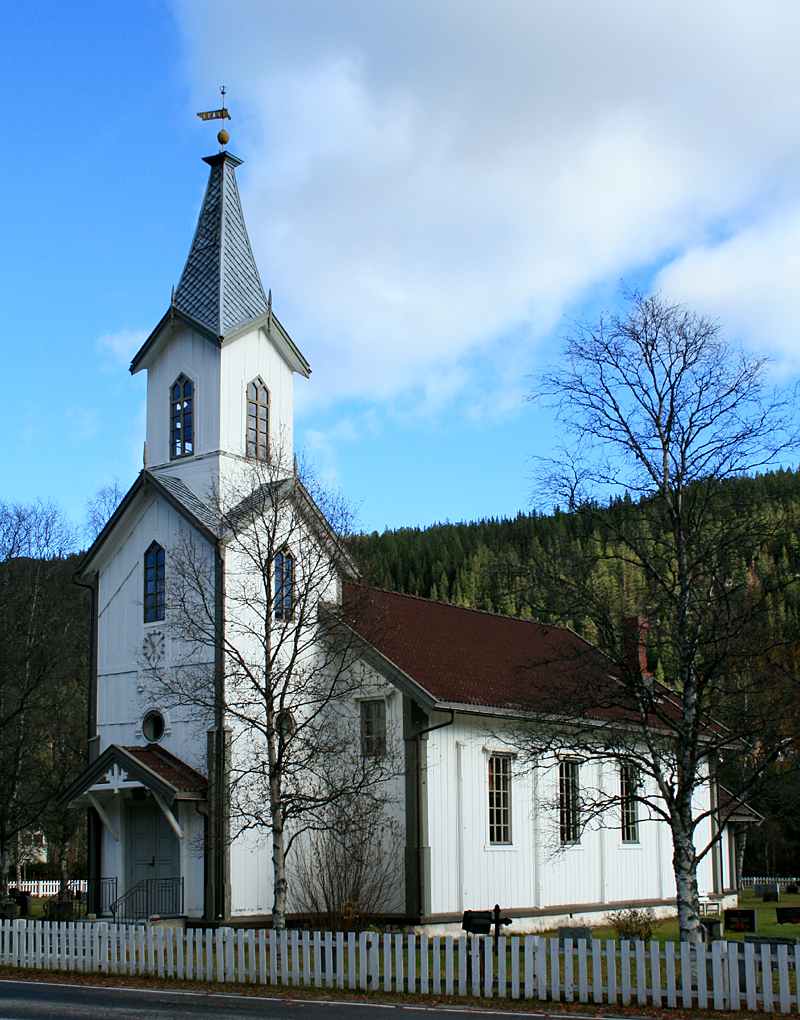
View of the church

The first church in Engerdal was built in 1871–1873. Johan Olsen from Elverum and Teodor Embretsen Nordvi from Trysil were responsible for the carpentry work. The new church was a timber-framed long church. The altarpiece was painted by teacher Peder Haugen from Haugen in Engerdal. The church building was consecrated in 1873.

== See also ==
- List of churches in Hamar
