= Rogen Nature Reserve =

Nature reserve in Jämtland, Sweden

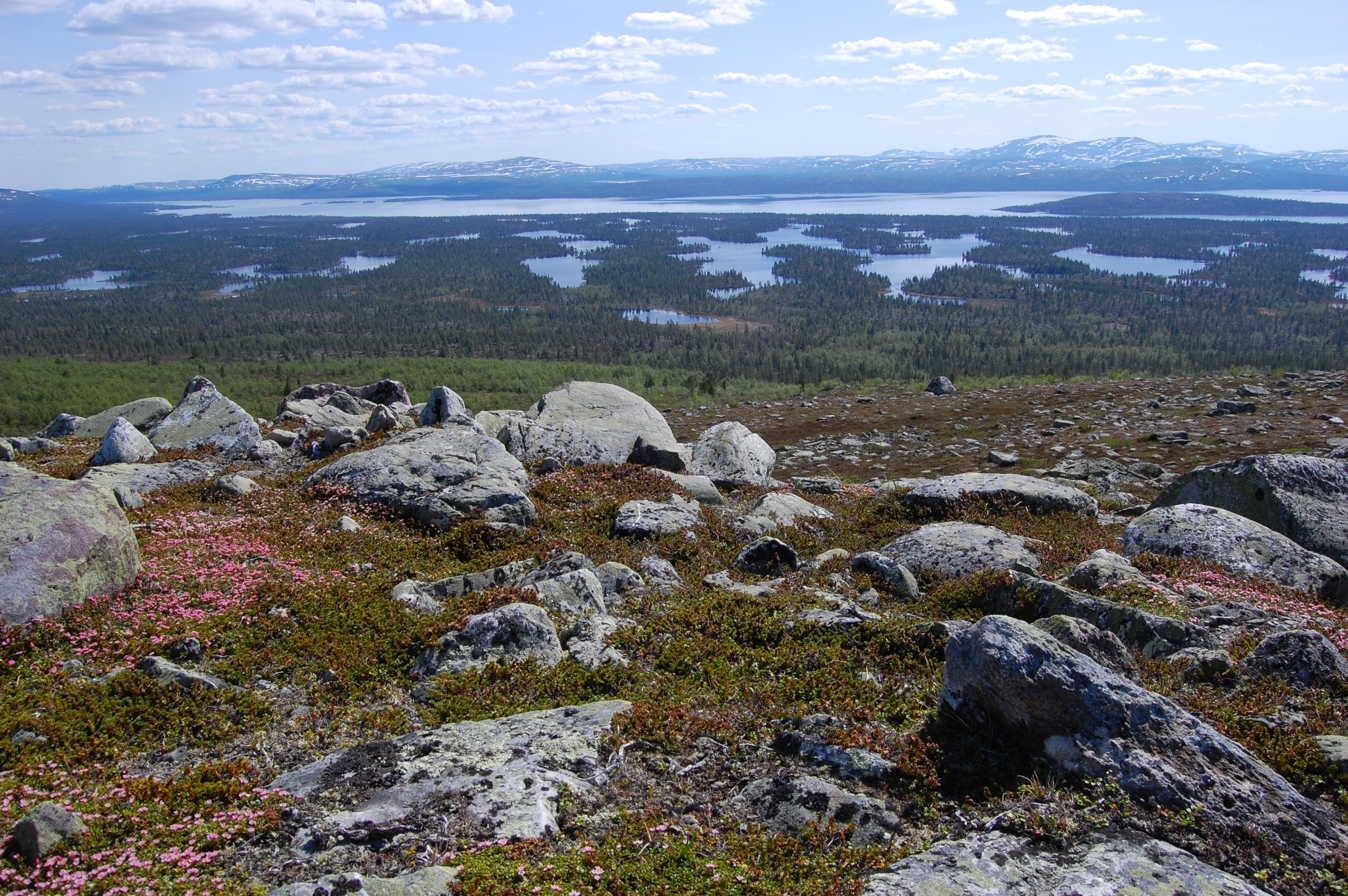

- Location within Jämtland Location within Sweden
- Location: Sweden
- Nearest city: Sveg
- Coordinates: 62°19′N 12°23′E
- Area: 500 km^{2} (120,000 acres)
- Established: 1976

Rogen Nature Reserve (Swedish: Rogens naturreservat) is a nature reserve in Jämtland County in Sweden. It is part of the EU-wide Natura 2000-network.

The nature reserve is centred on Lake Rogen and is part of a wider network of nature protection areas that extend also on the other side of the border with Norway. The landscape is distinctly characterised by Rogen moraine, a type of moraine named after the area. It consists of long, sinuous low hills interspersed with long lakes. In addition, large erratic boulders are spread over the land. In all directions, mountain tops — parts of the Scandinavian Mountains — rise to about 1,000 m (3,300 ft). The highest peak in the area is Brattriet with an altitude of 1,200 m (3,900 ft). The landscape was formed during the last Ice age, and has been described as "labyrinthine".

== Fauna ==
The nature reserve has a rich fauna. European otter, Eurasian lynx, brown bear and wolverine all inhabit the nature reserve. Birds such as golden eagle, black-throated loon, rough-legged buzzard and osprey have all been seen here. The waters of the many lakes are furthermore rich in fish (fishing licenses can be acquired by visitors); species found here include brown trout, burbot, grayling, charr, perch and northern pike. The nature reserve contains Sweden's entire population of wild muskoxen. This small herd (in 2010 it totalled seven animals) traces its origins to animals which were introduced to Norway from Greenland in the mid-20th century. In 1971, some of these animals crossed the border into Sweden. Visitors are only allowed to approach the animals to within 100 m (330 ft). The nature reserve is also used as grazing ground for reindeer.

== Flora ==
The flora is less diverse; the barren land is dominated by species such as Scots pine, cowberry, bilberry and wolf lichen.

== Historical sites ==
Within the nature reserve, there are several remains from earlier human activity. These include pits for trapping reindeer of unknown age as well as settlements and graves dating from the Stone Age.
