= Engerdal (village) =

Village in Engerdal Municipality, Norway

Engerdal Engerdalen
- Village
- View of Engerdal from the south with the lake Litle Engeren visible in the north
- Interactive map of Engerdal; Engerdalen
- Location within Innlandet Location within Norway
- Coordinates: 61.75904°N 11.95938°E
- Country: Norway
- Region: Eastern Norway
- County: Innlandet
- District: Østerdalen
- Municipality: Engerdal Municipality
- Elevation: 552 m (1,811 ft)
- Time zone: UTC+01:00 (CET)
  - Summer (DST): UTC+02:00 (CEST)
- Post Code: 2440 Engerdal

Engerdal or Engerdalen is the administrative centre of Engerdal Municipality in Innlandet county, Norway. The village is located along the Norwegian County Road 26 in the Engerdalen valley, just less than 10 kilometres (6.2 mi) west of the border with Sweden. The lake Litle Engeren lies on the north side of the village. Engerdal Church is located in the village. The village of Drevsjø lies about 20 kilometres (12 mi) to the northeast of this village.
