= Gutulia National Park =

National park in Norway

- IUCN category II (national park)

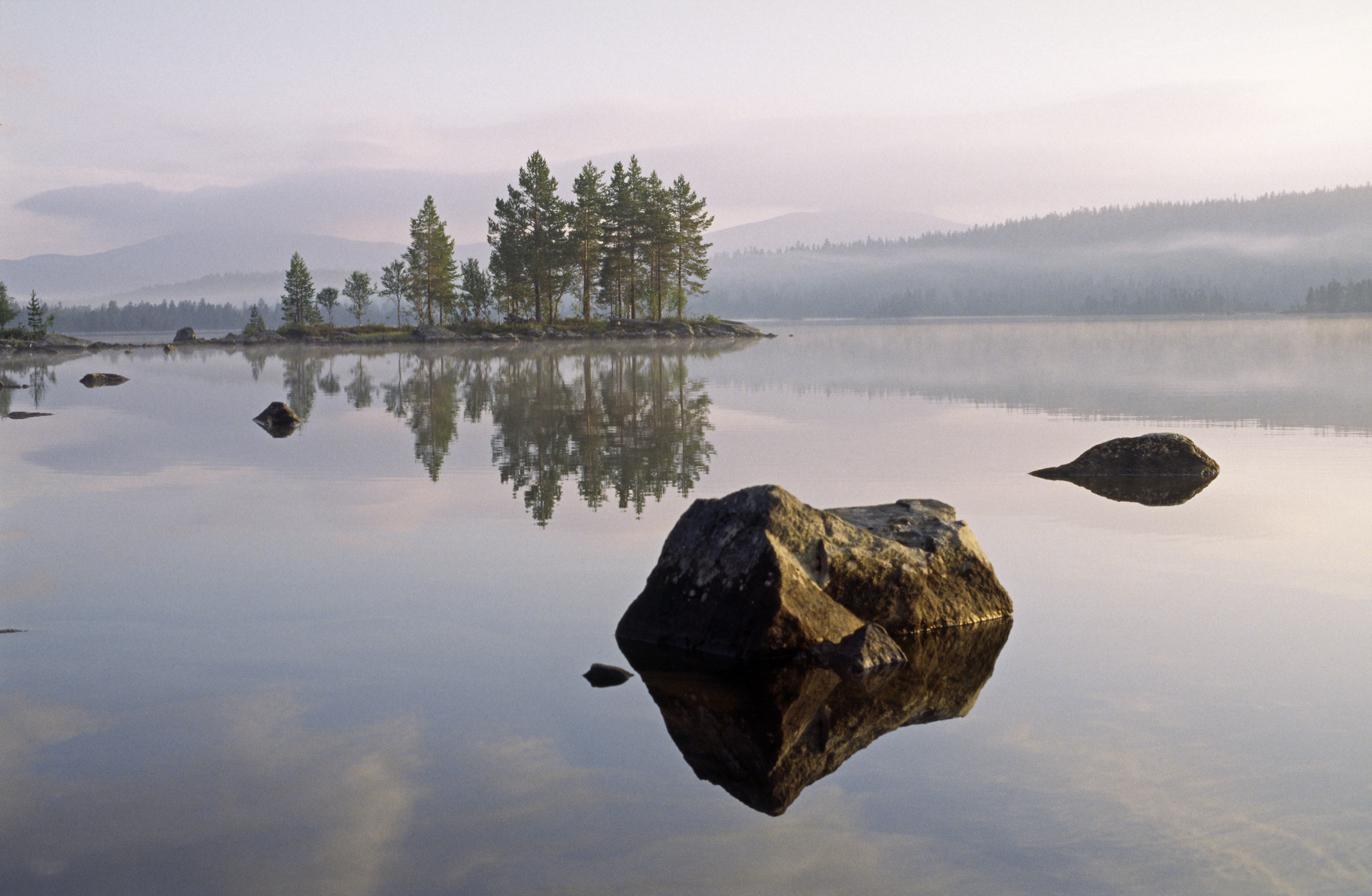
- Interactive map of Gutulia National Park
- Location: Innlandet, Norway
- Nearest city: Røros
- Coordinates: 62°1′N 12°10′E
- Area: 23 km^{2} (8.9 sq mi)
- Established: 1968
- Governing body: Directorate for Nature Management

Gutulia National Park (Norwegian: Gutulia nasjonalpark) is a national park in Engerdal Municipality in Innlandet county, Norway. It was established in 1968, and is Norway's smallest national park.

== Name ==
The name Gutulia comes from the dialect word guttu, meaning road, and li, which is a forest covered slope. Other places close by have similar names, like lake Fjellgutusjøen or the river Gutua. The frozen lakes and river were used by merchants travelling with horse and sledge, for example towards Røros for the annual market Rørosmartnan, giving rise to the name.

== Aim of protection ==
Gutulia is protected as a national park first and foremost in order to:

- preserve a large, connected and mostly untouched forests, marshes, and mountains,
- protect the natural biodiversity, with its unique plant- and animal life,
- protect cultural monuments.

The area is available to traditional Sami reindeer herding.

In order to take care of the nature and cultural sites of Femundsmarka national park, it's not allowed to collect dead wood. Visitors are only permitted to use twigs for campfires, preferably twigs that are found on the ground. Cycling, horseback riding, flying with drones, and motorised vehicles are also prohibited unless special premits are granted.

== Old-growth forest and biodiversity ==
Siberian jay photographed in the area around lake Femunden, close to Gutulia and Femundsmarka national parks

Gutulia is widely known for its old-growth and primeval forests, meaning most of the park hasn't been subjected to logging. Older forests offer a huge variety of niches, and support a wider biodiversity than forests managed by the logging industry. Gutulia is therefore home to many threathened species of fungi, lichens, plants, and animals. Characteristic species one might encounter include siberian jays, Eurasian three-toed woodpeckers, wolf lichens, tiny caliciales lichens, and polypores such as lach mazegill and rose bracket.

Larch mazegill growing on a dead spruce next to the trail leading to Gutulisetra mountain farm.

Gutulia has numerous times been subjected to natural forest fires, and therefore houses species connected to fire ecology. In 2026 the national park management conducted a controlled forest fire in a small area at the north end of Gutulisjøen lake, in order create habitat for pyrophile species.

Wild reindeer went extinct in the area around 1880, but one can still meet domesticated reindeer belonging to the Southern Sámi.

== Cultural monuments and landscapes ==
Nedpåvollen - one of the buildings in Gutulia national park.

In stark contrast to the old-growth and primeval forests lies Gutulisetra mountain farm with pastures and old, restored houses. The three mountain pastures of Gutulisetra are Nedpåvollen, Oppåvollen, and Lillebovollen, each originally belonging to separate local farms from Sorken and Lillebo. The three mountain farms were in use during the summers from 1750 to 1949. After the area and the mountain farms were protected, large scale restoration of the 16 buildings were conducted between the years of 1975 and 1983.

The whole area in and around Gutulia are grazing areas for domestic reindeer, belonging to the Southern Sámi reindeer owners of Svahken sitje - Norway's southernmost Sámi reindeer herding district. Though the domestic reindeer are less shy than wild reindeer, one should still show consideration.

== Tourism ==
Originally used as a summer farm, Gutulisetra is now a popular tourist attraction. During the summer holidays one can buy Norwegian pancakes and coffee at Nedpåvollen, and there are often guided tours arranged by the national park management. The buiding Ostebua is an open shelter where hikers can spend the night and experience a small exhibition about the old use of the farm. A signed adventure trail leads from Gutulisetra and into the forest, and is the only marked trail within the national park.

Visitor Centre National Park Femundsmarka Gutulia is authorised by the Norwegian Environment Agency, and is run by a local foundation.

Both Gutulia and Femundsmarka national parks are represented by Visitor Centre National Park Femundsmarka Gutulia in the hamlet of Elgå, a short distance north of Gutulia. The centre offers tourist information, a museum, a souvenir shop, and free educational programs for schools and kindergartens.
