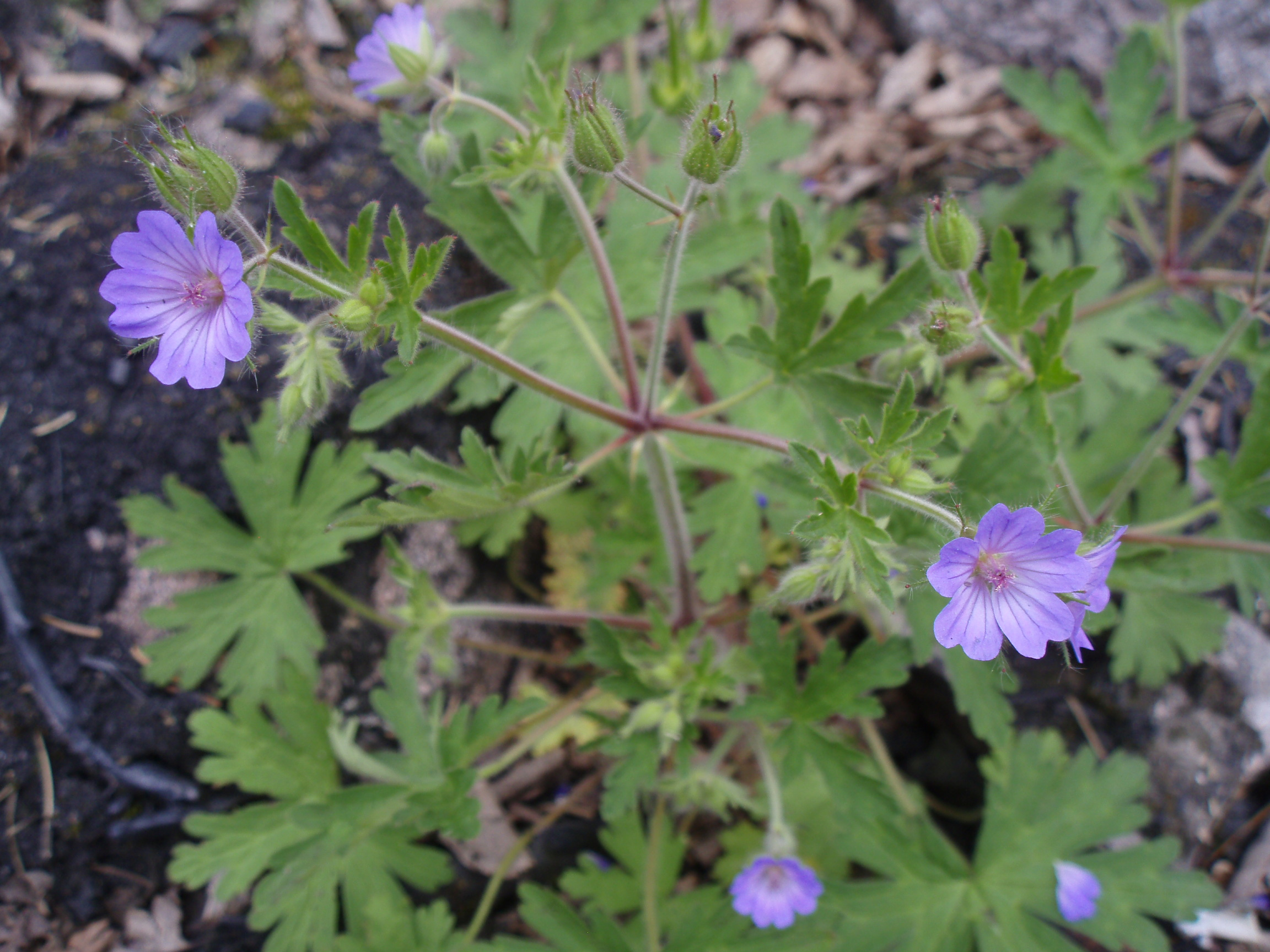

Scientific classification
- Kingdom: Plantae
- Clade: Tracheophytes
- Clade: Angiosperms
- Clade: Eudicots
- Clade: Rosids
- Order: Geraniales
- Family: Geraniaceae
- Genus: Geranium
- Species: G. bohemicum

Binomial name
- Geranium bohemicum L.

= Geranium bohemicum =

Species of flowering plant

Geranium bohemicum is a species of flowering plant belonging to the family Geraniaceae. It was first described in 1756 by Carl Linnaeus.

Its native range is Europe to Caucasus.
