= MS Fæmund II =

Passenger ferry

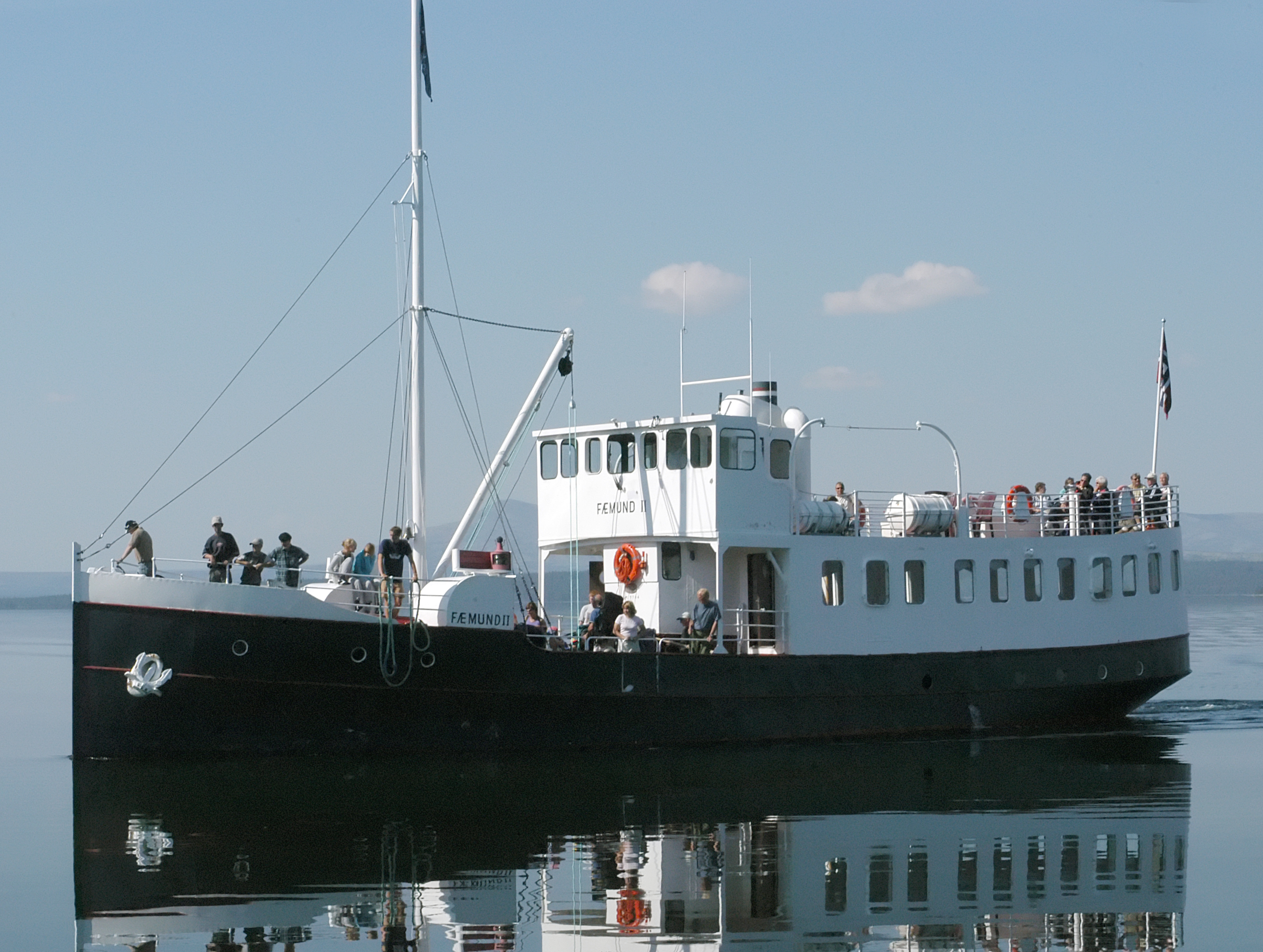
- Fæmund II in 2004

History

Norway
Name	Fæmund II
Owner	A/S Fæmund, Røros, Norway
In service	1905
Identification	IMO number: 8962216
Status	in active service, as of 2016

General characteristics
Type	Passenger ferry
Length	82 ft (25 m)
Depth	6 ft (1.8 m)
Propulsion	Steam engine (1905); 160 hp (119 kW) diesel engine (1958)
Capacity	100 passengers

Name pennant of the Fæmund II, usually flown from the ferry's mast

MS Fæmund II is a historic passenger ferry that each summer travels between Sørvika (in Røros Municipality) and Elgå (in Engerdal Municipality) on Norway's third largest lake, Femunden.

== General information ==
From 1905 the steamship has transported goods, post, people and lumber. Since there are still no road connection to some houses, the boat is still important for many inhabitants. While the main income in the past was the freight of lumber and heavy cargoes the boat today is mainly used as a ferry, to transport the many tourists seeking the national parks to go hiking.

== History ==
For the last 17 years, the steamship has sailed its way through Femunden with its dark coloured hull. But, in 2009 the boat company and owner of the steamship decided to paint the whole boat white. Today, the steamship is in its original colour.

In 1958 the old steam engine was replaced with a diesel engine.

== Facilities ==
The boat holds 100 passengers and has service on board. The boat operates between 15 June and mid-September.
