= Drevsjø =

Village in Engerdal Municipality, Norway

- Village
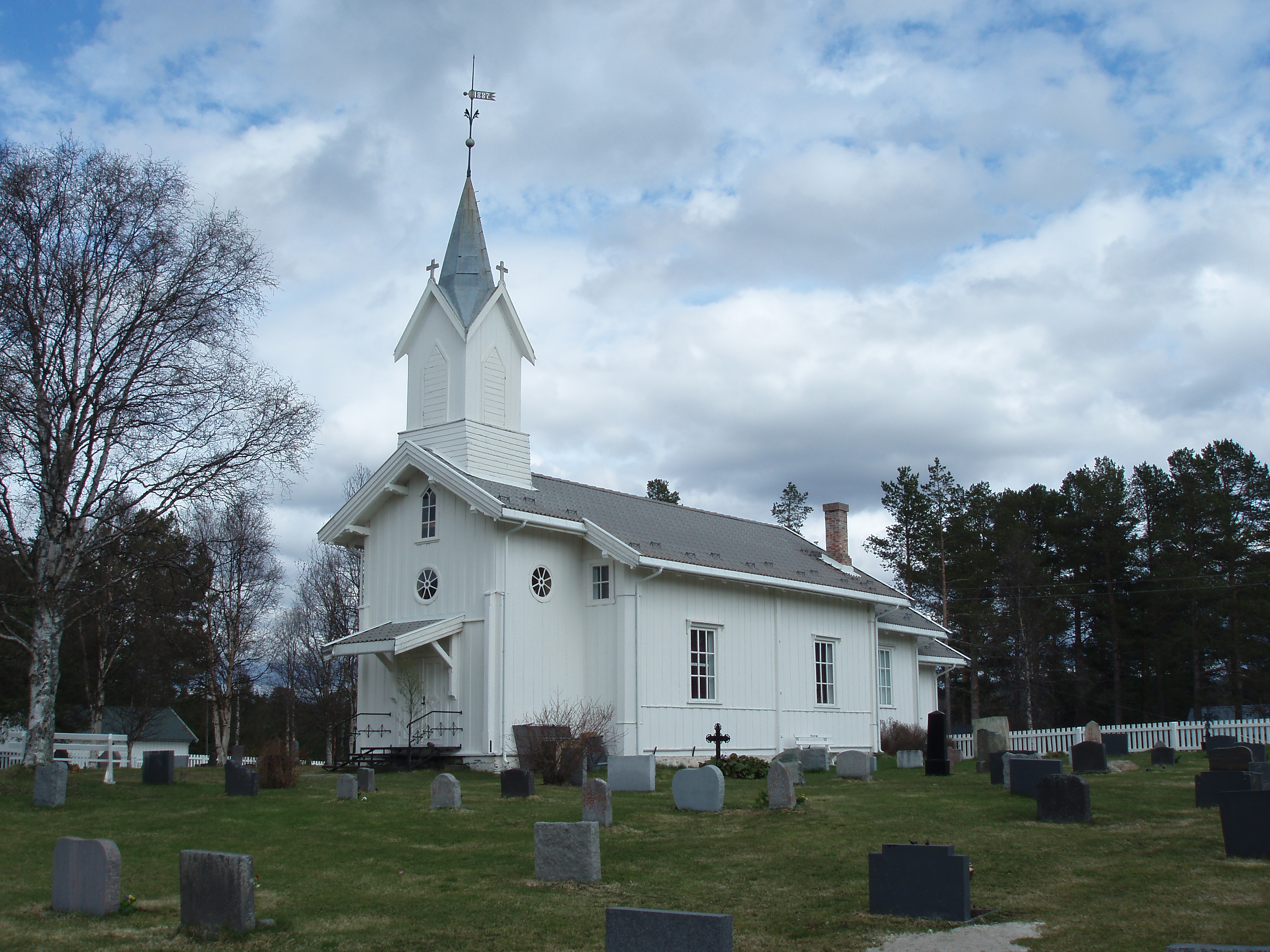
- View of the village
- Interactive map of Drevsjø
- Location within Innlandet Location within Norway
- Coordinates: 61.89012°N 12.02901°E
- Country: Norway
- Region: Eastern Norway
- County: Innlandet
- District: Østerdalen
- Municipality: Engerdal Municipality

Area
  - Total: 0.47 km^{2} (0.18 sq mi)
- Elevation: 674 m (2,211 ft)

Population (2024)
  - Total: 306
  - Density: 651/km^{2} (1,690/sq mi)
- Time zone: UTC+01:00 (CET)
  - Summer (DST): UTC+02:00 (CEST)
- Post Code: 2443 Drevsjø

Drevsjø is a village in Engerdal Municipality in Innlandet county, Norway. It is located about 16 kilometres (9.9 mi) north of the village of Engerdalen and about 12 kilometres (7.5 mi) southeast of the village of Sorken. The village takes its name from the lake Drevsjø which lies near the village. The Drevsjø Church is located in the village. The village has some commercial businesses serving the municipality such as grocery stores plus a large sawmill.

The 0.47-square-kilometre (120-acre) village has a population (2024) of 306 and a population density of 651 inhabitants per square kilometre (1,690/sq mi).

Drevsjø is well known for its natural environment and its fishing opportunities. It is only 60 minutes from one of Scandinavia's biggest alpine centres, Trysilfjellet. The village has several recreational facilities including a tennis court, football pitch, and a car racing track. The village is the site of the Blokkodden Villmarksmuseum, an open-air museum presenting the history of the use of the natural world since the 18th century.

The village has several municipal and state institutions including nursing homes and health centres. Since 1990, the village has also had a reception centre for asylum seekers in Norway.

== Climate ==
Drevsjø has a subarctic climate (Dfc) with only 3 months with a mean temperature above 11 °C (52 °F). There is a wetter period from June to September and a dry period from December to April.

Climate data for Drevsjø : 672m (1991−2020)
Month	Jan	Feb	Mar	Apr	May	Jun	Jul	Aug	Sep	Oct	Nov	Dec	Year
Mean daily maximum °C (°F)	−4.2 (24.4)	−2.9 (26.8)	0.7 (33.3)	5.3 (41.5)	11.1 (52.0)	15.6 (60.1)	18.5 (65.3)	16.6 (61.9)	11.9 (53.4)	5.1 (41.2)	−0.3 (31.5)	−3.6 (25.5)	6.2 (43.1)
Daily mean °C (°F)	−8.8 (16.2)	−8.5 (16.7)	−5.0 (23.0)	0.2 (32.4)	5.6 (42.1)	10.0 (50.0)	12.8 (55.0)	11.2 (52.2)	7.0 (44.6)	1.4 (34.5)	−3.8 (25.2)	−7.9 (17.8)	1.2 (34.1)
Mean daily minimum °C (°F)	−14.0 (6.8)	−14.5 (5.9)	−11.1 (12.0)	−5.2 (22.6)	−0.4 (31.3)	4.1 (39.4)	6.9 (44.4)	6.0 (42.8)	2.5 (36.5)	−2.2 (28.0)	−7.7 (18.1)	−12.7 (9.1)	−4.1 (24.6)
Average precipitation mm (inches)	34.0 (1.34)	26.3 (1.04)	25.2 (0.99)	26.7 (1.05)	56.9 (2.24)	72.0 (2.83)	85.3 (3.36)	87.6 (3.45)	57.9 (2.28)	51.4 (2.02)	42.2 (1.66)	31.9 (1.26)	597.4 (23.52)
Average precipitation days (≥ 1.0 mm)	15	12	12	14	18	19	22	19	15	15	14	14	189
Source: NOAA

Climate data for Drevsjø 1961-1990, extremes 1948-2015
Month	Jan	Feb	Mar	Apr	May	Jun	Jul	Aug	Sep	Oct	Nov	Dec	Year
Record high °C (°F)	8.2 (46.8)	10.4 (50.7)	13.4 (56.1)	17.9 (64.2)	24.5 (76.1)	29.0 (84.2)	28.7 (83.7)	29.2 (84.6)	25.0 (77.0)	20.0 (68.0)	11.7 (53.1)	8.0 (46.4)	29.2 (84.6)
Mean daily maximum °C (°F)	−6.9 (19.6)	−4.7 (23.5)	−0.6 (30.9)	3.5 (38.3)	10.5 (50.9)	15.9 (60.6)	17.0 (62.6)	15.7 (60.3)	10.4 (50.7)	5.2 (41.4)	−1.6 (29.1)	−5.2 (22.6)	4.9 (40.9)
Mean daily minimum °C (°F)	−17.3 (0.9)	−16.5 (2.3)	−12.7 (9.1)	−6.9 (19.6)	−0.5 (31.1)	4.3 (39.7)	6.0 (42.8)	5.1 (41.2)	1.9 (35.4)	−2.0 (28.4)	−9.7 (14.5)	−15.3 (4.5)	−5.3 (22.5)
Record low °C (°F)	−47.0 (−52.6)	−43.9 (−47.0)	−39.5 (−39.1)	−28.7 (−19.7)	−17.8 (0.0)	−6.0 (21.2)	−3.0 (26.6)	−4.3 (24.3)	−10.6 (12.9)	−28.0 (−18.4)	−33.3 (−27.9)	−44.3 (−47.7)	−47.0 (−52.6)
Average precipitation mm (inches)	28 (1.1)	22 (0.9)	25 (1.0)	29 (1.1)	44 (1.7)	70 (2.8)	86 (3.4)	80 (3.1)	67 (2.6)	47 (1.9)	38 (1.5)	34 (1.3)	570 (22.4)
Average precipitation days	8.3	6.5	6.8	6.6	9.0	10.8	12.4	11.7	10.7	9.4	9.2	9.4	110.8
Source: Met Norway Eklima
