= Femunden =

Lake in Trøndelag and Innlandet, Norway

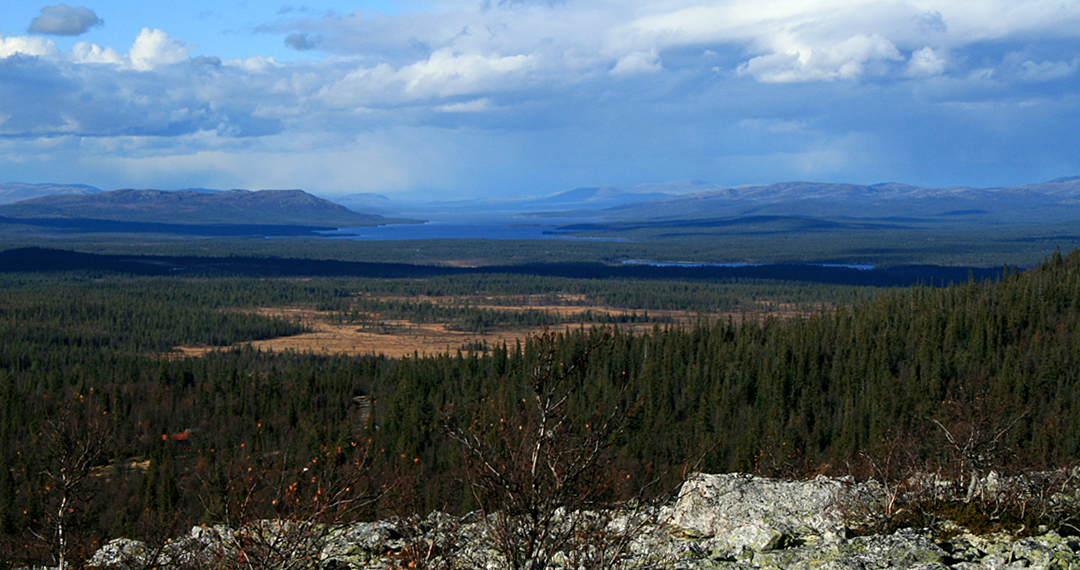
- Interactive map of the lake
- Location: Innlandet and Trøndelag
- Coordinates: 62°12′N 11°52′E
- Type: glacier mountain lake
- Primary outflows: Gløta
- Catchment area: 1,793.94 km^{2} (692.64 sq mi)
- Basin countries: Norway
- Max. length: 60 km (37 mi)
- Max. width: 9 km (5.6 mi)
- Surface area: 203.4 km^{2} (78.5 sq mi)
- Average depth: 29.5 m (97 ft)
- Max. depth: 150 m (490 ft)
- Water volume: 6.04 km^{3} (1.45 cu mi)
- Shore length^{1}: 234.92 km (145.97 mi)
- Surface elevation: 662 m (2,172 ft)
- Islands: Store Sollerøya
- References: NVE
- ^{1} Shore length is not a well-defined measure.

Femunden is Norway's third largest lake and the second largest natural lake in Norway. It is located in Innlandet and Trøndelag counties in Norway, just 13 km (8.1 mi) west of the border with Sweden. The lake lies primarily in Engerdal Municipality (in Innlandet) and also smaller parts are located in Os Municipality (Innlandet) and Røros Municipality (Trøndelag). Femundsmarka National Park borders the northeastern part of the lake.

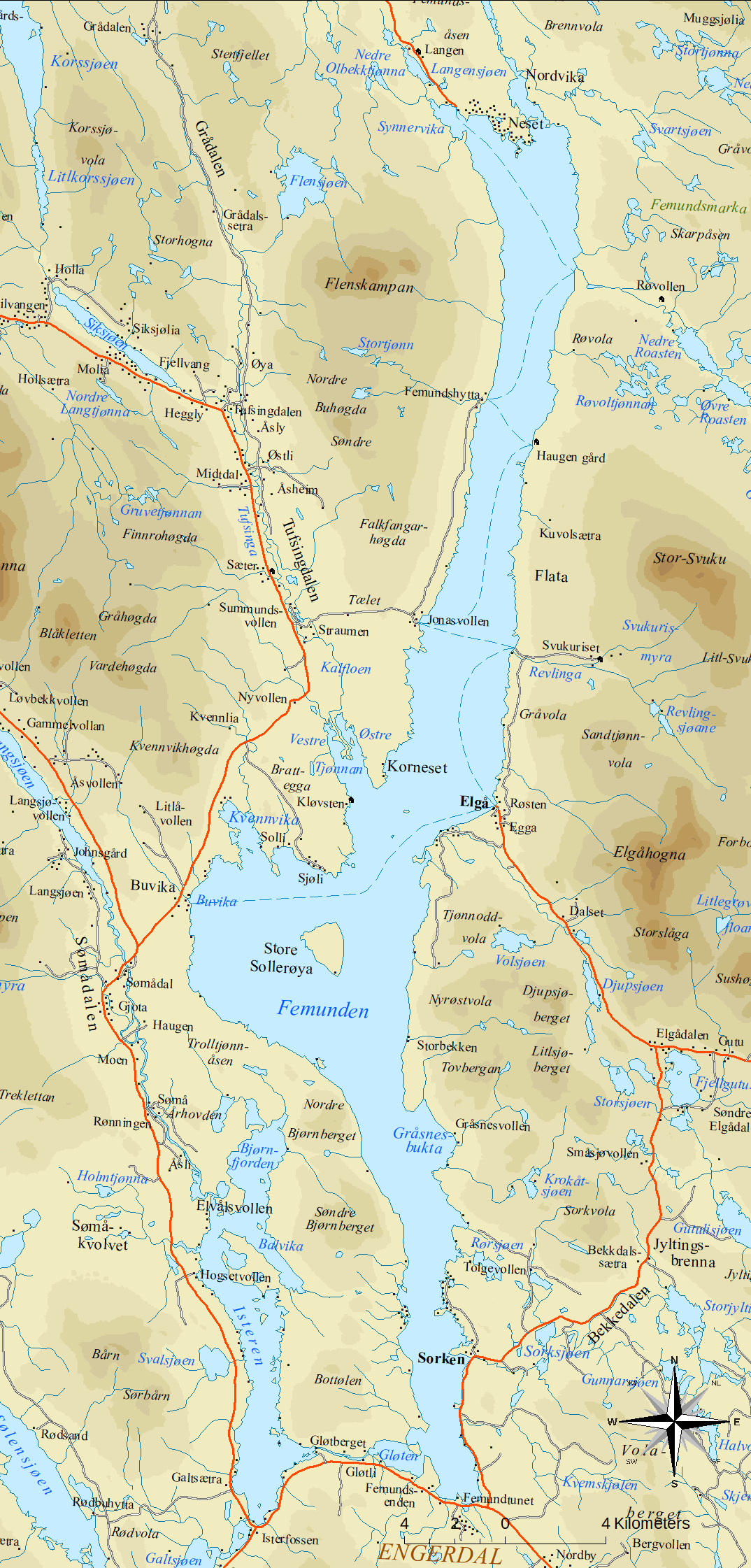
Map of Femund

The 203.4-square-kilometre (78.5 sq mi) lake holds about 6 km^{3} (1.4 cu mi) of water and reaches a maximum depth of 150 m (490 ft). The surface of the lake sits about 662 m (2,172 ft) above sea level.

== Name ==
The first element (Fe- or Fem-) has no known meaning, and the last element is the suffix -mund or -und (both are common in Norwegian place names). The final part -en is the definite article in the Norwegian language.

== History ==
After Sweden had conquered the parishes of Idre and Särna in 1644, the lake Femunden was considered to be part of the border between Norway and Sweden. But this was never officially recognised by the Dano-Norwegian government (since Norway was ruled from Copenhagen in the early modern age), and during border adjustments in 1751 the Femundsmarka area east of the lake was granted to Norway from Sweden.

The new (and current) border from 1751 is quite special: For a length of 61 kilometres (38 mi), it makes a completely straight line between the summits of the 1,002-metre (3,287 ft) tall mountain Våndsjögusten and the 1,185-metre (3,888 ft) tall mountain Østerhogna. Straight-line national borders are very unusual in Scandinavia, except in the very northernmost parts.

== See also ==
- List of lakes in Norway
- MS Fæmund II
