= Battle of Matrand =

Part of the Swedish–Norwegian War of 1814

- Part of the Swedish–Norwegian War of 1814
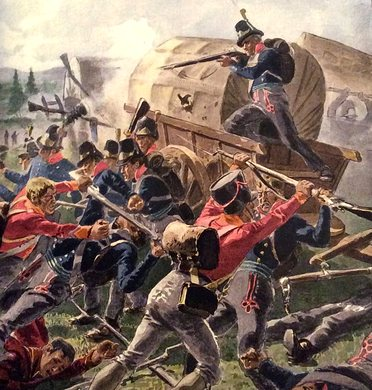
- Combat at Skotterud, by Andreas Bloch
Date	5 August 1814
Location	Matrand, Eidskog, Norway 60°02′N 12°08′E
Result	Norwegian victory

Belligerents
Norway	Sweden

Commanders and leaders
(Norway) Andreas Krebs	Carl Gahn

Strength
2,500–3,822; 6 guns	1,200–1,400; 6 guns

Casualties and losses
50 killed 60 wounded 36 captured	60 killed 288 captured and or wounded

War of the Sixth Coalition:
Swedish–Norwegian War (1814)
The color black indicates the current battle.

The Battle of Matrand (Norwegian: Slaget ved Matrand) was a military battle on 5 August 1814 between Norwegian and Swedish forces as part of the Swedish-Norwegian War of 1814. The battle took place near the villages of Matrand and Skotterud in Eidskog. It was the bloodiest battle of the entire war, in which the Swedes lost over 340 men, of which 270 were captured; the Norwegians lost around 50 men with 60 wounded and 36 captured.

== Background ==
After the defeat at Lier the Swedish army retreated first to Malmer and from there back to Matrand, where the rest of the army was stationed. At Matrand they took care of the wounded and it is said that they used the local church there as a field hospital.

At Matrand, Major General Carl Pontus Gahn (1759–1825) would let the troops rest and resupply themselves with new ammunition, before they again should attempt an offensive towards Kongsvinger Fortress in Hedmark. But on 4 August, Gahn received a message that Norwegian reinforcements were sent from Høland to Kongsvinger in order to reinforce the Norwegian positions. Gahn therefore decided to withdraw back across the border to Sweden instead of attempting an offensive.

=== Norwegian Plan ===
From Norwegian farmers who visited the Swedish camp at Matrand, Lt. Colonel Andreas Samuel Krebs (1766- 1818) had received reliable information about the Swedish plans. When he got the message that Gahn intended to march his troops back across the border, he decided to strike against the Swedish in the early morning of August the 5th.

=== Norwegian forces ===
- Trondheim Regiment (1,200 men)
- Odal's company (260 men)
- Solør's company (220 men)
- Nes's company (260 men)
- Vinger's company (260 men)
- Elverum, Solør and Åmot's skiers (750 men)
- Eidsvoll's company (260 men)
- Artillery (190 men; 6 guns)
- Mounted jägers (22 men)
- Sharpshooters (400 men)

Reserve:

- Akershus's grenadiers (650 men)

Total: 2,500–3,822 men (not including the reserve)

=== Swedish forces ===
- Västerbotten Regiment; 3 infantry and 1 jäger battalion
- Värmland Regiment; 1 infantry battalion
- 6 guns

Total: 1,200–1,400 men

== The Battle ==
On 4 August, Krebs started his march against the Swedish forces at Matrand. The troops marched together to Åbogen in Hedmark where Captain Dons, with about 1,000 men, was sent to Pramhus, from where he could attack the enemy from behind at Skotterud. Lt. Colonel Krebs with his remaining troops continued to Malmer, where he sent off 250 men to Skinpungrud to attack the enemy flanks. The rest of his troops continued on to Matrand, but it was a weak force of only about 700–800 men.

The Norwegian and Swedish vanguards met quickly close to Matrand, and the Swedes were forced to retreat to stronger defensive positions. There, the Swedish vanguard also got reinforced, and they managed to keep the Norwegian troops back for about an hour. Gahn used this opportunity to try to speed up the withdrawal and get the Swedish troops safely back behind the border, but they were eventually quickly pushed back towards the rest of the brigade, which had taken positions on both sides of the road, east of the river at Matrand.

After being reinforced by the column that had passed by Skinpungrud, Krebs' forces continued their advance under heavy fire. Krebs did, at this time, not know if Dons and his troops were in position at Skotterud, and for this reason he would not continue to move forward against the enemy. But after a while the Norwegians had grouped themselves so that they were about to encircle the Swedish defenders, and Gahn therefore decided to withdraw to Skotterud with one battalion and two cannons to keep the escape route open. While all this was going on, Captain Dons and his troops were on the march towards Skotterud. When they heard musket fire coming from Matrand, they were concerned that they would not arrive in time to take part in the battle and the last few kilometers they ran. Many of Dons' soldiers could not keep up and thus did not participate in the early stages of the attack on the withdrawing Swedes. When Dons' troops reached the main road at Ilag, which the Swedes used for their withdrawal, some Swedish supply troops were about to pass. Many of their horses were killed by the Norwegians so that the road was blocked for those who followed.

Dons had intended to create a roadblock by Ilag to prevent the Swedish withdrawal, but arrived too late for this. The Swedish forces were now under attack from two sides and were also about to run out of ammunition. Gahn saw that they would be captured unless they managed to break through Norwegian lines. With only their bayonets, the third battalion of the Västerbotten Regiment managed to penetrate the Norwegian lines, after several attacks, which allowed the Swedish force to retreat to Sweden. The Norwegians had lost 50 men killed, 60 wounded and 36 prisoners, most of which were captured as the Swedes broke out. The Swedes had 60 men killed and about 258 captured and or wounded. An additional 30 men, all wounded, made it back to the Swedish army at a later stage.

The battle had been very intense, and both sides were praised afterwards; the Swedes in particular were surprised by the Norwegian fighting spirit. The successful Swedish outbreak, from an otherwise hopeless situation, was foremost thanks due to the Västerbotten Regiment and the Swedish commander, Carl Pontus Gahn, who remained calm – despite being encircled by overwhelming numbers of enemies. This was not the first time Gahn had faced such difficulties; his entire Dala Battalion was forced to surrender in a similar situation, in 1808, in the Battle of Trangen.

== Aftermath ==
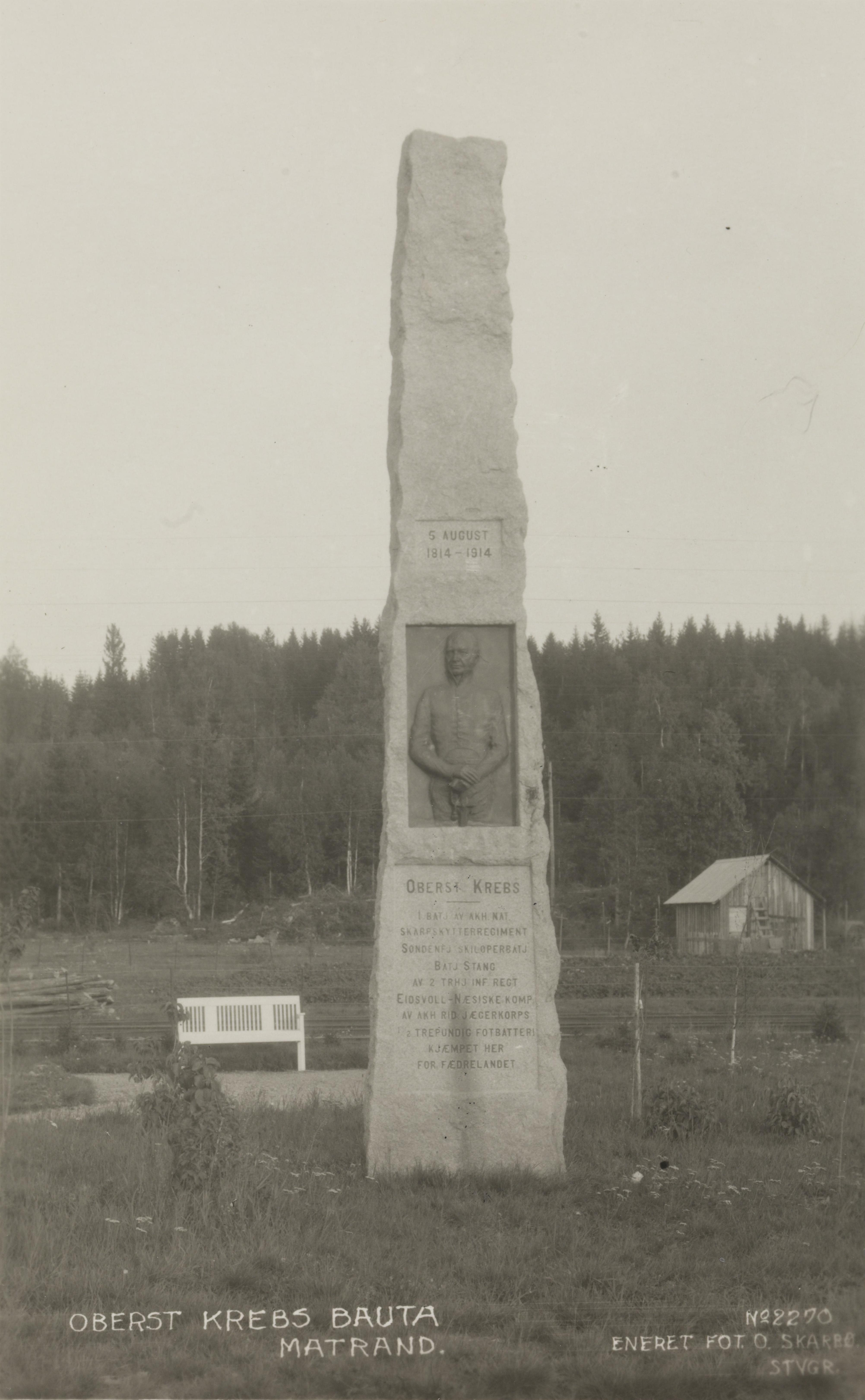
Monumental of Andreas Samuel Krebs

Lt. Colonel Krebs was hailed as a hero and promoted for the victory at Matrand as well as the prior Battle of Lier (Slaget på Lier). His victories were the only ones in an otherwise despondently led campaign. It obtained for the Norwegian envoys a valuable starting point for the negotiations leading to the Convention of Moss. The terms of that cease-fire required Norway to enter into a personal union with Sweden, while Sweden agreed to recognize the Constitution of Norway as an independent state, adopted by the Norwegian Constituent Assembly at Eidsvoll on 17 May 1814.
