= Same-sex marriage in Norway =

Same-sex marriage has been legal in Norway since 1 January 2009 when a gender-neutral marriage law came into force after being passed by the Storting in June 2008. Norway was the first Scandinavian country, the fourth in Europe, and the sixth in the world to legalize same-sex marriage, after the Netherlands, Belgium, Spain, Canada and South Africa. Polling suggests that a majority of Norwegians support the legal recognition of same-sex marriage. In 2024, a British wedding planning website named Norway the best marriage destination in the world for same-sex couples.

From 1993 to 2008, Norway allowed same-sex couples to enter into registered partnerships, which provided virtually all the protections, responsibilities and benefits of marriage. Norway was the second country in the world to provide some form of recognition to same-sex couples, after Denmark.

== Registered partnerships ==
=== Legislative action ===
Norway introduced same-sex registered partnerships on 1 August 1993. The law was introduced to the Storting on 11 January 1993 by the Ministry of Children and Family Affairs. It passed the lower house on 29 March, and the upper house on 1 April. King Harald V of Norway gave his royal assent on 30 April, and the law took effect on 1 August. Norway was the second country in the world to provide some form of recognition to same-sex couples, after Denmark which implemented a registered partnership law in 1989. Registered partnerships are known in Norwegian as registrert partnerskap (pronounced [rɛɡɪˈstreːʈ ˈpɑ̀ːʈnəʂkɑp]), and in Northern Sami as registrerejuvvon párragaskavuohta (pronounced [ˈrekiːˌstreːreˌjuvvon ˈpʰaːrraˌkasːkaˌvuo̯hta]). (Note: Lule Sami: registardum guojmmevuohta; Southern Sami: tjaalasovveme guejmievoete; Kven: registreerattu parriisuhđet; Romani: registralime partnerimo)

Registered partnerships were granted virtually all the protections, responsibilities and benefits of marriage, including arrangements for the breakdown of the relationship. Initially, the partnership law stated that registered partners could not adopt, and that only married couples or opposite-sex cohabiting couples could access artificial insemination. In June 2001, however, the Storting approved a bill allowing registered partners to adopt their partner's children (i.e. stepchild adoption). The amendment took effect on 1 January 2002. One of the more notable people to enter into a registered partnership was Finance Minister Per-Kristian Foss in 2002.

On 1 January 2009, the ability to enter into a registered partnership was closed off. Couples may retain their status as registered partners or convert their union into a marriage.

=== Statistics ===
From 1993 to 2008, 1,485 partnerships between men and 1,233 partnerships between women were registered in Norway.

== Same-sex marriage ==
Laws regarding same-sex partnerships in Europe¹ Marriage Civil union Limited domestic recognition (cohabitation) Unrecognized Constitution limits marriage to opposite-sex couples ¹ May include recent laws or court decisions that have not yet entered into effect.

=== Legislative action ===
A bill was proposed on 18 November 2004 by two MPs from the Socialist Left Party to abolish the existing registered partnership law, and make the marriage law gender-neutral. The move was withdrawn and replaced by a request that the cabinet further investigate the issue. The Conservative cabinet of that time did not look into the issue. However, the Stoltenberg's Second Cabinet announced a common, unified marriage act as part of its foundation document, the Declaration of Soria Moria (Soria Moria-erklæringen). A public hearing was opened on 16 May 2007.

On 14 March 2008, the Norwegian Government proposed a marriage bill that would give lesbian and gay couples the same rights as heterosexuals, including church weddings (although the law does not oblige any religious community to marry same-sex couples), full joint adoption rights and access to fertility treatments. The new legislation would amend the definition of civil marriage to make it gender-neutral. On 29 May, the Associated Press reported that two Norwegian opposition parties—the Liberal Party and the Conservative Party—had announced their support for the bill, securing its passage at the vote on 11 June 2008. Prior to this, there had been disagreements within the three-party governing coalition over whether the bill had enough support to pass. On 11 June, the lower house (Odelsting) approved the legislation by 83 votes to 41. Norway's upper house (Lagting) passed the bill with a 23–17 vote on 17 June. The King of Norway, Harald V, granted royal assent on 27 June 2008, and the law took effect on 1 January 2009. In addition to providing a gender-neutral definition of marriage, the law states that when a woman who is married to another woman becomes pregnant through artificial insemination, the other partner will have all the rights of parenthood "from the moment of conception".

11 June 2008 vote in the Odelsting
Party	Voted for	Voted against	Abstained or Absent (Did not vote)
G Labour Party	43: Marianne Aasen Agdestein; Olav Akselsen; Bendiks Arnesen; Karita Bekkemellem; Anne Bjørnflaten; Jan Bøhler; Thomas Breen; Lise Christoffersen; Gunvor Eldegard; Eirin Faldet; Gunn Gjul; Steinar Gullvåg; Tore Hagebakken; Eva Hansen; Sigvald Oppebøen Hansen; Svein Hansen; Arne Haugen; Ingrid Heggø; Per Henriksen; Britt Hildeng; Alf Jakobsen; Gorm Kjernli; Saera Khan; Asmund Kristoffersen; Anna Ljunggren; Inger Løite; Torgeir Micaelsen; Sverre Myrli; Tore Nordtun; Signe Øye; Torny Pedersen; Torstein Rudihagen; Freddy de Ruiter; Reidar Sandal; Ivar Skulstad; Hill-Marta Solberg; Unn Sørensen; Arild Stokkan-Grande; Tom Strømstad Olsen; Tom Thorvaldsen; Anette Trettebergstuen; Truls Wickholm; Karin Yrvin	–	17: Terje Aasland; Jorodd Asphjell; Vidar Bjørnstad; Berit Brørby; Sigrun Eng; Ann-Kristin Engstad; Irene Johansen; Espen Johnsen; Tove Knutsen; Gerd Kristoffersen; Hilde Magnusson Lydvo; Sonja Mandt-Bartholsen; Marianne Marthinsen; Gunn Olsen; Tor-Arne Strøm; Eirin Sund; Dag Teigen
Progress Party	–	29: Per-Willy Amundsen; Torbjørn Andersen; Anders Anundsen; Hans Kielland Asmyhr; Jan Ellingsen; Robert Eriksson; Per Evensen; Kåre Fostervold; Jan-Henrik Fredriksen; Jon Jæger Gåsvatn; Carl Hagen; Gjermund Hagesæter; Morten Høglund; Solveig Horne; Siv Jensen; Ulf Knudsen; Øyvind Korsberg; Ulf Leirstein; Tord Lien; Harald Nesvik; Per Sandberg; Henning Skumsvoll; Ketil Solvik-Olsen; Arne Sortevik; Åge Starheim; Kenneth Svendsen; Ib Thomsen; Christian Tybring-Gjedde; Karin Woldseth	9: Per Bredvold; Bård Hoksrud; Kari Kjønaas Kjos; Thore Nistad; Jørund Rytman; Åse Schmidt; Lodve Solholm; Øyvind Vaksdal; Per Width
Conservative Party	15: Elisabeth Aspaker; André Dahl; Martin Engeset; Ine Eriksen Søreide; Svein Flåtten; Per-Kristian Foss; Peter Skovholt Gitmark; Torbjørn Hansen; Trond Helleland; Bent Høie; Elisabeth Røbekk Nørve; Sonja Sjøli; Erna Solberg; Jan Sanner; Olemic Thommessen	2: Ivar Kristiansen; Michael Momyr	6: Jan Petersen; Øyvind Halleraker; Wenche Høye; Kari Holmberg; Inge Lønning; Finn Vallersnes
G Socialist Left Party	11: Karin Andersen; Akhtar Chaudhry; Øystein Djupedal; Morten Drægni; Åsa Elvik; May Hansen; Lena Jensen; Inge Ryan; Kirsti Saxi; Inga Thorkildsen; Ågot Valle	–	4: Magnar Lund Bergo; Bjørn Jacobsen; Hallgeir Langeland; Rolf Reikvam
G Centre Party	6: Lars Brekk; Jenny Klinge; Trond Lode; Erling Sande; Dagfinn Sundsbø; Trygve Slagsvold Vedum	2: Per Lundteigen; Rune Skjælaaen	3: Ola Borten Moe; Johannes Rindal; Alf Samuelsen
Christian Democratic Party	–	8: Laila Dåvøy; Åse Woie Duesund; Dagrun Eriksen; Dagfinn Høybråten; Jan Sahl; Ingebrigt Sørfonn; Hans Syversen; Bjørg Tørresdal	3: May-Helen Molvær Grimstad; Line Holten Hjemdal; Ola Lånke
Liberal Party	8: Odd Dørum; Trine Skei Grande; Gunnar Kvassheim; Gunvald Ludvigsen; Vera Lysklætt; André Skjelstad; Lars Sponheim; Inge Solli	–	2: Leif Kongshaug; Anne Larsen
Total (Note: The Stortingspresident, Thorbjørn Jagland, votes only in case of a tied vote.)	83	41	44
Total	49.4%	24.4%	26.2%

The first same-sex couple to marry in Norway were Anfinn Bernaas and August Ringmann, who had been together for 25 years, at the Oslo Courthouse on 2 January 2009. Article 1 of the Marriage Act (Norwegian: Ekteskapsloven; Northern Sami: Náittosláhka) (Note: Lule Sami: Gállasjvuohtaláhka; Southern Sami: Ektievoetelaake; Kven: Naittustilalääki; Romani: Solaxarimasko) was amended to read: Two persons of the opposite or of the same sex can enter into marriage. (Note: Norwegian: To personer av motsatt eller samme kjønn kan inngå ekteskap.)

=== Royal same-sex weddings ===
In November 2021, Guri Varpe, the Royal Palace's communications manager, confirmed that members of the Norwegian royal family may enter into same-sex marriages without having to forfeit the crown, or lose their royal titles and privileges or their place in the line of succession. "The heir to the throne can marry whoever she or he wants. The marriage must be approved by the King [or Queen] in accordance with Article 36 of the Constitution. The heir to the throne's orientation is not mentioned in the Constitution's provisions on the throne, and the Constitution does not provide any legal guidelines for who the heir to the throne can marry", said Varpe.

=== Statistics ===
From 2009 to 2015, an average of 270 same-sex marriages were conducted per year, compared to an average of 127 registered partnerships annually between 1993 and 2008. In the first three years after same-sex marriage became legal, 754 partnerships were converted into marriages. Female couples were more likely to adopt children than male couples, as about 30% of married lesbian couples had children, compared to 72% of married heterosexual couples and 3% of married male couples.

By the end of 2025, 5,443 same-sex marriages had been performed in Norway. Figures for 2020 and 2021 are lower than previous years because of the restrictions in place due to the COVID-19 pandemic.

Number of marriages and divorces in Norway
Year	Same-sex marriages			Total marriages	Same-sex divorces			Total divorces
Year	Female	Male	Total	Total marriages	Female	Male	Total	Total divorces
2009	178	105	283	24,582	0	0	0	10,235
2010	167	97	264	23,577	3	1	4	10,228
2011	166	93	259	23,135	15	4	19	10,207
2012	167	102	269	24,346	17	6	23	9,929
2013	162	90	252	23,410	37	19	56	9,736
2014	163	106	269	22,887	38	12	50	9,556
2015	187	113	300	22,738	50	18	68	9,306
2016	157	121	278	22,537	57	21	78	9,345
2017	214	119	333	22,111	70	21	91	9,848
2018	192	139	331	20,949	55	25	80	9,545
2019	222	109	331	19,855	75	36	111	9,609
2020	155	92	247	16,151	69	40	109	9,355
2021	202	94	296	16,050	70	34	104	8,893
2022	261	173	434	20,769	63	28	91	8,204
2023	258	166	424	19,988	85	44	129	8,513
2024	263	186	449	21,136	93	47	140	8,474
2025	244	180	424	21,574	95	47	142	8,583

=== Religious performance ===
In 2014, the National Council of the Church of Norway rejected a proposal to perform same-sex marriages. However, the following year it voted to allow same-sex marriages to take place in its churches. The decision was ratified at the annual conference on 11 April 2016. The Church formally amended its marriage liturgy on 30 January 2017, replacing references to "bride and groom" with gender-neutral text. A same-sex couple, Kjell Frølich Benjaminsen and Erik Skjelnæs, were immediately married at the Eidskog Church in Matrand the moment the changes came into effect on 1 February 2017. Previously, a same-sex marriage had been performed in a Lutheran church in 1781. Jens Andersson, assigned female at birth but identifying as male, and Anne Kristine Mortensdotter were married in a church in Strømsø, Drammen. The priest later discovered that Andersson, born Marie Andersdotter, was in fact a biological female. After examination, Andersson was imprisoned, but later released after the death of Mortensdotter.

Other smaller religious organisations also bless and perform same-sex marriages, including Åsatrufellesskapet Bifrost, which has been conducting same-sex weddings since 2009, and the United Methodist Church in Norway since 2023. The Evangelical Lutheran Free Church of Norway opposes same-sex marriage and cohabitation. The Catholic Church does not perform same-sex marriages in its places of worship. In December 2023, the Holy See published Fiducia supplicans, a declaration allowing Catholic priests to bless couples who are not considered to be married according to church teaching, including the blessing of same-sex couples. The Bishop of Oslo, Bernt Ivar Eidsvig, released a statement on 20 December that "the doctrine of marriage is maintained, but it opens the door for priests to provide pastoral care for gay people."

== Public opinion ==
Five different polls conducted by Gallup Europe, Sentio, Synovate MMI, Norstat and YouGov in 2003, 2005, 2007, 2008, 2012 and 2013 concluded that 61%, 63%, 66%, 58%, 70% and 78%, respectively, of the Norwegian population supported a gender-neutral marriage law. A 2007 Ipsos MMI poll showed that 61% of Norwegians supported same-sex marriage, and 42% personally knew a gay person. This represented a large increase compared to 1998, when the numbers were 25% and 12% respectively.

A Pew Research Center poll, conducted between April and August 2017 and published in May 2018, showed that 72% of Norwegians supported same-sex marriage, 19% were opposed and 9% did not know or had refused to answer. When divided by religion, 83% of religiously unaffiliated people, 72% of non-practicing Christians and 42% of church-attending Christians supported same-sex marriage. Opposition was 14% among 18–34-year-olds.

== See also ==
- LGBT rights in Norway
- Recognition of same-sex unions in Europe
