= Magnor (disambiguation) =

Magnor may refer to:

== People ==
- Horst-Rüdiger Magnor (1942-2008), a German racewalker
- Ole Magnor (born 1998), a Norwegian mixed martial arts fighter

== Places ==
- Magnor, a village in the municipality of Eidskog in Innlandet county, Norway
- Magnor Church, a church in the municipality of Eidskog in Innlandet county, Norway

== Other ==
- Magnor Glassverk, a glass production company in the municipality of Eidskog in Innlandet county, Norway
- Magnor (band), a band
- The Mighty Magnor, a comic book series
