= Eidskog Municipality =

Municipality in Innlandet, Norway

Eidskog Municipality Eidskog kommune
- Municipality
- Eidskogen herred (historic name)
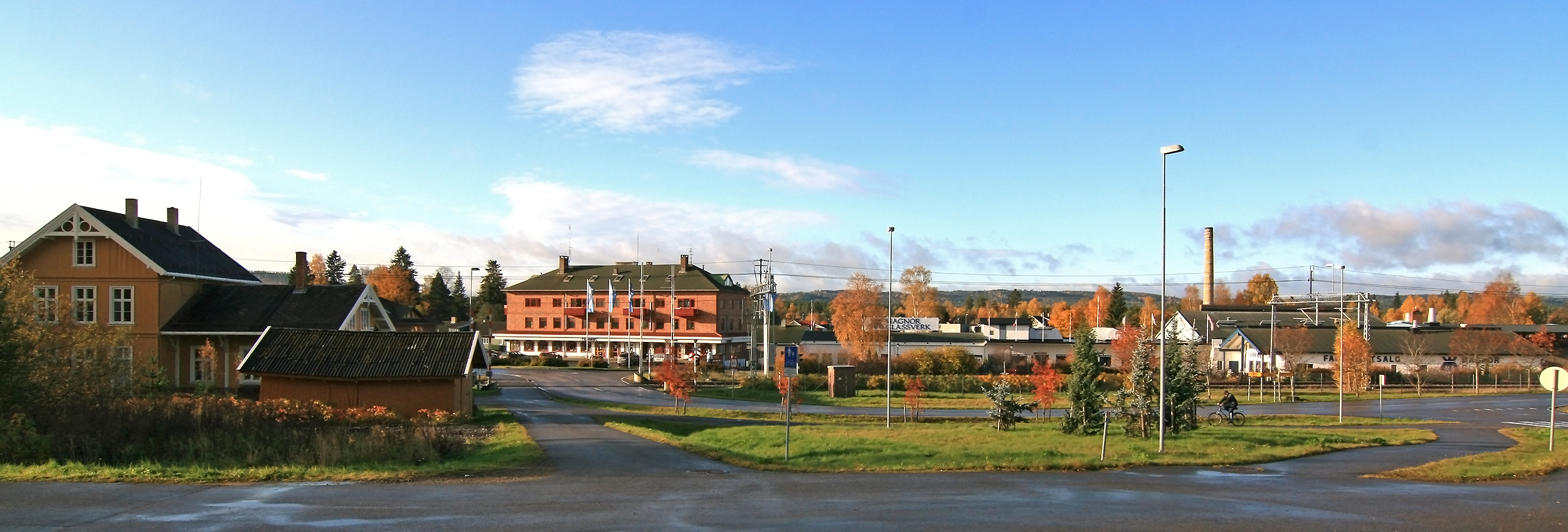
- View of Magnor

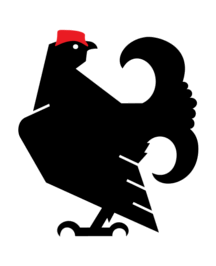
- Flag Coat of arms

- Innlandet within Norway

- Eidskog within Innlandet
- Coordinates: 59°59′53″N 12°3′38″E
- Country: Norway
- County: Innlandet
- District: Vinger / Glåmdal
- Established: 1 Jan 1864
  - Preceded by: Vinger Municipality
- Administrative centre: Skotterud

Government
  - Mayor (2015): Kamilla Thue (Ap)

Area
  - Total: 640.39 km^{2} (247.26 sq mi)
  - Land: 603.37 km^{2} (232.96 sq mi)
  - Water: 37.02 km^{2} (14.29 sq mi) 5.8%
  - Rank: #181 in Norway
- Highest elevation: 435 m (1,427 ft)

Population (2025)
  - Total: 6,059
  - Rank: #162 in Norway
  - Density: 9.5/km^{2} (25/sq mi)
  - Change (10 years): ▼ −3.4%
- Demonym: Eidskoging

Official language
  - Norwegian form: Bokmål
- Time zone: UTC+01:00 (CET)
  - Summer (DST): UTC+02:00 (CEST)
- ISO 3166 code: NO-3416
- Website: Official website

Eidskog is a municipality in Innlandet county, Norway. It is located in the traditional district of Vinger. The administrative centre of the municipality is the village of Skotterud. Other villages in the municipality include Magnor, Matrand, and Åbogen.

The 640-square-kilometre (250 sq mi) municipality is the 181st largest by area out of the 357 municipalities in Norway. Eidskog Municipality is the 162nd most populous municipality in Norway with a population of 6,059. The municipality's population density is 9.5 inhabitants per square kilometre (25/sq mi) and its population has decreased by 3.4% over the previous 10-year period.

== General information ==
The municipality was established on 1 January 1864 when the old Vinger Municipality was divided in two: Vinger Municipality (population: 6,226) in the north and Eidskog Municipality (population: 6,920) in the south. On 1 January 1986, the northern part of the Åbogen area (population: 14) was transferred from Kongsvinger Municipality to Eidskog Municipality.

Historically, the municipality was part of the old Hedmark county. On 1 January 2020, the municipality became a part of the newly-formed Innlandet county (after Hedmark and Oppland counties were merged).

=== Name ===
The municipality is named Eidskog (Old Norse: Eiðaskógr) since it was an old name for the area. The first element is the plural genitive case of eið which means "isthmus" or in this situation, a "path between two lakes". The first element is skógr which means "woods" or "forest". Thus the name means "the woods with the many eiðs". (In historical times, people traveled in small boats on the lakes and the rivers, but they had to drag the boats over the eids.) Historically, the name of the municipality was spelled Eidskogen. On 3 November 1917, a royal resolution changed the spelling of the name of the municipality to Eidskog, removing the definite form ending -en.

=== Coat of arms ===
The coat of arms was granted on 12 September 1986. The official blazon is "Argent, a grouse sable regardant crested gules" (Norwegian: I sølv en svart orrhane med hodet vendt bakover). This means the arms have a field (background) has a tincture of argent which means it is commonly colored white, but if it is made out of metal, then silver is used. The charge is a black grouse with a red comb. The design was chosen since this type of bird is a common inhabitant of the many forests in the municipality. Forestry is also one of the main sources of income in the area. The arms were designed by Stein Davidsen. The municipal flag has the same design as the coat of arms.

=== Churches ===
The Church of Norway has two parishes (sokn) within Eidskog Municipality. It is part of the Solør, Vinger og Odal prosti (deanery) in the Diocese of Hamar.

Churches in Eidskog
Parish (sokn)	Church name	Location of the church	Year built
Eidskog	Eidskog Church	Matrand	1665
Eidskog	Magnor Church	Magnor	1923
Vestmarka	Vestmarka Church	Vestmarka	1883

== Geography ==
The municipality is located in the southeastern part of Innlandet county. It is bordered to the east and north by Kongsvinger Municipality, to the northwest by Sør-Odal Municipality, to the west by Nes Municipality and Aurskog-Høland Municipality (both in Akershus county), and to the south by Eda Municipality in Sweden.

The lakes Digeren, Mangen, and Skjervangen are all located in Eidskog Municipality. The highest point in the municipality is the 435-metre (1,427 ft) tall mountain Hornkjølberget, just south of the border with Kongsvinger Municipality.

== History ==
Number of minorities (1st and 2nd generation) in Eidskog by country of origin in 2017
Ancestry	Number
Sweden	138
Lithuania	33
Thailand	29
Syria	26
Poland	24
Germany	23
Denmark	21

The name Eidskog is ancient and was used for the southern part of Vinger, the region between today's Kongsvinger in Norway and Arvika in Sweden. The Vinger Royal Road (Norwegian: Eskoleia) historically traveled through Eidskog (and continues today as the Norwegian National Road 2). It was one of the most important traffic arteries between Norway and Sweden. The name Eidskog was already in use during the saga period and became, after the canonization of Saint Olaf and important pilgrim's route from Europe to Nidaros Cathedral. During the 12th century, the Eidskog Church was built. It was a stave church built in Midtskog (which means Norwegian: middle of the woods). The present Eidskog Church is built on the same site (now called Matrand) and this building was constructed in 1665.

The way through Eidskog was also militarily important and many times through history has been the point of Swedish strikes into Hedmark. To defend against these assaults, a number of fortifications were built in the vicinity, including ones at Magnor and Matrand, but the chief fortification was Kongsvinger Fortress (to the north).

The last Swedish attack through Eidskog was in 1814 when Major General Carl Pontus Gahn on July 31 crossed the border and marched against Kongsvinger. His forces were stopped at Lier outside Kongsvinger on 2 August 1814 by troops led by Lieutenant Colonel Andreas Samuel Krebs (1769–1818) and retreated to Eidskog. On 4 August 1814, Krebs followed after to drive Swedish troops off Norwegian territory. The two forces met in the Battle of Matrand which was the bloodiest battle of the war and ended with a Norwegian victory.

Later in 1814, Norway was joined in union with Sweden and the confrontations at the Eidskog border ended.

The Soot Canal, constructed in 1849, has Norway's oldest sluice gates. It was the work of Engebret Soot (1786–1859). It was built to allow timber to be transported (floated) to the Halden sawmills. The canal was 1.5 kilometres (0.9 mi) long and had 16 locks which extended from Lake Skjervangen at 185 metres (607 ft) above sea level up to Lake Mortsjølungen at 201 metres (659 ft) above sea level.

The route through Eidskog became an important connection between the two countries; this was strengthened with the opening of the Grenseban railway in 1862, which connected Christiania to Stockholm.

== Government ==
Eidskog Municipality is responsible for primary education (through 10th grade), outpatient health services, senior citizen services, welfare and other social services, zoning, economic development, and municipal roads and utilities. The municipality is governed by a municipal council of directly elected representatives. The mayor is indirectly elected by a vote of the municipal council. The municipality is under the jurisdiction of the Romerike og Glåmdal District Court and the Eidsivating Court of Appeal.

=== Municipal council ===
The municipal council (Kommunestyre) of Eidskog Municipality is made up of 25 representatives that are elected to four year terms. The tables below show the current and historical composition of the council by political party.

Eidskog kommunestyre 2023–2027
Party name (in Norwegian)	Number of representatives
Labour Party (Arbeiderpartiet)	12
Progress Party (Fremskrittspartiet)	3
Conservative Party (Høyre)	4
Pensioners' Party (Pensjonistpartiet)	1
Centre Party (Senterpartiet)	5
Total number of members:	25

Eidskog kommunestyre 2019–2023
Party name (in Norwegian)	Number of representatives
Labour Party (Arbeiderpartiet)	9
Progress Party (Fremskrittspartiet)	2
Conservative Party (Høyre)	3
Centre Party (Senterpartiet)	9
Socialist Left Party (Sosialistisk Venstreparti)	1
Liberal Party (Venstre)	1
Total number of members:	25

Eidskog kommunestyre 2015–2019
Party name (in Norwegian)	Number of representatives
Labour Party (Arbeiderpartiet)	12
Progress Party (Fremskrittspartiet)	2
Conservative Party (Høyre)	3
Centre Party (Senterpartiet)	7
Liberal Party (Venstre)	1
Total number of members:	25

Eidskog kommunestyre 2011–2015
Party name (in Norwegian)	Number of representatives
Labour Party (Arbeiderpartiet)	10
Progress Party (Fremskrittspartiet)	3
Conservative Party (Høyre)	5
Centre Party (Senterpartiet)	9
Socialist Left Party (Sosialistisk Venstreparti)	1
Liberal Party (Venstre)	1
Total number of members:	29

Eidskog kommunestyre 2007–2011
Party name (in Norwegian)	Number of representatives
Labour Party (Arbeiderpartiet)	12
Progress Party (Fremskrittspartiet)	6
Conservative Party (Høyre)	5
Centre Party (Senterpartiet)	4
Socialist Left Party (Sosialistisk Venstreparti)	2
Total number of members:	29

Eidskog kommunestyre 2003–2007
Party name (in Norwegian)	Number of representatives
Labour Party (Arbeiderpartiet)	20
Progress Party (Fremskrittspartiet)	2
Conservative Party (Høyre)	3
Centre Party (Senterpartiet)	2
Socialist Left Party (Sosialistisk Venstreparti)	2
Total number of members:	29

Eidskog kommunestyre 1999–2003
Party name (in Norwegian)	Number of representatives
Labour Party (Arbeiderpartiet)	16
Progress Party (Fremskrittspartiet)	3
Conservative Party (Høyre)	4
Centre Party (Senterpartiet)	4
Socialist Left Party (Sosialistisk Venstreparti)	2
Total number of members:	29

Eidskog kommunestyre 1995–1999
Party name (in Norwegian)	Number of representatives
Labour Party (Arbeiderpartiet)	16
Conservative Party (Høyre)	4
Centre Party (Senterpartiet)	7
Socialist Left Party (Sosialistisk Venstreparti)	2
Total number of members:	29

Eidskog kommunestyre 1991–1995
Party name (in Norwegian)	Number of representatives
Labour Party (Arbeiderpartiet)	17
Conservative Party (Høyre)	3
Centre Party (Senterpartiet)	5
Socialist Left Party (Sosialistisk Venstreparti)	4
Total number of members:	29

Eidskog kommunestyre 1987–1991
Party name (in Norwegian)	Number of representatives
Labour Party (Arbeiderpartiet)	20
Conservative Party (Høyre)	4
Christian Democratic Party (Kristelig Folkeparti)	1
Centre Party (Senterpartiet)	2
Socialist Left Party (Sosialistisk Venstreparti)	1
Liberal Party (Venstre)	1
Total number of members:	29

Eidskog kommunestyre 1983–1987
Party name (in Norwegian)	Number of representatives
Labour Party (Arbeiderpartiet)	21
Conservative Party (Høyre)	3
Christian Democratic Party (Kristelig Folkeparti)	1
Centre Party (Senterpartiet)	2
Socialist Left Party (Sosialistisk Venstreparti)	1
Liberal Party (Venstre)	1
Total number of members:	29

Eidskog kommunestyre 1979–1983
Party name (in Norwegian)	Number of representatives
Labour Party (Arbeiderpartiet)	19
Conservative Party (Høyre)	3
Christian Democratic Party (Kristelig Folkeparti)	2
Centre Party (Senterpartiet)	4
Socialist Left Party (Sosialistisk Venstreparti)	1
Total number of members:	29

Eidskog kommunestyre 1975–1979
Party name (in Norwegian)	Number of representatives
Labour Party (Arbeiderpartiet)	18
Conservative Party (Høyre)	2
Christian Democratic Party (Kristelig Folkeparti)	2
Centre Party (Senterpartiet)	5
Socialist Left Party (Sosialistisk Venstreparti)	2
Total number of members:	29

Eidskog kommunestyre 1971–1975
Party name (in Norwegian)	Number of representatives
Labour Party (Arbeiderpartiet)	20
Conservative Party (Høyre)	2
Centre Party (Senterpartiet)	5
Socialist People's Party (Sosialistisk Folkeparti)	1
Liberal Party (Venstre)	1
Total number of members:	29

Eidskog kommunestyre 1967–1971
Party name (in Norwegian)	Number of representatives
Labour Party (Arbeiderpartiet)	22
Conservative Party (Høyre)	1
Centre Party (Senterpartiet)	4
Socialist People's Party (Sosialistisk Folkeparti)	1
Liberal Party (Venstre)	1
Total number of members:	29

Eidskog kommunestyre 1963–1967
Party name (in Norwegian)	Number of representatives
Labour Party (Arbeiderpartiet)	21
Conservative Party (Høyre)	1
Communist Party (Kommunistiske Parti)	1
Centre Party (Senterpartiet)	3
Socialist People's Party (Sosialistisk Folkeparti)	1
Liberal Party (Venstre)	2
Total number of members:	29

Eidskog herredsstyre 1959–1963
Party name (in Norwegian)	Number of representatives
Labour Party (Arbeiderpartiet)	19
Conservative Party (Høyre)	2
Communist Party (Kommunistiske Parti)	2
Centre Party (Senterpartiet)	4
Liberal Party (Venstre)	2
Total number of members:	29

Eidskog herredsstyre 1955–1959
Party name (in Norwegian)	Number of representatives
Labour Party (Arbeiderpartiet)	19
Communist Party (Kommunistiske Parti)	3
Farmers' Party (Bondepartiet)	4
Joint List(s) of Non-Socialist Parties (Borgerlige Felleslister)	3
Total number of members:	29

Eidskog herredsstyre 1951–1955
Party name (in Norwegian)	Number of representatives
Labour Party (Arbeiderpartiet)	17
Communist Party (Kommunistiske Parti)	4
Farmers' Party (Bondepartiet)	3
Joint List(s) of Non-Socialist Parties (Borgerlige Felleslister)	4
Total number of members:	28

Eidskog herredsstyre 1947–1951
Party name (in Norwegian)	Number of representatives
Labour Party (Arbeiderpartiet)	16
Communist Party (Kommunistiske Parti)	6
Farmers' Party (Bondepartiet)	2
Joint List(s) of Non-Socialist Parties (Borgerlige Felleslister)	4
Total number of members:	28

Eidskog herredsstyre 1945–1947
Party name (in Norwegian)	Number of representatives
Labour Party (Arbeiderpartiet)	15
Communist Party (Kommunistiske Parti)	7
Christian Democratic Party (Kristelig Folkeparti)	2
Joint List(s) of Non-Socialist Parties (Borgerlige Felleslister)	4
Total number of members:	28

Eidskog herredsstyre 1937–1941*
Party name (in Norwegian)	Number of representatives
Labour Party (Arbeiderpartiet)	19
Conservative Party (Høyre)	2
Farmers' Party (Bondepartiet)	2
Liberal Party (Venstre)	3
Joint List(s) of Non-Socialist Parties (Borgerlige Felleslister)	2
Total number of members:	28
Note: Due to the German occupation of Norway during World War II, no elections were held for new municipal councils until after the war ended in 1945.

=== Mayors ===
The mayor (Norwegian: ordfører) of Eidskog Municipality is the political leader of the municipality and the chairperson of the municipal council. Here is a list of people who have held this position:

- 1864–1872: Henry T. Fearnley
- 1872–1879: Haagen Pedersen Malmer
- 1879–1895: Meldal Johnsen
- 1895–1897: O. Løken
- 1897–1905: Hans Taugbøl
- 1905–1907: O. Løken
- 1908–1913: Otto Pramm
- 1913–1915: Ole Syversen Fagernæs (V)
- 1915–1915: M. T. Huse
- 1915–1916: Olof Nilsson
- 1917–1919: Otto Pramm
- 1920–1922: H. A. Rambøl
- 1923–1928: Thorvald Taugbøl
- 1929–1934: Kaspar Billerud
- 1935–1945: Selmer Alm (Ap)
- 1945–1947: Hallgrim Sørli (Ap)
- 1948–1963: Sigurd Skjørberg
- 1964–1981: Ivar Delviken
- 1982–1983: Kaare Fjeld
- 1984–1999: Kåre Delviken
- 1999–2005: Ivar Skulstad (Ap)
- 2005–2007: Greta Storm Ofteland (Ap)
- 2007–2015: Knut Gustav Woie (Sp)
- 2015–present: Kamilla Thue (Ap)

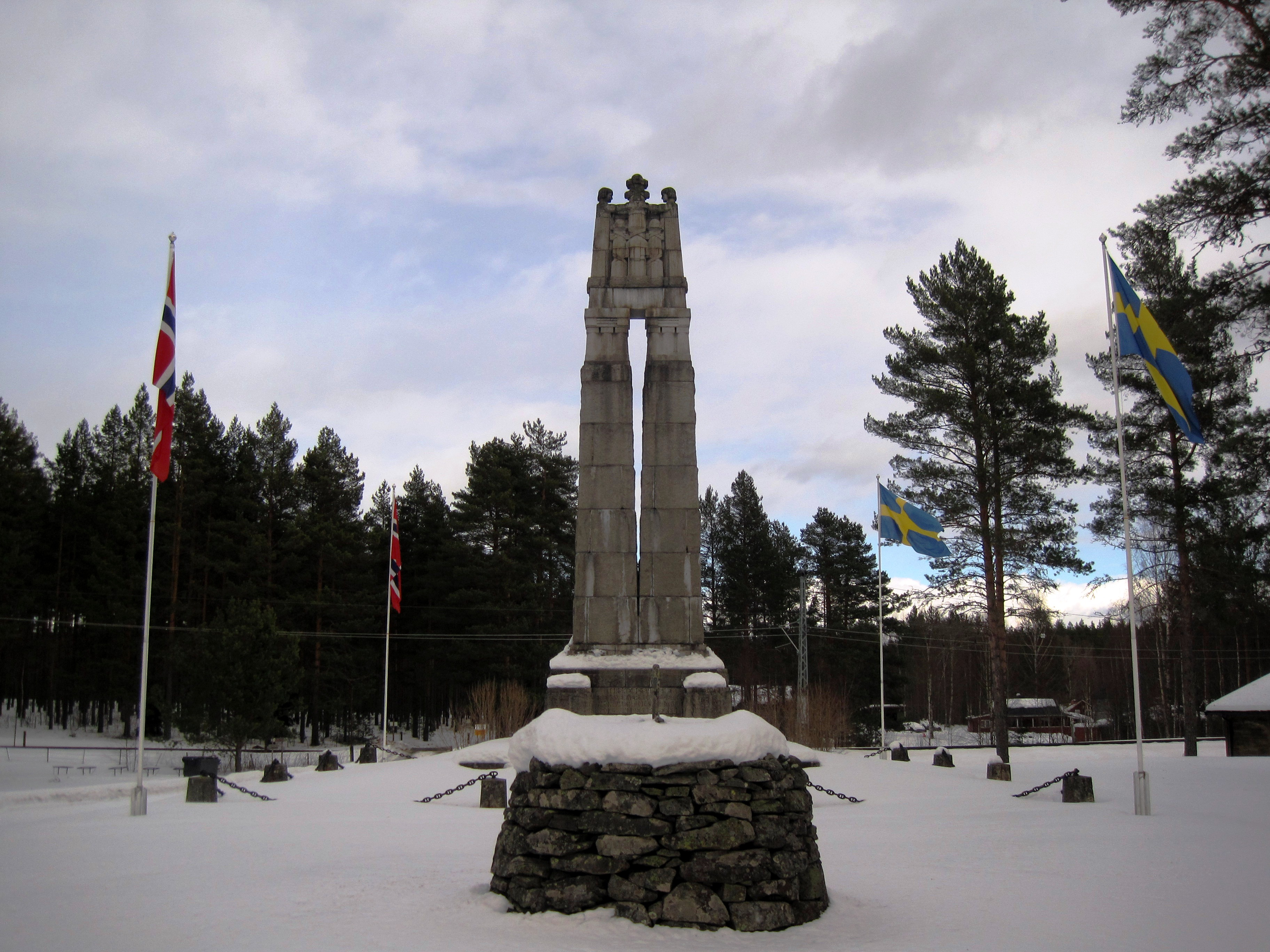
Peace Monument in Morokulien

== Attractions ==
- Soot Canal - the first lock constructed in Norway, used for log floating
- Grenselosmuseet - museum on the route for escape to Sweden during the World War II
- Oppistun Børli - poet Hans Børli's home
- Morokulien - memorial to the long lasting peace with Sweden
- Rønning Treski - last wood ski producer in Norway

== Notable people ==
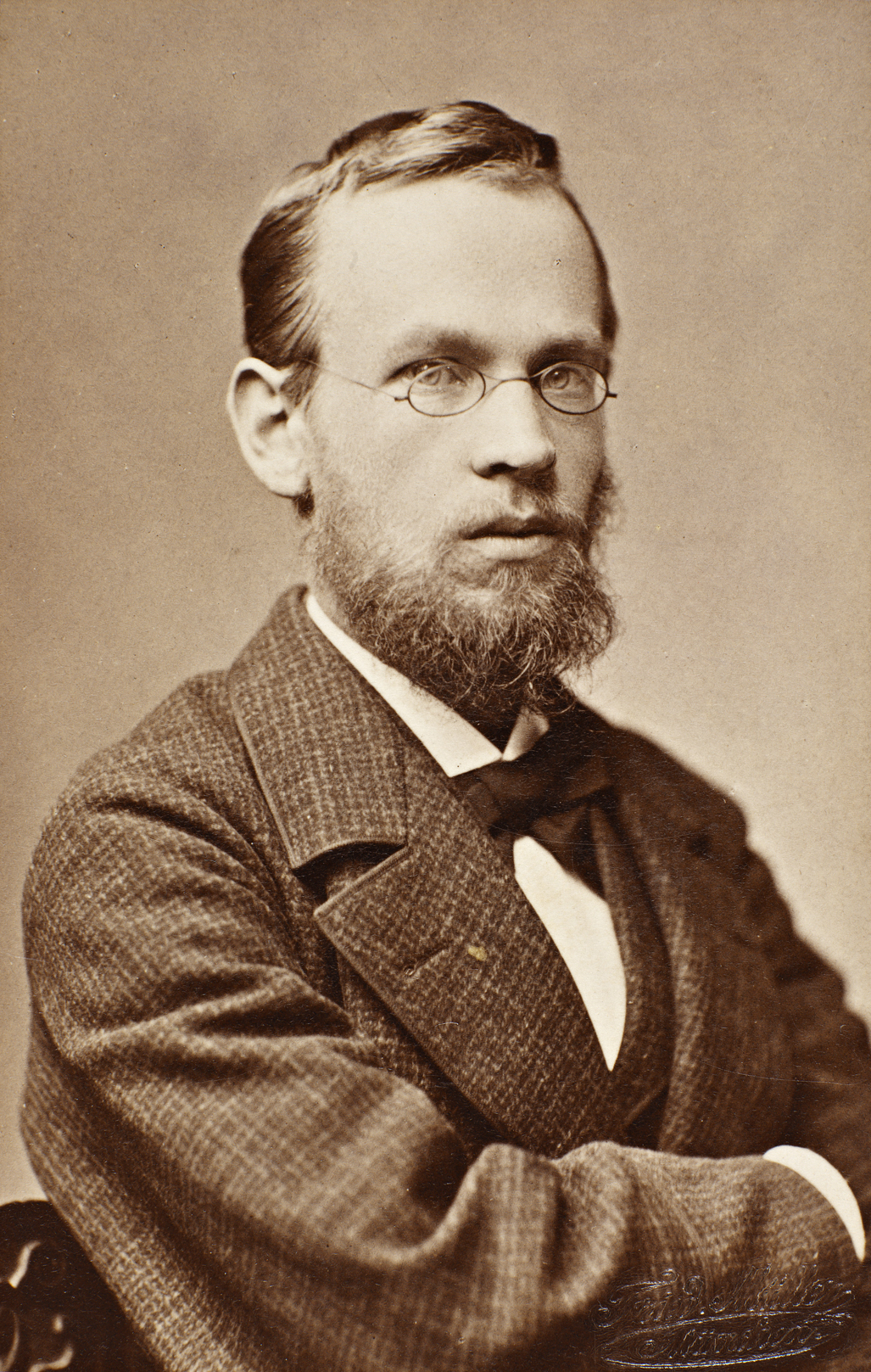
Erik Werenskiold, 1880

- Erik Werenskiold (1855 in Eidskog – 1938), a painter and illustrator
- Konrad Hirsch (1900 in Eidskog – 1924), a Swedish footballer who played in 1924 Summer Olympics
- Julla Sæthern (1901 in Eidskog – 1981), a barrister, feminist, and Norwegian politician
- Hans Børli (1918 at Eidskog – 1989), a poet, writer, and lumberjack
- Torgrim Sollid (born 1942 in Eidskog), a composer and folk and jazz musician
- Ivar Skulstad (born 1953), a Norwegian politician and Mayor of Eidskog from 1999 to 2005
- Kristin Solli Schøien (born 1954), an author and composer who lives in Eidskog
- Remi Eriksen (born 1967), the Group President and CEO of DNV GL (a classification society)
- Wilhelm Brenna (born 1979), a retired ski jumper and junior world champion
- Andreas Ulvo (born 1983), a jazz pianist, organist, keyboardist, and composer
