= Magnor Church =

Church in Innlandet, Norway

- Magnor kirke
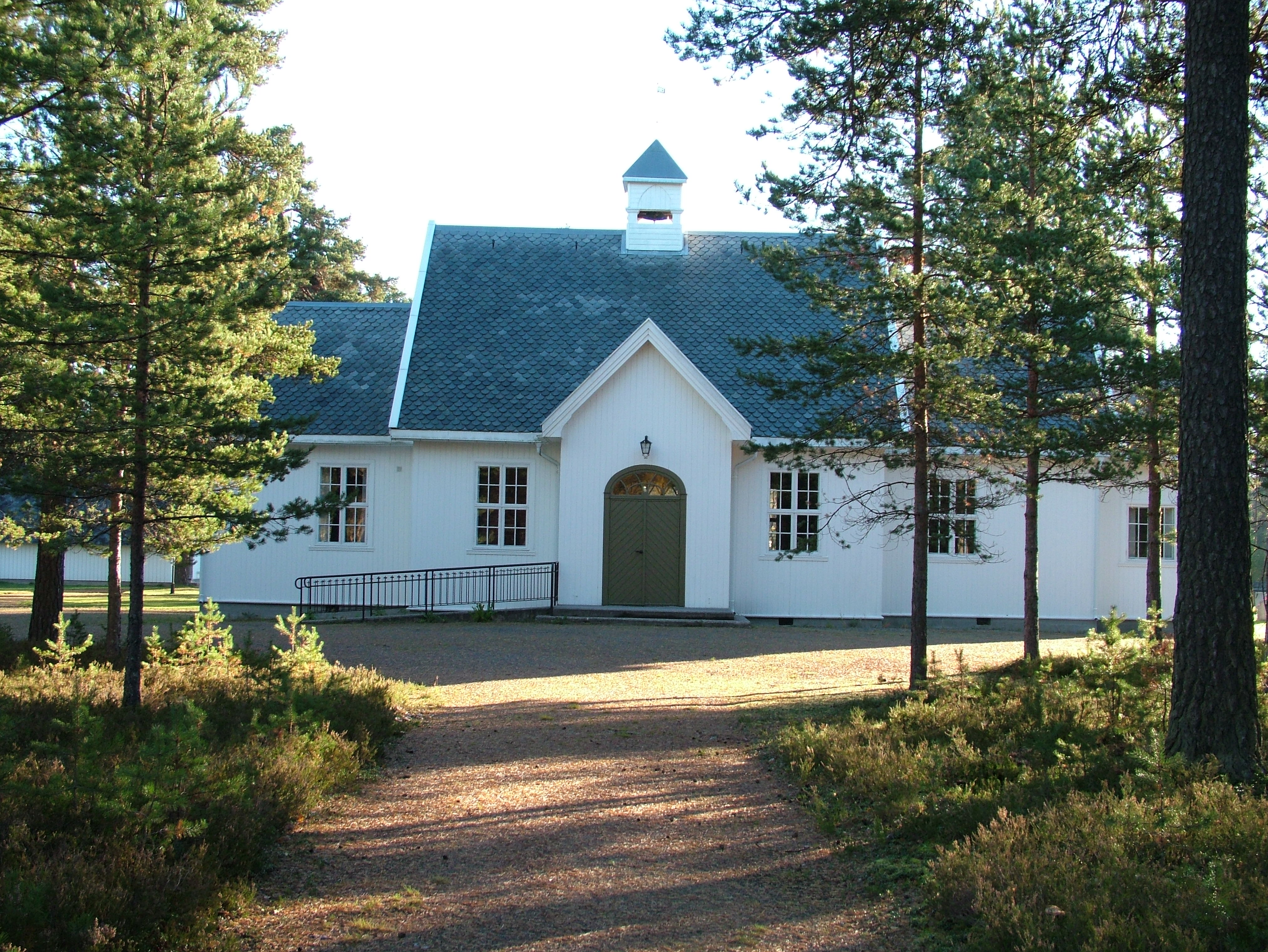
- View of the church
- Magnor Church
- 59°56′43″N 12°11′35″E
- Location: Eidskog Municipality, Innlandet
- Country: Norway
- Denomination: Church of Norway
- Churchmanship: Evangelical Lutheran

History
- Status: Chapel
- Founded: 1923
- Consecrated: 1924

Architecture
- Functional status: Active
- Architect: S. Brenne
- Architectural type: Long church
- Completed: 1923 (103 years ago)

Specifications
- Capacity: 100
- Materials: Wood

Administration
- Diocese: Hamar bispedømme
- Deanery: Solør, Vinger og Odal prosti
- Parish: Eidskog
- Norwegian Cultural Heritage Site
- Type: Church
- Status: Not protected
- ID: 84374

Magnor Church (Norwegian: Magnor kirke) is a chapel of the Church of Norway in Eidskog Municipality in Innlandet county, Norway. It is located in the village of Magnor. It is an annex chapel for the Eidskog parish which is part of the Solør, Vinger og Odal prosti (deanery) in the Diocese of Hamar. The white, wooden church was built in a long church design in 1923 using plans drawn up by the architect S. Brenne. The church seats about 100 people.

== History ==
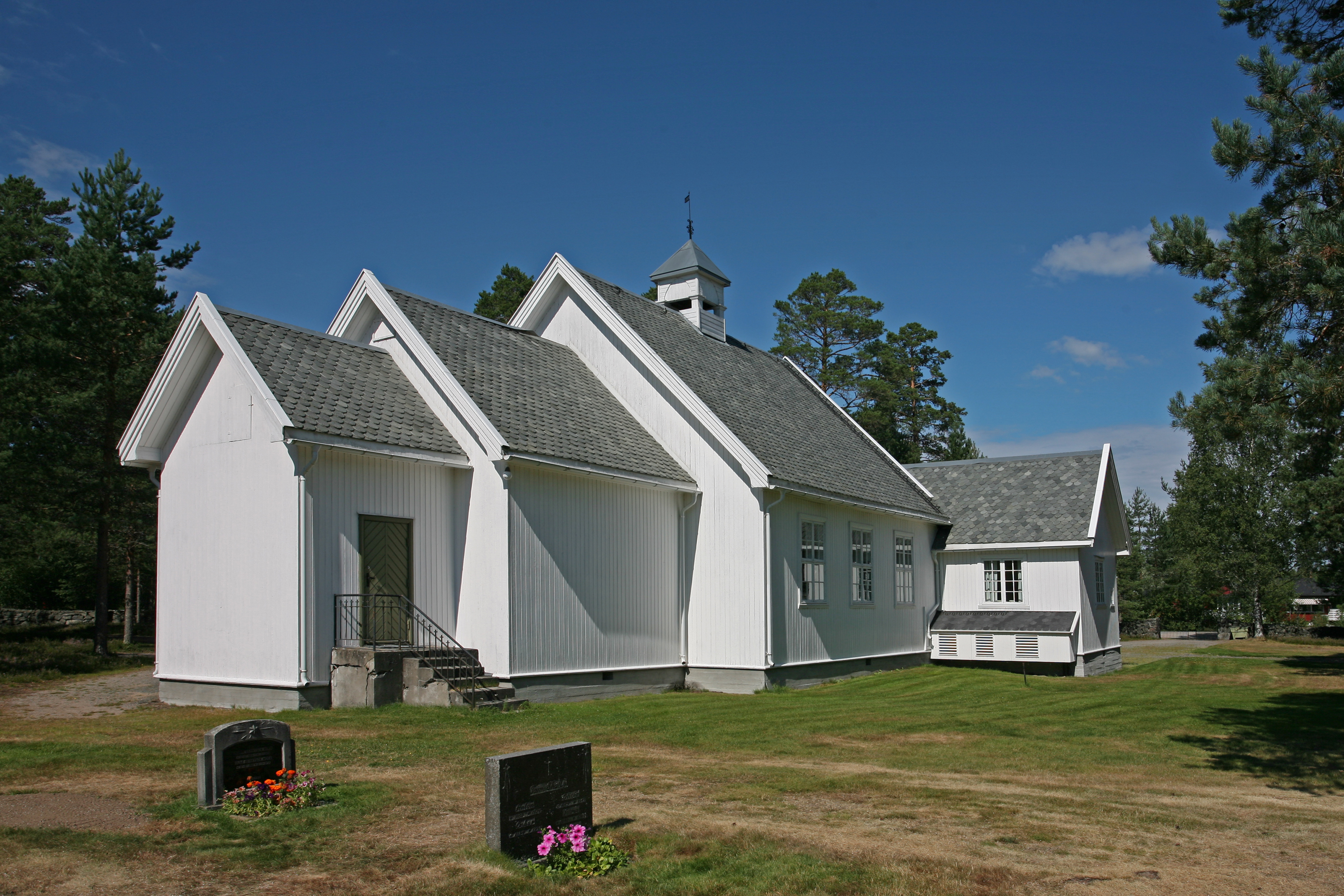
View of the church

In 1923, a prayer house chapel was built in the village of Magnor. It was consecrated for church use in 1924. The church is a typical wooden long church. The building is today titled as a church, but is technically an annex chapel that belongs to the Eidskog parish with Eidskog Church in Matrand as the main church rather than being its own parish.

== See also ==
- List of churches in Hamar
