= Willi Jutzi =

Willi Jutzi (2 September 1913 in Saarpfaltz, Bavaria – July 1941, in Värmland, Sweden) was a German soldier during World War II stationed in Gardermoen in Nazi occupied Norway.

== Desertion ==
On 26 June 1941, after being stationed in Gardermoen for about 13 months, Jutzi deserted the German Army and fled from Norway over the border along with his Norwegian girlfriend, Ragna Fevik, to neutral Sweden, where he hoped to receive asylum. However the Swedish Government returned all such deserters and political refugees to the Nazi German authorities.

The couple was informed by a local sheriff that Jutzi would have to go back to Norway, but that Ms. Fevik was allowed to stay if she wished. Fevik stated she desired to accompany him during the deportation.

Fearing that he would be executed upon arrival, a fear not at all far from reality, Jutzi tried to escape from the Swedish police when they stopped at the border to Norway in order to deport him in July 1941. What happened next is not clear. Almost a year after his escape, the decomposed remains of Jutzi's body were discovered in a river by two teenage boys just a couple of hundred meters from where he had escaped. In the late 1950s, an investigation was made by the reporter D.V. Andersson from Arvika. He thought it was unclear how Jutzi had died and his conclusion was that he had been shot by the Swedish police who had been escorting him.

During the war, at least 15 German soldiers (that had fled Norway & been deported back by the Swedish authorities) were executed.

No official explanation has ever been made, and even today the case is unsolved.

Willi Jutzi was buried at Eda cemetery in Värmland on 8 July 1942.
