= Charlottenberg =

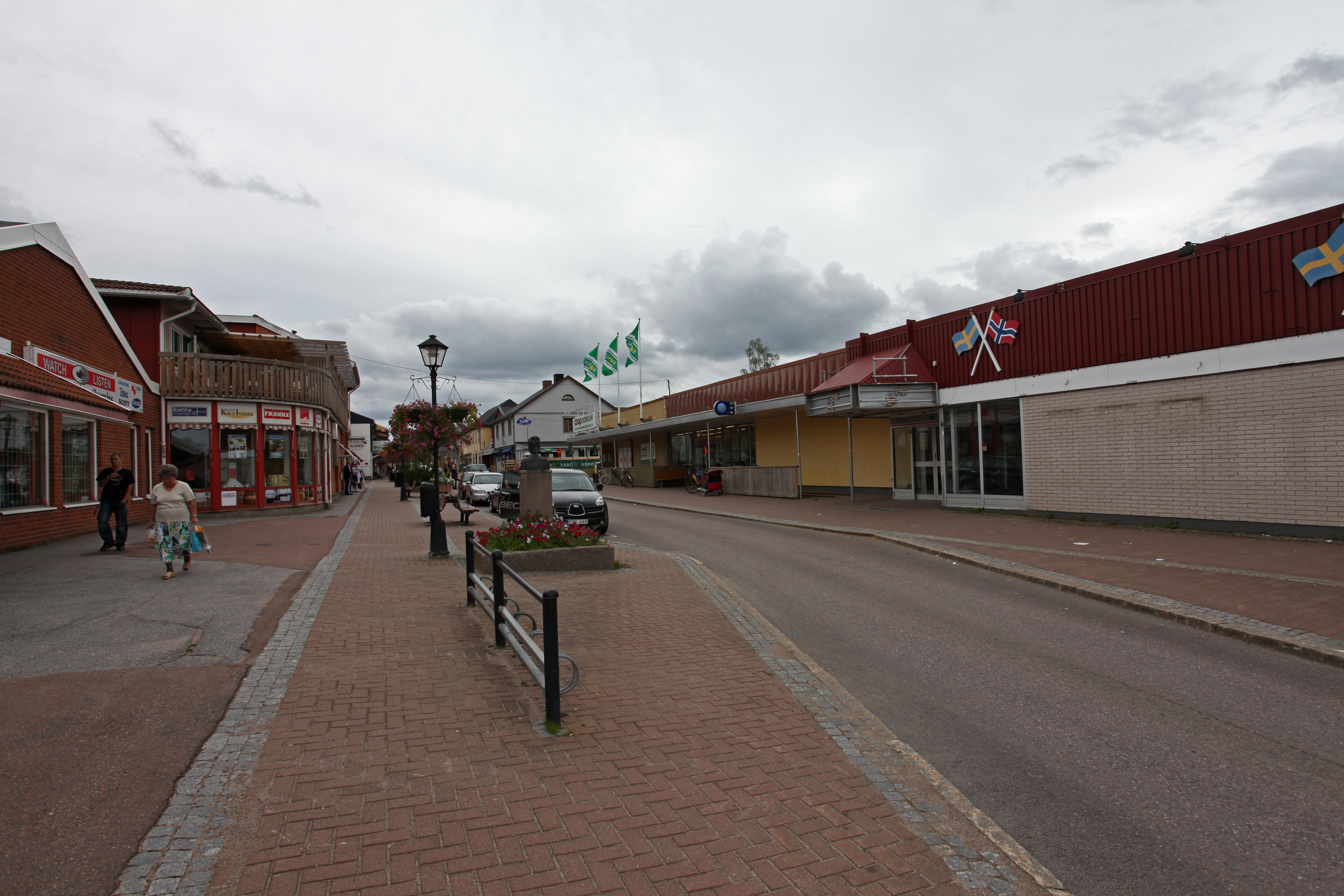
- Charlottenberg town centre

- Location within Sweden
- Coordinates: 59°53′N 12°17′E
- Country: Sweden
- Province: Värmland
- County: Värmland County
- Municipality: Eda Municipality

Area
  - Total: 2.59 km^{2} (1.00 sq mi)

Population (31 December 2010)
  - Total: 2,215
  - Density: 857/km^{2} (2,220/sq mi)
- Time zone: UTC+1 (CET)
  - Summer (DST): UTC+2 (CEST)

Charlottenberg is a locality in Värmland County, Sweden, and the administrative centre of Eda Municipality.

Situated some seven kilometres from the Norwegian border, the town has a population of around 3,000. Charlottenberg railway station is the last in Sweden before the Norwegian border, and serves as the frontier point between the Swedish and Norwegian railway systems. The town lies on Swedish national road (riksväg) 61, which becomes Norwegian national road (riksvei) 2 at the border. Nearby towns include Åmotfors (14 km) and Arvika (30 km) in Sweden, Magnor (9 km), Skotterud (14 km), and Kongsvinger (38 km) in Norway.

As a border town, Charlottenberg benefits greatly from the border trade encouraged by the difference in retail prices between Norway and Sweden. Alcohol, meat, and confectionery are sold in large quantities. The influx of Norwegian shoppers is so great in the period leading up to Christmas that many Charlottenberg locals prefer to do their own shopping in other towns at this time of year.

As well as retailing, Charlottenberg's economic activities include the manufacture of cast aluminium components for the transport industry.
