= Hans Børli =

Norwegian poet and writer

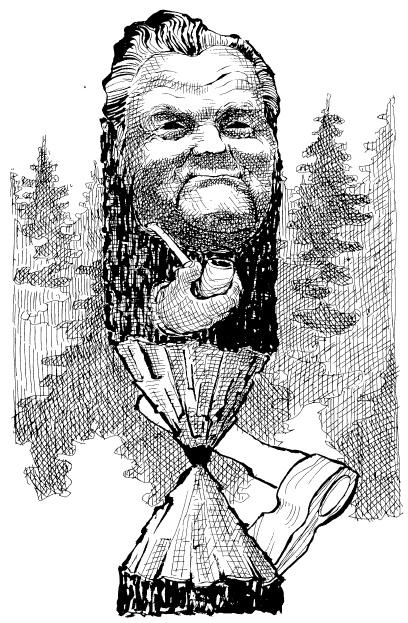
Hans Børli Illustration by Oddmund Mikkelsen . 1985

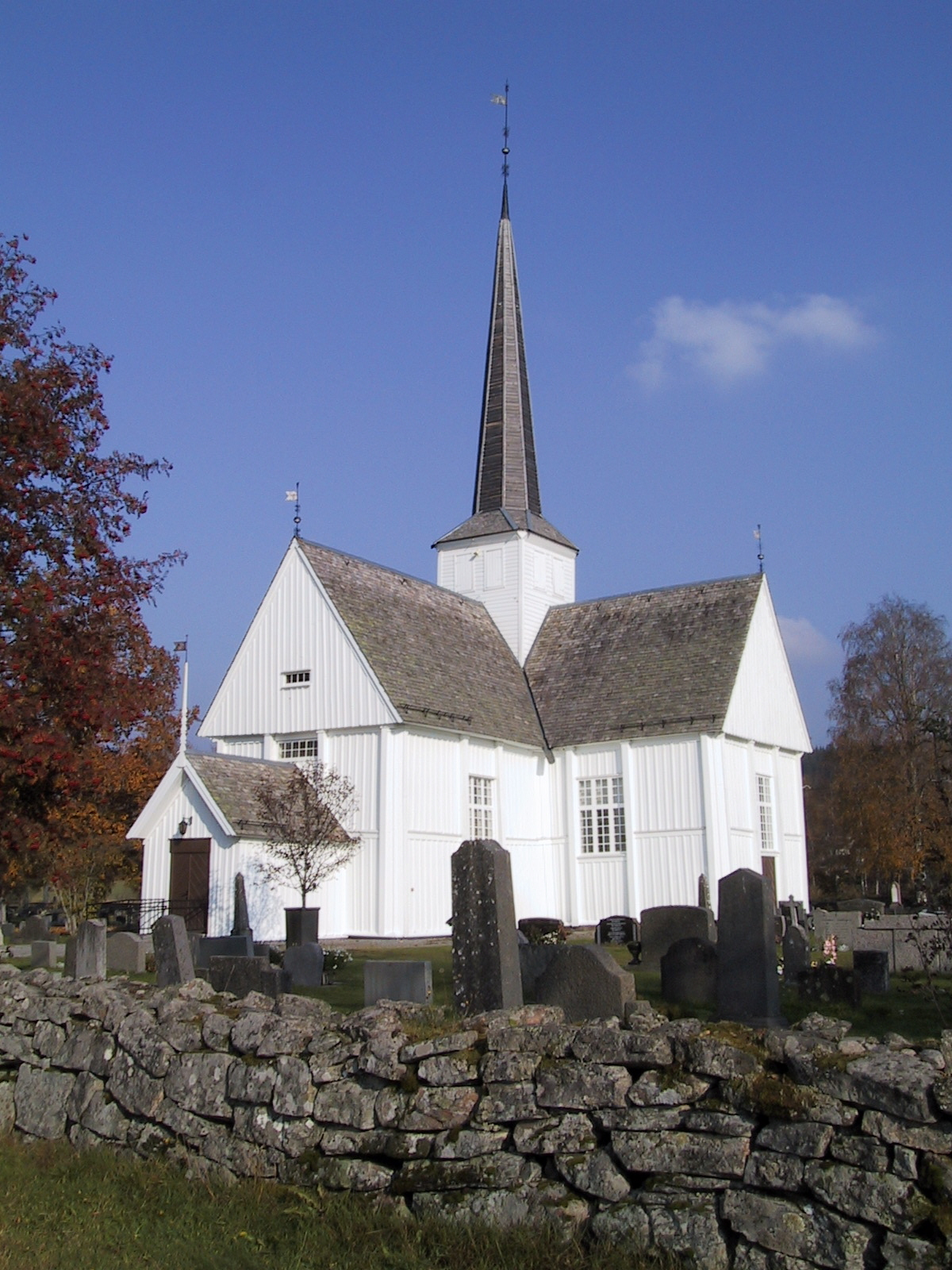
Hans Børli was buried at Eidskog Church

Hans Børli (8 December 1918 – 26 August 1989) was a Norwegian poet and writer, who besides his writings worked as a lumberjack all his life.

== Biography ==
Hans Georg Nilsen Børli was born in Eidskog Municipality in Hedmark county, Norway. He was the fifth of seven children born to Nils Thorkildsen Børli (1883–1951) and Marie Bolette Olsdatter Børli (1881–1962). Børli was raised on a small farm in a road-less area in the forests of Eidskog Municipality. The experience of poverty and hardship would leave a deep imprint on his later art. However, the positive effects of living close to nature, the wisdom of tradition and the solidarity between workers also had a significant bearing on his writings. A strict Christian pietist upbringing would leave Børli forever struggling with the counteractive forces of rebellion and a deeply embedded sense of religious longing.

Børli was considered a gifted boy and was admitted to Talhaug Mercantile School in Kongsvinger. He later was admitted to a military academy in Oslo, but his education was ended by the outbreak of the Second World War. Børli fought against the invading German Army, was involved in some intense battles in Vardal Municipality, and was captured in Verdal Municipality. After being released, he went back to Eidskog and worked as a teacher and forest worker for the remaining of the war. During the Occupation of Norway by Nazi Germany, he was also involved in illegal activities including guiding refugees across the Swedish border.

His first collection of poetry, Tyrield was published in 1945. Until the mid-1950s, he published books almost annually, both poetry and prose. His writings were a characteristic blend of traditional and free form, romance and realism, perversion, seriousness, social awareness and religious quest. Ole Gundersen Børli (1860–1945), his mother's father was considered one of the last great oral narrator of legends and stories of the area. He was considered an important influence on the young writer-to-be. Hans Børli was by his own account also heavily influenced by the writings of poet Olav H. Hauge (1908–1994).

Hans Børli died in 1989 at 70 years of age and was buried at Eidskog Church.

== Publications ==
=== Poetry ===
Years link to corresponding "[year] in poetry" articles:

- 1945: Tyrielden ("Pine Passion")
- 1948: Villfugl ("Wild Bird")
- 1949: Men støtt kom nye vårer ("But Spring Would Always Come")
- 1952: Likevel må du leve ("Still There is Life")
- 1954: Ser jeg en blomme i skogen ("When I See a Flower in the Forest")
- 1957: Kont-Jo ("Timber Joe")
- 21/10-1958:Dagene ("Days")
- 1960: Jeg ville fange en fugl ("I Wanted to Catch a Bird")
- 1962: Ved bålet ("By Campfire")
- 1964: Hver liten ting ("Every Little Thing")
- 1966: Brønnen utenfor Nachors stad ("The Well by Nachor")
- 1968: Når menneskene er gått heim ("When Humans Have Gone Home")
- 1978: Dag og drøm ("Day and Dream")
- 1969: Som rop ved elver ("Like Roars by Rivers")
- 1970: Isfuglen ("The Ice Bird")
- 1972: Kyndelsmesse ("Candlemas")
- 1974: Vindharpe ("Wind Harp")
- 1976: Vinden ser aldri på veiviserne ("The Wind Never Beholds the Pathfinder")
- 1979: Når kvelden står rød over Hesteknatten ("Evening Red over the Horse Hummock")
- 1984: Frosne tranebær ("Frozen Cranberries")

=== Prose ===
Years link to corresponding "[year] in literature" articles:

- 1946: Han som valte skogen ("He Who Chose the Forest"), novel
- 1949: Det small et skott ("A Shot was Heard"), novel
- 1951: Sølv og stål ("Silver and Steel")
- 1953: Under lomskriket ("The Cry of the Loon"),
- 1987: Tusseleiken (fortellinger og skisser)
- 1988: Med øks og lyre. Blar av en tømmerhuggers dagbok ("With Axe and Lyre. Pages from the Diary of a Lumberjack"), autobiography
- 1991: Smykket fra slagmarken ("Gem from a Battlefield"), novel

=== Other ===
About Hans Børli:

- 1998: Syng liv i ditt liv. En biografi. ("Sing Life in Your Life.- A Biography.")

In translation:

- We Own the Forests: And Other Poems, sixty of Børli's poems in a parallel Norwegian-English edition, translated by Louis Muinzer
- Cesta lesy, 43 of Børli's poems in a parallel Norwegian-Czech edition, translated by Petr Uhlíř
- 1980: Fågel, hjärta och yxa : dikter, a selection of poems in a Swedish edition, translated by Christer Eriksson
- 1981: Ord över gränserna, a selection of poems in a Swedish edition, translated by Christer Eriksson

== Prizes and recognition ==
- 1970 : Norwegian Critics Prize for Literature
- 1971 : Nominated for the Nordic Council's Literature Prize for the poetry collection Isfuglen
- 1972 : Dobloug Prize
- 1974 : Mads Wiel Nygaard's Endowment
- 1982 : Fritt Ord Honorary Award.
