= Halden Canal =

Canal in Østfold county, Norway

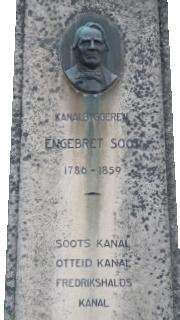
A monument at Ørje lock recognizes Engebret Soot (1786–1859)

The Halden Canal near Halden, Norway, began construction in 1852. The canal allows boats to travel parallel to the Swedish border of 75 km from Tistedal to Skulerud. Engebret Soot (1786 - 1859) was responsible for this canal, as well as the earlier Soot Canal. Tistedal is located 4 km from the sea at Halden. Boats can be transported by road here and from Ørje to Dalsland Canal. Halden Canal was added to the list of priority technical and industrial cultural heritage by the Norwegian Directorate for Cultural Heritage.

== Locks ==
Four sets of locks (sluser) control the water in the canal. Between 1857 and 1860 the Strømsfoss and Ørje locks were built. In 1865, the Stenselv river portion of the canal, with two locks at Krappeto, was completed. The locks in the Halden Canal can pass vessels which are 24 m in length, 6 m in beam and of 1.6 m draft.

Ørje sluser is located at the north of the system, near Ørje. These facilities include a canal lock museum and three canal lock chambers with a total elevation difference of 10 meters. The canal lock gates are operated manually. Ørje was built in 1860. At Ørje, a standing stone has been erected for the canal constructor Engebret Soot.

Strømsfoss sluse is located near Strømsfoss (in the middle of this system) and has one canal lock gate and 2 meter elevation height. The locks were built in 1860.

Brekke sluse (in the south of the system) is Northern Europe's highest canal lock system. Brekke has four canal lock chambers and a height difference of 26.6 meters. The Brekke locks were completed in 1924.

As a start of the connection between the fjord and the pre-existing canal, three locks with totally nine metres elevation difference were built in Halden in 1909. They are not operative but the lowest at Porsnes 59.1242968°N 11.3983822°E is intact. The remaining height difference of 70 metres to Lake Femsjøen at which the present canal begins, would be a costly and demanding project and was planned but has not been attempted. Leisure boats are transported by lorry here.
