= Soot Canal =

Canal system in Norway

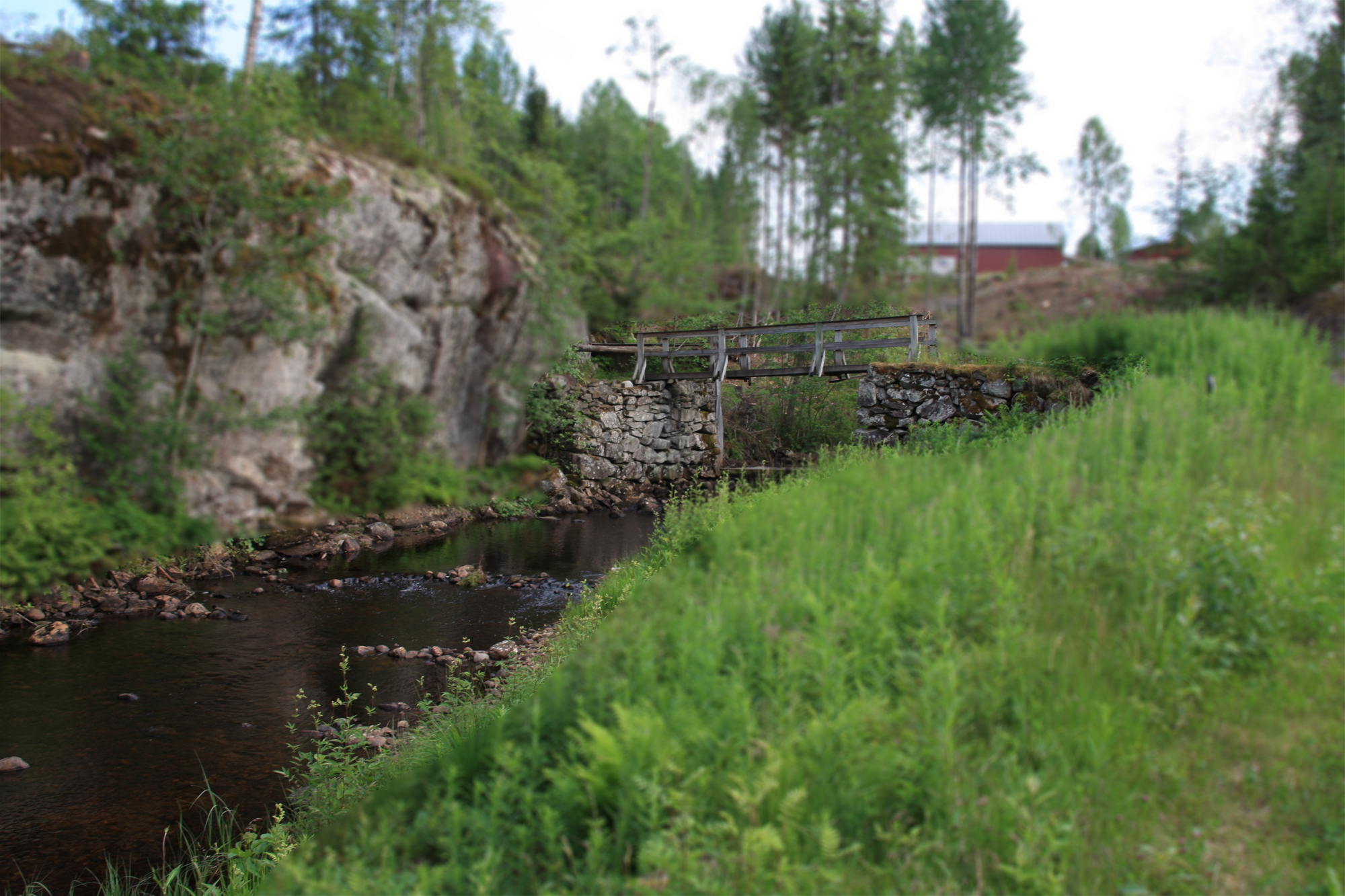
- Soot Fredrikshald

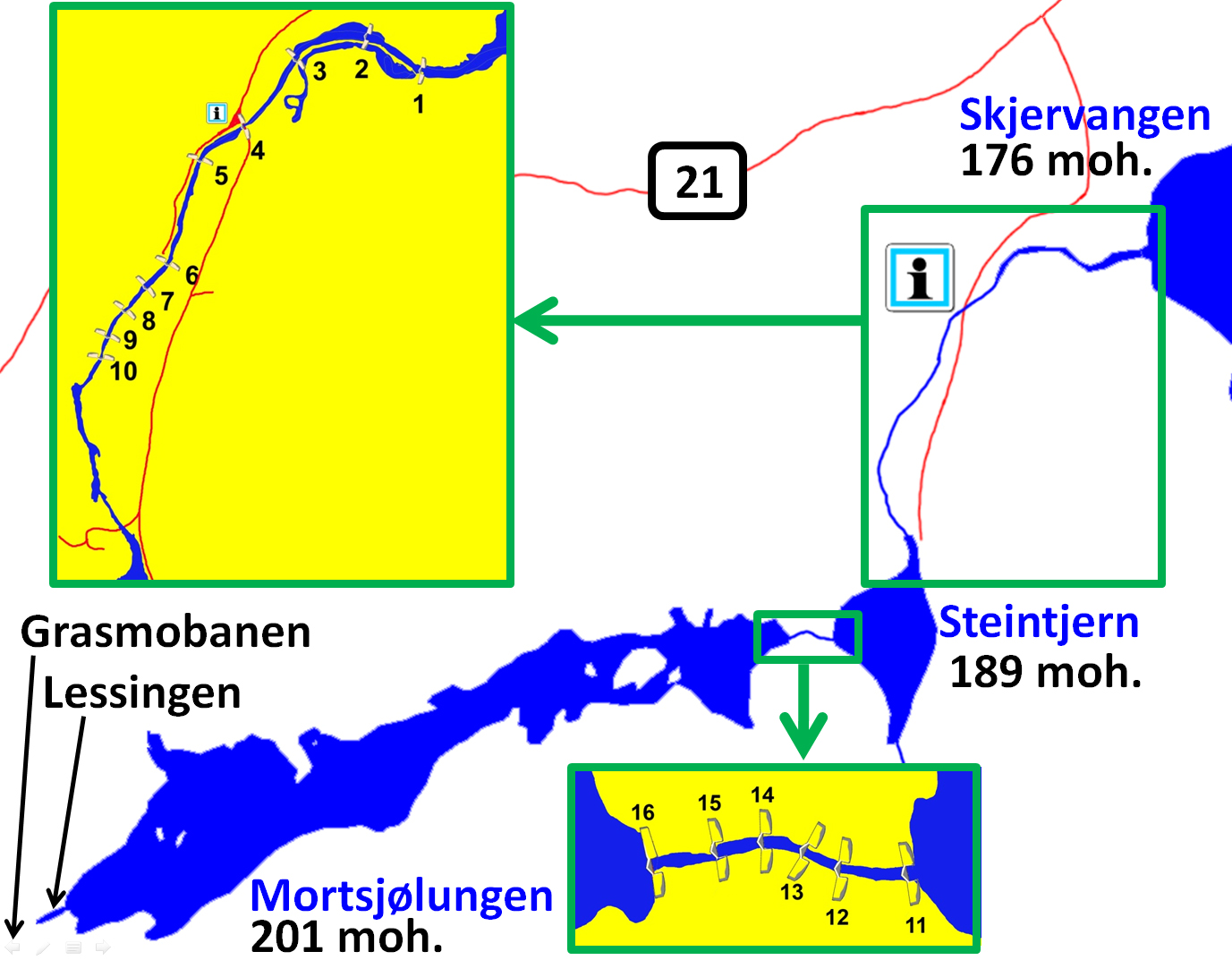
- Map of the canal system
- Location: Eidskog Municipality
- Country: Norway
- Coordinates: 59°53′26.88″N 11°51′29.51″E

Specifications
- Locks: 16
- Maximum height AMSL: 201 metres (659 ft)
- Minimum height AMSL: 185 metres (607 ft)
- Total rise: 16 metres (52 ft)
- Status: Closed

History
- Date completed: 1849
- Date closed: 1932

Geography
- Start point: Lake Skjervangen
- End point: Lake Mortsjølungen
- Beginning coordinates: 59.894329°N 11.86873197°E
- Ending coordinates: 59.88461520°N 11.8526346°E

The Soot Canal (Norwegian: Sootkanalen) was a canal system located in Eidskog Municipality in Innlandet county, Norway. Constructed in 1849, it has Norway's oldest sluice gates. It was the work of Engebret Soot (1786-1859). It was built to allow timber to be transported (floated) to the Halden sawmills. The canal was 1.5 kilometres (0.93 mi) long and had 16 locks which extended from Lake Skjervangen at an elevation of 185 metres (607 ft) above sea level up to Lake Mortsjølungen at 201 metres (659 ft) above sea level.

The Soot Canal was in operation from 1849 to 1932. The channel consisted of the original 16 locks between Skjervangen and Mortskjølungen. The Grasmobanen, a 1,460-metre (4,790 ft) long railroad that hauled the timber between the lakes Mortsjølungen and Tvillingtjern, was also part of the canal system. In 1987, Eidskog Municipality acquired rights to the counter-current sluice system and labeled it a landmark attraction.

== Other sources ==
- "Great pictures of the sluice gates" (in Norwegian). Blogspot.
- "Sootkanalen" (in Norwegian). Info from Eidskogmuseum.
- "Sootkanalen" (in Norwegian). Info from Akershusmuseet.
