= Engebret Soot =

Norwegian engineer (1786–1859)

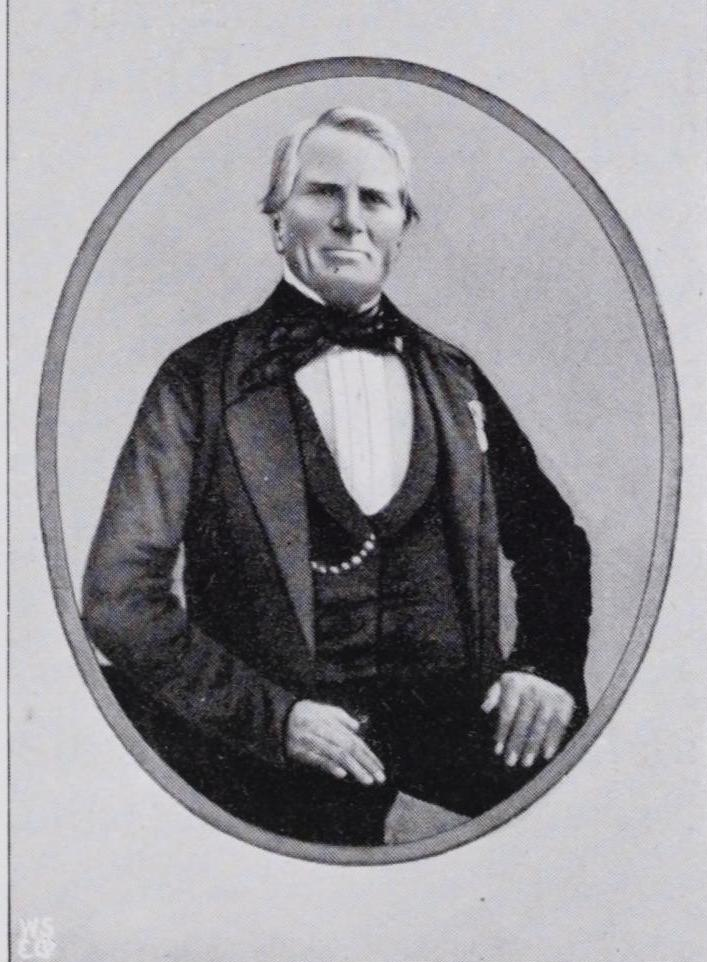
Engebret Soot

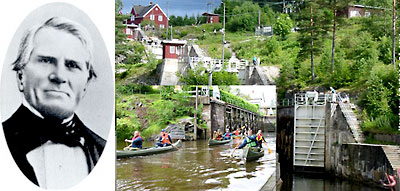
Engebret Soot and two locks from the Halden canal

Engebret Olsen Soot (26 May 1786 – 3 March 1859) was a Norwegian engineer. He was one of Norway's first canal builders and joined the timber channels at Otteid and Mangen-Grasmo. He is known as the father of the Fredrikshald Canal (now known as the Halden Canal) in south-eastern Norway. He constructed locks and canals for the transport of both watercraft and timber.

== Biography ==
Engebret Olsen Soot was born in Aurskog (now Aurskog-Høland) in Akershus, Norway. He started his career as a blacksmith and carpenter. In 1804, he built a mill on the Sotbekken, a small river at Lierfoss in Aurskog-Høland. From 1816 until 1825, he was a caretaker at the Mangenskogen forest in Aurskog-Høland. From 1827 to 1846 he was an inspector on the Halden watercourse (Haldensvassdraget) in Østfold and Akershus.

In 1824 he built works from Fredrikshald to enable log transport from Stora Le in Dalsland, Sweden, into the Fredrikshald watershed. Soot built Otteidkanalen, Norway's first canal in Østre Otteid between the years 1825 and 1827. The new log floating channel of 775 meters enabled the transport of logs to Halden.

In 1849 he opened Soot Canal, Norway's first canal with locks. It was built to allow timber to be transported (floated) to the Halden sawmills. The canal was 1.5 km long and had 16 locks which extended from Lake Skjervangen at 185 m above sea level up to Lake Mortsjølungen at 201 m above sea level. This was followed by the Halden Canal for boats. In 1858, 414 ships with a total of 950 passengers passed through the locks. He died in 1859 at Strømsfoss in Øymark (now Marker) in Østfold.
