= Åbogen =

Village in Eidskog Municipality, Norway

- Village
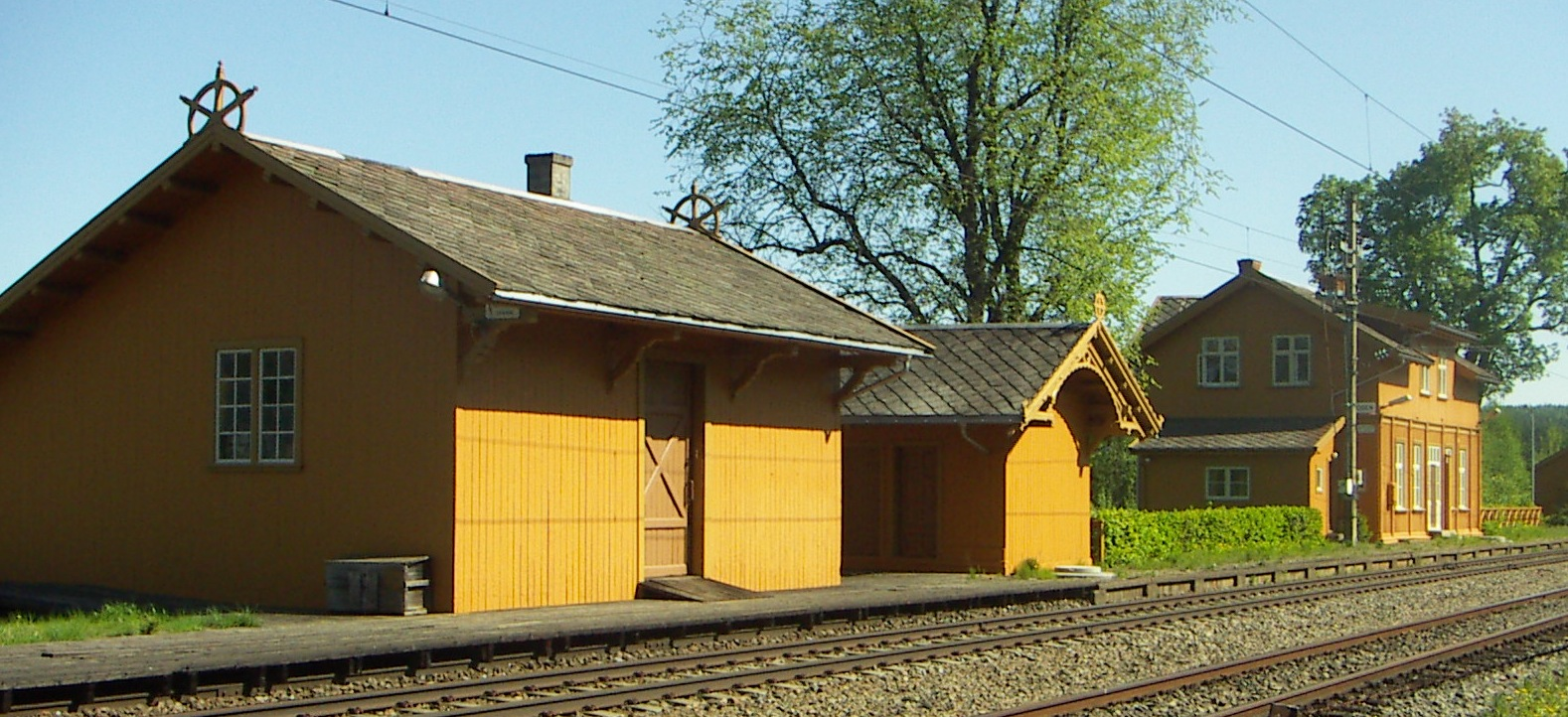
- View of the village railway station
- Interactive map of Åbogen
- Location within Innlandet Location within Norway
- Coordinates: 60.11145°N 12.11607°E
- Country: Norway
- Region: Eastern Norway
- County: Innlandet
- District: Vinger
- Municipality: Eidskog Municipality
- Elevation: 143 m (469 ft)
- Time zone: UTC+01:00 (CET)
  - Summer (DST): UTC+02:00 (CEST)
- Post Code: 2220 Åbogen

Åbogen is a village in Eidskog Municipality in Innlandet county, Norway. The village is located just south of the border with Kongsvinger Municipality and approximately 25 kilometres (16 mi) from the border with Sweden. The village of Matrand lies about 10 kilometres (6.2 mi) to the south of Åbogen.

The Åbogen Station is a stop along the Kongsvingerbanen railway line which runs between the Lillestrøm Station in Norway and onwards to the Charlottenberg Station in Sweden. The station and related buildings were designed by architect Georg Andreas Bull. All the buildings date from its opening in 1865 and are of historical value.
