= Digeren =

Lake in Innlandet, Norway

- Interactive map of the lake
- Location: Kongsvinger and Eidskog, Innlandet
- Coordinates: 60°9′42″N 12°9′24″E
- Basin countries: Norway
- Max. length: 4 kilometres (2.5 mi)
- Max. width: 1.5 kilometres (0.93 mi)
- Surface area: 2.55 km^{2} (0.98 sq mi)
- Shore length^{1}: 14.18 kilometres (8.81 mi)
- Surface elevation: 236 metres (774 ft)
- References: NVE
- ^{1} Shore length is not a well-defined measure.

Digeren is a lake in Innlandet county, Norway. The 2.55-square-kilometre (0.98 sq mi) lake primarily lies in Kongsvinger Municipality and a very small part extends over the border into Eidskog Municipality to the south. The European route E16 highway runs along the north end of the lake, about 10 kilometres (6.2 mi) southeast of the town of Kongsvinger.

== See also ==
- List of lakes in Norway
