= Vestmarka Church =

Church in Innlandet, Norway

- Vestmarka kirke
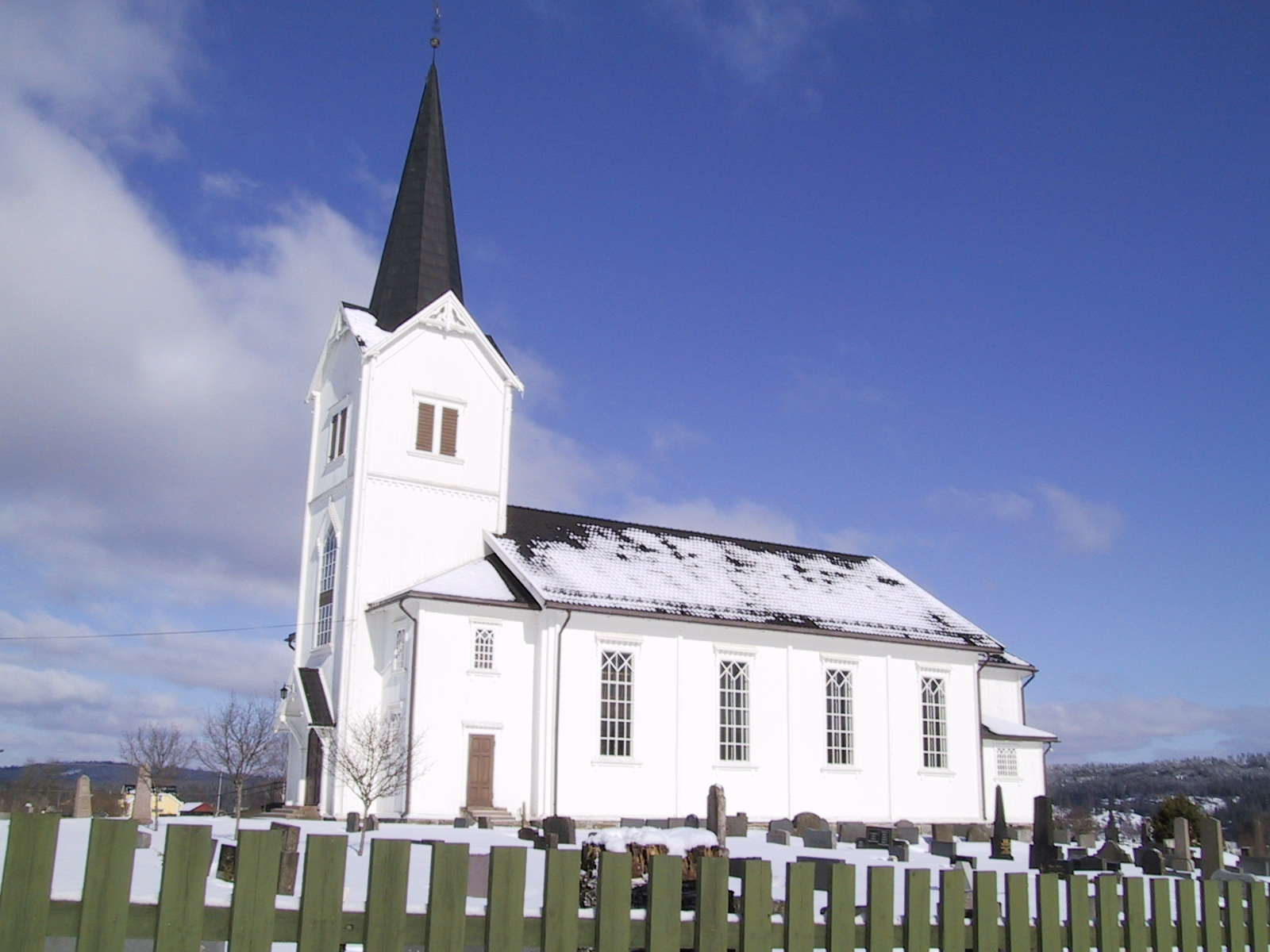
- View of the church
- Vestmarka Church
- 59°55′38″N 11°59′25″E
- Location: Eidskog Municipality, Innlandet
- Country: Norway
- Denomination: Church of Norway
- Churchmanship: Evangelical Lutheran

History
- Former name: Vestmarka kapell
- Status: Parish church
- Founded: 1883
- Consecrated: 1883

Architecture
- Functional status: Active
- Architect: Ludvig Bergh
- Architectural type: Long church
- Completed: 1883 (143 years ago)

Specifications
- Capacity: 300
- Materials: Wood

Administration
- Diocese: Hamar bispedømme
- Deanery: Solør, Vinger og Odal prosti
- Parish: Vestmarka
- Norwegian Cultural Heritage Site
- Type: Church
- Status: Not protected
- ID: 85814

Vestmarka Church (Norwegian: Vestmarka kirke) is a parish church of the Church of Norway in Eidskog Municipality in Innlandet county, Norway. It is located in the village of Vestmarka. It is the church for the Vestmarka parish which is part of the Solør, Vinger og Odal prosti (deanery) in the Diocese of Hamar. The white, wooden church was built in a long church design in 1883 using plans drawn up by the architect Ludvig Bergh. The church seats about 300 people.

== History ==
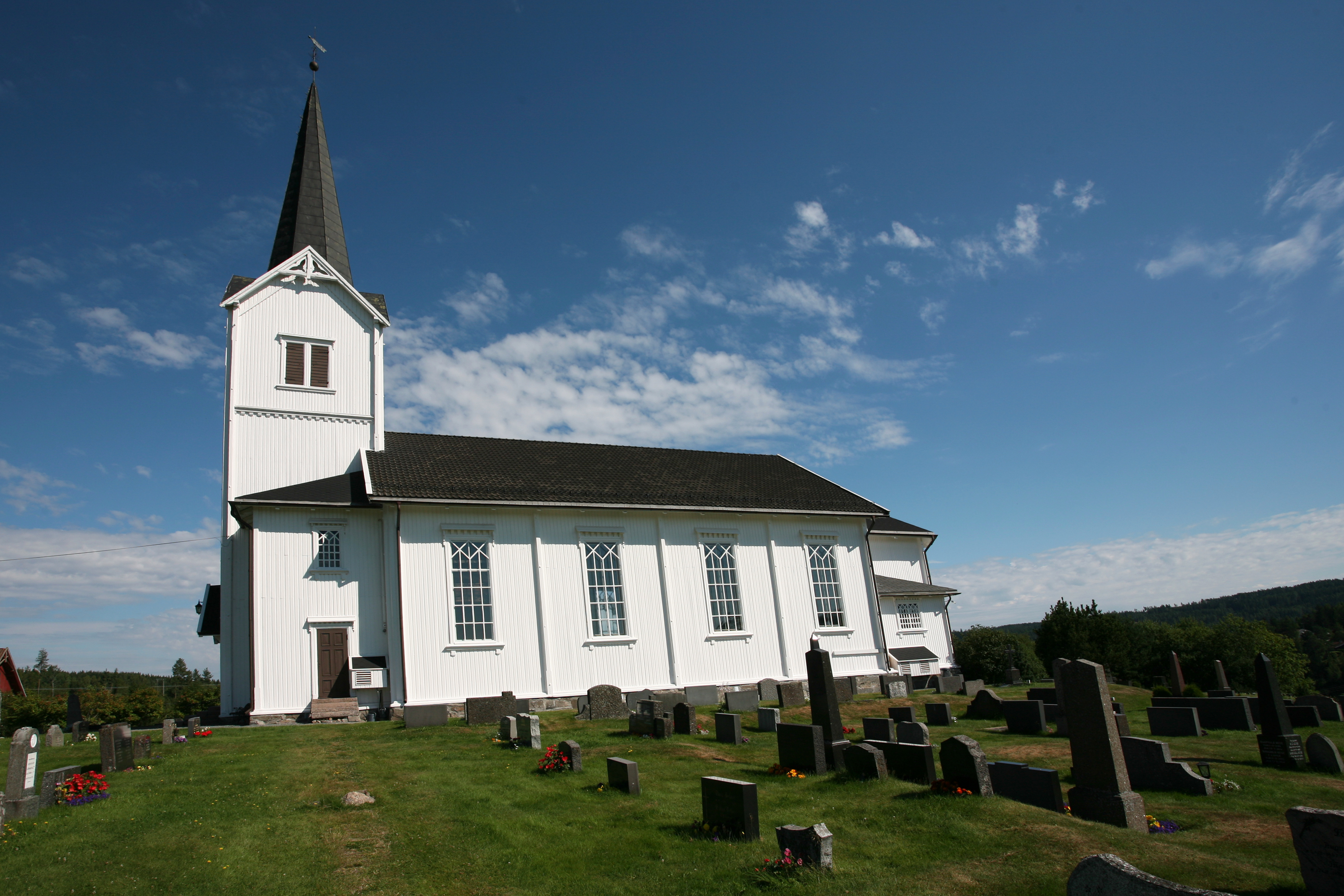
View of the church

Planning for a new chapel in Vestmarka took place in the early 1880s. The architect Ludvig Bergh was hired to design the building. It was a timber-framed long church with a rectangular nave and a narrower choir with a lower roof line. The choir is flanked by sacristies. The west end of the building has a church porch with a tower above it. Construction took place in 1883 and the new chapel was consecrated in 1883. During the late 20th century, the chapel was upgraded in status to a parish church and at that time it was renamed Vestmarka Church (before that time it was Vestmarka Chapel).

== See also ==
- List of churches in Hamar
