= Ivar Skulstad =

Norwegian politician

Ivar Arne Skulstad (born 16 May 1953) is a Norwegian politician for the Labour Party.

He was born in Eidskog as a son of an industrial laborer and a shop worker. He spent his career in the Norwegian Army from 1972 to 1973, Magnor Glassverk from 1973 to 1975, NSB Reisebyrå from 1975 to 1988 and Hedmark Energi from 1988 to 1999.

He was a member of the municipal council of Eidskog Municipality from 1979 to 2005, serving as deputy mayor from 1983 to 1987 and mayor from 1999 to 2005. From 2003 to 2005 he chaired Glåmdal regionråd. He served as a deputy representative to the Parliament of Norway during the terms 2005–2009 and 2009–2013, representing the constituency of Hedmark. From 2005 to 2009 he served as a regular representative, taking Sylvia Brustad's seat while she was a cabinet minister. He was a member of the Standing Committee on Scrutiny and Constitutional Affairs.
