= Skjervangen =

Lake in Innlandet, Norway

- Skjærvangen
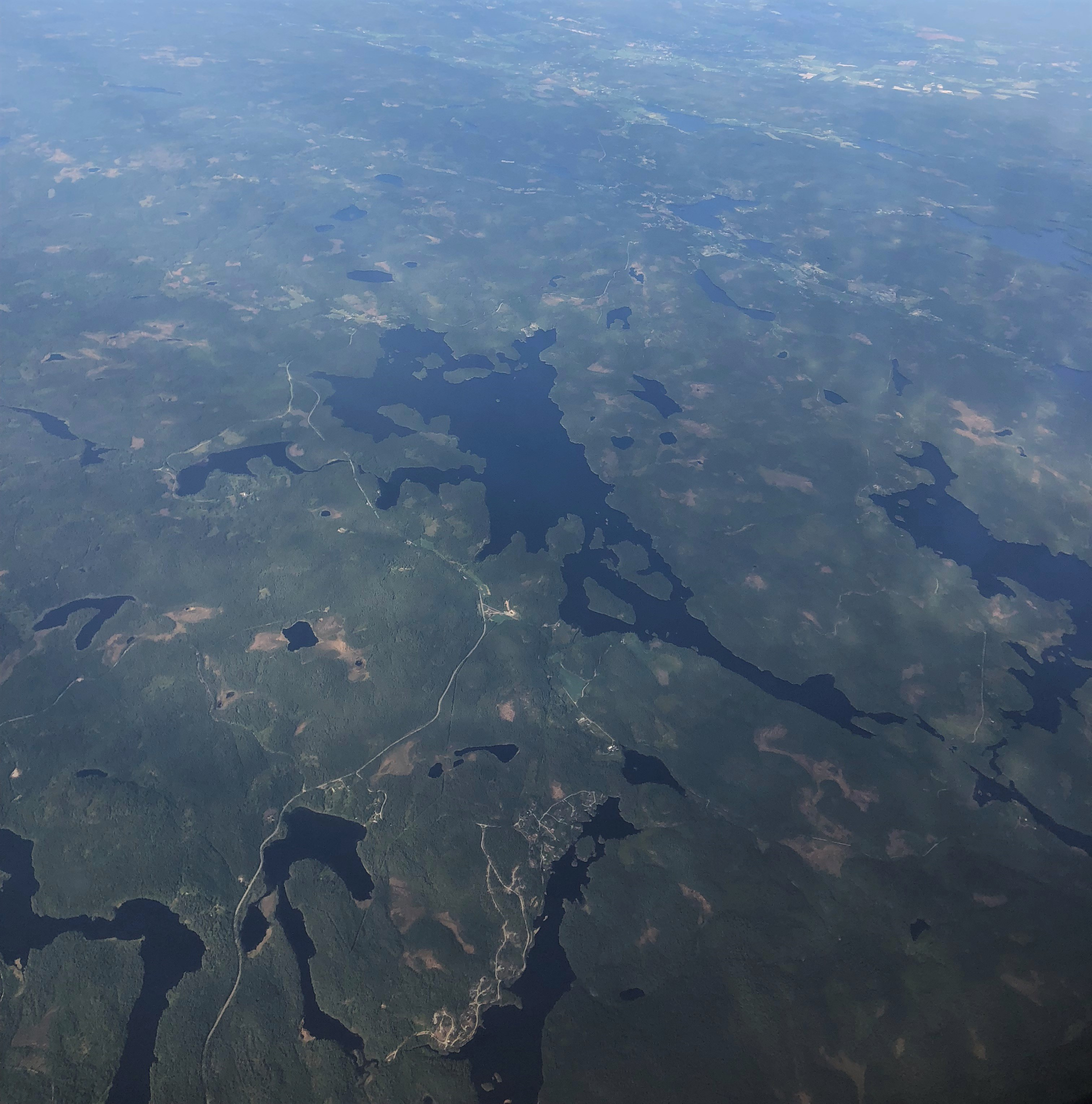
- Skjervangen (centre) seen from an aerial view
- Interactive map of the lake
- Location: Eidskog Municipality, Innlandet
- Coordinates: 59°54′26″N 11°53′22″E
- Basin countries: Norway
- Max. length: 6.3 kilometres (3.9 mi)
- Max. width: 2.2 kilometres (1.4 mi)
- Surface area: 5.626 km^{2} (2.172 sq mi)
- Shore length^{1}: 31.14 kilometres (19.35 mi)
- Surface elevation: 176 metres (577 ft)
- References: NVE
- ^{1} Shore length is not a well-defined measure.

Skjervangen is a lake in Eidskog Municipality in Innlandet county, Norway. The 5.626-square-kilometre (2.172 sq mi) lake lies less than 1 kilometre (0.62 mi) northwest of the border with Sweden and about 15 kilometres (9.3 mi) southwest of the village of Skotterud.

== See also ==
- List of lakes in Norway
