= Eda Municipality =

Eda Municipality Eda kommun
- Municipality
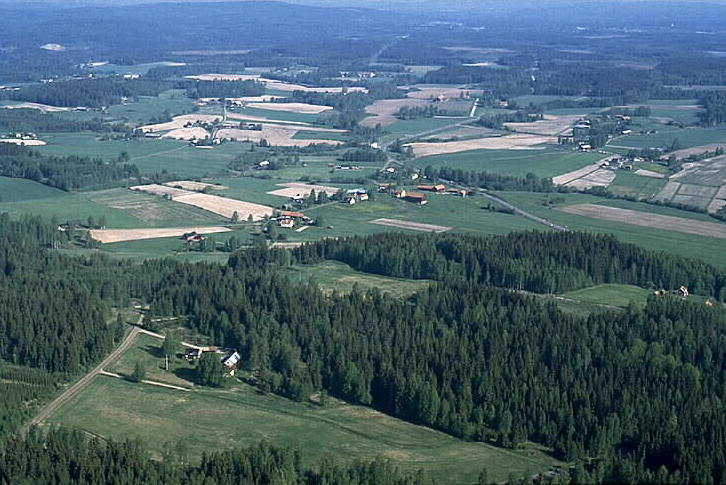

- Coat of arms

- Coordinates: 59°53′N 12°17′E
- Country: Sweden
- County: Värmland County
- Seat: Charlottenberg

Area
  - Total: 894.92 km^{2} (345.53 sq mi)
  - Land: 820.18 km^{2} (316.67 sq mi)
  - Water: 74.74 km^{2} (28.86 sq mi)
- Area as of 1 January 2014.

Population (30 June 2025)
  - Total: 8,376
  - Density: 10.21/km^{2} (26.45/sq mi)
- Time zone: UTC+1 (CET)
  - Summer (DST): UTC+2 (CEST)
- ISO 3166 code: SE
- Province: Värmland
- Municipal code: 1730
- Website: www.eda.se

Eda Municipality (Swedish: Eda kommun) is a municipality in Värmland County in west central Sweden, on the Norwegian border. Its seat is located in the town of Charlottenberg.

The municipal reform of 1971 saw the forming of the present municipality through the amalgamation of "old" Eda with Köla and Järnskog.

== Localities ==
- Charlottenberg (seat)
- Eda glasbruk
- Koppom
- Åmotfors (partly)

== Demographics ==
This is a demographic table based on Eda Municipality's electoral districts in the 2022 Swedish general election sourced from SVT's election platform, in turn taken from SCB official statistics.

In total there were 8,471 residents, including 5,458 Swedish citizens of voting age. 43.9% voted for the left coalition and 55.2% for the right coalition. Indicators are in percentage points except population totals and income.

Location	Residents	Citizen adults	Left vote	Right vote	Employed	Swedish parents	Foreign heritage	Income SEK	Degree
Location			%	%					
Charlottenberg	2,037	1,311	39.7	59.8	67	71	29	25,208	23
Charlottenberg C	2,020	1,135	48.6	50.3	58	49	51	20,286	50
Koppom	1,565	1,079	42.3	56.3	67	78	22	21,293	21
Köla-Skillingmark	1,153	842	43.3	55.7	76	82	18	26,227	26
Åmotfors	1,696	1,091	49.4	50.0	65	70	30	22,365	22
Source: SVT

== Government and politics ==
Distribution of the 35 seats in the municipal council after the 2010 election:

- Social Democratic Party 11
- Centre Party 10
- Hela Edas Lista 8
- Moderate Party 4
- Christian Democrats 1
- Liberal People's Party 1

Results of the 2010 Swedish general election in Eda:

- Social Democratic Party 43.0%
- Moderate Party 22.7%
- Centre Party 12.3%
- Sweden Democrats 5.7%
- Left Party 4.6%
- Christian Democrats 4.0%
- Liberal People's Party 3.7%
- Green Party 2.8%

== Sights ==
The Eda Fortlet (Eda skans), which was in use from 1650 to 1814, was the largest fortress in the province of Värmland. Its purpose was to defend against Norwegian troops. It was made obsolete with the Union between Sweden and Norway in 1814. A museum opened on the site in 1996.
