= Magnor =

Village in Eidskog Municipality, Norway

- Village
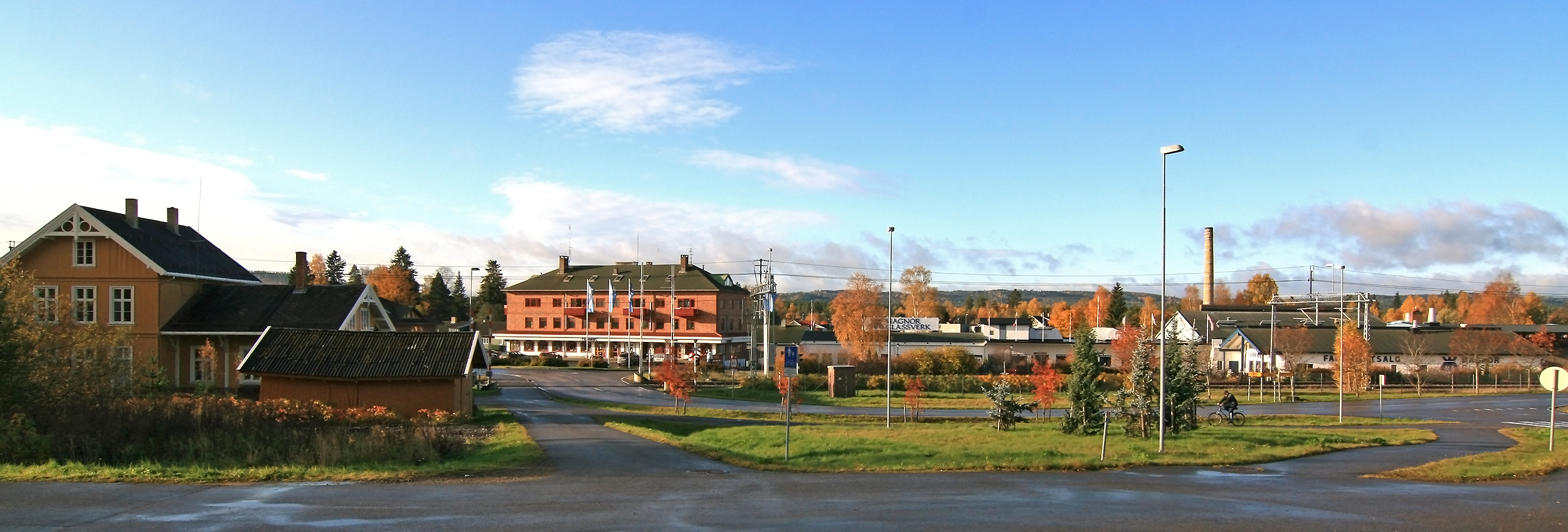
- View of Magnor, with the old train station on the left and Magnor Glassverk on the right
- Interactive map of Magnor
- Location within Innlandet Location within Norway
- Coordinates: 59.95092°N 12.20151°E
- Country: Norway
- Region: Eastern Norway
- County: Innlandet
- District: Vinger
- Municipality: Eidskog Municipality

Area
  - Total: 1.41 km^{2} (0.54 sq mi)
- Elevation: 150 m (490 ft)

Population (2024)
  - Total: 940
  - Density: 667/km^{2} (1,730/sq mi)
- Time zone: UTC+01:00 (CET)
  - Summer (DST): UTC+02:00 (CEST)
- Post Code: 2240 Magnor

Magnor is a village in Eidskog Municipality in Innlandet county, Norway. The village is located 3 kilometres (1.9 mi) from the border with Sweden. The village lies along the Norwegian National Road 2 and the Kongsvingerbanen railway line. The municipal centre, Skotterud lies about 6 kilometres (3.7 mi) to the northwest of Magnor and the Swedish village of Charlottenberg lies about 10 kilometres (6.2 mi) to the southeast of Magnor.

The 1.41-square-kilometre (350-acre) village has a population (2024) of 940 and a population density of 667 inhabitants per square kilometre (1,730/sq mi).

== History ==
The village is known as a production site for glass, made at Magnor Glassverk (lit. 'Magnor Glass Works') and also for the production of aluminium, made at Hydro Extrusion Norway.

During the border wars in the middle of the 17th century, there were fortifications in the area. In 1914, the famous Peace Monument was built in Magnor. It was designed by the Swedish architect Lars Johan Lehming and funded by the Swedish Peace and Arbitration Society to celebrate the peaceful dissolution of the union between Sweden and Norway in 1905.
