= Matrand =

Village in Eidskog Municipality, Norway

- Village
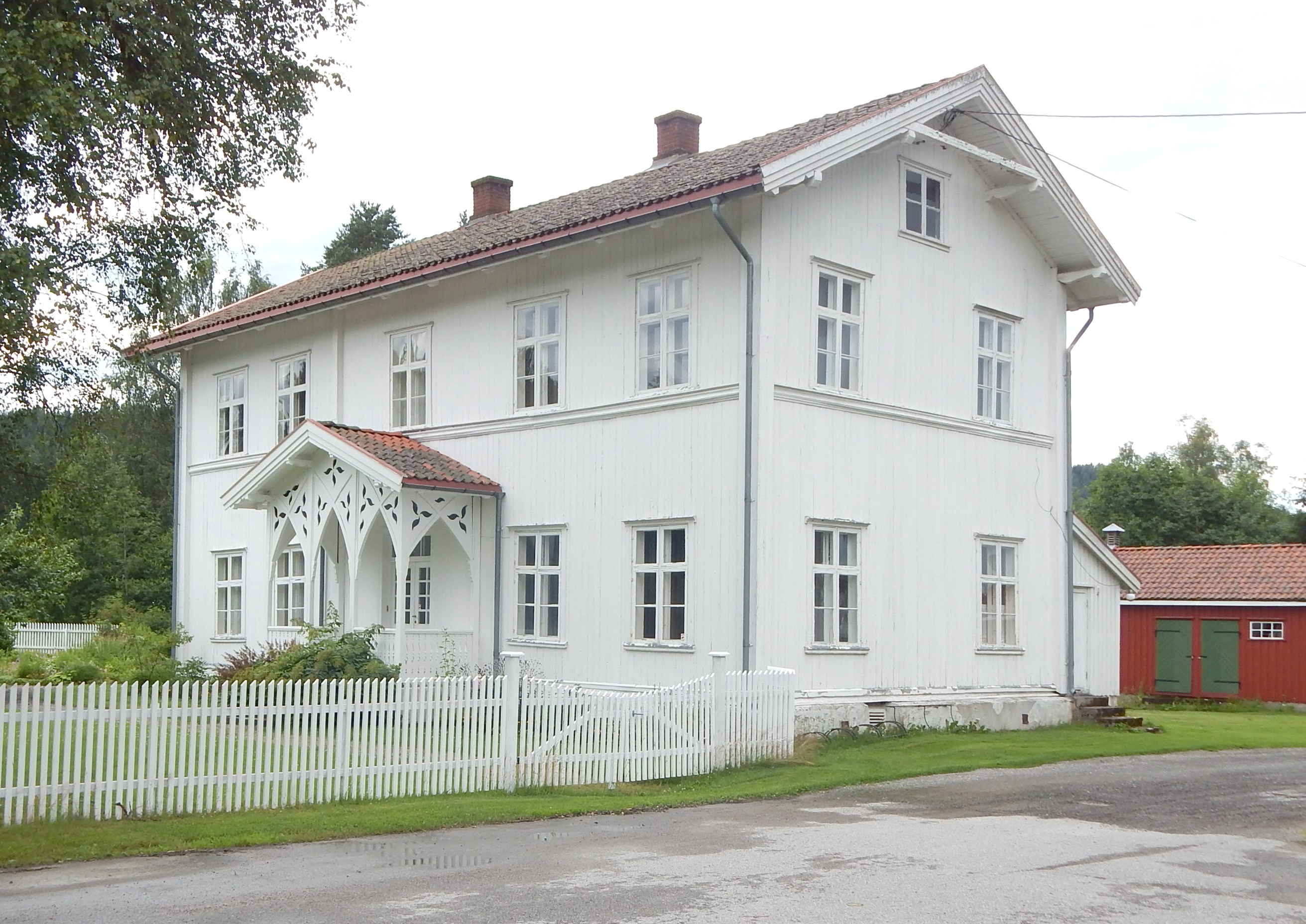
- View of the Eidskog School Museum in Matrand
- Interactive map of Matrand
- Location within Innlandet Location within Norway
- Coordinates: 60.02921°N 12.12438°E
- Country: Norway
- Region: Eastern Norway
- County: Innlandet
- District: Vinger
- Municipality: Eidskog Municipality
- Elevation: 135 m (443 ft)
- Time zone: UTC+01:00 (CET)
  - Summer (DST): UTC+02:00 (CEST)
- Post Code: 2235 Matrand

Matrand is a village in Eidskog Municipality in Innlandet county, Norway. The village is located approximately 20 kilometres (12 mi) south of the town of Kongsvinger and about 5 kilometres (3.1 mi) north of the village of Skotterud. Matrand is approximately 15 kilometres (9.3 mi) northwest of the border with Sweden. The village is located along the Norwegian National Road 2 and the Kongsvingerbanen railway line.

== History ==
=== Battle of Matrand ===
Matrand was host to the bloodiest battle of the entire Swedish-Norwegian War of 1814. This was where Lieutenant Colonel Andreas Samuel Krebs (1766-1818), who was leading the Norwegian forces, attacked the temporary stronghold set up by the Swedish forces led by Major General Carl Pontus Gahn (1759–1825).

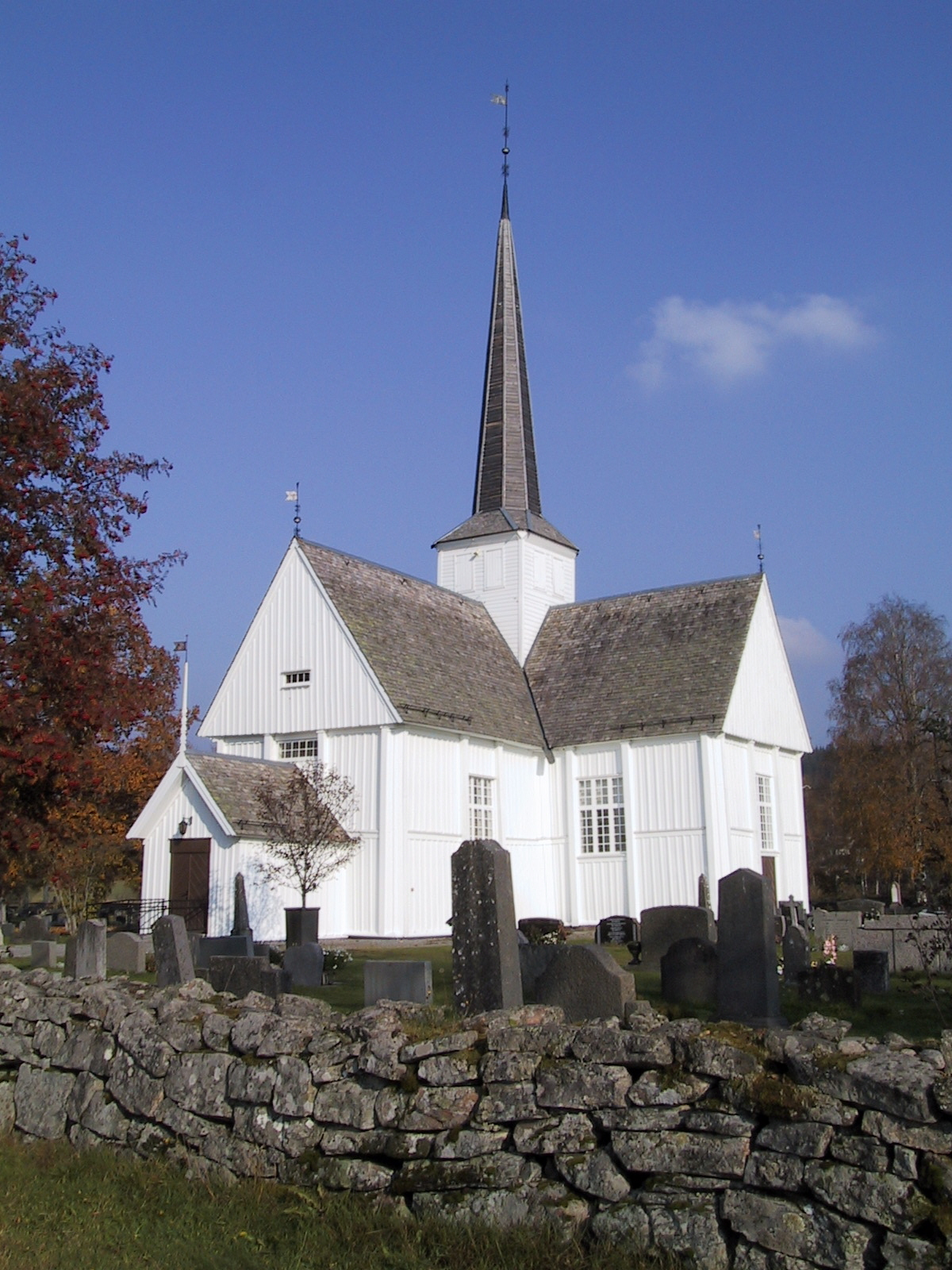
Eidskog Church at Matrand

== Attractions ==
=== Eidskog Church ===
Eidskog Church is located at Matrand. It was built of wood in 1665. The architect and builder was Knut Mortensen. The church has a baroque altarpiece from 1667. The brass baptismal font was given as a gift to the church in 1682. An Olsen & Jørgensen organ from 1898 was restored in 1974. The church is part of the Diocese of Hamar and can seat 350 people.

=== Eidskog Museum ===
The Eidskog Museum is located at Matrand. It was officially opened on 7 June 1985 as the first museum facility in Eidskog. This building had been a primary school for Matrand from 1879 until 1971. There are permanent exhibitions of school material, as well as banner exhibitions.
