= Eidskog Church =

Church in Innlandet, Norway

- Eidskog kirke
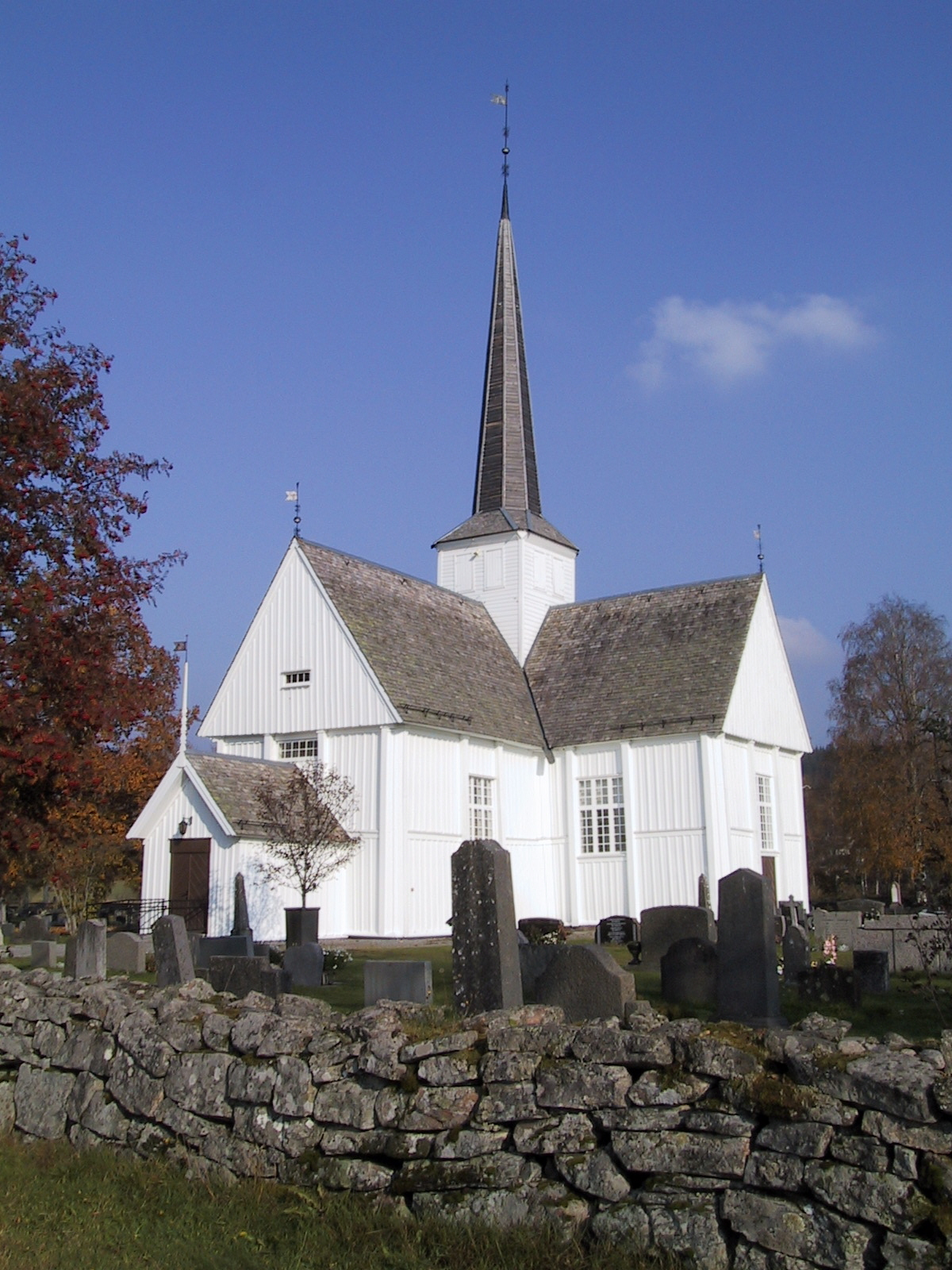
- View of the church
- Eidskog Church
- 60°01′48″N 12°07′31″E
- Location: Eidskog Municipality, Innlandet
- Country: Norway
- Denomination: Church of Norway
- Previous denomination: Catholic Church
- Churchmanship: Evangelical Lutheran

History
- Status: Parish church
- Founded: 11th century
- Consecrated: 1665

Architecture
- Functional status: Active
- Architect: Knut Mortensen
- Architectural type: Cruciform
- Completed: 1665 (361 years ago)

Specifications
- Capacity: 350
- Materials: Wood

Administration
- Diocese: Hamar bispedømme
- Deanery: Solør, Vinger og Odal prosti
- Parish: Eidskog
- Norwegian Cultural Heritage Site
- Type: Church
- Status: Automatically protected
- ID: 84073

Eidskog Church (Norwegian: Eidskog kirke) is a parish church of the Church of Norway in Eidskog Municipality in Innlandet county, Norway. It is located in the village of Matrand. It is one of the churches for the Eidskog parish which is part of the Solør, Vinger og Odal prosti (deanery) in the Diocese of Hamar. The white, wooden church was built in a cruciform design in 1665 using plans drawn up by the architect Knut Mortensen. The church seats about 350 people.

== History ==
The earliest existing historical records of the church date back to the year 1225 in the book Hákonar saga Hákonarsonar in connection with King Hákon Hákonarson's journey to Värmland in 1225. This is not the year of construction, however. The first church in Eidskog was a wooden stave church that was likely built in the late 11th century. Shortly after the Black Death swept through Norway in 1349–1350, the old Eidskog Church burned down. A new wooden stave church was constructed on the same site. This new church was much larger than its predecessor.

In 1665, the old church was torn down and a new cruciform log building was constructed on the same site. It was designed and built by Knut Mortensen. A few years earlier, Mortensen had built the somewhat smaller Kvikne Church, and he used the same floor plan and design for this church as well. In 1861, a new tower was constructed. This somewhat skewed central tower was built by Oluf Wernersen (son of Werner Olsen). The church was originally built with no exterior siding to cover the log walls, but was later given vertical wood panels for siding. From 1814 to 1856, there were visible bullet marks in the siding after nearby skirmishes during the Napoleonic Wars. In 1856, the church siding was replaced and the roof was redone with slate tiles.

On the midnight of February 1, 2017, the church witnessed its first religious same-sex marriage in Norway, shortly after Church’s new marriage liturgy went into force.

== Media gallery ==
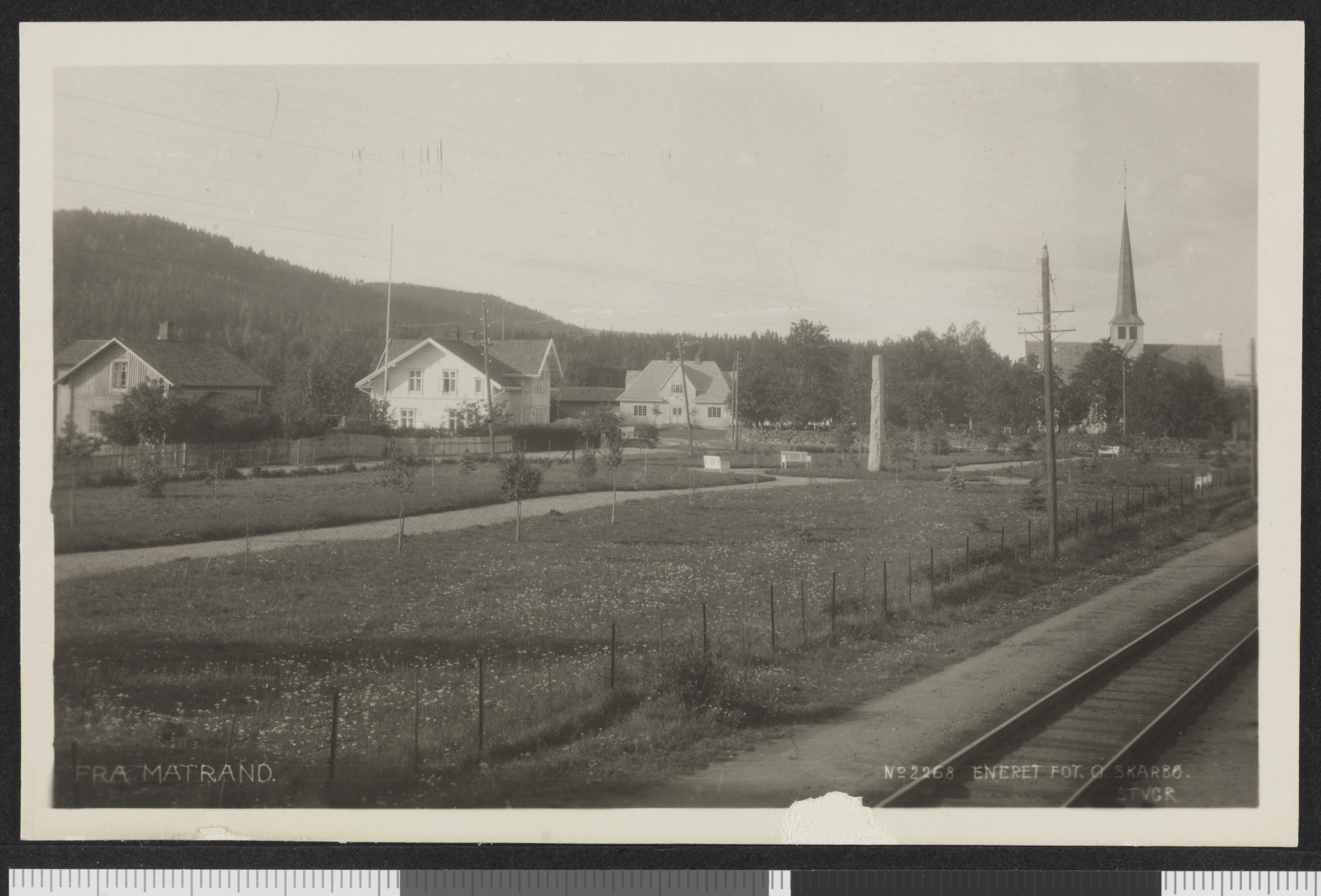

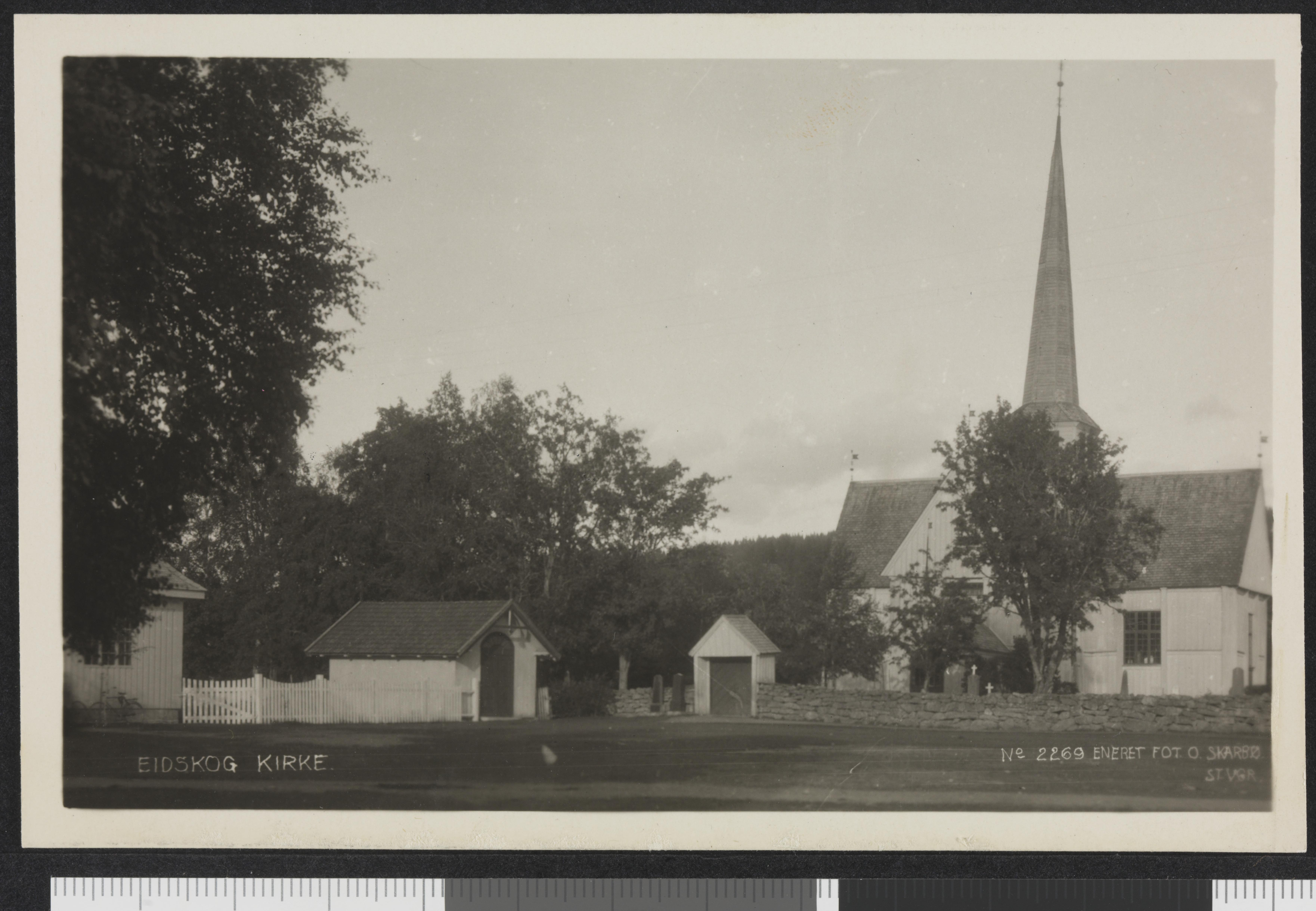

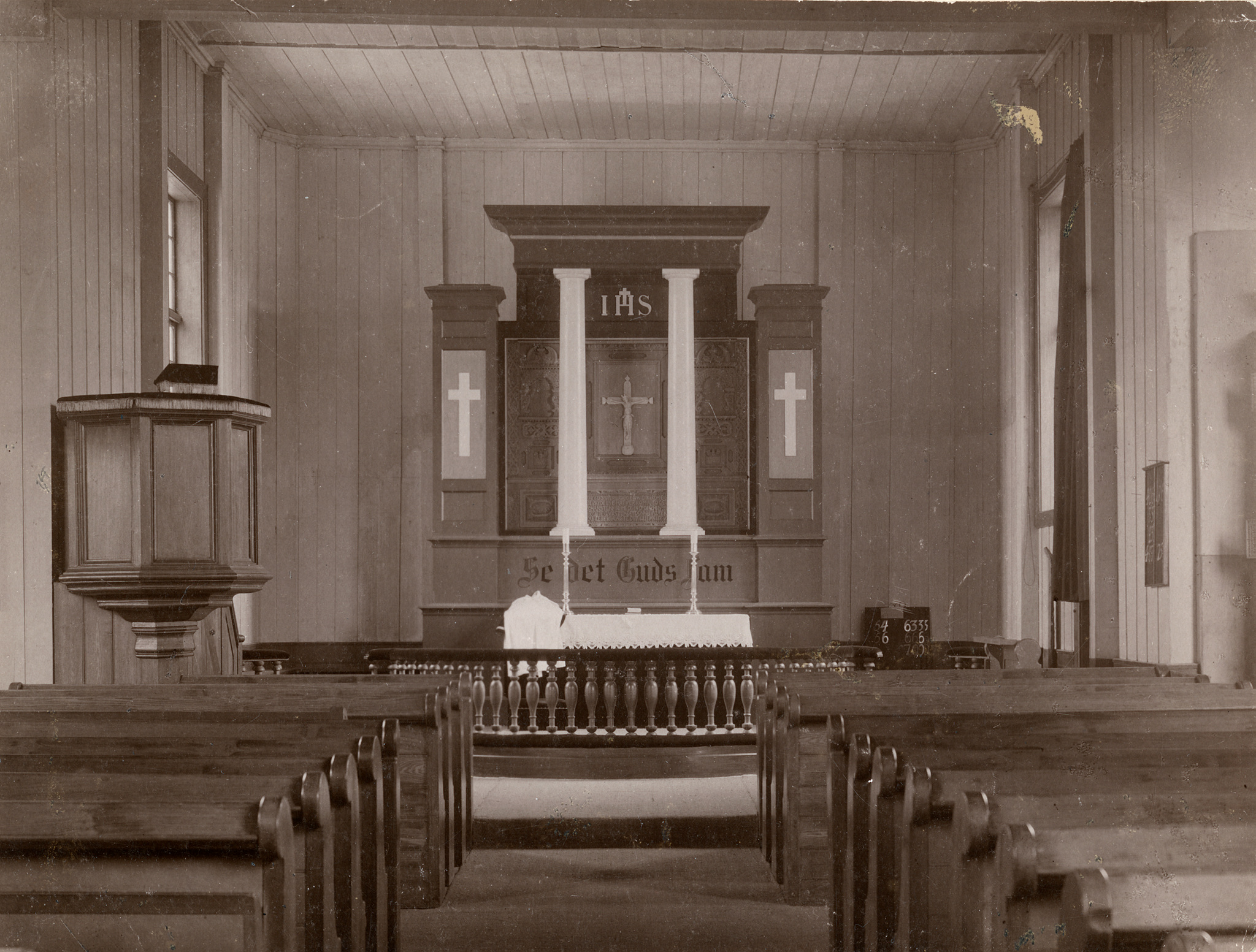

== See also ==
- List of churches in Hamar
