= Skotterud =

Village in Eidskog Municipality, Norway

- Village
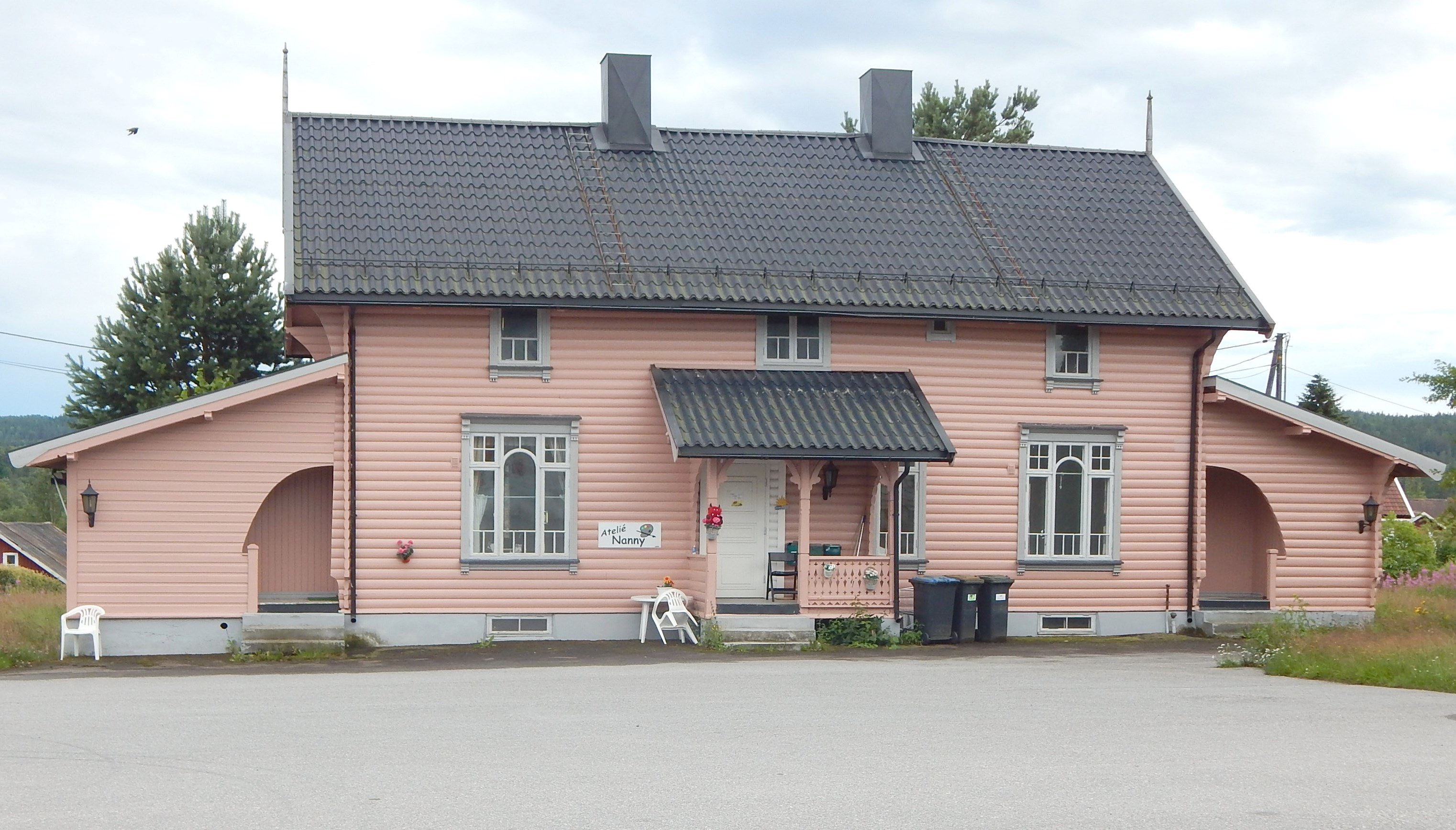
- View of a house in the centre of Skotterud
- Interactive map of Skotterud
- Location within Innlandet Location within Norway
- Coordinates: 59.9828°N 12.12809°E
- Country: Norway
- Region: Eastern Norway
- County: Innlandet
- District: Vinger
- Municipality: Eidskog Municipality

Area
  - Total: 1.54 km^{2} (0.59 sq mi)
- Elevation: 140 m (460 ft)

Population (2024)
  - Total: 1,398
  - Density: 908/km^{2} (2,350/sq mi)
- Time zone: UTC+01:00 (CET)
  - Summer (DST): UTC+02:00 (CEST)
- Post Code: 2230 Skotterud

Skotterud is the administrative centre of Eidskog Municipality in Innlandet county, Norway. The village is located along the Norwegian National Road 2 and the Kongsvingerbanen railway line. Skotterud sits about 25 kilometres (16 mi) south of the town of Kongsvinger and about 6 kilometres (3.7 mi) northwest of the village of Magnor which sits just inside the border with Sweden.

The 1.54-square-kilometre (380-acre) village has a population (2024) of 1,398 and a population density of 908 inhabitants per square kilometre (2,350/sq mi).

The village is located about 9 kilometres (5.6 mi) from Sweden, so there is some commercial and tourist traffic in the village. The local industry is heavily associated with forestry, including some sawmills and other timber-related businesses.
