= Skasenden =

Village in Grue Municipality, Norway

- Village
- Interactive map of Skasenden
- Location within Innlandet Location within Norway
- Coordinates: 60.42823°N 12.25877°E
- Country: Norway
- Region: Eastern Norway
- County: Innlandet
- District: Solør
- Municipality: Grue Municipality
- Elevation: 270 m (890 ft)
- Time zone: UTC+01:00 (CET)
  - Summer (DST): UTC+02:00 (CEST)
- Post Code: 2260 Kirkenær

Skasenden is a village in Grue Municipality in Innlandet county, Norway. The village is located at the northern end of the lake Skasen between the villages of Kirkenær and Svullrya.
