= Bergesida =

Village in Grue Municipality, Norway

- Village
- Interactive map of Bergesida
- Location within Innlandet Location within Norway
- Coordinates: 60.45495°N 12.09983°E
- Country: Norway
- Region: Eastern Norway
- County: Innlandet
- District: Solør
- Municipality: Grue Municipality

Area
  - Total: 0.13 km^{2} (0.050 sq mi)
- Elevation: 211 m (692 ft)

Population (2009)
  - Total: 205
  - Density: 1,576.9/km^{2} (4,084/sq mi)
- Time zone: UTC+01:00 (CET)
  - Summer (DST): UTC+02:00 (CEST)
- Post Code: 2260 Kirkenær

Bergesida is a village in Grue Municipality in Innlandet county, Norway. The village is located about 3 kilometres (1.9 mi) east of the village of Kirkenær. The lake Gardsjøen (Grue) lies just south of the village.

The 0.13-square-kilometre (32-acre) village had a population (2009) of 205 and a population density of 1,576.9 inhabitants per square kilometre (4,084/sq mi). Since 2010, the population and area data for this village area has not been separately tracked by Statistics Norway.
