= Rotberget =

Village in Grue Municipality, Norway

- Village
- Interactive map of Rotberget
- Location within Innlandet Location within Norway
- Coordinates: 60.5158°N 12.54017°E
- Country: Norway
- Region: Eastern Norway
- County: Innlandet
- District: Solør
- Municipality: Grue Municipality
- Elevation: 392 m (1,286 ft)
- Time zone: UTC+01:00 (CET)
  - Summer (DST): UTC+02:00 (CEST)
- Post Code: 2256 Grue Finnskog

Rotberget is a village in Grue Municipality in Innlandet county, Norway. The village is located in the Finnskogen district, about 3.5 kilometres (2.2 mi) west of the Swedish border.

== History ==
Starting on 1 January 1838, Rotberget was administratively a part of Hof Municipality. On 1 January 1963, Hof became a part of Åsnes Municipality, and then on 1 January 1969 Rotberget was transferred to Grue Municipality. At that time Rotberget had twenty three inhabitants.
