= Åsta Holth =

Norwegian writer (1904–1999)

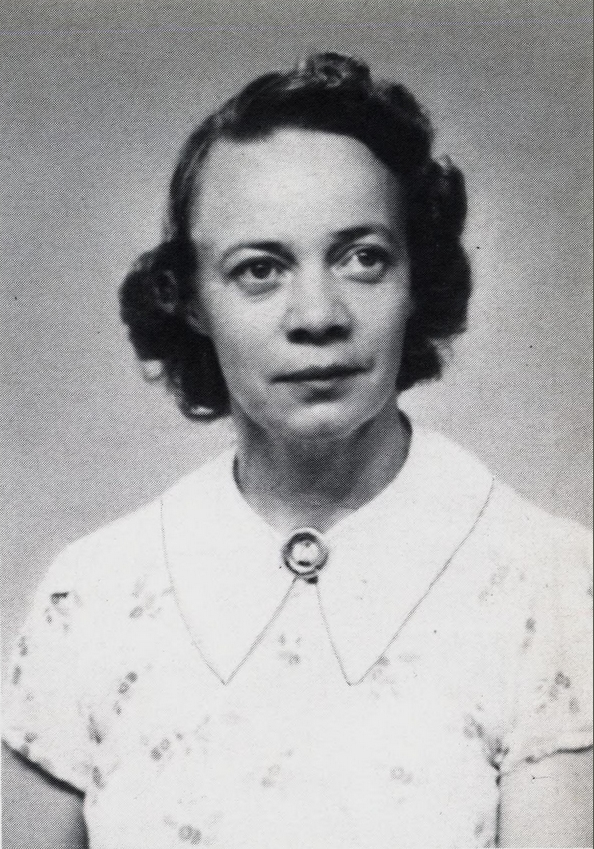
- Holth in 1945
- Born: 13 February 1904; Grue, Norway
- Died: 16 March 1999 (aged 95)
- Occupations: novelist, poet and short story writer

Åsta Holth (13 February 1904 – 16 March 1999) was a Norwegian novelist, poet and short story writer. She made her literary debut in 1944 with the short story collection Gamle bygdevegen. In 1946, she published the poetry collection Porkkalafela. She was awarded the Dobloug Prize in 1977.

== Biography ==
Holth was born at Svullrya in Grue Municipality in Hedmark county, Norway. She was of Forest Finnish descent. Many of her written works are about the residents of Finnskogen. Holth published a total of 19 books. She made her debut in 1929 with the play I Luråsen. Her breakthrough came with her novel Kornet og freden (1955) followed by Gullsmeden (1958) and Steinen bløder (1963). Her autobiography Piga came out in 1979. Holth was awarded the Dobloug Prize in 1977 and the King's Medal of Merit (Kongens fortjenstmedalje) in gold during 1984. She was decorated Knight, First Class of the Order of the Lion of Finland in 1994.

Very concerned with the preservation of Finnish culture in Norway, she founded the Finnskogdagane festival, held in the town of Svullrya every year. A memorial trail was opened during the 2017 festival.

In 2025, the album Eg vil gi min sang åt alle was issued, with 13 songs based on lyrics by Åsta Holth, and melodies by Kjetil Skaslien and Øivind Roos. Singers who contributed were Catharina Janner, Eva Vermundsberget, Cesilie Nielsen Skaslien, and Sinikka Langeland, with music played by Kjartan Gullikstad and others.
