= Namnå =

Village in Grue Municipality, Norway

- Village
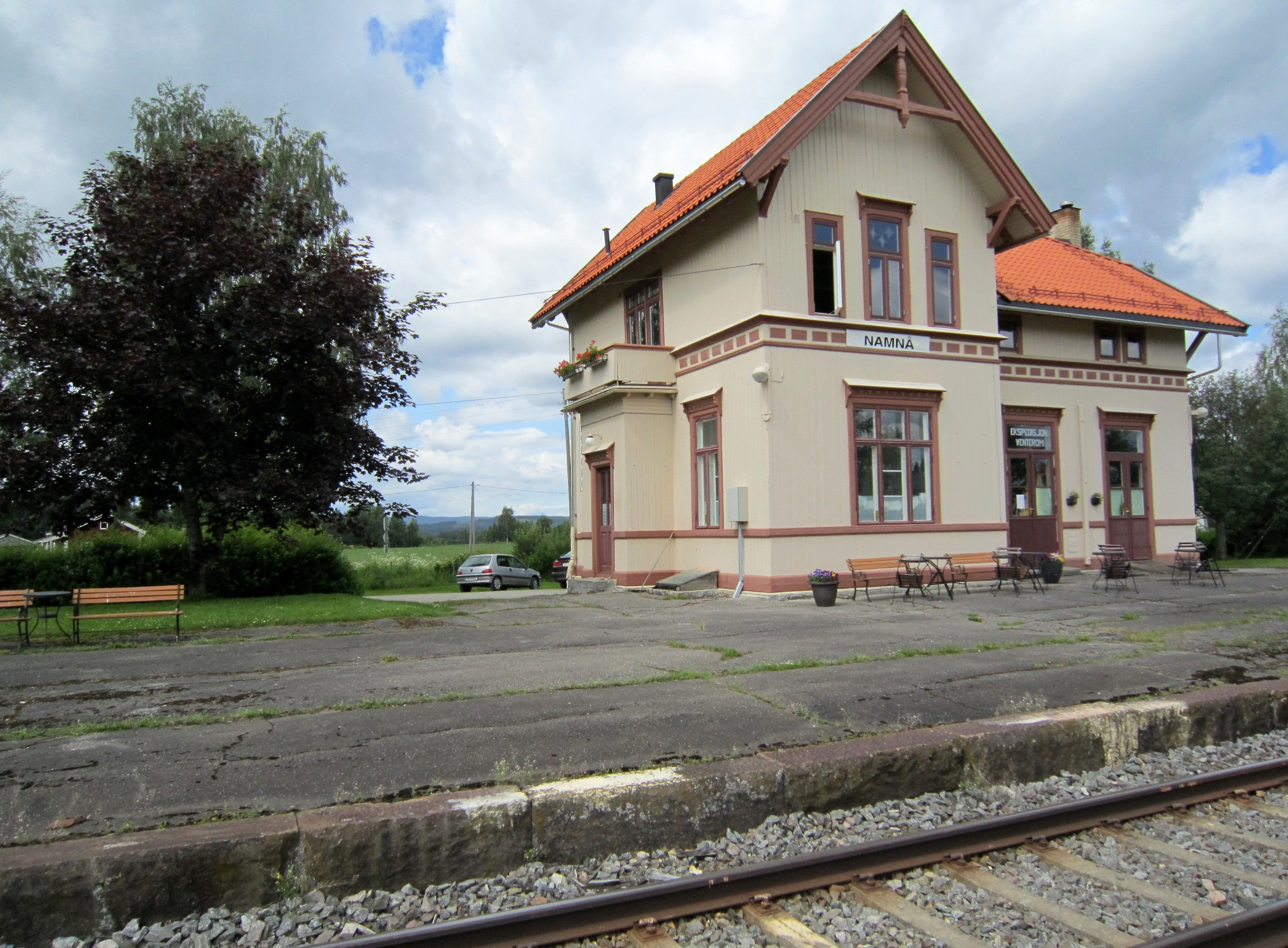
- View of the old railway station in Namnå
- Interactive map of Namnå
- Location within Innlandet Location within Norway
- Coordinates: 60.50015°N 12.07844°E
- Country: Norway
- Region: Eastern Norway
- County: Innlandet
- District: Solør
- Municipality: Grue Municipality

Area
  - Total: 0.66 km^{2} (0.25 sq mi)
- Elevation: 164 m (538 ft)

Population (2017)
  - Total: 357
  - Density: 540.9/km^{2} (1,401/sq mi)
- Time zone: UTC+01:00 (CET)
  - Summer (DST): UTC+02:00 (CEST)
- Post Code: 2265 Namnå

Namnå is a village in Grue Municipality in Innlandet county, Norway. The village is located on the east shore of the river Glomma, about 4 kilometres (2.5 mi) north of the village of Kirkenær. The Norwegian National Road 2 and the Solørbanen railway line both run through the village.

The 0.66-square-kilometre (160-acre) village has a population (2017) of 357 and a population density of 540.9 inhabitants per square kilometre (1,401/sq mi). Since 2018, the population and area data for this village area has not been separately tracked by Statistics Norway.
