= Grinder, Norway =

Village in Grue Municipality, Norway

Grinder
- Village
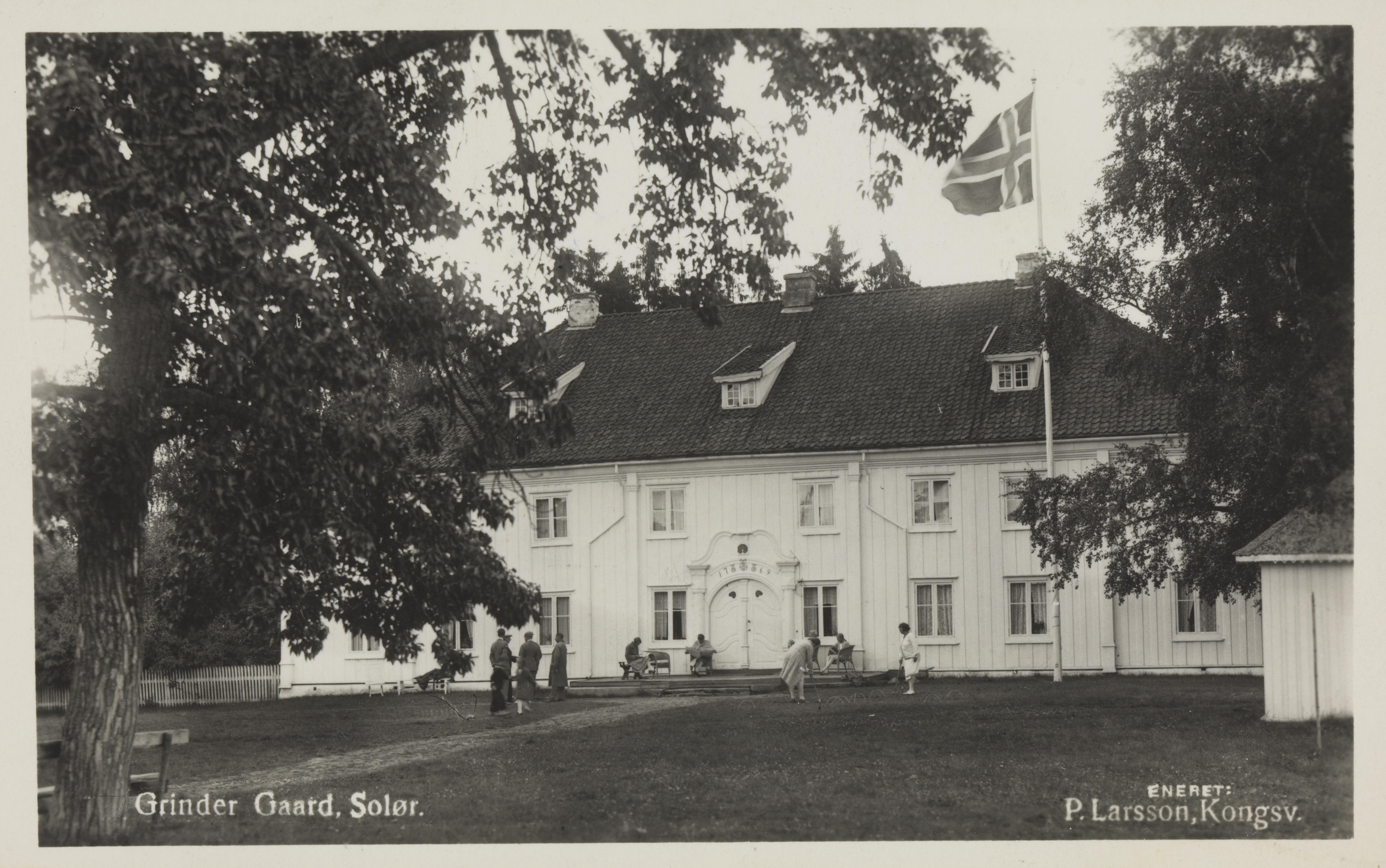
- View of the main house on the Grinder farm in the village
- Interactive map of Grinder
- Location within Innlandet Location within Norway
- Coordinates: 60.40764°N 12.04976°E
- Country: Norway
- Region: Eastern Norway
- County: Innlandet
- District: Solør
- Municipality: Grue Municipality

Area
  - Total: 0.76 km^{2} (0.29 sq mi)
- Elevation: 160 m (520 ft)

Population (2012)
  - Total: 256
  - Density: 336.8/km^{2} (872/sq mi)
- Time zone: UTC+01:00 (CET)
  - Summer (DST): UTC+02:00 (CEST)
- Post Code: 2264 Grinder

Grinder is a village in Grue Municipality in Innlandet county, Norway. The village is located on the eastern shore of the river Glomma, about 5.5 kilometres (3.4 mi) to the south of the village of Kirkenær. The Norwegian National Road 2 and the Solørbanen railway line both run through Grinder. The village is named after the large Grinder farm which covers about 1,500 decares (1.5 km^{2}; 0.58 sq mi) of cultivated land and forests.

The 0.76-square-kilometre (190-acre) village had a population (in 2012) of 256 and a population density of 336.8 inhabitants per square kilometre (872/sq mi). Since 2013, the population and area data for this village area has not been separately tracked by Statistics Norway.
