= Svullrya =

Village in Grue Municipality, Norway

Svullrya Grue Finnskog
- Village
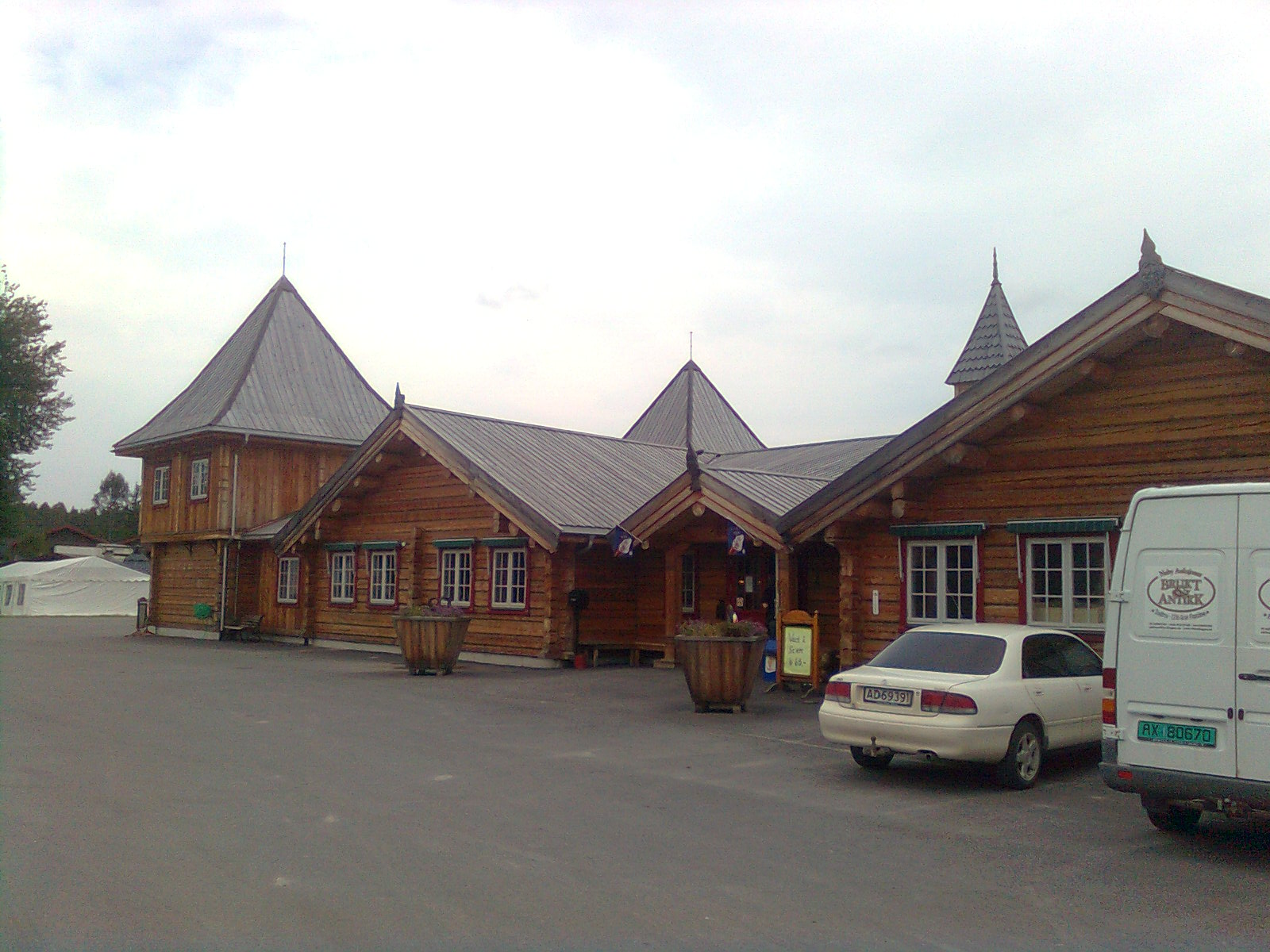
- View of the Finnskogen Kro og Motell, a restaurant in the area
- Interactive map of Svullrya
- Location within Innlandet Location within Norway
- Coordinates: 60.41597°N 12.40918°E
- Country: Norway
- Region: Eastern Norway
- County: Innlandet
- District: Solør
- Municipality: Grue Municipality
- Elevation: 260 m (850 ft)
- Time zone: UTC+01:00 (CET)
  - Summer (DST): UTC+02:00 (CEST)
- Post Code: 2256 Grue Finnskog

Svullrya is a village in Grue Municipality in Innlandet county, Norway. The village is located in the Finnskogen area, between the lakes Røgden and Skasen. The village is regionally important as a hub of the Finnskogen culture. The Grue Finnskog Church is located in the village.
