= Grue Church fire =

1822 fire in Norway

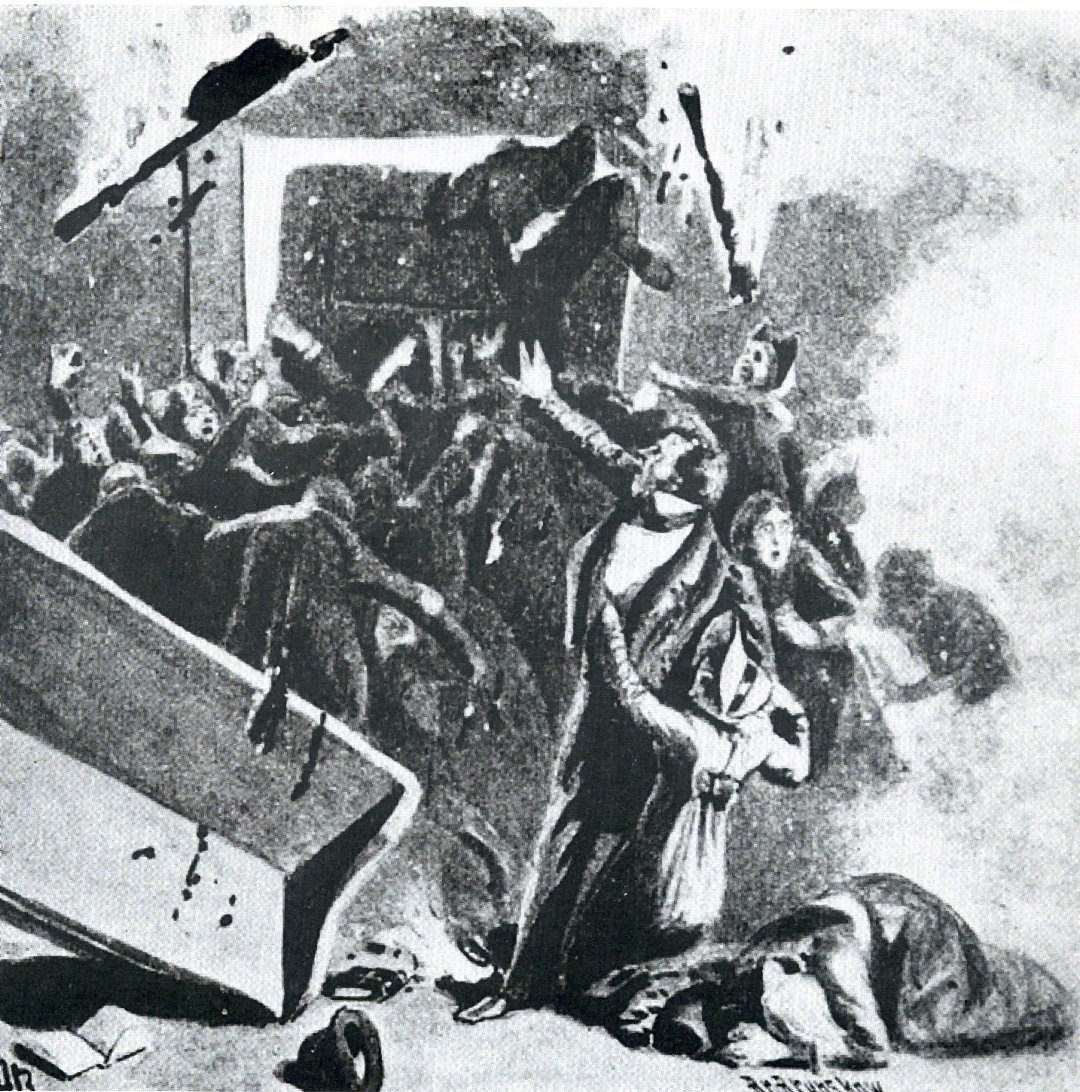
- Artist's impression of the fire; drawing by Andreas Bloch
- Date: Pentecost 1822 (26 May)
- Location: Grue, Norway; 60°28′18″N 12°2′59″E
- Deaths: At least 113

On 26 May 1822 there was a Pentecost worship service at the Grue Church near Kirkenær, Norway (in the present-day Grue Municipality). During the service, the church caught fire and at least 113 people were killed. It is the deadliest fire disaster in the history of Norway.

== Church ==
The old Grue Church was located close to Skulstad, north-west of Kirkenær in Solør. It was close to the bank of the River Glomma, and because of the likelihood that it would be undercut by erosion, a decision had been taken in 1794 to rebuild it further from the river, but this had not yet been done. An old woman had prophesied that the church would be destroyed on a Pentecost, either by water or by fire.

The church was made entirely of wood. The oldest section was believed to date to the 13th century and was built using the stave method. It had been rebuilt around 1600 with the addition of two transepts built with round, hand-worked logs and a tall central tower. Above the nave and the two transepts were wide galleries, allowing the church to accommodate up to 700 people. Both nave and transepts had entrance doors which swung inwards. The windows were placed high up on the wall. The exterior of the building was covered with waterproofing pine tar; subsequent calculations estimated that 17 tons of tar had been applied over the two hundred years before the fire.

== Fire ==
On 26 May 1822, a bright, hot day in early summer, 500–600 people were in the church for the Pentecost service, including mothers with babies to be baptised. As the vicar, Iver Hesselberg, was coming to the end of his sermon on weather and fire as images of the Holy Spirit, there was a loud noise as fire broke through the wooden wall. The church was completely destroyed in the ensuing blaze.

The three doors all opened inward, and the main, south door was soon blocked by fire. Panic broke out as the pressure of those trying to escape hindered keeping the doors open, and the north door itself blocked the exit for people descending from the north gallery. Some fell in front of the doors and others climbed over them. People jumped from the galleries onto those below, and some bodies were found crowded together in standing position. At least 113 people were killed; a total of 116 is also mentioned. The dead included 69 women and 36 children under the age of 15, but only eight or ten men. Unmarried young people and women traditionally sat separated from the men, who were closer to the south door and were able to escape through it before it became blocked, while other men, including the vicar, managed to save themselves by climbing out of the windows, although badly burnt by the melting stained glass. Many bodies were unidentifiable; Vogt Dines Guldberg Høegh, who had tried in vain to save lives by calming the crowd, was recognised by his sabre. The sabre is today on display in the sacristy of the new church.

On 1 June the victims were buried in five coffins (Høegh in a separate coffin) in a common grave dug where the altar of the destroyed church had been.

The cause of the fire was never discovered. One theory is that a spark from a fire vessel in which the church servant brought embers to light the altar candles could have set fire to the wall. Another theory was that someone had experimented with a burning-glass outside the church.

== Legacy ==
The new church, which is located in the center of Kirkenær, was completed in 1828. A standing stone was erected in front of it in 1922 in remembrance of the victims. In the spring of 2005 a historical marker with photos and a map was erected at Skulstad to the south of the location of the old church, which was covered by the river 40 years after the fire.

One consequence of the Grue Church fire was a law which was passed the following year prescribing that all doors of public buildings must swing outwards.

Peter Wessel Zapffe's novel Lyksalig pinsefest fire samtaler med Jørgen (lit. 'Blissful Pentecost: Four Dialogues with Jørgen') is based on the disaster, treating it as an instance of the problem of evil.

== Sources ==
- Østberg, Kristian (1897). Kirkebranden i Grue 1ste pinsedag 1822 (in Norwegian). Christiania: K. Østberg. OCLC 467944411.
