= Skasen =

Lake in Innlandet, Norway

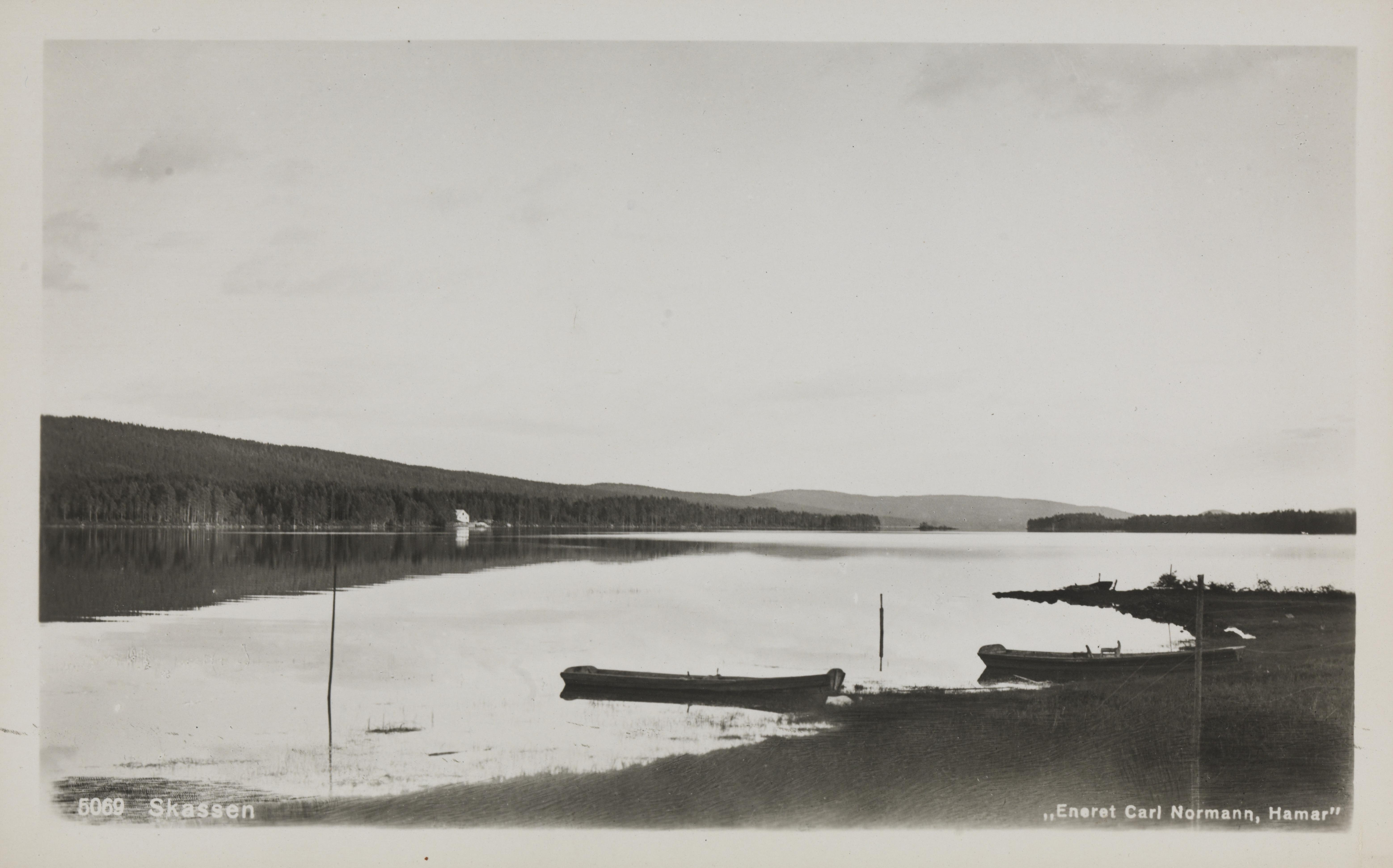
- View of the lake (c. 1920)
- Interactive map of the lake
- Location: Solør, Innlandet
- Coordinates: 60°23′47″N 12°18′58″E
- Primary outflows: Skasåa river
- Basin countries: Norway
- Max. length: 8.8 kilometres (5.5 mi)
- Max. width: 2.5 kilometres (1.6 mi)
- Surface area: 13.41 km^{2} (5.18 sq mi)
- Shore length^{1}: 30.71 kilometres (19.08 mi)
- Surface elevation: 266 metres (873 ft)
- References: NVE
- ^{1} Shore length is not a well-defined measure.

Skasen is a lake in Grue Municipality and Kongsvinger Municipality in Innlandet county, Norway. The 13.41-square-kilometre (5.18 sq mi) lake lies in the Finnskogen forest area about 16 kilometres (9.9 mi) to the southeast of the village of Kirkenær and about 28 kilometres (17 mi) northeast of the town of Kongsvinger.

== See also ==
- List of lakes in Norway
