= Løvhaugsåa =

River in Innlandet, Norway

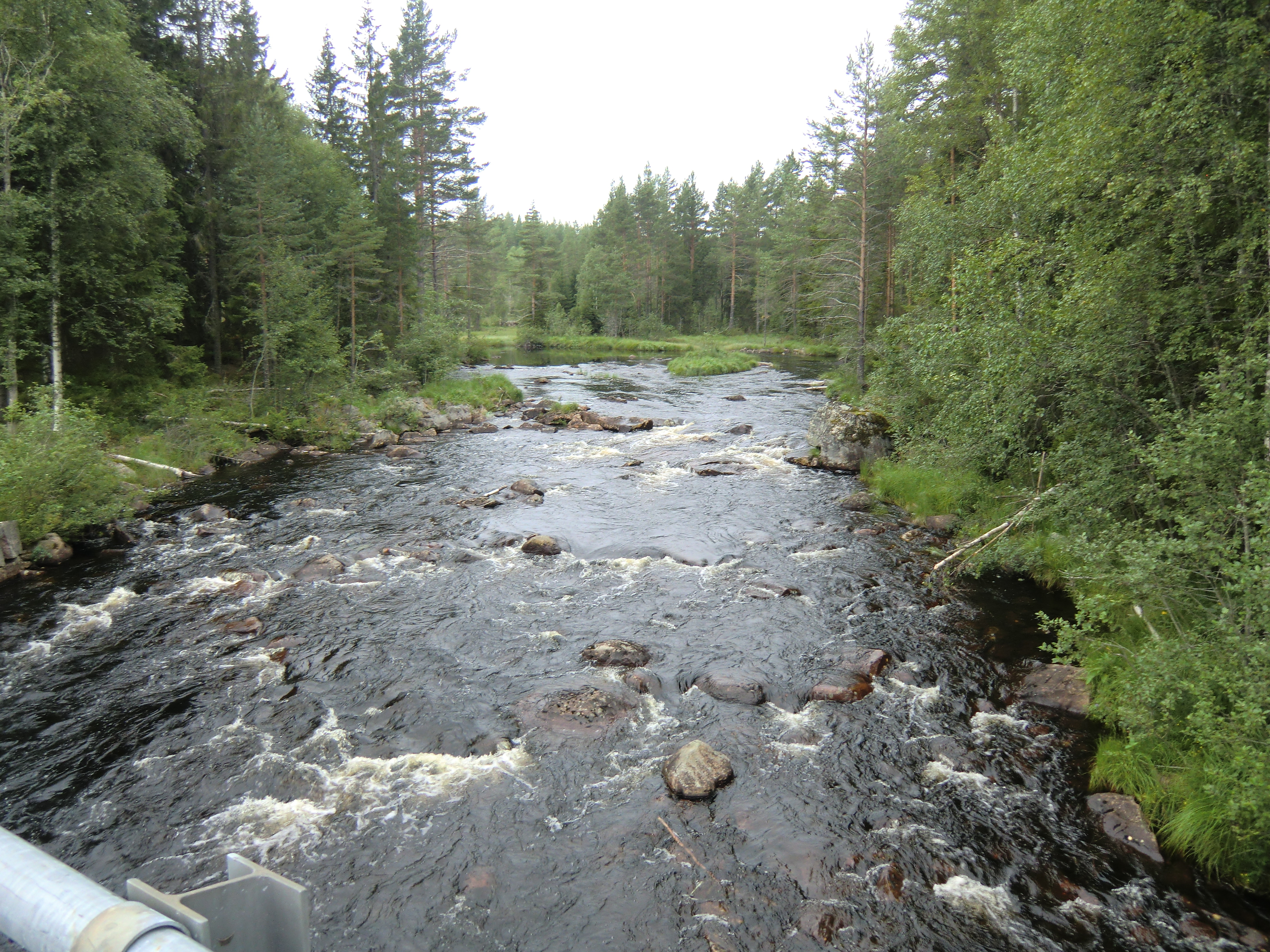

Location
- Country: Norway
- County: Innlandet
- Municipalities: Grue Municipality

Physical characteristics
- Source: Lake Rotbergsjøen
  - location: Grue, Norway
  - coordinates: 60.479899°N 12.52358°E
  - elevation: 330 metres (1,080 ft)
- Mouth: Lake Røgden
  - location: Grue, Norway
  - coordinates: 60.4370297°N 12.530347°E
  - elevation: 280 metres (920 ft)
- Length: 8.5 km (5.3 mi)
- Basin size: 167.26 km^{2} (64.58 sq mi)
- Discharge
  - average: 2.12 m^{3}/s (75 cu ft/s)

Løvhaugsåa is a river in Grue Municipality in Innlandet county, Norway. The river is approximately 8.5 kilometres (5.3 mi) long and it is located in the rural Finnskogen forest area. The river begins at the Nydammen (lit. 'new dam'), the southwest outlet of the large lake Rotbergsjøen and then it flows south to the larger lake Røgden.

== See also ==
- List of rivers in Norway
