= Sinikka Langeland =

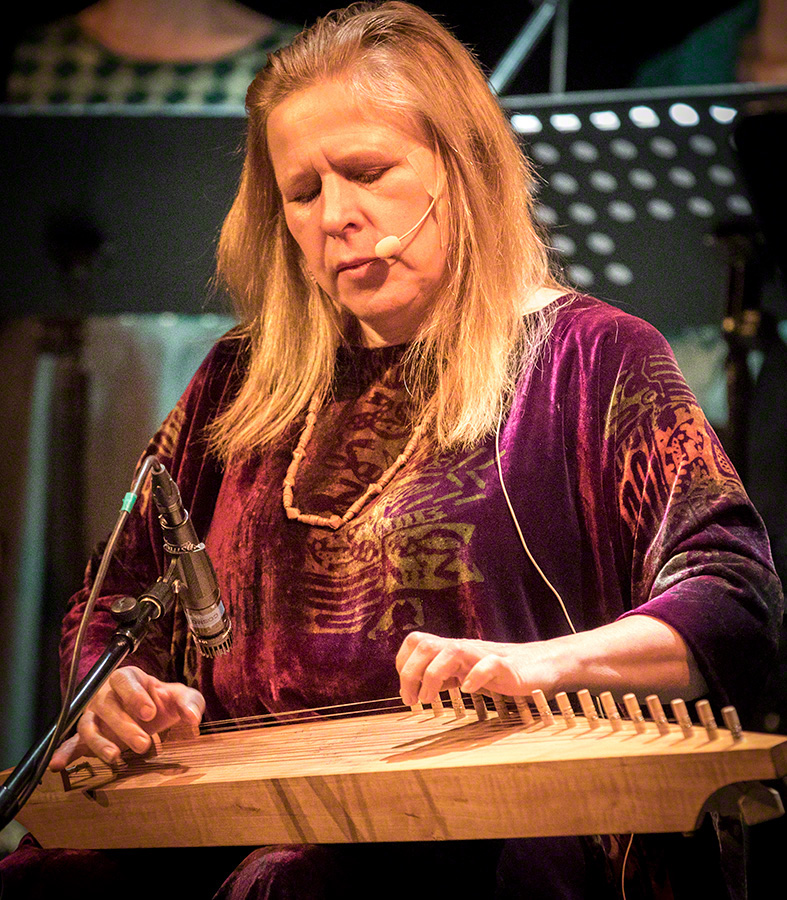
- Sinikka Langeland at stage in 2016

Background information
- Born: Anne Sinikka Langeland; 13 January 1961 (age 65); Grue, Hedmark
- Origin: Norway
- Genres: Traditional folk music, world music, jazz
- Occupation: Musician
- Instruments: Vocals, kantele
- Labels: ECM Records; Grappa Music
- Website: www.sinikka.no

Sinikka Langeland (born 13 January 1961) is a Norwegian traditional folk singer and musician (playing the kantele), known for combining traditional music with elements of jazz.

== Career ==
Langeland was born in Grue. She plays the Finnish National Instrument kantele, but she is also known for her "runesanger" and traditional "kveding". Langeland also teaches these instruments and song techniques. The work "Sammas Himmelsøyle" by langeland, was premiered with Trio Mediæval and Sinikka Langelands Ensemble Finnskogutstillingen in March 2012. This work is based on Finnish mythology, and was commissioned for Finnskogutstillingen. The week after the premiere the work was performed again in "Gamle Aker kirke", during the Oslo International Church Music Festival.

In 1996 Langeland was awarded Finnskogprisen. For the release Runoja she received the prestigious Edvardprisen in the class Music in the borderland in 2003. Together with Ove Berg she received the Norwegian-Finnish Cultural Fund Award in 2004 and in 2010 she was the trecipient of the Gammleng-prisen in the class Traditional folk music. In 2012 she received the Sibeliusprisen by Sibelius company in Norway.

Langeland was nominated for Spellemannprisen (1997) in the class Traditional folk music, for the album Strengen var af røde guld and Spellemannprisen (2000) in the class Traditional folk music/traditional dance music, for the album Lille Rosa. She contributed on Dølajazz 2006 with poems by Hans Børli, performed together with the jazz musicians Arve Henriksen and Trygve Seim, as well as the Finnish musician Markku Ounaskari. Langeland lives in Finnskogen in Grue Municipality.

John Kellman of the All About Jazz magazine recognized Sinikka Langeland Ensemble's appearance at Vossajazz March 2013, as no. 2 of his "Best Live Shows of 2013".

== Honors ==
- 1996: Finnskogprisen
- 2003: Edvardprisen in the class Music in the borderland for the album Runoja
- 2004: Norwegian-Finnish Cultural Fund Award
- 2010: Gammleng-prisen in the class Traditional folk music
- 2012: Sibeliusprisen

== Discography ==
=== Solo albums ===
- 1994: Langt Innpå Skoga (Grappa Music), with her own songs and music from Solør and Finnskogen
- 1995: Har Du Lyttet Til Elvene Om Natta (Grappa Music), poems by Hans Børli with Anders Jormin, Morten Halle, Peter Finger and Anders Engen
- 1997: Strengen Var Af Røde Guld (Grappa Music), ballads and songs collected by Ludvig Mathias Lindeman in the summer of 1864
- 2000: Lille Rosa - Kjærlighetsballader (Grappa Music)
- 2002: Runoja (Heilo) with Arve Henriksen, Bjørn Kjellemyr and Pål Thowsen
- 2007: Starflowers (ECM Records) with Anders Jormin, Arve Henriksen, Markku Ounaskari and Trygve Seim
- 2011: The Land That Is Not (ECM Records) with Arve Henriksen, Trygve Seim, Anders Jormin and Markku Ounaskari
- 2015: The Half-Finished Heaven (ECM Records) with Lars Anders Tomter, Trygve Seim and Markku Ounaskari
- 2016: The Magical Forest (ECM Records) with Arve Henriksen, Trygve Seim, Anders Jormin, Markku Ounaskari and Trio Mediæval
- 2021: Maria Magdalena (Lawo Classics)
- 2021: Wolf Rune (ECM Records)
- 2023: Wind and Sun (ECM Records)

=== Collaborations ===
With Streif

- 2000: Trollfugl (Lærdal Musikkproduksjon)
- 2006: Nordic Winter (Ozella) with Birger Mistereggen, Georg Michael Reiss, Tom Karlsrud and Torbjørn Økland

With Ove Berg

- 2002: Tirun Lirun – Skogsfinske Runesanger (Finnskogen Kulturverksted)

With Andreas Liebig

- 2002: Stjerneklang (Heilo), Norwegian folk melodies and Bach chorales Christmas, with Andreas Liebig on the Wagner Organ from Nidarosdomen

With Kåre Nordstoga

- 2004: Påskatona, Folk hymns / J. S. Bach. (Nordic Sound), including the Baroque organ at Nidarosdomen
- 2005: Kyriekoral, Norwegian folk hymns and Bach chorales (Nordic Sound)
- 2006: Hjartegangar (Nyrenning), with Knut Buen
- 2009: Maria's Song (ECM Records) with Lars Anders Tomter

== Bibliography ==
- 1997: Strengen var af Røde Guld, Medieval Ballads from Solør, songs collected by Ludvig Mathias Lindeman in 1864, Heidi Arild, Velle Espeland a.o. Ill.: Tore Hansen, Norsk folkeminnelags skrifter Nr 142
- 2001: Karhun Emuu (Mother bear), retelling of "runesanger" from Finnskogen, Comments by Professor Timo Leisiö, Ill.: Tore Hansen, 94 pp., Aschehoug
