= Grue Finnskog Church =

Church in Innlandet, Norway

- Grue Finnskog kirke
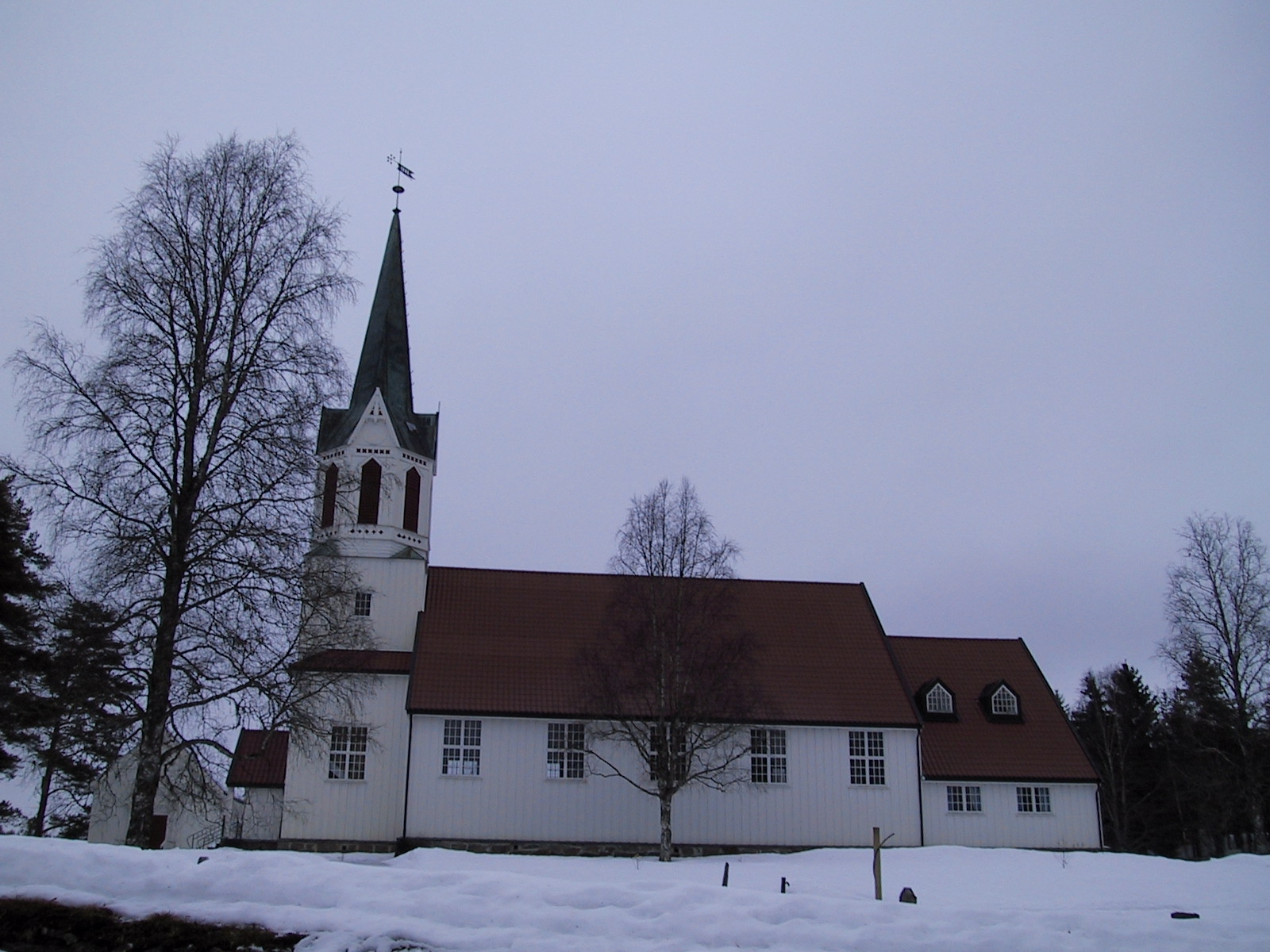
- View of the church
- Grue Finnskog Church
- 60°25′06″N 12°24′22″E
- Location: Grue Municipality, Innlandet
- Country: Norway
- Denomination: Church of Norway
- Churchmanship: Evangelical Lutheran

History
- Former name: Revholt kapell
- Status: Parish church
- Founded: 1862
- Consecrated: 26 November 1950

Architecture
- Functional status: Active
- Architect: Ola B. Aasness
- Architectural type: Long church
- Completed: 1950 (76 years ago)

Specifications
- Capacity: 340
- Materials: Wood

Administration
- Diocese: Hamar bispedømme
- Deanery: Solør, Vinger og Odal prosti
- Parish: Grue Finnskog
- Norwegian Cultural Heritage Site
- Type: Church
- Status: Not protected
- ID: 84435

Grue Finnskog Church (Norwegian: Grue Finnskog kirke) is a parish church of the Church of Norway in Grue Municipality in Innlandet county, Norway. It is located in the village of Svullrya. It is the church for the Grue Finnskog parish which is part of the Solør, Vinger og Odal prosti (deanery) in the Diocese of Hamar. The white, wooden church was built in a long church design in 1886 using plans drawn up by the architect Niels Stockfleth Darre Eckhoff and it was significantly rebuilt in 1950 by the architect Ola B. Aasness. The church seats about 340 people.

== History ==
A cemetery was built in the village of Svullrya in 1854 to serve the eastern part of the municipality. In 1862, a small church was built at the cemetery. The building was constructed by Brede Bredesen Kolstad from Kongsvinger who used drawings by the architect Jacob Wilhelm Nordan. The building had seating for about 200 people. The church had no tower, and it is said that the small church bell hung between two pillars outside the church door. This church was built in 1862 and consecrated on 4 March 1863.

In 1883, it was decided to demolish this church and replace it with a new one. The new church was designed by Niels Stockfleth Darre Eckhoff and the builder was Günther Schüssler. This building had a neo-Gothic design and it was a timber-framed long church with seating for about 430 people. This new church was consecrated on 8 December 1886.

On 28 January 1948, the roof of the church collapsed under the weight of the snow. The church tower and the western part of the nave remained, but the rest of the building was severely damaged. Some of the interior furnishings were saved. The church was rebuilt soon after using designs by the architect Ola B. Aasness. The lead builder was Kåre B. Bråten. The newly rebuilt church was consecrated on 26 November 1950. This new church has 340 seats.

== See also ==
- List of churches in Hamar
