= Grue Municipality =

Municipality in Innlandet, Norway

Grue Municipality Grue kommune
- Municipality
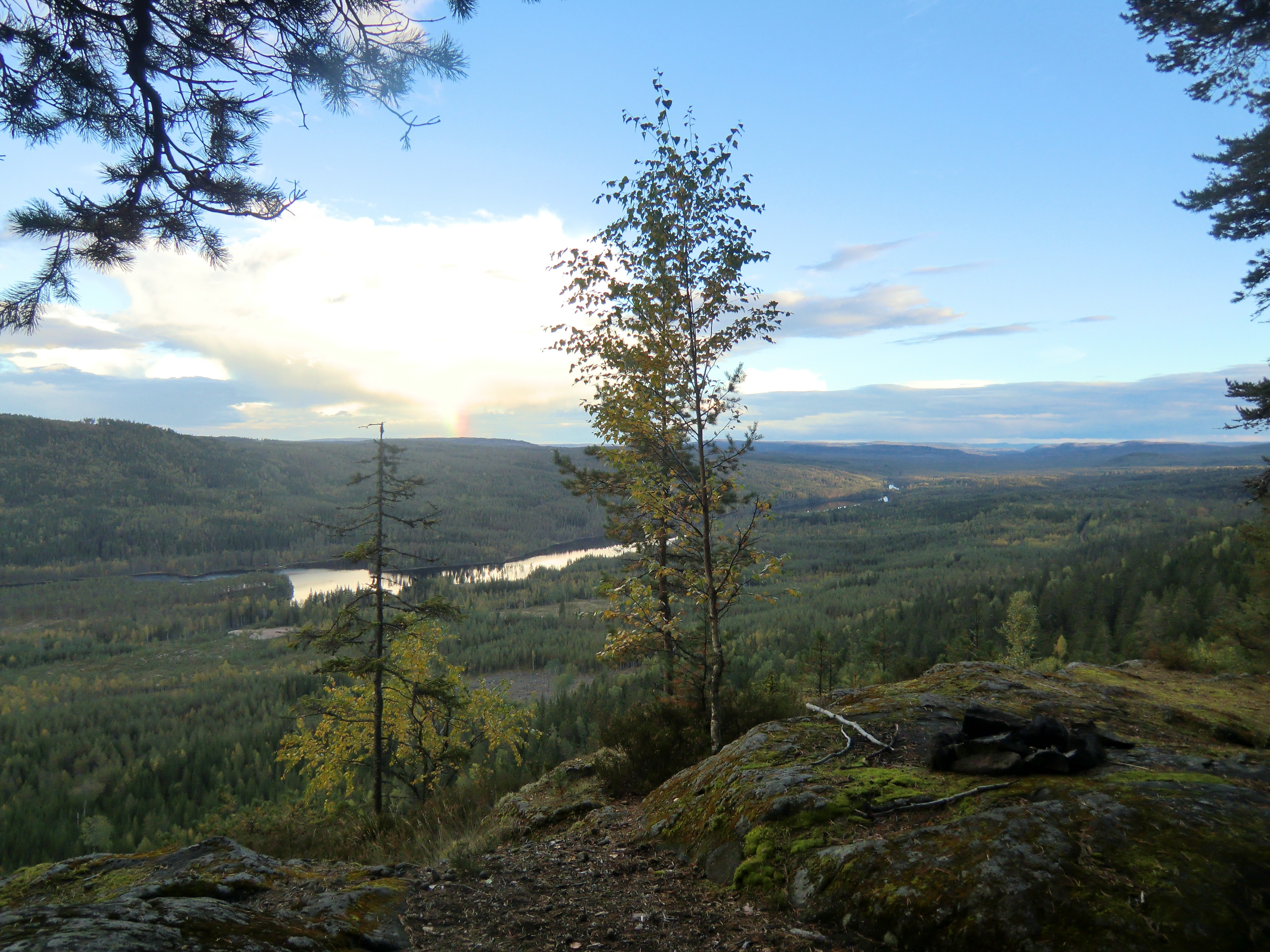
- View of the landscape in eastern Grue

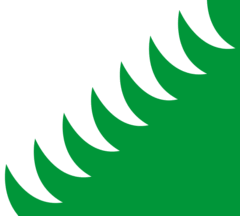
- Flag Coat of arms

- Innlandet within Norway

- Grue within Innlandet
- Coordinates: 60°27′23″N 12°03′30″E
- Country: Norway
- County: Innlandet
- District: Solør
- Established: 1 January 1838
  - Created as: Formannskapsdistrikt
- Administrative centre: Kirkenær

Government
  - Mayor (2019): Rune Grenberg (Ap)

Area
  - Total: 837.17 km^{2} (323.23 sq mi)
  - Land: 777.42 km^{2} (300.16 sq mi)
  - Water: 59.75 km^{2} (23.07 sq mi) 7.1%
  - Rank: #136 in Norway
- Highest elevation: 583.93 m (1,915.8 ft)

Population (2025)
  - Total: 4,513
  - Rank: #193 in Norway
  - Density: 5.4/km^{2} (14/sq mi)
  - Change (10 years): ▼ −8.4%
- Demonym: Grusokning

Official language
  - Norwegian form: Bokmål
- Time zone: UTC+01:00 (CET)
  - Summer (DST): UTC+02:00 (CEST)
- ISO 3166 code: NO-3417
- Website: Official website

Grue is a municipality in Innlandet county, Norway. It is located in the traditional district of Solør. The administrative centre of the municipality is the village of Kirkenær. Other villages in the municipality include Bergesida, Grinder, Namnå, Risberget, Rotberget, Skasenden, and Svullrya.

The 837-square-kilometre (323 sq mi) municipality is the 136th largest by area out of the 357 municipalities in Norway. Grue is the 193rd most populous municipality in Norway with a population of 4,513. The municipality's population density is 5.4 inhabitants per square kilometre (14/sq mi) and its population has decreased by 8.4% over the previous 10-year period.

== General information ==
The parish of Grue was established as a municipality on 1 January 1838 (see formannskapsdistrikt law). In 1867, the southern district of Grue Municipality (population: 3,946) was separated to become the new Brandval Municipality. This left Grue Municipality with 6,464 residents. In 1941, a small area of Grue Municipality (population: 68) was transferred to the neighboring Brandval Municipality. During the 1960s, there were many municipal mergers across Norway due to the work of the Schei Committee. On 1 January 1969, the Rotberget farm area (population: 23) was transferred from Åsnes Municipality to Grue Municipality. On 1 January 1974, an unpopulated part of the Lystad area was transferred from Grue Municipality to the neighboring Kongsvinger Municipality.

Historically, the municipality was part of the old Hedmark county. On 1 January 2020, the municipality became a part of the newly-formed Innlandet county (after Hedmark and Oppland counties were merged).

=== Name ===
The municipality (originally the parish) is named after the old Grue farm (Old Norse: Grǫf or Grǫfa) since the first Grue Church was built there. The name is identical with the word grǫf or grǫfa which means "depression" or "hollow".

=== Coat of arms ===
The coat of arms was granted on 30 October 1992. The official blazon is "Per bend sinister rayonny of wolf-teeth argent and vert" (Norwegian: Venstre skrådelt av sølv og grønt ved buet ulvetannsnitt). This means the arms have are divided with a diagonal line that is rayonny, meaning it looks like curved wolf teeth rather than a straight line. The field (background) below the line has a tincture of Vert (green). Above the line, the field has a tincture of argent which means it is commonly colored white, but if it is made out of metal, then silver is used. The flame-like line represents the clearance of farms in the woods by the use of fire and is also a remembrance of the gruesome church fire of 1822. The colors symbolize the forests and the Glomma river. The arms were designed by Harald Hallstensen. The municipal flag has the same design as the coat of arms.

=== Churches ===
The Church of Norway has two parishes (sokn) within Grue Municipality. It is part of the Solør, Vinger og Odal prosti (deanery) in the Diocese of Hamar.

Churches in Grue
Parish (sokn)	Church name	Location of the church	Year built
Grue	Grue Church	Kirkenær	1825
Grue Finnskog	Grue Finnskog Church	Svullrya	1886

== Geography ==
Number of minorities (1st and 2nd generation) in Grue by country of origin in 2017
Ancestry	Number
Sweden	50
Poland	32
Lithuania	29
Iraq	28
Croatia	28
Eritrea	25
(Bosnia and Herzegovina) Bosnia-Herzegovina	23

Grue Municipality is situated around the Glomma river and the geography is dominated largely by forests and some agricultural areas around Glomma. It is located in the southeast part of Innlandet county. It is bordered on the south by Kongsvinger Municipality, on the north by Åsnes Municipality, and on the west by Nord-Odal Municipality. To the east, it borders Sweden.

Grue Municipality was the early center for the Finnish migration which today populates the Finnskogen, a belt about 32 kilometres (20 mi) wide and running continuously along the Swedish border through Grue Municipality, Åsnes Municipality, and Våler Municipality. Their first population center in Norway was located around the lake of Røgden.

The rivers Løvhaugsåa and Rotna both run through the area. The lakes Hukusjøen, Skasen, and Gardsjøen are located in the municipality. The highest point in the municipality is the 583.93-metre (1,915.8 ft) tall mountain Kaketjennsberget, located in the north, near the border with Åsnes Municipality.

== Government ==
Grue Municipality is responsible for primary education (through 10th grade), outpatient health services, senior citizen services, welfare and other social services, zoning, economic development, and municipal roads and utilities. The municipality is governed by a municipal council of directly elected representatives. The mayor is indirectly elected by a vote of the municipal council. The municipality is under the jurisdiction of the Romerike og Glåmdal District Court and the Eidsivating Court of Appeal.

=== Municipal council ===
The municipal council (Kommunestyre) of Grue Municipality is made up of 19 representatives that are elected to four year terms. The tables below show the current and historical composition of the council by political party.

Grue kommunestyre 2023–2027
Party name (in Norwegian)	Number of representatives
Labour Party (Arbeiderpartiet)	10
Progress Party (Fremskrittspartiet)	2
Conservative Party (Høyre)	3
Pensioners' Party (Pensjonistpartiet)	1
Centre Party (Senterpartiet)	3
Total number of members:	19

Grue kommunestyre 2019–2023
Party name (in Norwegian)	Number of representatives
Labour Party (Arbeiderpartiet)	8
Progress Party (Fremskrittspartiet)	1
Conservative Party (Høyre)	3
Centre Party (Senterpartiet)	6
Grue local list (Grue Bygdeliste)	1
Total number of members:	19

Grue kommunestyre 2015–2019
Party name (in Norwegian)	Number of representatives
Labour Party (Arbeiderpartiet)	8
Centre Party (Senterpartiet)	3
Joint list of the Conservative Party (Høyre), Christian Democratic Party (Kristelig Folkeparti), and Liberal Party (Venstre)	8
Total number of members:	19

Grue kommunestyre 2011–2015
Party name (in Norwegian)	Number of representatives
Labour Party (Arbeiderpartiet)	9
Centre Party (Senterpartiet)	3
Joint list of the Conservative Party (Høyre), Christian Democratic Party (Kristelig Folkeparti), and Liberal Party (Venstre)	7
Total number of members:	19

Grue kommunestyre 2007–2011
Party name (in Norwegian)	Number of representatives
Labour Party (Arbeiderpartiet)	9
Progress Party (Fremskrittspartiet)	2
Socialist Left Party (Sosialistisk Venstreparti)	1
Joint list of the Conservative Party (Høyre), Christian Democratic Party (Kristelig Folkeparti), Centre Party (Senterpartiet), and Liberal Party (Venstre)	7
Total number of members:	19

Grue kommunestyre 2003–2007
Party name (in Norwegian)	Number of representatives
Labour Party (Arbeiderpartiet)	7
Progress Party (Fremskrittspartiet)	1
Socialist Left Party (Sosialistisk Venstreparti)	2
Joint list of the Conservative Party (Høyre), Christian Democratic Party (Kristelig Folkeparti), Centre Party (Senterpartiet), and Liberal Party (Venstre)	9
Total number of members:	19

Grue kommunestyre 1999–2003
Party name (in Norwegian)	Number of representatives
Labour Party (Arbeiderpartiet)	8
Socialist Left Party (Sosialistisk Venstreparti)	1
Joint list of the Conservative Party (Høyre), Christian Democratic Party (Kristelig Folkeparti), Centre Party (Senterpartiet), and Liberal Party (Venstre)	10
Total number of members:	19

Grue kommunestyre 1995–1999
Party name (in Norwegian)	Number of representatives
Labour Party (Arbeiderpartiet)	14
Conservative Party (Høyre)	3
Centre Party (Senterpartiet)	6
Socialist Left Party (Sosialistisk Venstreparti)	1
Liberal Party (Venstre)	1
Total number of members:	25

Grue kommunestyre 1991–1995
Party name (in Norwegian)	Number of representatives
Labour Party (Arbeiderpartiet)	14
Conservative Party (Høyre)	3
Centre Party (Senterpartiet)	5
Socialist Left Party (Sosialistisk Venstreparti)	3
Total number of members:	25

Grue kommunestyre 1987–1991
Party name (in Norwegian)	Number of representatives
Labour Party (Arbeiderpartiet)	17
Conservative Party (Høyre)	3
Centre Party (Senterpartiet)	3
Socialist Left Party (Sosialistisk Venstreparti)	1
Liberal Party (Venstre)	1
Total number of members:	25

Grue kommunestyre 1983–1987
Party name (in Norwegian)	Number of representatives
Labour Party (Arbeiderpartiet)	18
Conservative Party (Høyre)	3
Centre Party (Senterpartiet)	3
Socialist Left Party (Sosialistisk Venstreparti)	1
Total number of members:	25

Grue kommunestyre 1979–1983
Party name (in Norwegian)	Number of representatives
Labour Party (Arbeiderpartiet)	16
Conservative Party (Høyre)	3
Christian Democratic Party (Kristelig Folkeparti)	1
Centre Party (Senterpartiet)	3
Socialist Left Party (Sosialistisk Venstreparti)	1
Liberal Party (Venstre)	1
Total number of members:	25

Grue kommunestyre 1975–1979
Party name (in Norwegian)	Number of representatives
Labour Party (Arbeiderpartiet)	16
Conservative Party (Høyre)	2
Christian Democratic Party (Kristelig Folkeparti)	1
Centre Party (Senterpartiet)	4
Socialist Left Party (Sosialistisk Venstreparti)	2
Total number of members:	25

Grue kommunestyre 1971–1975
Party name (in Norwegian)	Number of representatives
Labour Party (Arbeiderpartiet)	18
Conservative Party (Høyre)	1
Centre Party (Senterpartiet)	5
Socialist People's Party (Sosialistisk Folkeparti)	1
Total number of members:	25

Grue kommunestyre 1967–1971
Party name (in Norwegian)	Number of representatives
Labour Party (Arbeiderpartiet)	18
Conservative Party (Høyre)	1
Centre Party (Senterpartiet)	4
Socialist People's Party (Sosialistisk Folkeparti)	2
Total number of members:	25

Grue kommunestyre 1963–1967
Party name (in Norwegian)	Number of representatives
Labour Party (Arbeiderpartiet)	17
Conservative Party (Høyre)	2
Communist Party (Kommunistiske Parti)	1
Centre Party (Senterpartiet)	4
Local List(s) (Lokale lister)	1
Total number of members:	25

Grue herredsstyre 1959–1963
Party name (in Norwegian)	Number of representatives
Labour Party (Arbeiderpartiet)	17
Conservative Party (Høyre)	2
Communist Party (Kommunistiske Parti)	2
Centre Party (Senterpartiet)	4
Total number of members:	25

Grue herredsstyre 1955–1959
Party name (in Norwegian)	Number of representatives
Labour Party (Arbeiderpartiet)	17
Conservative Party (Høyre)	2
Communist Party (Kommunistiske Parti)	2
Christian Democratic Party (Kristelig Folkeparti)	1
Farmers' Party (Bondepartiet)	3
Total number of members:	25

Grue herredsstyre 1951–1955
Party name (in Norwegian)	Number of representatives
Labour Party (Arbeiderpartiet)	16
Conservative Party (Høyre)	2
Communist Party (Kommunistiske Parti)	3
Farmers' Party (Bondepartiet)	3
Total number of members:	24

Grue herredsstyre 1947–1951
Party name (in Norwegian)	Number of representatives
Labour Party (Arbeiderpartiet)	15
Conservative Party (Høyre)	1
Communist Party (Kommunistiske Parti)	4
Christian Democratic Party (Kristelig Folkeparti)	1
Farmers' Party (Bondepartiet)	3
Total number of members:	24

Grue herredsstyre 1945–1947
Party name (in Norwegian)	Number of representatives
Labour Party (Arbeiderpartiet)	14
Communist Party (Kommunistiske Parti)	4
Christian Democratic Party (Kristelig Folkeparti)	2
Joint List(s) of Non-Socialist Parties (Borgerlige Felleslister)	4
Total number of members:	24

Grue herredsstyre 1937–1941*
Party name (in Norwegian)	Number of representatives
Labour Party (Arbeiderpartiet)	15
Conservative Party (Høyre)	2
Communist Party (Kommunistiske Parti)	1
Farmers' Party (Bondepartiet)	4
Liberal Party (Venstre)	2
Total number of members:	24
Note: Due to the German occupation of Norway during World War II, no elections were held for new municipal councils until after the war ended in 1945.

=== Mayors ===
The mayor (Norwegian: ordfører) of Grue Municipality is the political leader of the municipality and the chairperson of the municipal council. Here is a list of people who have held this position:

- 1838–1845: Ole Arntzen Lützow
- 1846–1847: Jørgen Cappelen Omsted
- 1848–1857: Nicolai Astrup
- 1858–1859: Gunder Gundersen
- 1860–1863: Jacob Rolsdorph Andersen
- 1864–1879: Ole Bredesen Opset
- 1880–1883: Arne A. Omsted
- 1883–1887: Ole Bredesen Opset
- 1888–1898: Arne A. Omsted
- 1899–1907: Amund Bredesen Opset
- 1908–1913: Wilhelm Omsted
- 1914–1919: Amund Bredesen Opset
- 1920–1925: Magnus Vangerud
- 1926–1928: Sigurd Woll
- 1929–1931: Ole H. Sæther
- 1932–1933: Arve Myrvang
- 1933–1934: Arne Tveter
- 1935–1935: Ole Kamphaug
- 1936–1940: Eivind Grimstad
- 1940–1945: Vacant due to WWII
- 1945–1945: Martin Møllerud
- 1946–1955: Magnus Vangerud
- 1956–1963: Reidar Mellem
- 1964–1964: Martin Råberget
- 1964–1978: Thor Henriksen
- 1979–1985: Torbjøn Øveråsen
- 1985–1999: Ragnar Nyman
- 1999–2007: Niels Ferdinand Rolsdorph
- 2007–2011: Herdis Bragelien
- 2011–2015: Niels Ferdinand Rolsdorph
- 2015–2019: Wenche Huser Sund
- 2019–present: Rune Grenberg (Ap)

== Economy ==
A privately owned lamp factory with 51 employees is located in Grue. As of June 2024, it was announced that in less than a year the production will be moved to Poland, an EU country.

== Notable people ==
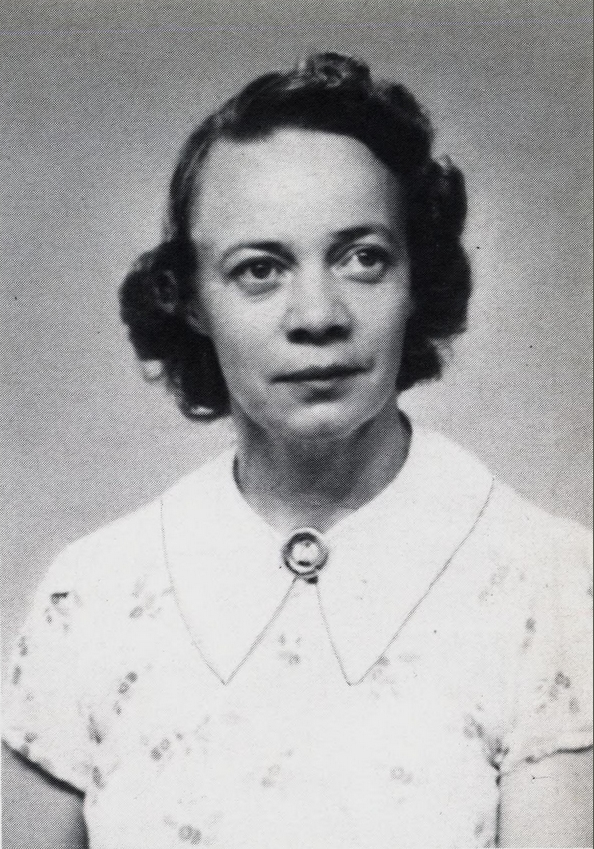
Åsta Holth, 1945

- Andreas Aagaard Kiønig (1771–1856), a lawyer and representative at the Norwegian Constitutional Assembly
- Andreas Arntzen (1777–1837), a politician, police chief, Supreme Court judge, & timber merchant
- Mor Sæther (1793–1851), a Norwegian "klok kone" ("cunning woman"), i.e. a herbalist
- Ole Peter Riis Høegh (1806–1852), a trained civilian architect and Bergen's first town surveyor
- Wilhelm Maribo Schøyen (1844–1918), Norway's first government entomologist
- Olav Strøm (1866-1963), a pioneer trade unionist
- Kristian Prestrud (1881–1927), a naval officer and member of Amundsen's South Pole expedition
- Hagbart Haakonsen (1895-1984), a cross-country skier who competed at the 1928 Winter Olympics
- Åsta Holth (1904–1999), a novelist, poet and short story writer
- Kåre Jonsborg (1912–1977), a painter and textile artist
- Sinikka Langeland (born 1961), a traditional folk singer and kantele player
- Tom Harald Hagen (born 1978), a football UEFA referee

== Gallery ==
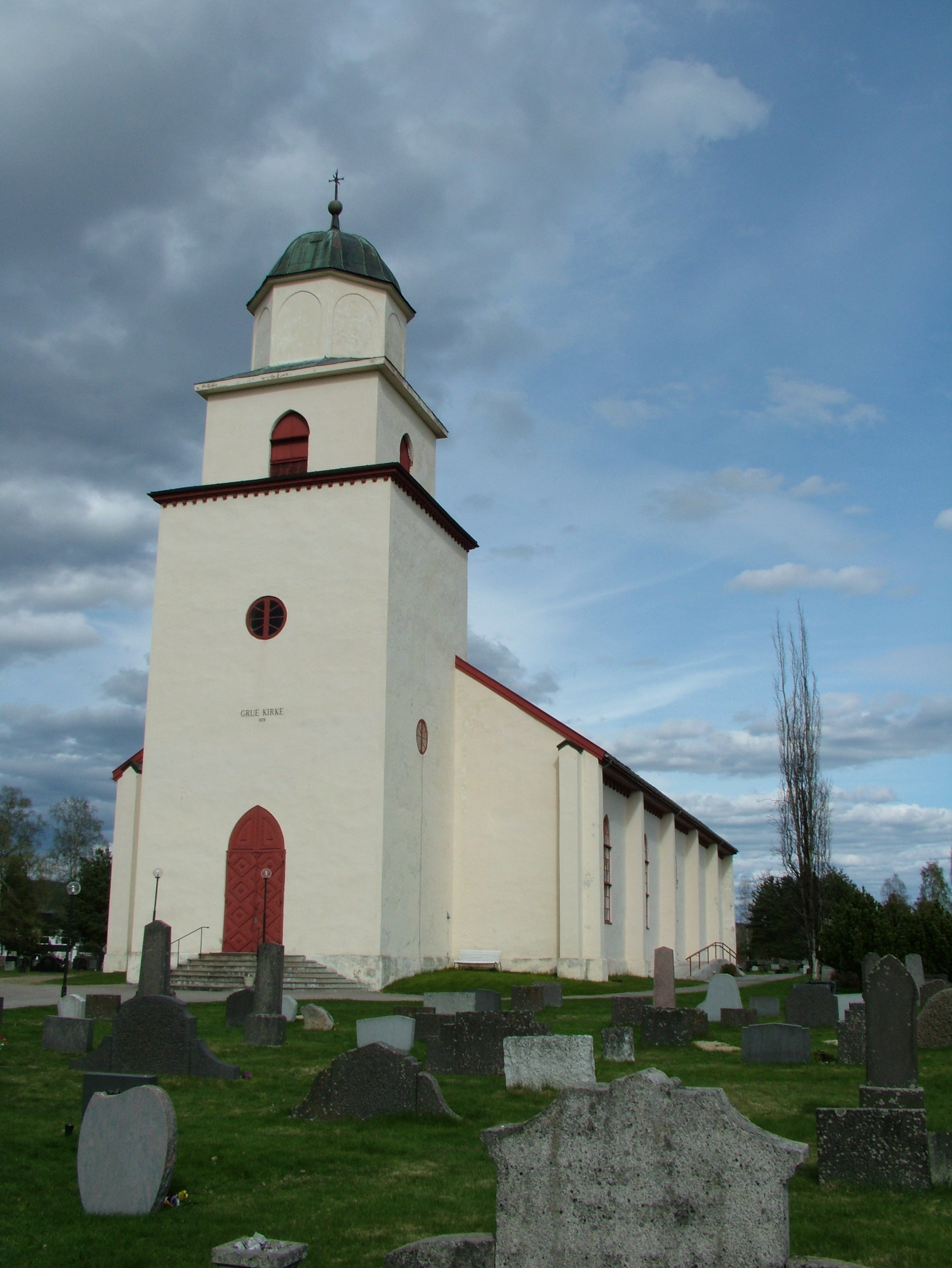
Grue Church

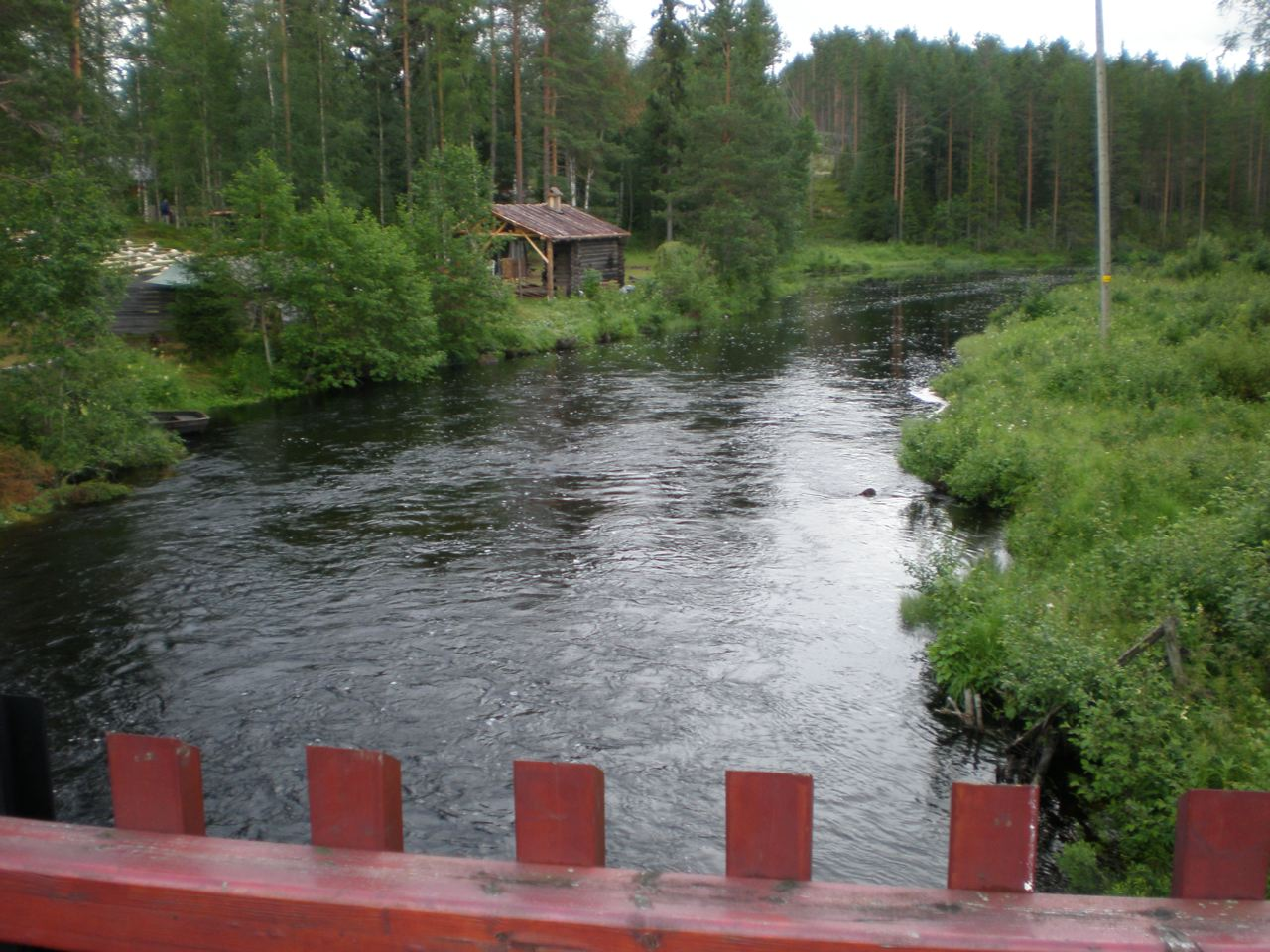
River Rottnan in Svullrya

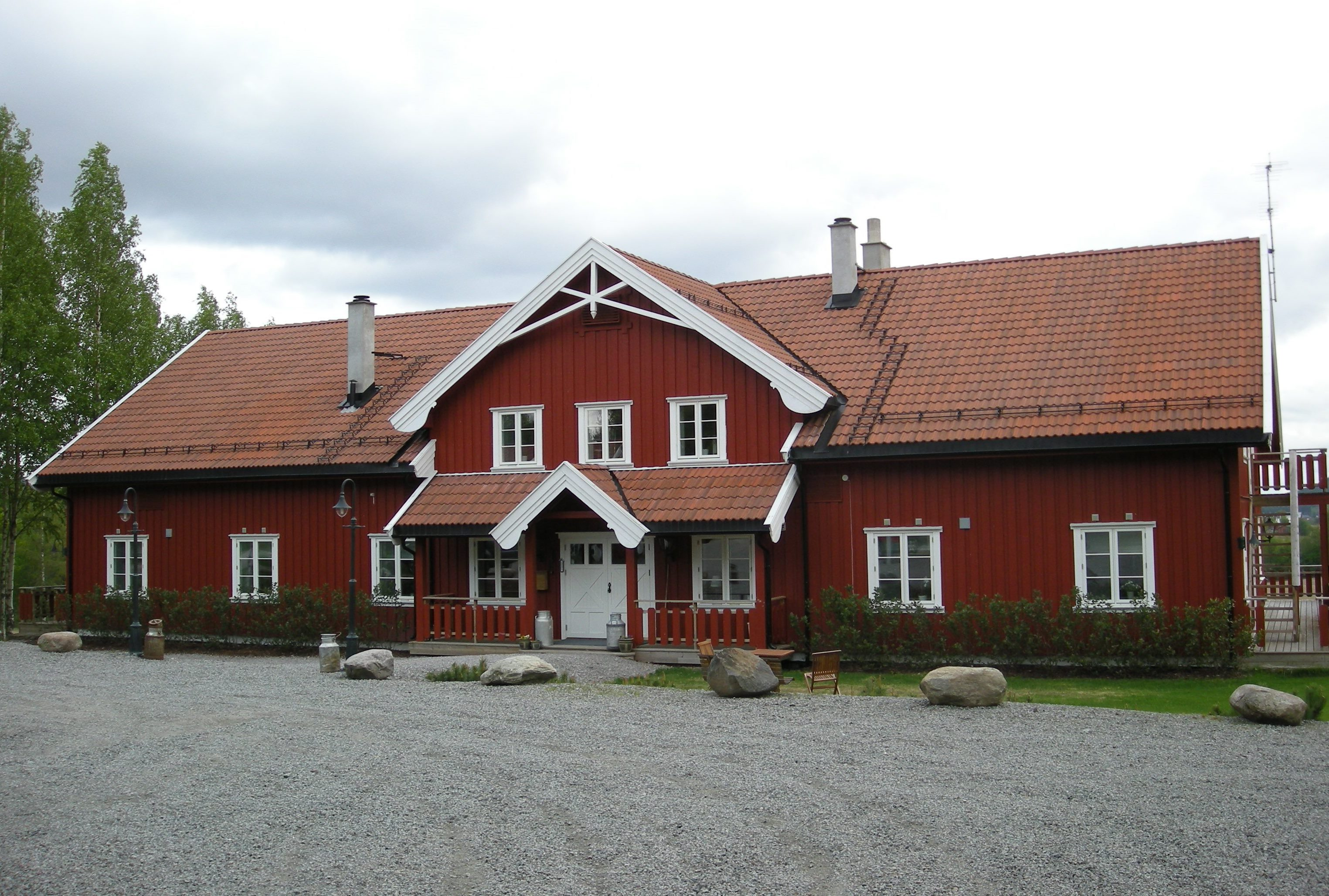
Opaker Grue

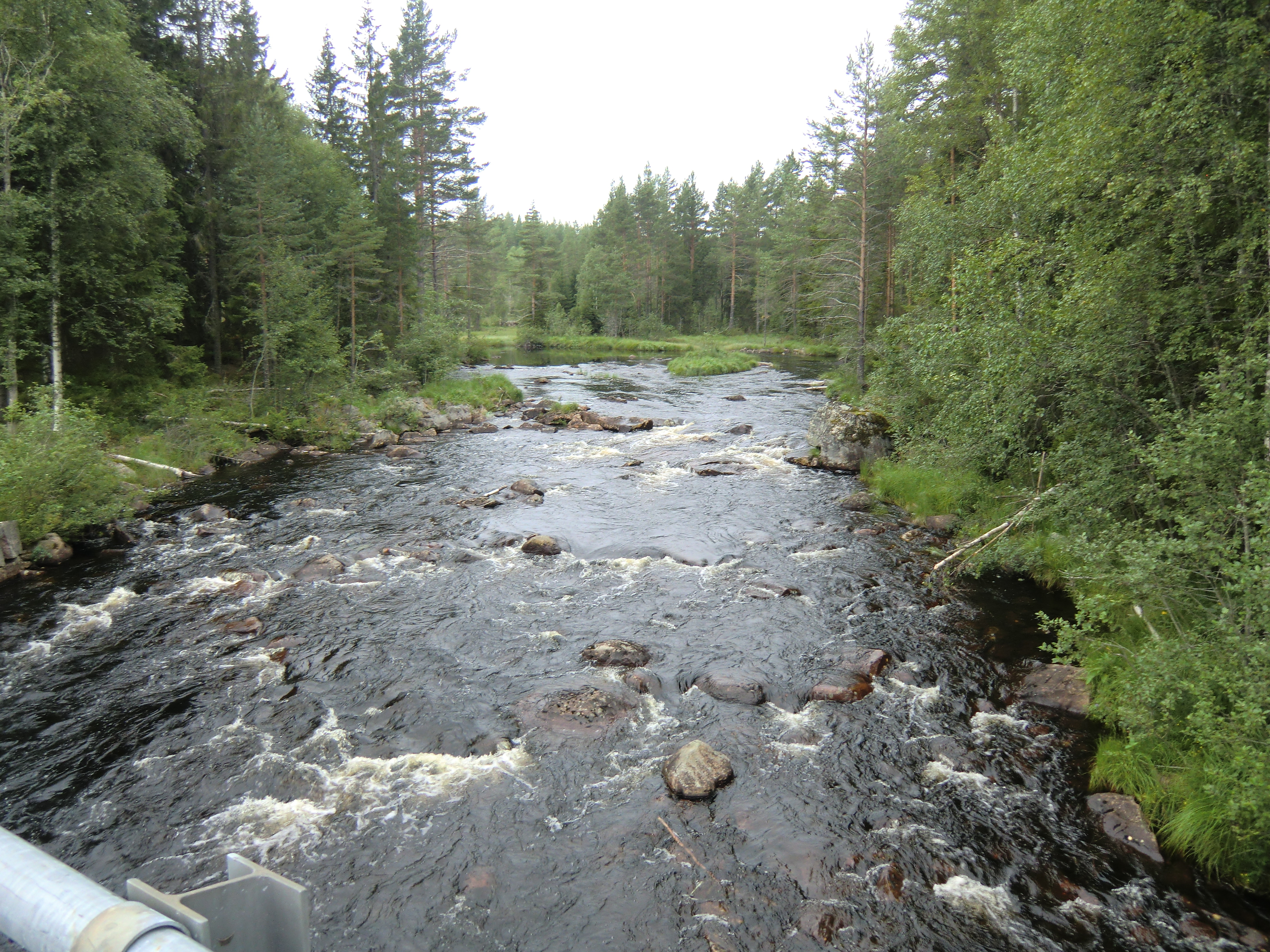
Løvhaugsåa river
