= Grue Church =

Church in Innlandet, Norway

- Grue kirke
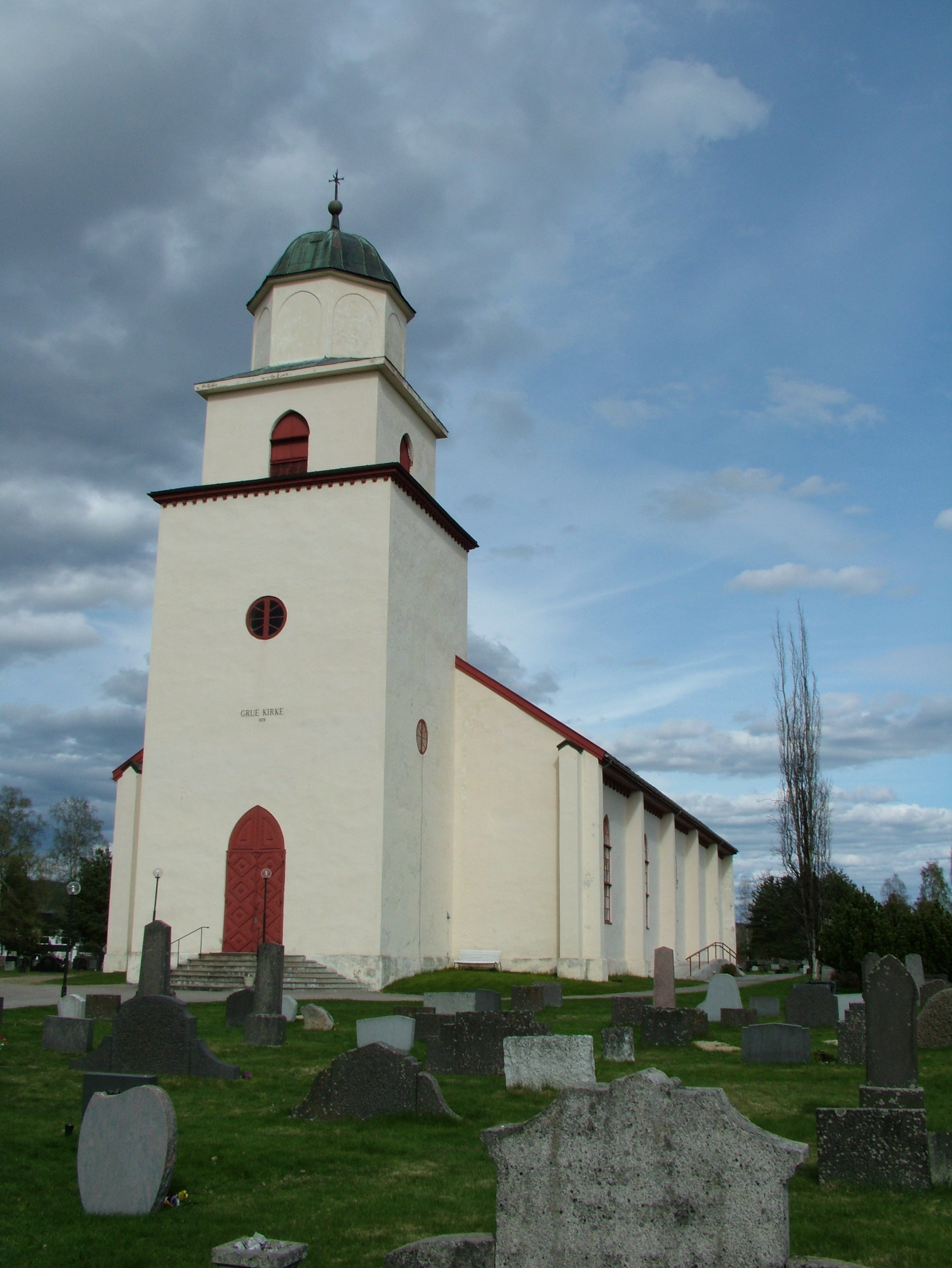
- View of the church
- Grue Church
- 60°26′57″N 12°03′10″E
- Location: Grue Municipality, Innlandet
- Country: Norway
- Denomination: Church of Norway
- Previous denomination: Catholic Church
- Churchmanship: Evangelical Lutheran

History
- Status: Parish church
- Founded: 12th century
- Consecrated: 28 September 1828

Architecture
- Functional status: Active
- Architect: Hans Linstow
- Architectural type: Long church
- Completed: 1828 (198 years ago)

Specifications
- Capacity: 500
- Materials: Stone

Administration
- Diocese: Hamar bispedømme
- Deanery: Solør, Vinger og Odal prosti
- Parish: Grue
- Norwegian Cultural Heritage Site
- Type: Church
- Status: Automatically protected
- ID: 84434

Grue Church (Norwegian: Grue kirke) is a parish church of the Church of Norway in Grue Municipality in Innlandet county, Norway. It is located in the village of Kirkenær. It is the church for the Grue parish which is part of the Solør, Vinger og Odal prosti (deanery) in the Diocese of Hamar. The white, stone church was built in a long church design in 1828 using plans drawn up by the architect Hans Linstow. The church seats about 500 people.

The church was moved from its original site to a new site after the Grue Church fire. The original site of the medieval Grue Church has been lost to the river Glomma which has changed course over the centuries and now flows over the site of the church.

== History ==
The earliest existing historical records of the church date back to the year 1224, but that was not the year of construction. The first church in Grue was a wooden stave church that was likely built during the 12th century. This church stood roughly 2.5 kilometres (1.6 mi) to the north of the present church site, but the exact site of the old church is not known. Very little is known about the original look of this building. During the Catholic era, the church was dedicated to John the Baptist. In 1609 (the year on the wind vane in the spire), the church was renovated and enlarged. It is likely that this is the time when two transept wings were added that gave the church a cruciform floor plan. It is likely that the church was rebuilt and renovated in stages so that by the 1700s, very little of the original church building remained.

The church, like most other churches in Norway, was sold during the Norwegian church auction in 1723 to help the King pay off war debts. It (together with Brandval Church) was bought by Captain Adolph Carl Helm and Colbjørn Olsen Stemsrud. The new owners sold the church to the local people the same year. The church was said to be in very poor condition at this time, and in the purchase agreement, the church was required to be repaired soon after the purchase. The local villagers began the repairs in 1727. More interior work was also carried out in 1732. In 1739, the church was inspected and the inspection report described the church in detail. At that time, it was a cruciform church. The church had a tower above the centre of the nave. There was a bell tower over the church porch on the west cross-arm and a sacristy outside the northern cross-arm. The church had exterior open-air corridors along the west and south sides of the building. The nine windows were all located high up on the wall and had small, leaded panes with iron bars.

Even after the repairs, the church remained in poor condition. The old church stood just north of the Grue rectory, along the shores of the river Glomma. Over time, it was threatened by erosion from the river, which carried away large amounts of soil near the church every year, moving the shoreline closer and closer to the building. In 1774, the church and rectory were almost destroyed during a flood from the river. On 17 May 1794, the parish received permission for the church to be relocated to Vollermoen and for a new stone church to be built there. The church, however, was not moved at that time. It could be speculated that there may have been issues with finances or land or the design of the new building, but for whatever reason, the old church remained, and since it was planned to be torn down, the church was not maintained and it continued to fall into disrepair.

In 1814, this church served as an election church (Norwegian: valgkirke). Together with more than 300 other parish churches across Norway, it was a polling station for elections to the 1814 Norwegian Constituent Assembly which wrote the Constitution of Norway. This was Norway's first national elections. Each church parish was a constituency that elected people called "electors" who later met together in each county to elect the representatives for the assembly that was to meet at Eidsvoll Manor later that year.

In 1817, the Bishop visited the church and agreed that the church site needed to be moved due to the river (and at this point, the church was in terrible condition from a lack of maintenance). On 26 May 1822 (Pentecost Sunday), the church burned in what is now known as the Grue Church fire, in which at least 113 people died. The fire was possibly the result of sparks from an old incense burner that was used to collect embers for the altar candles.

After the fire, the old church site was cleared and a new church was built about 2.5 kilometres (1.6 mi) to the south. The new building was constructed out of stone and can accommodate 500 people. It has massive dimensions; it measures 47 by 18 metres (154 ft × 59 ft) and the walls are 1.26 metres (4 ft 2 in) thick. The church has a very simple outer form, composed of a tower and a nave with basic geometric shapes. The plans for the church were largely the work of the architect Hans Linstow who was assisted by Ole Peter Riis Høegh, and it was the first Gothic Revival structure in Norway. The tower on the west end does not have a tradition spire, but rather, it has a dome on top. Work on the new church began in 1825, but the work stalled for a couple of years due to funding problems. By April 1828, the church building was completed and work began on the interior decorations and furniture. The church was consecrated on 28 September 1828 by Bishop Christian Sørenssen.

In 1864, the church was renovated to correct some weaknesses in the structure as well as to improve the heating system. The entire roof structure was also changed during this project. In 1873-1875, the interior of the church was redone, in particular, a new altarpiece and pulpit were installed.

During the 1870s, many families from the Grue Church parish in Norway, left and emigrated to the United States. Many of these people formed at least two new congregations - both of which were named to honor their home church back in Norway. The "Grue Norwegian Evangelical Lutheran Church" was built in rural Buxton, North Dakota and "Grue Lutheran Church" was built in rural Ashby, Minnesota.

== Media gallery ==
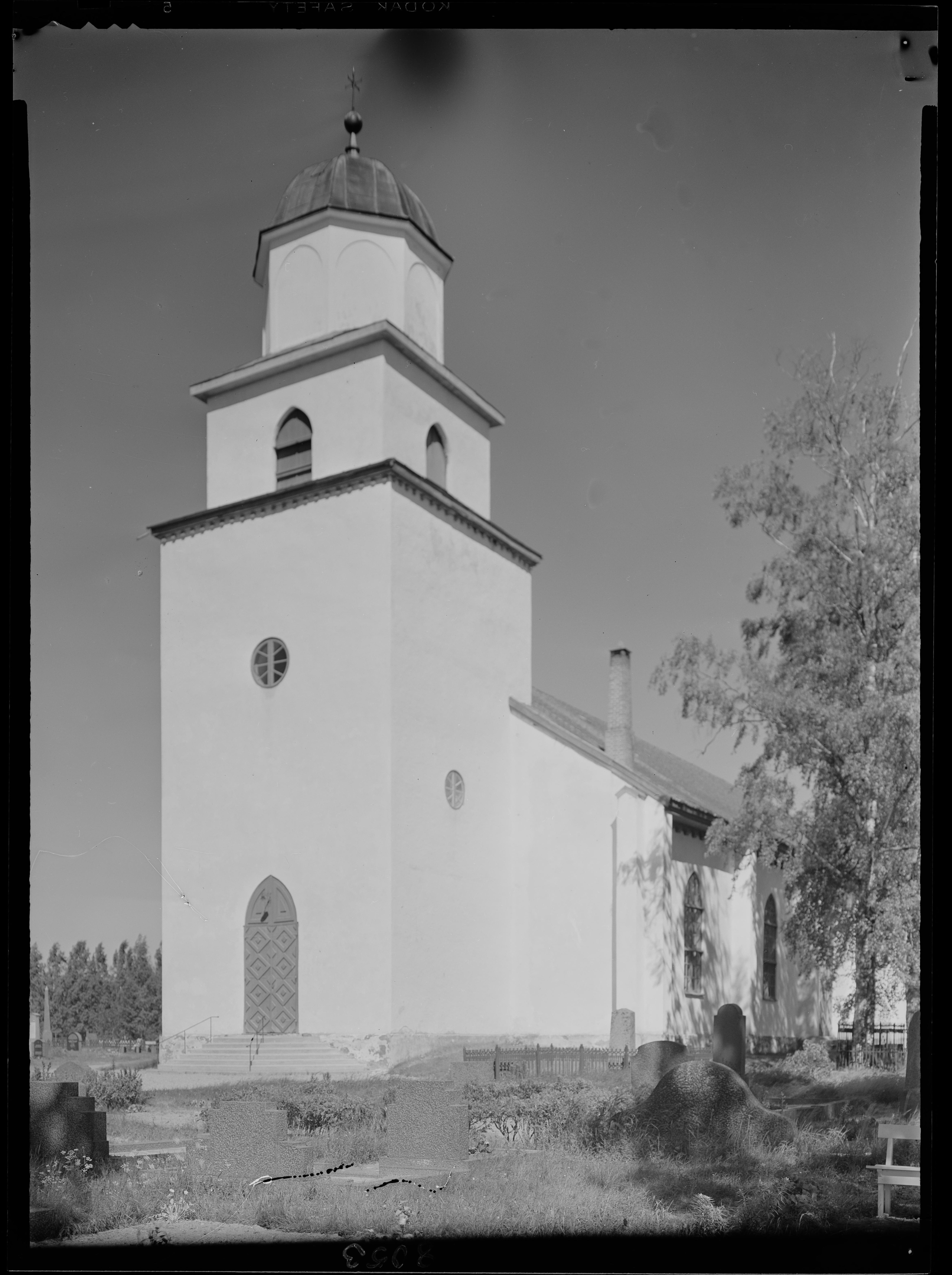

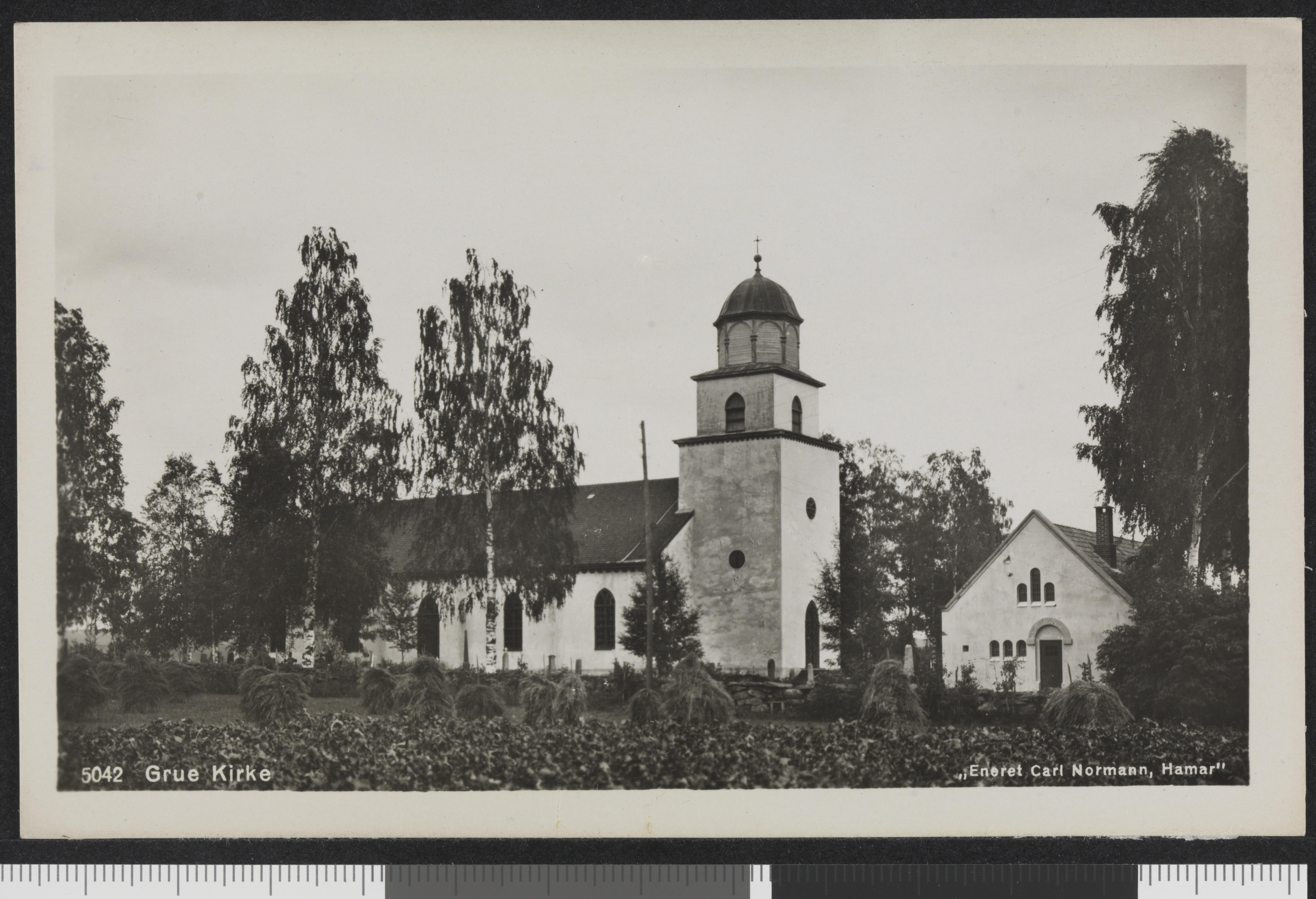

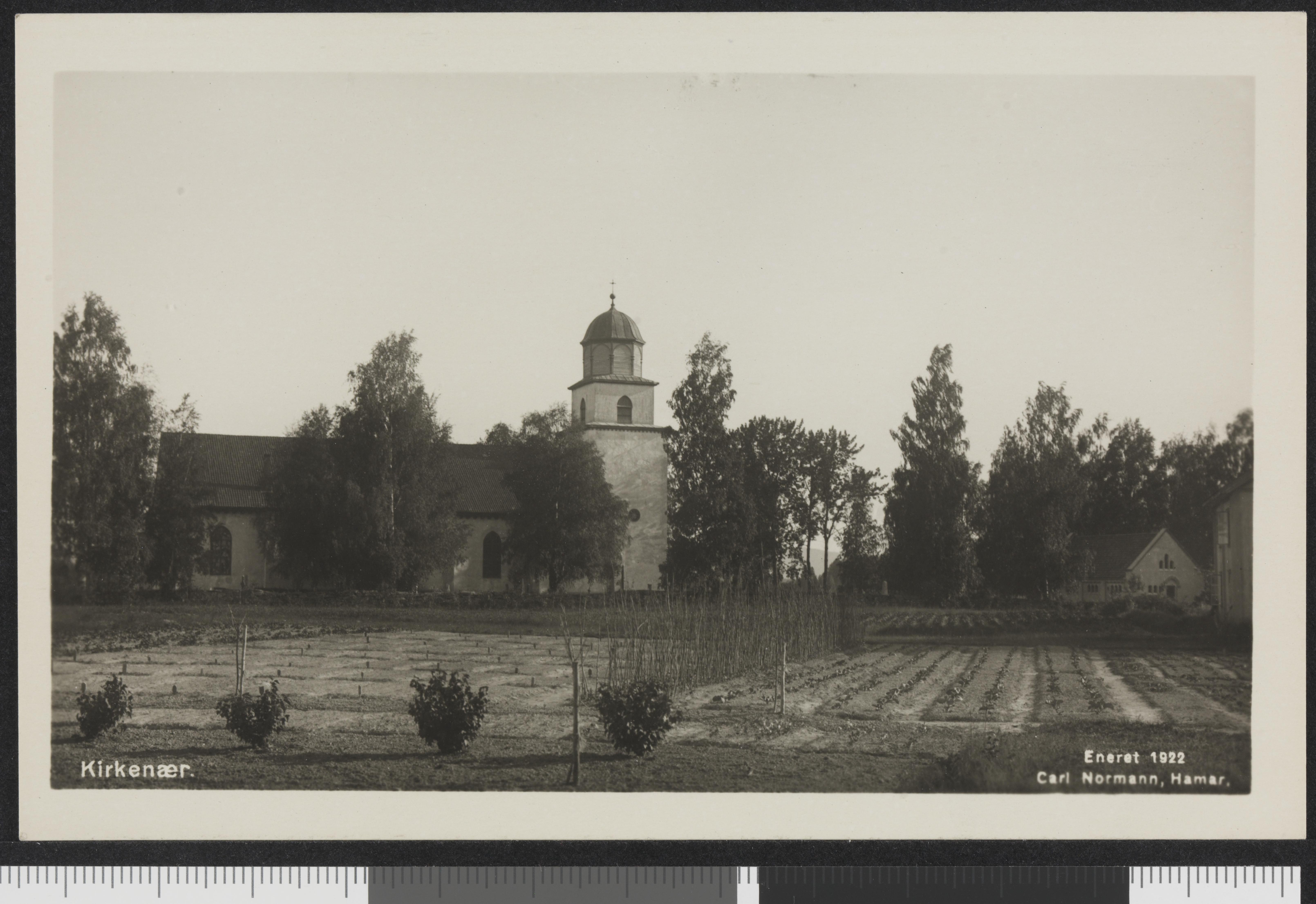

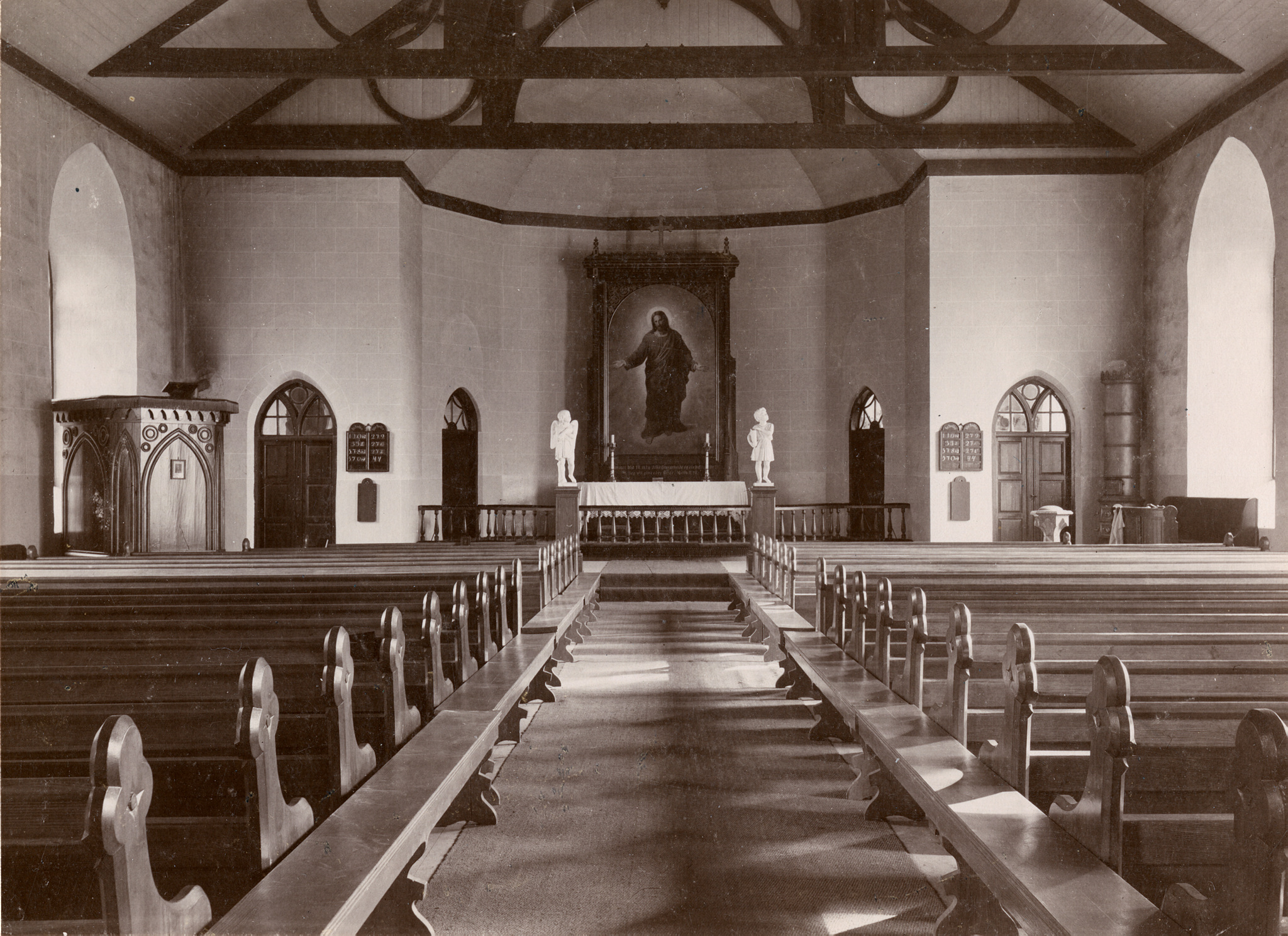

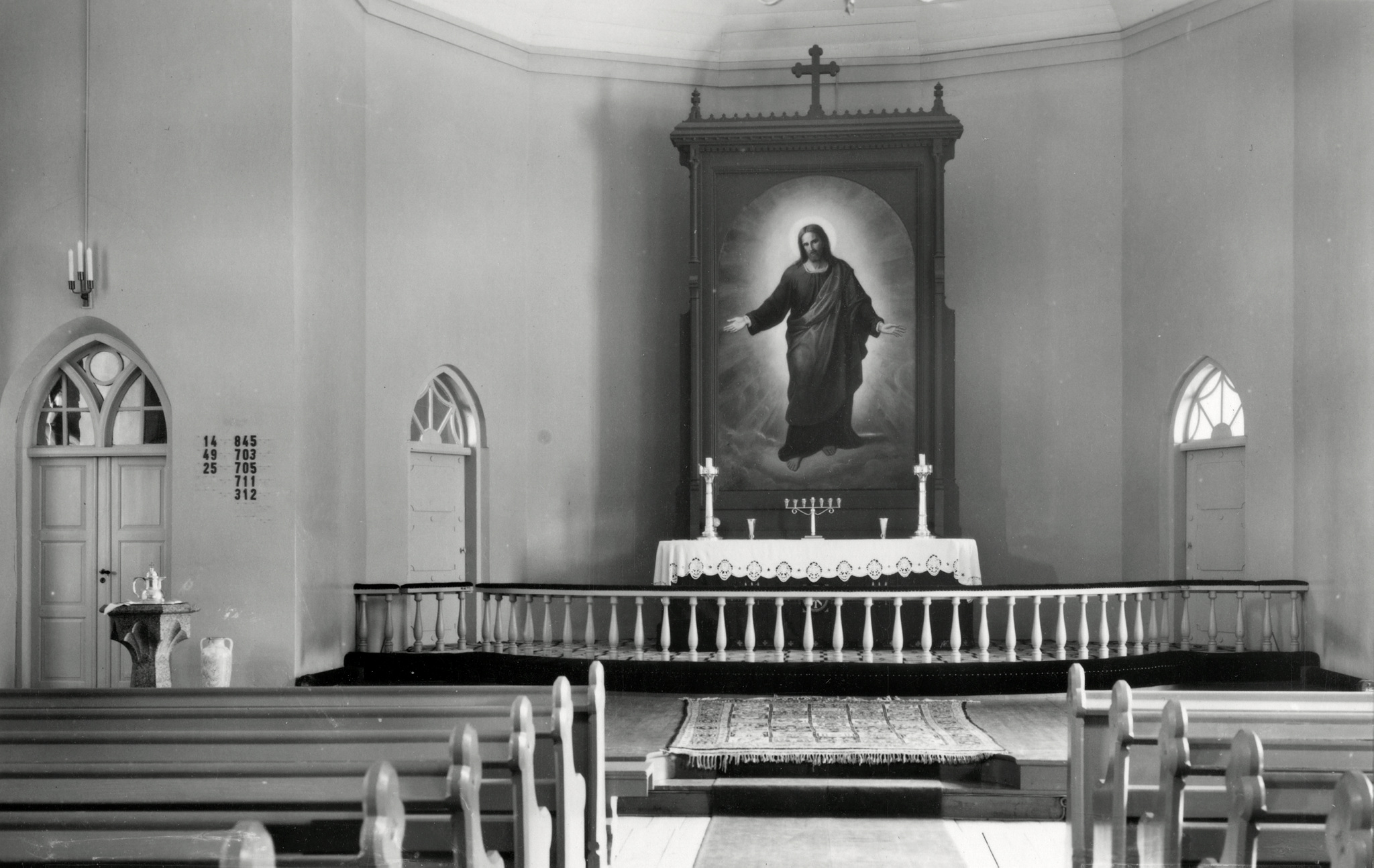

== See also ==
- Grue Church fire
- List of churches in Hamar
