= Gardsjøen (Grue) =

Lake in Grue, Norway

- Interactive map of the lake
- Location: Grue Municipality, Innlandet
- Coordinates: 60°26′0″N 12°5′16″E
- Primary inflows: Tjuraåa river
- Primary outflows: Glomma river
- Basin countries: Norway
- Max. length: 3 kilometres (1.9 mi)
- Max. width: 200 metres (660 ft)
- Surface area: 71 hectares (180 acres)
- Shore length^{1}: 7.25 kilometres (4.50 mi)
- Surface elevation: 150 metres (490 ft)
- References: NVE
- ^{1} Shore length is not a well-defined measure.

Gardsjøen is a lake in Grue Municipality in Innlandet county, Norway. The 71-hectare (180-acre) lake is an oxbow lake that was formed by the river Glomma. Over time, this part of the river became separated from the river, forming a lake. The lake lies about 2 kilometres (1.2 mi) south of the village of Kirkenær.

== See also ==
- List of lakes in Norway
