= Andreas Aagaard Kiønig =

Norwegian lawyer and judge

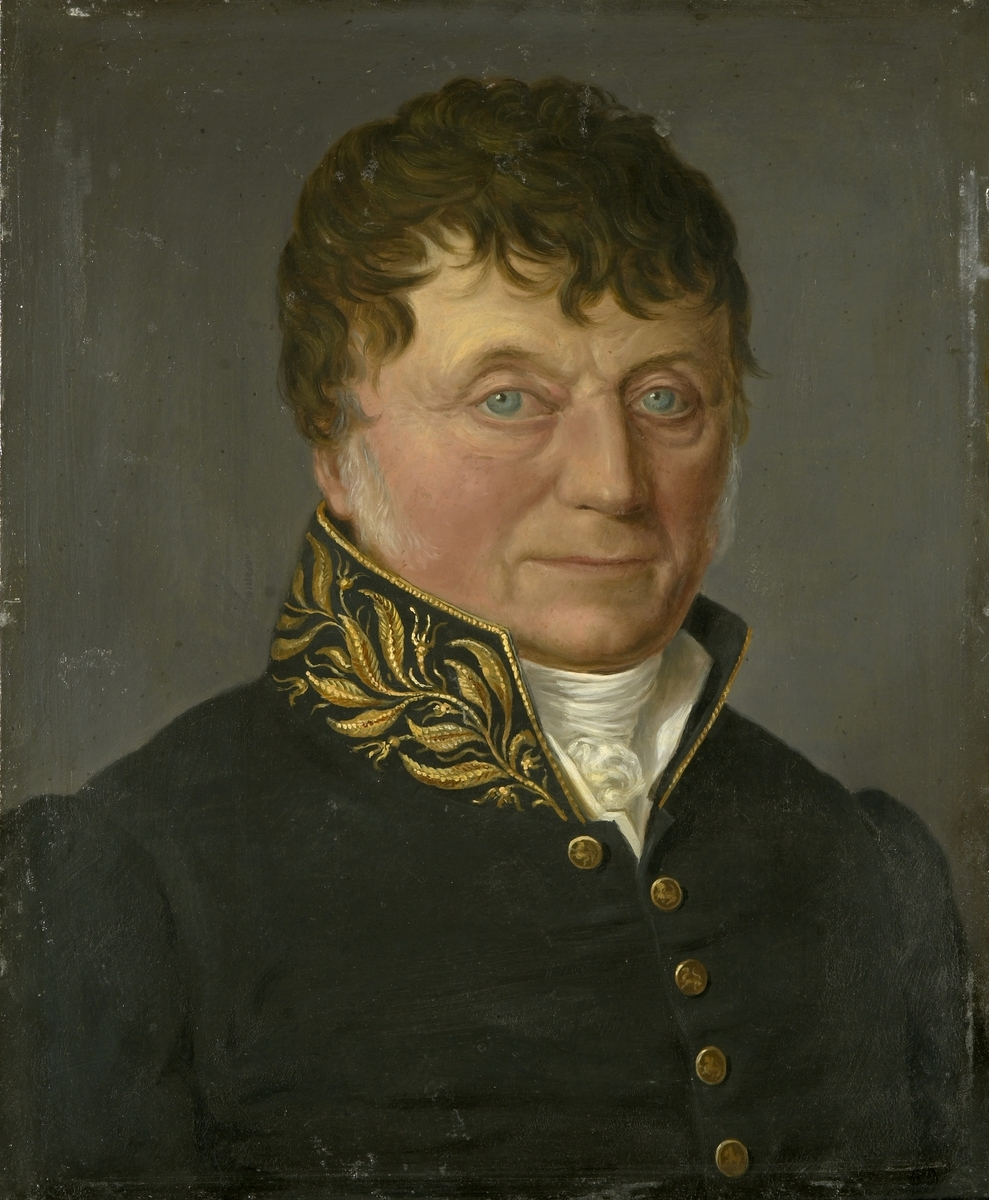
Painting of Andreas Aagaard Kiønig, by Jacob Munch

Andreas Aagaard Kiønig (8 August 1771 – 1 March 1856) was a Norwegian lawyer and judge. He served as a representative at the Norwegian Constitutional Assembly.

Andreas Aagaard Kiønig was born on Opaker Gård in the parish of Grue in Hedmark county, Norway. He graduated as cand.jur. in 1790. He then became a jurist in Denmark–Norway.

He was elected to the Norwegian Constituent Assembly in 1814, representing the constituency of Hedemarkens Amt. He supported the independence party (Selvstendighetspartiet). At that time he worked as a district stipendiary magistrate (sorenskriver) in the traditional district of Østerdalen.

He was then appointed a Supreme Court Assessor the same year. In 1836, when the appointment of a new Chief Justice was due, Kiønig was a candidate, but the position was given to Georg Jacob Bull. As a result, Kiønig retired as a Supreme Court Assessor. Kiønig was honorably discharged from civil service in 1837 and retired to Opsal søndre in the parish of Elverum in Hedmark.
