= Mor Sæther =

Norwegian herbalist; cunning woman (1793–1851)

Mor Sæther

Mor Sæther (born Anne Johansdatter Viker; 20 October 1793 in Grue, Norway – 25 April 1851 in Christiania (Oslo)), was a Norwegian "klok kone" ("cunning woman"), that is, a herbalist. She is one of the best known within her profession in Norway.

== Biography ==
Mor Sæther (lit. 'Mother Sæther') was born in a rural area of Grue (present-day Kongsvinger Municipality) in Hedmark county. Her parents were the farmer Johan Eriksen Viker (b. 1757) and Bastine Guttormsdatter (b. 1768); they had 7 children. She married twice: first to a Mr. Sæther who appears to have worked as a handyman at the Anatomy School at Royal Frederick University (now Oslo University), and then in 1825 to a farmer, Lars Bastian Nielsen (1797–1861). At the anatomy school she was given lessons in anatomy by Dr. Jens Essendrop Knoph; he lent her books in return for menial work. Her second husband owned a farm in Pipervika with 20 cows. There is a story that Mor Sæther took butter to the King, Carl Johan, when he was in Oslo.

Mor Sæther was active in Christiania (Oslo) in about 1820–1851. She was several times tried for quackery under the kvakksalverloven (lit. 'the quack medicines law') of 1794, and was sentenced to a diet of bread and water in prison in 1836, 1841, and 1844. On the last occasion, there was a popular outcry, supported by the nobleman Severin Løvenskiold, and she appealed to the supreme court (Høyesterett), which freed her. She was given official permission to practice medicine and was thereby made an officially licensed "cunning woman".

Mor Sæther was praised by Henrik Ibsen. He had been a tenant in her house for a short time in 1850.

Mor Sæther was the object of a poem, Mulig Forvexling ("Possible Confusion"), by Henrik Wergeland, whom she famously nursed at his death bed. The poem contains the couplet

Min Maane er gamle Mor Sæther (My moon is old Mother Saether)
i hennes snehvite Skaut. (in her snow white veil.)
