= Kirkenær =

Village in Grue Municipality, Norway

- Village
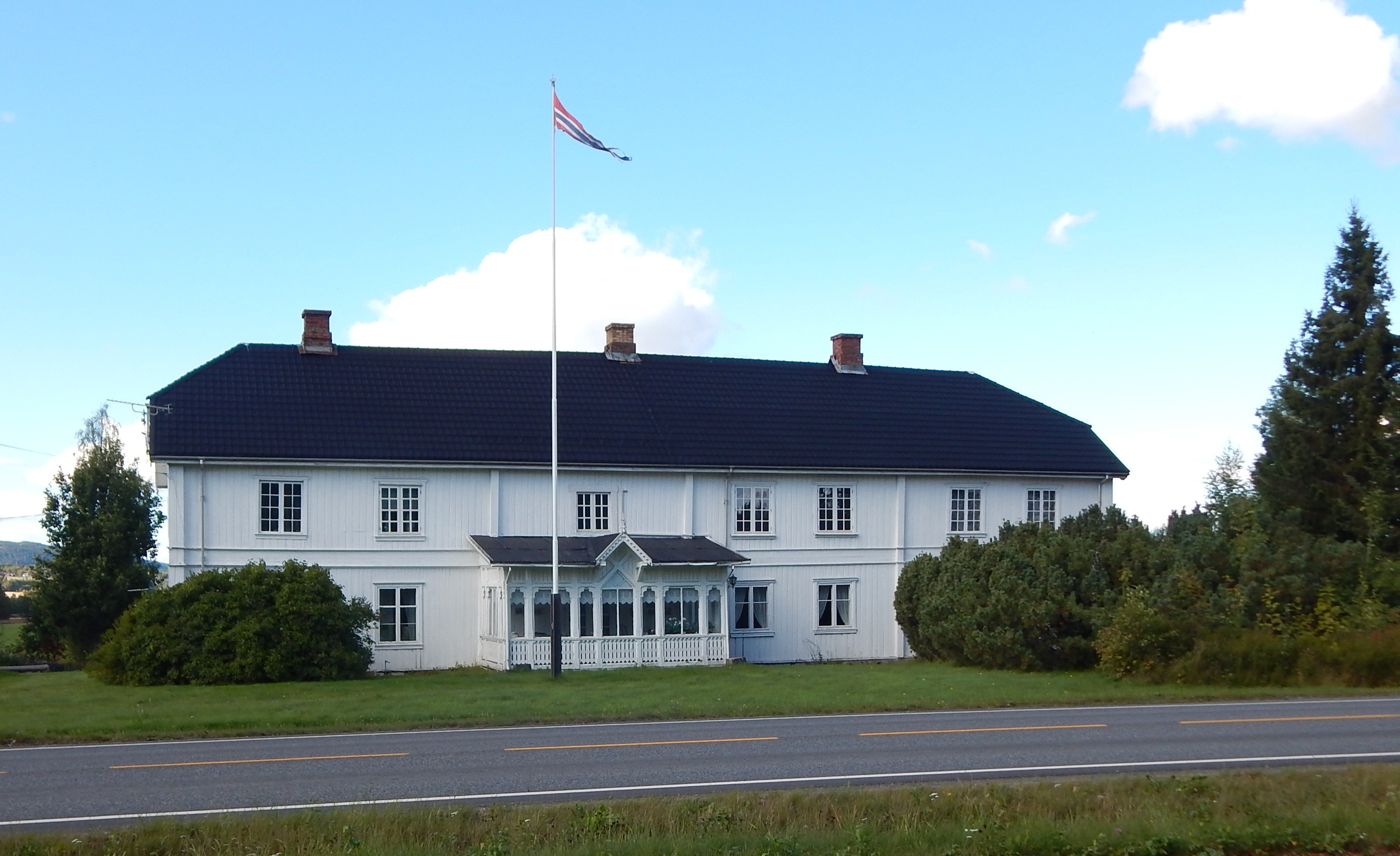
- View of the farmhouse on the Kirkenær farm which gave its name to the village
- Interactive map of Kirkenær
- Location within Innlandet Location within Norway
- Coordinates: 60.4579°N 12.05855°E
- Country: Norway
- Region: Eastern Norway
- County: Innlandet
- District: Solør
- Municipality: Grue Municipality

Area
  - Total: 1.99 km^{2} (0.77 sq mi)
- Elevation: 153 m (502 ft)

Population (2024)
  - Total: 1,225
  - Density: 616/km^{2} (1,600/sq mi)
- Time zone: UTC+01:00 (CET)
  - Summer (DST): UTC+02:00 (CEST)
- Post Code: 2260 Kirkenær

Kirkenær is the administrative centre of Grue Municipality in Innlandet county, Norway. The village is located on the eastern shore of the river Glomma. The village of Namnå lies about 4 kilometres (2.5 mi) to the north and the village of Grinder about 5.5 kilometres (3.4 mi) to the south.

Grue Church is located on the south side of the village. The Norwegian National Road 2 and the Solørbanen railway line both run through the village.

The 1.99-square-kilometre (490-acre) village has a population (2024) of 1,225 and a population density of 616 inhabitants per square kilometre (1,600/sq mi).

== History ==
The place is named after the Kirkenær farm and is located in the middle of Solør.

In 1822, the Grue Church fire occurred at Grue Church which was at the time located a little to the northwest of Kirkenær. At least 113 people perished in the fire, in addition to the destruction of the church. Afterwards, the church was rebuilt about 2.5 kilometres (1.6 mi) to the south, closer to the village.

When the Solørbanen railway was completed to Kirkenær in 1893, the village rapidly grew around the railway station.

== Media gallery ==
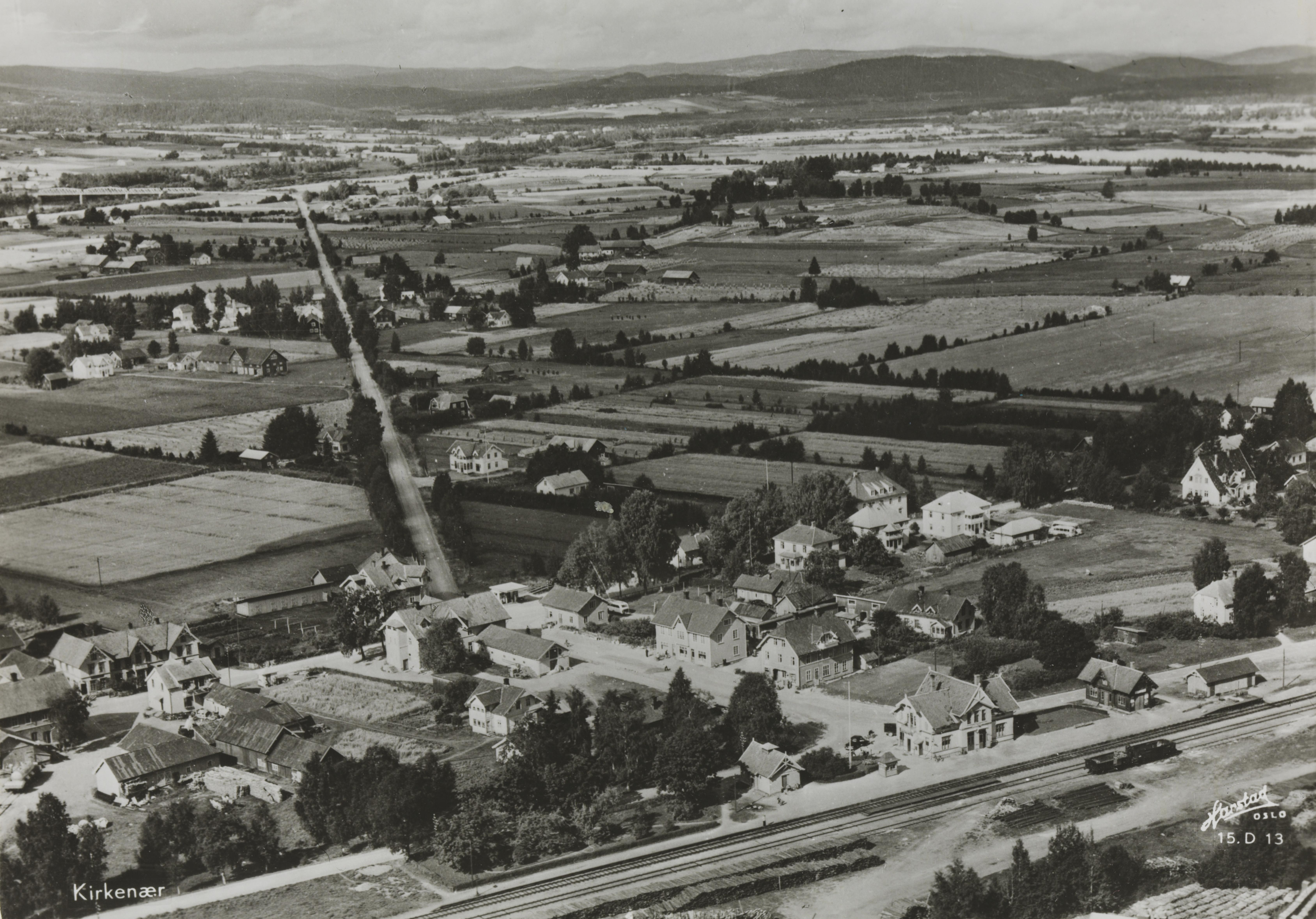

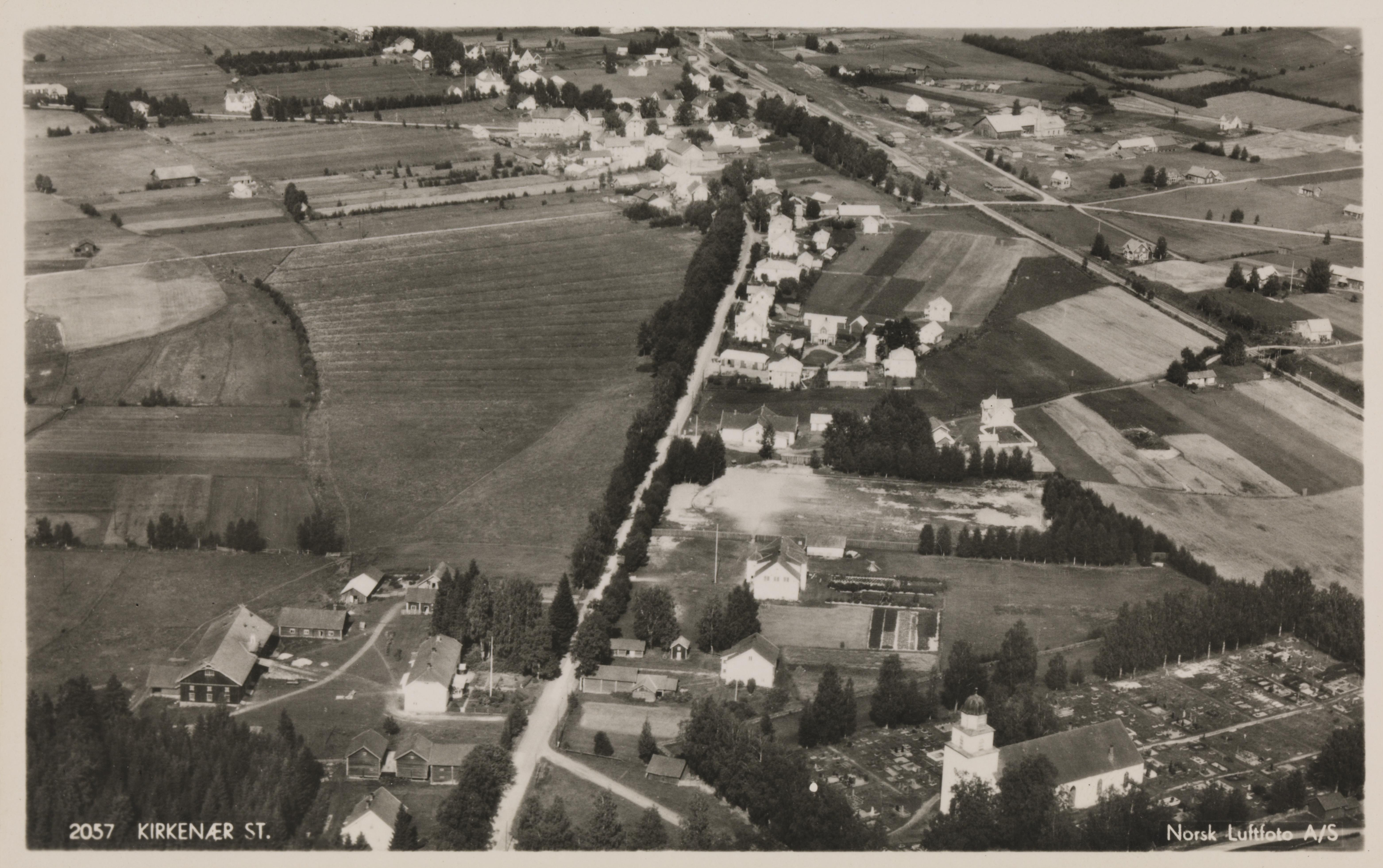

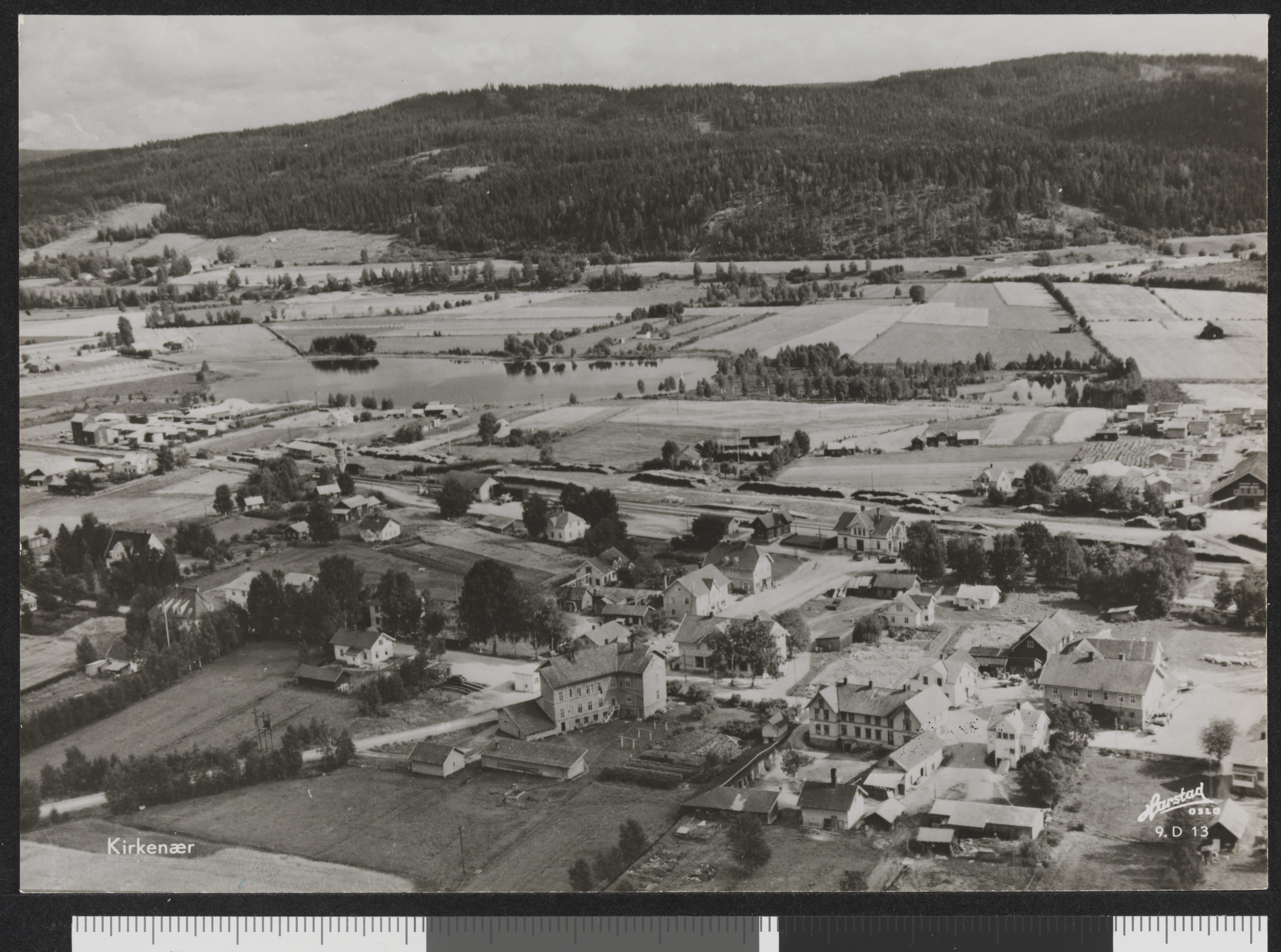
