= Finnskogen =

Region in Norway and Sweden

- Forested area
- Grue Municipality in Innlandet county, Eastern Norway is the center of the revived Skogfinn minority culture.
- Interactive map of Finnskogen
- Coordinates: 60°40′N 12°25′E
- Country: Norway, Sweden
- Region: (Norway) Eastern Norway (Sweden) Svealand
- County: (Norway) Innlandet (Sweden) Värmland
- Time zone: UTC+01:00 (CET)
  - Summer (DST): UTC+02:00 (CEST)

Finnskogen (lit. 'Forest of the Finns') is a forest area of Norway and Sweden situated in the counties of Innlandet and Värmland respectively, so named because of immigration of Finnish people in the 17th century, the so-called Forest Finns (Norwegian: Skogfinner).

The core area of Finnskogen lies in the eastern part of a small region known as Solør, on the border with Sweden. It consists of a forested belt of land, about 32 km (20 mi) wide going through the present-day municipalities of Våler, Åsnes, Grue, and Kongsvinger. It is adjacent to the Swedish region with similar Finnish immigration, named Finnskogarna.

There are also similar forested areas with people of Finnish descent in other parts of eastern Norway, including:

- Søre Osen in Trysil Municipality
- Finnemarka in Drammen Municipality
- Nordmarka in Oslo Municipality
- Finnefjerdingen in Ringerike Municipality
- Finneskogen in Bærum Municipality
- Vestre Finnemarka in Lier Municipality and Modum Municipality

== History ==
Finns, or Finnish people, were encouraged to migrate from the Finnish part of the Kingdom of Sweden to Sweden proper, where they were initially well received by the Duke of Södermanland (who became King Karl IX (1604–1611). At the time, the kingdom of Sweden covered both Sweden and Finland, as we know them today. The migrants were settled on crown lands in Värmland and Dalsland to occupy the area immediately adjacent to the border with Denmark-Norway.

More were encouraged to come to Sweden during the reign of Gustavus Adolphus (1611–1632).

The local Swedish peasants did not appreciate the immigrants, who lived by slash-burn agriculture (svedjebruk), and tensions led to persecution. In 1636, a Swedish decree evicted all Finns who were not registered as taxpayers, which in practice amounted to an expulsion of most of the Finns. Most moved across the Norwegian border into Solør, forming a colony in Grue. With its center around the lakes Røgden in Grue and Nordre- and Søndre Øyersjøen in Brandval (present-day Kongsvinger Municipality), a compact, pure Finnish colony formed quite quickly in the forested area. This area remained isolated due to its distinctive slash-and-burn farming for over 250 years, without any significant intermarriage with the nearby Norwegian residents. The 1686 census indicates many there were born in Finland, but had been living in Sweden before eventually settling in Norway.

Their loyalties during the Hannibal War (1643–1645) were with Sweden and some were caught spying on Norwegian troops.

In 1709, the Danish-Norwegian general Hausmann so distrusted them that he ordered they all be evacuated from Solør. The bailiff declined to evict them on the basis that they were subsistence farmers and so poor they would have starved if moved from the land they customarily used.

During the second half of the 19th century, many changes came to the area. The slash-and-burn farming techniques ended in the 1850s. In 1870, a new modern road through the area made travel and commerce much easier. Many of the residents began moving to new areas and intermixing with the Norwegian population. By the 20th century, the blood had so intermingled that it was probably impossible to find inhabitants of pure Finnish descent in the Finnskogen. But in Grue, over a quarter of the place names are still in Finnish.
