= Eastern Norway =

Region of Norway

Eastern Norway Østlandet (Bokmål) Austlandet (Nynorsk)
- Region (landsdel)
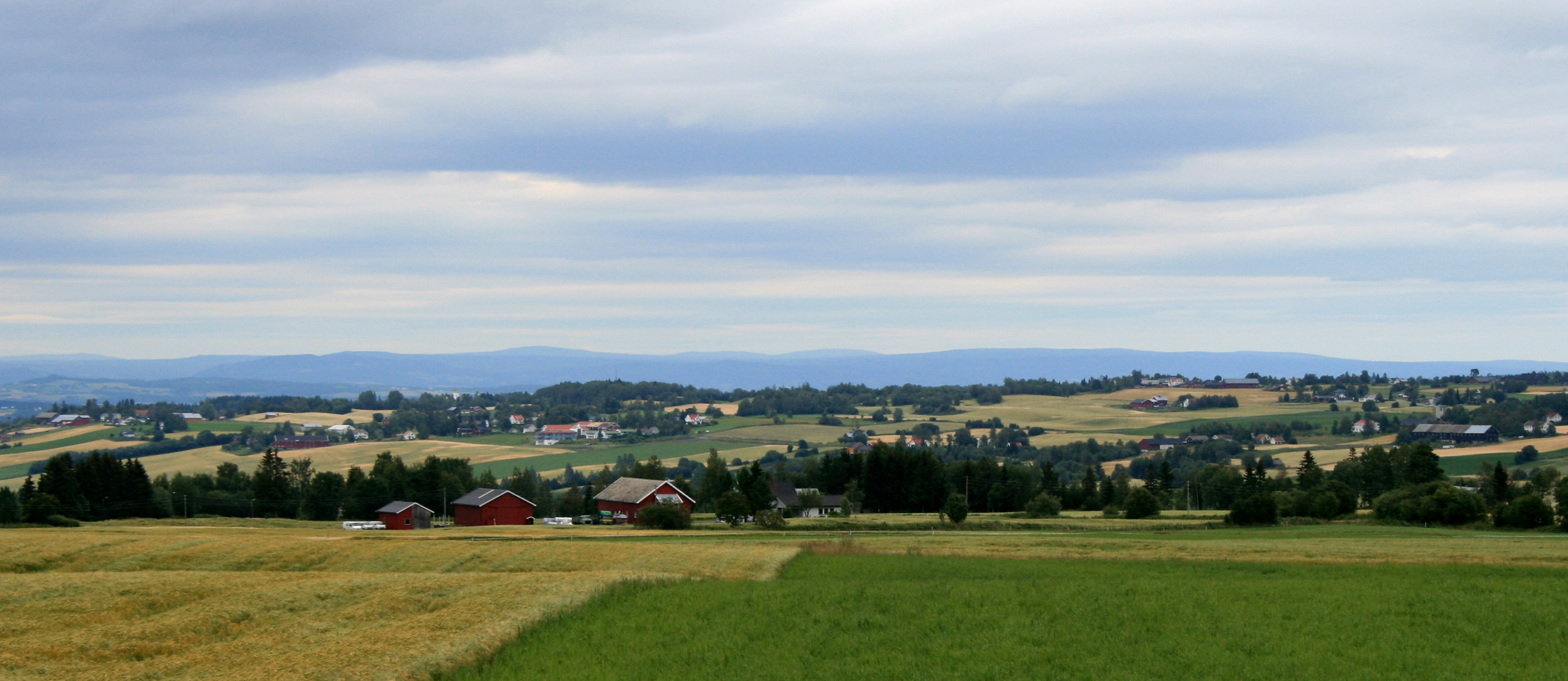
- Nickname: East-Norway
- Coordinates: 60°15′N 10°40′E
- Country: Norway
- County capitals: Drammen; Hamar; Oslo; Sarpsborg; Skien; Tønsberg
- Counties (fylker, fylke): Akershus; Buskerud; Innlandet; Oslo; Telemark; Vestfold; Østfold

Area
  - Total: 94,577 km^{2} (36,516 sq mi)

Population (2020)
  - Total: 2,700,000
  - Density: 29/km^{2} (74/sq mi)
- Demonym: Østlending
- Nominal GDP (2013): $0.17 trillion
- Nominal GDP per capita (2013): $70,000

Historical population
Year	Pop.	±% p.a.
1769	329,041	—
1951	1,584,045	+0.87%
1960	1,733,346	+1.01%
1970	1,895,148	+0.90%
1980	1,982,131	+0.45%
1990	2,064,971	+0.41%
2000	2,207,164	+0.67%
2010	2,430,512	+0.97%

Religion in Eastern Norway
religion	percent
Christianity	80.11%
Islam	3.25%
Buddhism	0.35%
Other	16.29%

Eastern Norway (Bokmål: Østlandet, Nynorsk: Austlandet) is the geographical region of the south-eastern part of Norway. It consists of the counties Oslo, Akershus, Vestfold, Østfold, Buskerud, Telemark, and Innlandet.

Eastern Norway is by far the most populous region of Norway. It contains the country's capital, Oslo, which is Norway's most populous city.

In Norwegian, the region is called Østlandet and Austlandet (lit. 'The east land') in contrast to Vestlandet (lit. 'The west land').

== Geography ==
As of 2015, the region had 2,593,085 inhabitants, 50.4% of Norway's population.

The region is bounded by mountains in the north and west, the Swedish border to the east, and by Østfold and Skagerrak to the south. The border towards Sørlandet is less obvious.

The mountains reach a height of 2469 metres in the Jotunheimen mountain range, the highest point in the Nordic countries (excluding Greenland). Other prominent mountain ranges include part of the Dovrefjell in the far north of the region, the Rondane north east of Lillehammer and others. The high plateau of Hardangervidda extends into Western Norway.

Valleys cut deep into the mountains. From east to west the main valleys are Østerdal, Gudbrandsdal, Valdres, Hallingdal, Numedal, and the many valleys of Telemark. Østerdalen is surrounded by mostly flat areas of conifer forests, but the others are all deeply cut into the mountains.

Most of eastern Norway's southern half is dominated by rolling hills with pine and spruce forests, and agricultural land down in the valleys.

The area around the Oslo fjord and towards the north east are comparatively flat, and there are patches of intensely cultivated lands, notably Hedmarken, Toten, Hadeland, Ringerike and others. The population density of the flatlands is the highest in the nation; some 40% of the nation's population lives within 200 km of Oslo. Numerous islands shelter the coasts, creating a paradise for swimmers and boaters in the summer.

== People, culture and folklore ==
The Norwegian dialects spoken in the southeast share a common intonation, but there is some variation in grammar, vocabulary and pronunciation. The dialects of the interior mountainous areas (Hedmark, Oppland, and interior parts of Buskerud and Telemark) are all distinct. The dialects of the coastal areas (Telemark, Vestfold, Akershus, southern Buskerud, Oslo and Østfold) are more similar to the written language (Bokmål); in fact, Urban East Norwegian can be said to be an unofficial standard pronunciation of Bokmål.

The eastern forests of Finnskogen and Finnemarka were the home of a Finnish population that immigrated to the area in the 17th century. Their language and culture was preserved into the 20th century, but now only folk tunes and food specialities remain. The southernmost group of Norway's Sami population is to be found in the north-eastern corner in Engerdal Municipality.

The culture of mountain valleys is preserved to a greater degree than the more urbanized metropolitan areas. The area is distinguished with traditional architecture, like stave churches and lafteverk, folk music and food. Some are concerned for the loss of local culture in the face of modernization. There are many tourist traps, which have a tendency of becoming Disneyland versions of the actual culture, especially in the ski resorts, which are transformed by people from the cities, with increased building of shops, hotels and vacation houses.

It is common to see moose warning signs missing from their posts, because many tourists take them home as a souvenir. This act is illegal and can result in a fine.

The coastal region is densely populated both by Norwegian and European standards. This region was industrialized early. Traditionally the biggest export was timber and shipping; now, employment in the industrial sector is in decline and most people are working in service-oriented companies. The coastal area is varied, from the metropolitan Oslo to the more quiet and idyllic old maritime city of Drøbak, and the oldest city in Norway, Tønsberg.

There are also some museum railway lines—for example, the Krøder Line, where one can ride heritage steam and diesel trains on old twisty railway tracks.

Oslo, the capital of Norway, has attracted people from all over Norway. Most of the country's immigrants settle in the region as well. In addition to numerous Christian churches, there are many mosques, Hindu shrines, Sikh temples, and Buddhist temples, giving Oslo a cosmopolitan feel.
