= Solør =

Traditional district in Norway

Coordinates: 60°23′32″N 11°54′02″E

Solør is a Norwegian traditional district consisting of the valley between Elverum in the north and Kongsvinger in the south. It is part of Innlandet county and it includes Våler Municipality, Åsnes Municipality, and Grue Municipality.

== Glomma valley ==
Glommadal (Glåmdalen) is a designation for the valley formed by the river Glåma (also called the Glomma), which is the longest and largest river in Norway. From Lake Aursunden in the north and south to Elverum, the valley is called the Østerdalen. From that point south until Kongsvinger, it is referred to as Solør. As the river turns westerly from Kongsvinger to Nes, the valley is called Odalen. These designations are also traditional districts, reflecting the designations locals used for their valleys.

== Name ==
The Old Norse form of the name was Soløyjar.

== Geography ==
Solør is a rural area and consists mainly of farming land and forest. In fact, Solør is the number one potato producing area in Norway. Forestry is also important for the area, and "Forestia", a major chip-board factory, is situated in Våler, playing an important role in the local society, especially by providing jobs for a large proportion of the local inhabitants.

== History ==
In the early Viking Age, before Harald Fairhair, Solør was a petty kingdom. In the 17th century the forest east of Glomma became known as Finnskogen (lit. 'the forest of the Finns'). This named refers to Finnish refugees from Sweden who had been encouraged to settle in the adjacent province of Värmland but were later evicted and fled across the border into Hedmark.

Halfdan Hvitbeinn was one of the historic Kings of Soløyjar (Solør).
