= Brandval =

Brandval may refer to:

== Places ==
- Brandval (village), a village in Kongsvinger Municipality in Innlandet county, Norway
- Brandval Municipality, a former municipality in the old Hedmark county, Norway
- Brandval Church, a church in Kongsvinger Municipality in Innlandet county, Norway

== Other ==
- Brandval Station, a railway station located along the Solørbanen railway line in Kongsvinger Municipality in Innlandet county, Norway
