= Roverud =

Village in Kongsvinger Municipality, Norway

- Village
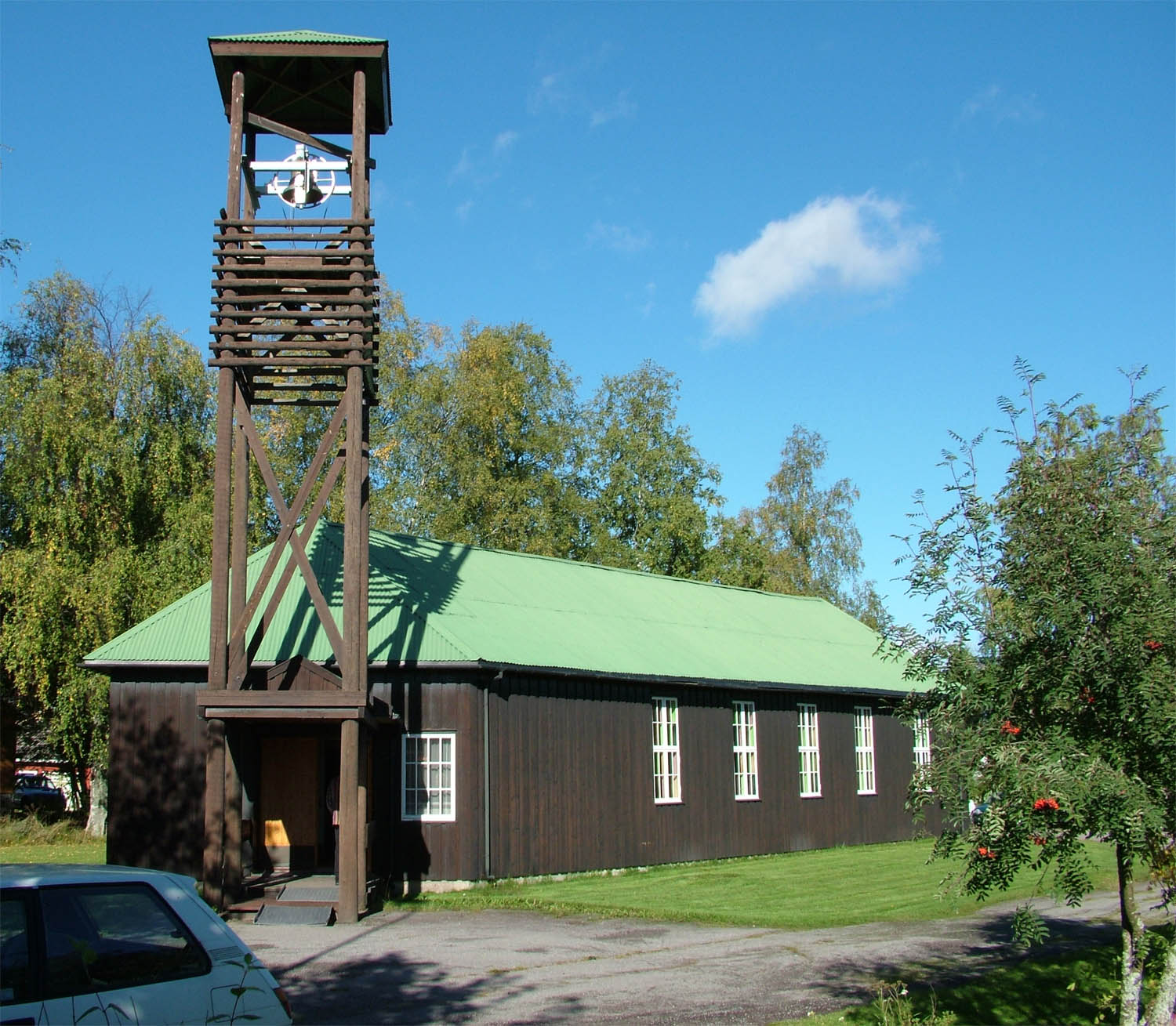
- View of the village church
- Interactive map of Roverud
- Location within Innlandet Location within Norway
- Coordinates: 60.25342°N 12.05225°E
- Country: Norway
- Region: Eastern Norway
- County: Innlandet
- District: Solør
- Municipality: Kongsvinger Municipality

Area
  - Total: 0.98 km^{2} (0.38 sq mi)
- Elevation: 150 m (490 ft)

Population (2024)
  - Total: 764
  - Density: 780/km^{2} (2,000/sq mi)
- Time zone: UTC+01:00 (CET)
  - Summer (DST): UTC+02:00 (CEST)
- Post Code: 2216 Roverud

Roverud is a village in Kongsvinger Municipality in Innlandet county, Norway. The village is located about 8 kilometres (5.0 mi) north of the town of Kongsvinger on the east side of the river Glomma. The village has a grocery store, a grade school, offices, elder care facilities, and Roverud Church.

The 0.98-square-kilometre (240-acre) village has a population (2024) of 764 and a population density of 780 inhabitants per square kilometre (2,000/sq mi).

== History ==
The area around Roverud had little significance apart from the medieval Berger Church which stood for many years (today the place is called Vestre Berger). Later, after the church was closed, people used the Brandval Church further north.

The road between Kongsvinger and Elverum went along the west side of the river Glomma across the river from Roverud until it reached the village of Brandval, but that changed when a bridge was built at Kongsvinger in 1855, after which traffic also went up the east side of the river. Roverud then became a central point for moving timber out of the Finnskogen region. The road from Svullrya over the mountains to Lundersæter was constructed from 1866 to 1870, and shortly thereafter that road from Lundersæter to Øyermoen on the Swedish border was completed.

The arrival of the railroad breathed life into Roverud. The Roverud Station on the Solørbanen railway line became operational in 1893, and it became one of the most important stations for the handling of timber from the Finnskogen area.

In 1936, Johannes Een moved from Voss Municipality to Roverud. In Roverud, he established the firm Brødrene Een A/S which produced his own patented lathwork shutters (forskalingslemmer). These shutters were a great success and were shipped throughout the country. Brødrene Een A/S then became one of the countries first producers of ready-made buildings. After World War II, the company became producers of ready-made housing as well.

== Notable people ==
- Bjørge Stensbøl, former head of the Norwegian Olympic sport program
- Even Pellerud, soccer coach
