= Brandval Municipality =

Former municipality in Hedmark, Norway

Brandval Municipality Brandval herred
- Former municipality
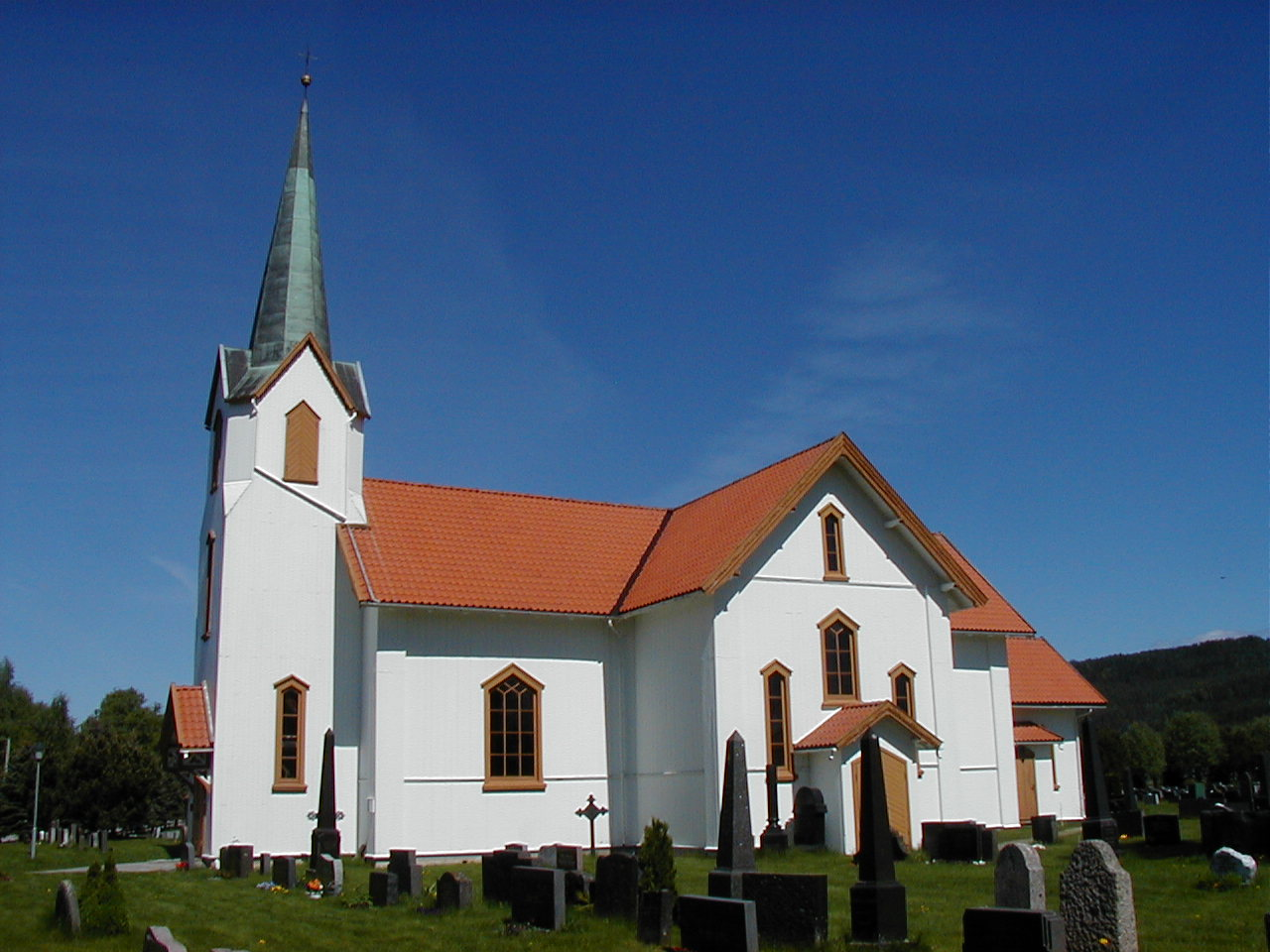
- View of the local Brandval Church

- Hedmark within Norway

- Brandval within Hedmark
- Coordinates: 60°19′N 12°02′E
- Country: Norway
- County: Hedmark
- District: Solør
- Established: 1 Jan 1867
  - Preceded by: Grue Municipality
- Disestablished: 1 Jan 1964
  - Succeeded by: Kongsvinger Municipality
- Administrative centre: Brandval

Government
  - Mayor (1948–1963): John Ruud

Area (upon dissolution)
  - Total: 528.9 km^{2} (204.2 sq mi)
  - Rank: #190 in Norway
- Highest elevation: 577 m (1,893 ft)

Population (1963)
  - Total: 4,445
  - Rank: #197 in Norway
  - Density: 8.4/km^{2} (22/sq mi)
  - Change (10 years): ▼ −5.5%
- Demonym: Brandvalsokning

Official language
  - Norwegian form: Bokmål
- Time zone: UTC+01:00 (CET)
  - Summer (DST): UTC+02:00 (CEST)
- ISO 3166 code: NO-0422

Brandval is a former municipality in the old Hedmark county, Norway. The 529-square-kilometre (204 sq mi) municipality existed from 1867 until its dissolution in 1964. The area is now part of Kongsvinger Municipality in the traditional district of Solør. The administrative centre was the village of Brandval where Brandval Church is located. Other villages in the municipality included Lundersæter and Roverud.

Prior to its dissolution in 1963, the 529-square-kilometre (204 sq mi) municipality was the 190th largest by area out of the 689 municipalities in Norway. Brandval Municipality was the 197th most populous municipality in Norway with a population of about 4,445. The municipality's population density was 8.4 inhabitants per square kilometre (22/sq mi) and its population had decreased by 5.5% over the previous 10-year period.

== General information ==
Historically, Brandval was part of the large parish of Grue. On 1 January 1838, when municipalities were established in Norway, Brandval was part of Grue Municipality, making up the southern part of the municipality. On 1 January 1867, the Brandval area (population: 3,946) was separated from Grue to become the new Brandval Municipality. This left Grue Municipality with 6,464 residents. In 1941 a small part of Grue Municipality (population: 68) was transferred to Brandval Municipality.

During the 1960s, there were many municipal mergers across Norway due to the work of the Schei Committee. On 1 January 1964, a large municipal merger took place which merged the following areas to form a new, larger Kongsvinger Municipality which had a total population of 12,990 residents.

- Brandval Municipality (population: 4,384)
- Vinger Municipality (population: 6,257)
- the town of Kongsvinger (population: 2,349)

=== Name ===
The municipality (originally the parish) is named after the old Brandval farm (Old Norse: Brandváll) since the first Brandval Church was built there. The first element is brandr which means "fire" or "burning". The last element is váll which means "land that is cleared by burning". Thus the name likely refers to a forested area that was cleared by burning.

=== Churches ===
The Church of Norway had one parish (sokn) within Brandval Municipality. At the time of the municipal dissolution, it was part of the Brandval prestegjeld and the Solør prosti (deanery) in the Diocese of Hamar.

Churches in Brandval
| Parish (sokn) | Church name | Location of the church | Year built |
|---|---|---|---|
| Brandval | Brandval Church | Brandval | 1651 |
| Brandval | Lundersæter Chapel | Lundersæter | 1868 |

== Geography ==
The municipality included the populated Glomma river valley in the west and the more sparsely populated Finnskogen forest area in the east. The highest point in the municipality was the 577-metre (1,893 ft) tall mountain Rafjellet, just south of the border with Grue Municipality. Grue Municipality was located to the north, Sør-Odal Municipality was located to the west, and Vinger Municipality was located to the south. To the east of Brandval Municipality was Fryksände Municipality (present-day Torsby Municipality) in Sweden.

== Government ==
While it existed, Brandval Municipality was responsible for primary education (through 10th grade), outpatient health services, senior citizen services, welfare and other social services, zoning, economic development, and municipal roads and utilities. The municipality was governed by a municipal council of directly elected representatives. The mayor was indirectly elected by a vote of the municipal council. The municipality was under the jurisdiction of the Eidsivating Court of Appeal.

=== Municipal council ===
The municipal council (Herredsstyre) of Brandval Municipality was made up of 21 representatives that were elected to four year terms. The tables below show the historical composition of the council by political party.

Brandval herredsstyre 1959–1963
| Party name (in Norwegian) | Number of representatives |
|---|---|
| Labour Party (Arbeiderpartiet) | 14 |
| Conservative Party (Høyre) | 1 |
| Communist Party (Kommunistiske Parti) | 3 |
| Christian Democratic Party (Kristelig Folkeparti) | 1 |
| Centre Party (Senterpartiet) | 2 |
| Total number of members: | 21 |
Note: On 1 January 1964, Brandval Municipality became part of Kongsvinger Municipality.

Brandval herredsstyre 1955–1959
| Party name (in Norwegian) | Number of representatives |
|---|---|
| Labour Party (Arbeiderpartiet) | 14 |
| Conservative Party (Høyre) | 1 |
| Communist Party (Kommunistiske Parti) | 3 |
| Farmers' Party (Bondepartiet) | 2 |
| Liberal Party (Venstre) | 1 |
| Total number of members: | 21 |

Brandval herredsstyre 1951–1955
| Party name (in Norwegian) | Number of representatives |
|---|---|
| Labour Party (Arbeiderpartiet) | 11 |
| Communist Party (Kommunistiske Parti) | 3 |
| Farmers' Party (Bondepartiet) | 2 |
| Total number of members: | 16 |

Brandval herredsstyre 1947–1951
| Party name (in Norwegian) | Number of representatives |
|---|---|
| Labour Party (Arbeiderpartiet) | 9 |
| Communist Party (Kommunistiske Parti) | 4 |
| Christian Democratic Party (Kristelig Folkeparti) | 1 |
| Joint List(s) of Non-Socialist Parties (Borgerlige Felleslister) | 2 |
| Total number of members: | 16 |

Brandval herredsstyre 1945–1947
| Party name (in Norwegian) | Number of representatives |
|---|---|
| Labour Party (Arbeiderpartiet) | 8 |
| Communist Party (Kommunistiske Parti) | 5 |
| Christian Democratic Party (Kristelig Folkeparti) | 1 |
| Joint list of the Liberal Party (Venstre) and the Radical People's Party (Radikale Folkepartiet) | 1 |
| Joint List(s) of Non-Socialist Parties (Borgerlige Felleslister) | 1 |
| Total number of members: | 16 |

Brandval herredsstyre 1937–1941*
| Party name (in Norwegian) | Number of representatives |
|---|---|
| Labour Party (Arbeiderpartiet) | 11 |
| Farmers' Party (Bondepartiet) | 2 |
| Liberal Party (Venstre) | 2 |
| Local List(s) (Lokale lister) | 1 |
| Total number of members: | 16 |
Note: Due to the German occupation of Norway during World War II, no elections were held for new municipal councils until after the war ended in 1945.

=== Mayors ===
The mayor (Norwegian: ordfører) of Brandval Municipality was the political leader of the municipality and the chairperson of the municipal council. The following people have held this position:

- 1868–1870: Lars Bredesen Breen
- 1871–1886: Per Hansen Gjølstad
- 1887–1889: Kolbjørn Olsen
- 1890–1897: Per Hansen Gjølstad
- 1898–1901: Martin Hansen
- 1902–1910: Arne Næss
- 1911–1913: Rangvald Jahr
- 1914–1919: Nils Aas
- 1920–1931: Ole Ruud
- 1932–1934: Kasper Dalermoen
- 1935–1936: Arnt Nylund
- 1937–1937: Thor Hals
- 1938–1940: Gustav Storhæsen
- 1941–1945: Ole Sandbæk
- 1945–1947: Anton Braaten
- 1948–1963: John Ruud

== See also ==
- List of former municipalities of Norway
