= Roverud Church =

Church in Innlandet, Norway

- Roverud kirke
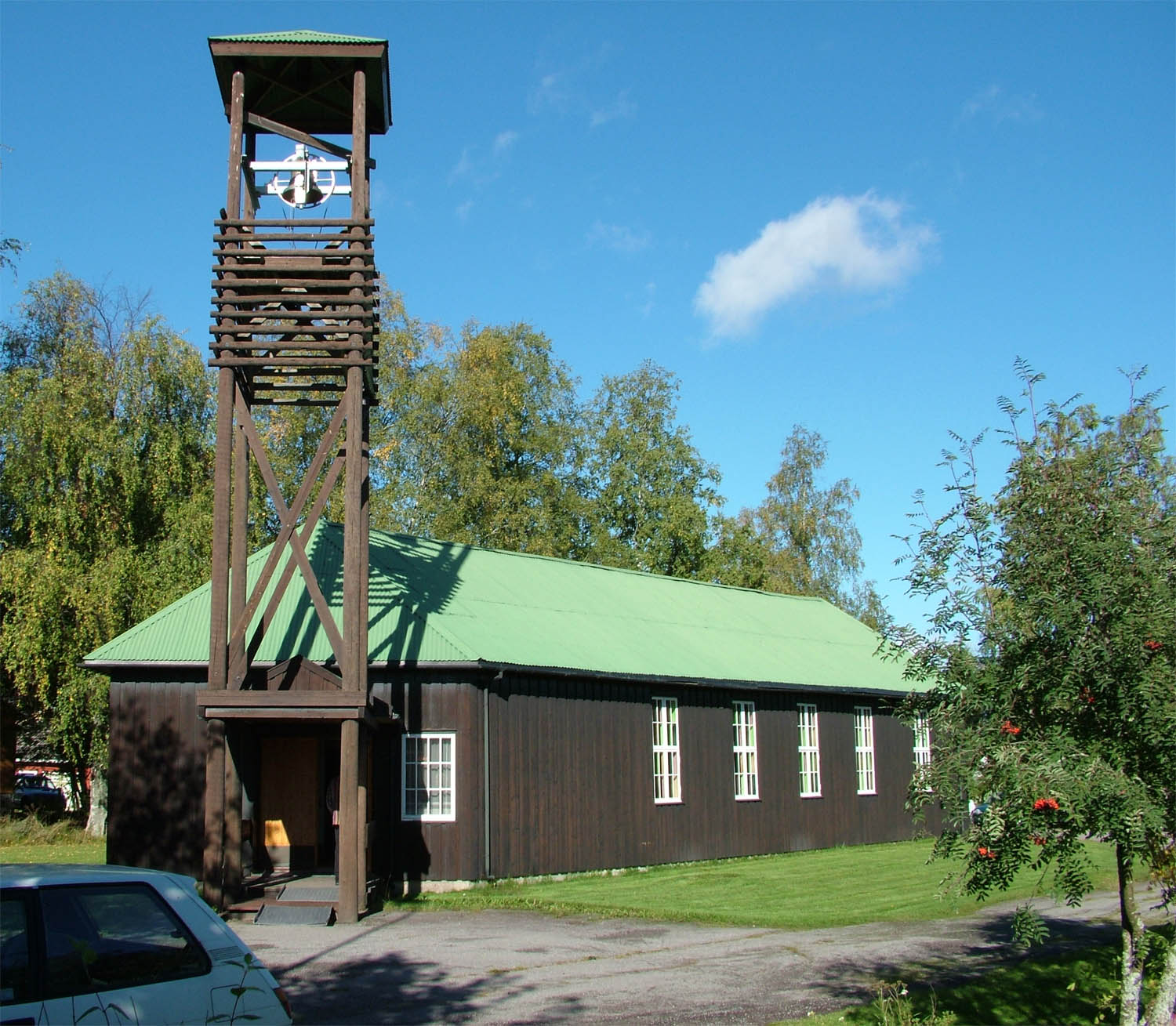
- View of the church
- Roverud Church
- 60°15′13″N 12°03′23″E
- Location: Kongsvinger, Innlandet
- Country: Norway
- Denomination: Church of Norway
- Churchmanship: Evangelical Lutheran

History
- Status: Chapel
- Founded: 1969
- Consecrated: 7 April 1969

Architecture
- Functional status: Active
- Architect: Ola B. Aasness
- Architectural type: Long church
- Completed: 1969 (57 years ago)

Specifications
- Capacity: 140
- Materials: Wood

Administration
- Diocese: Hamar bispedømme
- Deanery: Solør, Vinger og Odal prosti
- Parish: Brandval
- Norwegian Cultural Heritage Site
- Type: Church
- Status: Not protected
- ID: 85321

Roverud Church (Norwegian: Roverud kirke) is a chapel of the Church of Norway in Kongsvinger Municipality in Innlandet county, Norway. It is located in the village of Roverud. It is an annex chapel in the Brandval parish which is part of the Solør, Vinger og Odal prosti (deanery) in the Diocese of Hamar. The white, wooden church was built in a long church design in 1969 using plans drawn up by the architect Ola B. Aasness. The church seats about 140 people.

== History ==
There was a medieval stave church north of Roverud until the 15th century before Brandval Church took over as the main parish church for the Roverud area. During the 1960s, there was a local push for a chapel to be built in Roverud. The Roverud Mission Society donated its mission house in 1964 to be used for a chapel. A major renovation was carried out, and the chapel was consecrated by the bishop on 7 April 1969. Since 1988, it has been designated as a church although it is technically a bedehuskapell within the Brandval Church parish.

== See also ==
- List of churches in Hamar
