= Kongsvinger Municipality =

Municipality in Innlandet, Norway

Kongsvinger Municipality Kongsvinger kommune
- Municipality
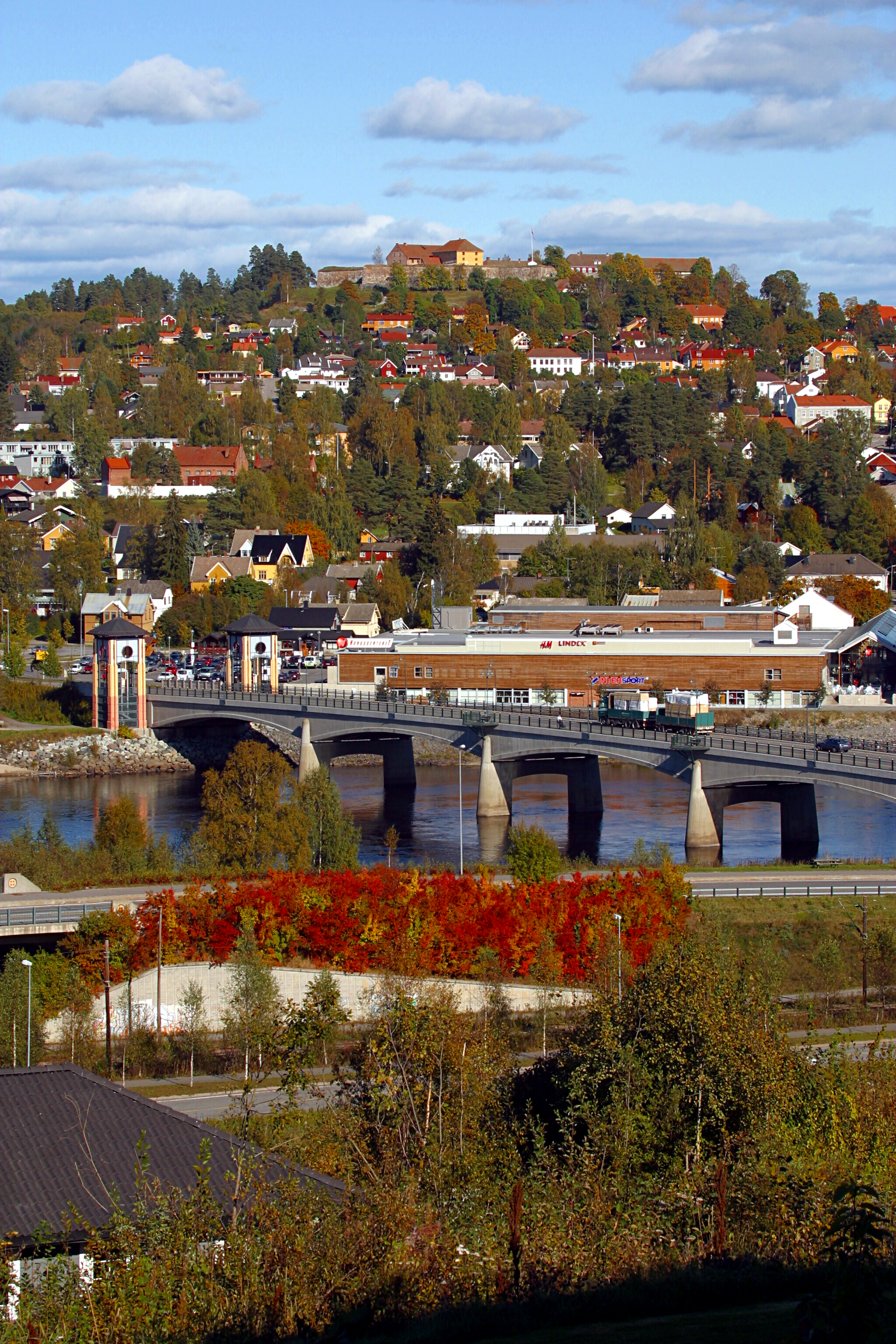
- View of the town (September 2009)

- Coat of arms

- Innlandet within Norway

- Kongsvinger within Innlandet
- Coordinates: 60°14′35″N 12°13′32″E
- Country: Norway
- County: Innlandet
- District: Glåmdal
- Established: 7 February 1855
  - Preceded by: Vinger Municipality
- Administrative centre: Kongsvinger

Government
  - Mayor (2023): Elin Såheim Bjørkli (Ap)

Area
  - Total: 1,036.45 km^{2} (400.18 sq mi)
  - Land: 952.79 km^{2} (367.87 sq mi)
  - Water: 83.66 km^{2} (32.30 sq mi) 8.1%
  - Rank: #111 in Norway
- Highest elevation: 576.95 m (1,892.9 ft)

Population (2025)
  - Total: 18,109
  - Rank: #73 in Norway
  - Density: 17.5/km^{2} (45/sq mi)
  - Change (10 years): ▲ +1.3%

Official language
  - Norwegian form: Bokmål
- Time zone: UTC+01:00 (CET)
  - Summer (DST): UTC+02:00 (CEST)
- ISO 3166 code: NO-3401
- Website: Official website

Kongsvinger is a municipality in Innlandet county, Norway. It is located in the traditional district of Glåmdal (or historically Vinger). The administrative centre of the municipality is the town of Kongsvinger. Other settlements in the municipality include Austmarka, Brandval, Lundersæter, and Roverud.

The 1,036-square-kilometre (400 sq mi) municipality is the 111th largest by area out of the 357 municipalities in Norway. Kongsvinger Municipality is the 73rd most populous municipality in Norway with a population of 18,109. The municipality's population density is 17.5 inhabitants per square kilometre (45/sq mi) and its population has increased by 1.3% over the previous 10-year period. Kongsvinger's eastern municipal boundary is the Norway–Sweden border.

== General information ==
In 1854, the King designated the market town of Kongsvinger as a kjøpstad, which gave it special rights. The designation included a small patch of land on both sides of the river Glomma with an area of approximately 5.2 square kilometres (2 mi^{2}). Because of this designation, on 7 February 1855, the town was separated from Vinger Municipality to form the new Kongsvinger Municipality which was coterminous with the town. Initially, the town had 472 residents and this left Vinger Municipality with 10,947 residents. On 1 January 1876, the town was enlarged when an area of Vinger Municipality (population: 209) was transferred into Kongsvinger.

During the 1960s, there were many municipal mergers across Norway due to the work of the Schei Committee. On 1 January 1964, the following areas were merged to form a new, larger Kongsvinger Municipality:

- the town of Kongsvinger (population: 2,345)
- Vinger Municipality (population: 6,257)
- Brandval Municipality (population: 4,384)

At that time, Norwegian municipalities were classified as urban municipality (Norwegian: bykommune), sometimes called towns or cities, and rural municipalities. After the merger, Kongsvinger Municipality lost its status as an urban municipality due to merging with rural municipalities. One year later, on 1 January 1965, the government redesignated Kongsvinger as an urban municipality (the government later changed the law and removed the distinction of urban and rural municipalities.

On 1 January 1974, the unpopulated Lystad area was transferred from Grue Municipality to Kongsvinger Municipality. On 1 January 1986, the northern part of the Åbogen area (population: 14) was transferred from Kongsvinger Municipality to the neighboring Eidskog Municipality.

Historically, the municipality was part of the old Hedmark county. On 1 January 2020, the municipality became a part of the newly-formed Innlandet county (after Hedmark and Oppland counties were merged).

=== Name ===
The whole region where Kongsvinger is located was historically called Vinger (Old Norse: Vingr). This name could be related to the river Glomma which flows through the region. One could compare this to the English word swing (for the missing s see Indo-European s-mobile). The river Glomma passes through the center of the district where the south-flowing river takes a sharp northwestward turn. This can be compared to the similar Lithuanian word vìngis which means "bend", "bow", or "turn". This old name used to represent this whole area. The first element of the name is the possessive form of kong (meaning "the King's") was added after the Kongsvinger Fortress was built in 1690. It was first applied only to the fortress (written as Königs Winger in old documents). Then, it was later given to the town that grew up around the fortress.

=== Coat of arms ===
The coat of arms was granted on 25 June 1926. The design is a stylized representation of Kongsvinger Fortress towering high above the river Glomma. The river is rendered as a wavy bar in the bottom half of the design. The river and fortress have a tincture of argent which means they are commonly colored white, but if the arms are made out of metal, then silver is used. The lower part of the arms represent the land and the mountain on which the fortress sits. This area has a background in black to represent the local conifer forest. The curved upper part of the background is colored red to symbolize the sky. The color is taken from the Norwegian flag to mark the national historical importance of the fortress. A mural crown is often shown above the escutcheon to indicate that the town of Kongsvinger is located in the municipality. The arms were designed by J. W. Oftedal.

=== Churches ===
The Church of Norway has three parishes (sokn) within Kongsvinger Municipality. It is part of the Solør, Vinger og Odal prosti (deanery) in the Diocese of Hamar.

Churches in Kongsvinger
Parish (sokn)	Church name	Location of the church	Year built
Austmarka	Austmarka Church	Austmarka	1858
Brandval	Brandval Church	Brandval	1651
Brandval	Lundersæter Church	Lundersæter	1868
Brandval	Roverud Church	Roverud	1969
Vinger	Vinger Church	Kongsvinger	1699

== History ==
The area was historically a part of the prestegjeld of Vinger. The village that later became Kongsvinger already existed as a trading center by the Middle Ages, due to the accessibility by natural waterways. Viking chieftains reached Sweden by boat from Kongsvinger. Kongsvinger Fortress was founded in 1669, and a star-shaped plan was laid out for the fortress. Work began in 1682 and it was finished in 1690 as part of a general upgrade to Norwegian fortresses. The building of the fortress formed the foundations for what was to become the town of Kongsvinger. The fortress was built as a defensive structure against the Swedes, and on numerous occasions there have been military engagements in the area around the fortress, but Kongsvinger fortress has never been taken in military combat. Below Kongsvinger fortress lies Øvrebyen, which literally translated means "upper town". This is the oldest part of the town of Kongsvinger, and one can still find a number of the original houses built after the establishment of the fortress. Kongsvinger Museum is located here, together with a museum of female emancipation in a building called "Rolighed", the home of Dagny Juel, the famous author once portrayed by Edvard Munch.

The rural, eastern parts of Kongsvinger and its neighboring municipalities to the north and south were populated at the end of the 17th century by Finnish emigrants who came across the Swedish border. The area is called Finnskogen which means "The Finnish forest".

Kongsvinger played an important part in the Norwegian resistance force against the Nazis being a gateway to Sweden. Norway's highest decorated citizen, Gunnar Sønsteby frequently passed through Kongsvinger in his work to sabotage the Nazis' installations in Norway. Some of the busiest escape routes for refugees also went through Kongsvinger to Sweden.

From 1983 to 1999, and again in 2010, Kongsvinger's association football team KIL Toppfotball held a position in the Norwegian Premier League. It made some notable merits participating in the UEFA Cup and winning a silver medal during the 1992 season.

== Government ==
Kongsvinger Municipality is responsible for primary education (through 10th grade), outpatient health services, senior citizen services, welfare and other social services, zoning, economic development, and municipal roads and utilities. The municipality is governed by a municipal council of directly elected representatives. The mayor is indirectly elected by a vote of the municipal council. The municipality is under the jurisdiction of the Romerike og Glåmdal District Court and the Eidsivating Court of Appeal.

=== Municipal council ===
The municipal council (Kommunestyre) of Kongsvinger Municipality is made up of 33 representatives that are elected to four year terms. The tables below show the current and historical composition of the council by political party.

Kongsvinger kommunestyre 2023–2027
Party name (in Norwegian)	Number of representatives
Labour Party (Arbeiderpartiet)	10
Progress Party (Fremskrittspartiet)	4
Conservative Party (Høyre)	7
Christian Democratic Party (Kristelig Folkeparti)	1
Pensioners' Party (Pensjonistpartiet)	4
Red Party (Rødt)	1
Centre Party (Senterpartiet)	3
Socialist Left Party (Sosialistisk Venstreparti)	2
Liberal Party (Venstre)	1
Total number of members:	33

Kongsvinger kommunestyre 2019–2023
Party name (in Norwegian)	Number of representatives
Labour Party (Arbeiderpartiet)	10
Progress Party (Fremskrittspartiet)	2
Green Party (Miljøpartiet De Grønne)	1
Conservative Party (Høyre)	4
Christian Democratic Party (Kristelig Folkeparti)	1
Pensioners' Party (Pensjonistpartiet)	3
Red Party (Rødt)	1
Centre Party (Senterpartiet)	8
Socialist Left Party (Sosialistisk Venstreparti)	2
Liberal Party (Venstre)	1
Total number of members:	33

Kongsvinger kommunestyre 2015–2019
Party name (in Norwegian)	Number of representatives
Labour Party (Arbeiderpartiet)	16
Progress Party (Fremskrittspartiet)	3
Green Party (Miljøpartiet De Grønne)	1
Conservative Party (Høyre)	6
Christian Democratic Party (Kristelig Folkeparti)	1
Pensioners' Party (Pensjonistpartiet)	2
Centre Party (Senterpartiet)	2
Socialist Left Party (Sosialistisk Venstreparti)	1
Liberal Party (Venstre)	1
Total number of members:	33

Kongsvinger kommunestyre 2011–2015
Party name (in Norwegian)	Number of representatives
Labour Party (Arbeiderpartiet)	11
Progress Party (Fremskrittspartiet)	5
Conservative Party (Høyre)	6
Christian Democratic Party (Kristelig Folkeparti)	1
Pensioners' Party (Pensjonistpartiet)	5
Centre Party (Senterpartiet)	2
Socialist Left Party (Sosialistisk Venstreparti)	1
Liberal Party (Venstre)	2
Total number of members:	33

Kongsvinger kommunestyre 2007–2011
Party name (in Norwegian)	Number of representatives
Labour Party (Arbeiderpartiet)	10
Progress Party (Fremskrittspartiet)	6
Conservative Party (Høyre)	5
Christian Democratic Party (Kristelig Folkeparti)	1
Pensioners' Party (Pensjonistpartiet)	5
Centre Party (Senterpartiet)	2
Socialist Left Party (Sosialistisk Venstreparti)	3
Liberal Party (Venstre)	1
Total number of members:	33

Kongsvinger kommunestyre 2003–2007
Party name (in Norwegian)	Number of representatives
Labour Party (Arbeiderpartiet)	12
Progress Party (Fremskrittspartiet)	5
Conservative Party (Høyre)	6
Christian Democratic Party (Kristelig Folkeparti)	1
Centre Party (Senterpartiet)	2
Socialist Left Party (Sosialistisk Venstreparti)	6
Liberal Party (Venstre)	1
Total number of members:	33

Kongsvinger kommunestyre 1999–2003
Party name (in Norwegian)	Number of representatives
Labour Party (Arbeiderpartiet)	12
Progress Party (Fremskrittspartiet)	4
Conservative Party (Høyre)	11
Christian Democratic Party (Kristelig Folkeparti)	2
Centre Party (Senterpartiet)	2
Socialist Left Party (Sosialistisk Venstreparti)	5
Town and local list (By- og bygdelista)	1
Total number of members:	37

Kongsvinger kommunestyre 1995–1999
Party name (in Norwegian)	Number of representatives
Labour Party (Arbeiderpartiet)	19
Progress Party (Fremskrittspartiet)	4
Conservative Party (Høyre)	9
Christian Democratic Party (Kristelig Folkeparti)	1
Centre Party (Senterpartiet)	4
Socialist Left Party (Sosialistisk Venstreparti)	5
Liberal Party (Venstre)	1
Free Democrats (Fridemokratene)	1
Kongsvinger town and local list (Kongsvinger by og bygdeliste)	1
Total number of members:	45

Kongsvinger kommunestyre 1991–1995
Party name (in Norwegian)	Number of representatives
Labour Party (Arbeiderpartiet)	20
Progress Party (Fremskrittspartiet)	4
Conservative Party (Høyre)	5
Christian Democratic Party (Kristelig Folkeparti)	1
Centre Party (Senterpartiet)	4
Socialist Left Party (Sosialistisk Venstreparti)	9
Liberal Party (Venstre)	1
Kongsvinger town and local list (Kongsvinger by og bygdeliste)	1
Total number of members:	45

Kongsvinger kommunestyre 1987–1991
Party name (in Norwegian)	Number of representatives
Labour Party (Arbeiderpartiet)	27
Progress Party (Fremskrittspartiet)	4
Conservative Party (Høyre)	6
Christian Democratic Party (Kristelig Folkeparti)	1
Centre Party (Senterpartiet)	2
Socialist Left Party (Sosialistisk Venstreparti)	4
Liberal Party (Venstre)	1
Total number of members:	45

Kongsvinger kommunestyre 1983–1987
Party name (in Norwegian)	Number of representatives
Labour Party (Arbeiderpartiet)	28
Progress Party (Fremskrittspartiet)	3
Conservative Party (Høyre)	6
Christian Democratic Party (Kristelig Folkeparti)	1
Centre Party (Senterpartiet)	3
Socialist Left Party (Sosialistisk Venstreparti)	3
Liberal Party (Venstre)	1
Total number of members:	45

Kongsvinger kommunestyre 1979–1983
Party name (in Norwegian)	Number of representatives
Labour Party (Arbeiderpartiet)	27
Conservative Party (Høyre)	8
Christian Democratic Party (Kristelig Folkeparti)	2
Centre Party (Senterpartiet)	4
Socialist Left Party (Sosialistisk Venstreparti)	3
Liberal Party (Venstre)	1
Total number of members:	45

Kongsvinger kommunestyre 1975–1979
Party name (in Norwegian)	Number of representatives
Labour Party (Arbeiderpartiet)	28
Conservative Party (Høyre)	5
Christian Democratic Party (Kristelig Folkeparti)	2
New People's Party (Nye Folkepartiet)	1
Centre Party (Senterpartiet)	5
Socialist Left Party (Sosialistisk Venstreparti)	4
Total number of members:	45

Kongsvinger kommunestyre 1971–1975
Party name (in Norwegian)	Number of representatives
Labour Party (Arbeiderpartiet)	31
Conservative Party (Høyre)	4
Communist Party (Kommunistiske Parti)	1
Christian Democratic Party (Kristelig Folkeparti)	1
Centre Party (Senterpartiet)	4
Socialist People's Party (Sosialistisk Folkeparti)	3
Liberal Party (Venstre)	1
Total number of members:	45

Kongsvinger kommunestyre 1967–1971
Party name (in Norwegian)	Number of representatives
Labour Party (Arbeiderpartiet)	30
Conservative Party (Høyre)	4
Communist Party (Kommunistiske Parti)	1
Christian Democratic Party (Kristelig Folkeparti)	1
Centre Party (Senterpartiet)	4
Socialist People's Party (Sosialistisk Folkeparti)	3
Liberal Party (Venstre)	2
Total number of members:	45

Kongsvinger kommunestyre 1963–1967
Party name (in Norwegian)	Number of representatives
Labour Party (Arbeiderpartiet)	32
Conservative Party (Høyre)	4
Communist Party (Kommunistiske Parti)	2
Christian Democratic Party (Kristelig Folkeparti)	1
Centre Party (Senterpartiet)	4
Liberal Party (Venstre)	2
Total number of members:	45
Note: On 1 January 1964, the town of Kongsvinger was merged with Brandval Municipality and Vinger Municipality to make a much larger municipality.

Kongsvinger bystyre 1959–1963
Party name (in Norwegian)	Number of representatives
Labour Party (Arbeiderpartiet)	12
Conservative Party (Høyre)	6
Liberal Party (Venstre)	3
Total number of members:	21

Kongsvinger bystyre 1955–1959
Party name (in Norwegian)	Number of representatives
Labour Party (Arbeiderpartiet)	11
Conservative Party (Høyre)	6
Liberal Party (Venstre)	4
Total number of members:	21

Kongsvinger bystyre 1951–1955
Party name (in Norwegian)	Number of representatives
Labour Party (Arbeiderpartiet)	10
Conservative Party (Høyre)	5
Communist Party (Kommunistiske Parti)	1
Liberal Party (Venstre)	4
Total number of members:	20

Kongsvinger bystyre 1947–1951
Party name (in Norwegian)	Number of representatives
Labour Party (Arbeiderpartiet)	9
Conservative Party (Høyre)	5
Communist Party (Kommunistiske Parti)	2
Joint list of the Liberal Party (Venstre) and the Radical People's Party (Radikale Folkepartiet)	4
Total number of members:	20

Kongsvinger bystyre 1945–1947
Party name (in Norwegian)	Number of representatives
Labour Party (Arbeiderpartiet)	11
Communist Party (Kommunistiske Parti)	1
Joint list of the Liberal Party (Venstre) and the Radical People's Party (Radikale Folkepartiet)	2
Local List(s) (Lokale lister)	6
Total number of members:	20

Kongsvinger bystyre 1937–1941*
Party name (in Norwegian)	Number of representatives
Labour Party (Arbeiderpartiet)	7
Liberal Party (Venstre)	5
Local List(s) (Lokale lister)	8
Total number of members:	20
Note: Due to the German occupation of Norway during World War II, no elections were held for new municipal councils until after the war ended in 1945.

Kongsvinger bystyre 1934–1937
Party name (in Norwegian)	Number of representatives
Labour Party (Arbeiderpartiet)	7
Liberal Party (Venstre)	5
Local List(s) (Lokale lister)	8
Total number of members:	20

=== Mayors ===
The mayor (Norwegian: ordfører) of Kongsvinger Municipality is the political leader of the municipality and the chairperson of the municipal council. Here is a list of people who have held this position:

- 1855–1856: Jacob N. Hygen
- 1857–1859: S. Christian Strøm
- 1859–1859: Sigvald Rynning
- 1860–1860: Christian Kruse
- 1861–1877: Hans Hansen
- 1877–1880: C.F. Heidenreich
- 1881–1884: A. Knagenhjelm Blix
- 1885–1888: Lorentzo Rynning
- 1889–1898: Carl Henriksen
- 1899–1907: O.A. Herud
- 1908–1910: Otto Aamodt
- 1911–1913: O.A. Herud
- 1914–1914: Kristian Walby
- 1915–1919: Axel Engebretsen
- 1920–1920: Sigvald Olsen
- 1921–1922: Eiler Baanerud
- 1923–1925: Jacob Forseth
- 1926–1928: Thomas Johnsen
- 1929–1931: Eiler Baanerud
- 1932–1932: Christian Voss
- 1933–1933: H. Wallerud
- 1934–1934: Christian Voss
- 1935–1940: Eiler Baanerud
- 1940–1941: R. Talhaug (NS)
- 1942–1943: Erling Huseby (NS)
- 1944–1945: Johan Nitteberg (NS)
- 1945–1945: Eiler Baanerud
- 1946–1964: Aasmund Grimstad
- 1964–1975: Norvald Strand (Ap)
- 1975–1984: Odd Finsrud (Ap)
- 1984–1993: Terje Pedersen (Ap)
- 1994–1995: Jan K. Kristiansen (SV)
- 1995–1995: Johanne Wetterhus (H)
- 1995–1999: Trond Hansen (Ap)
- 1999–2011: Arve Bones (Ap)
- 2011–2015: Øystein Østgaard (H)
- 2015–2019: Sjur Strand (Ap)
- 2019–2021: Margrethe Haarr (Sp)
- 2021–2023: Eli Wathne (H)
- 2023–present: Elin Såheim Bjørkli (Ap)

== Geography ==
Kongsvinger Municipality is situated on both sides of the river Glomma, where the south-flowing river takes a sharp northwestward turn. The Kongsvinger Fortress is the main landmark, situated on a hill west and north of the river. Kongsvinger is a regional center of the Glåmdal region, which is made up of the southern parts of Innlandet county. Kongsvinger Municipality is about 110 kilometres (68 mi) from Oslo and 70 kilometres (43 mi) from Oslo Airport, Gardermoen.

Kongsvinger Municipality is bordered to the south and southwest by Eidskog Municipality, to the west by Sør-Odal Municipality, to the north by Grue Municipality, to the east by Torsby Municipality (Sweden), and to the southeast by Eda Municipality and Arvika Municipality (both in Sweden). The highest point in the municipality is the 576.95-metre (1,892.9 ft) tall mountain Rafjellet.

The Holtbergmasta, a 163-metre (535 ft) tall guyed mast for FM-/TV-broadcasting on Holtberget (60.167602°N 11.994356°E) was built in 1967.

== Transportation ==
Number of minorities (1st and 2nd generation) in Kongsvinger by country of origin in 2017
Ancestry	Number
Sweden	198
Iraq	186
Poland	186
Afghanistan	147
Bosnia-Herzegovina	142
Vietnam	123
Iran	94
Eritrea	80
Syria	71
Thailand	65

Travel to and from Kongsvinger:

- Several daily train services to Oslo
- Twice daily train services to Stockholm, Sweden
- Five daily train services to Karlstad, Sweden
- Several daily bus services to Elverum and Hamar in Norway and also to Charlottenberg, Sweden
- Suburban bus services running throughout the town of Kongsvinger
- Four lane highway between Kongsvinger and Oslo is under construction.

Air travel is served by Gardermoen Airport.

=== Distances ===
The following are road distances to Kongsvinger from various locations:

Starting location	Distance to Kongsvinger
Oslo	94 km (58 mi)
Oslo Airport, Gardermoen	74 km (46 mi)
Hamar	100 km (62 mi)
Elverum	95 km (59 mi)
Trondheim	450 km (280 mi)
Bergen	545 km (339 mi)
Tromsø	1,600 km (990 mi)
Charlottenberg (Sweden)	44 km (27 mi)
Arvika (Sweden)	79 km (49 mi)
Karlstad (Sweden)	150 km (93 mi)
Stockholm (Sweden)	455 km (283 mi)
Copenhagen (Denmark)	636 km (395 mi)

== Economy ==
There are 1,530 businesses including forestry and farming, and 245 of these are retail outlets. There are 25,000 square metres (269,098 ft^{2}) of mall situated in the downtown area. As well as downtown shopping streets, there are also glass domed pedestrian shopping streets. The governmental regional Kongsvinger Hospital is also situated in Kongsvinger.

=== Major businesses ===
- InfoCare Computer service and logistics
- Eidsiva Energi customer service unit (energy)
- Ibas (IT)
- Thales (IT)
- Metso Minerals (conveyor belts)
- Schütz Nordic (plastic)
- Statistics Norway
- Telenor customer service unit (telecommunications)
- TI Automotive (fuel systems)

== Education ==
In the town of Kongsvinger:
- Politihøgskolen (Norwegian Police University College)
- Høgskolesenteret i Kongsvinger (University College)
- Øvrebyen VGS (high school)
- Sentrum VGS (high school)
- Norges Toppidrettsgymnas (middle school and high school)
- Kongsvinger ungdomsskole (middle school)
- Vennersberg barneskole (primary school)
- Marikollen barneskole (primary school)
- Langeland barneskole (primary school)
Elsewhere in the municipality:
- Austmarka barne- og ungdomsskole (primary and middle school)
- Roverud barneskole (primary school)
- Brandval skole (primary school)
- Finnskogen Montessoriskole

== Notable people ==
=== Public service & public thinking ===
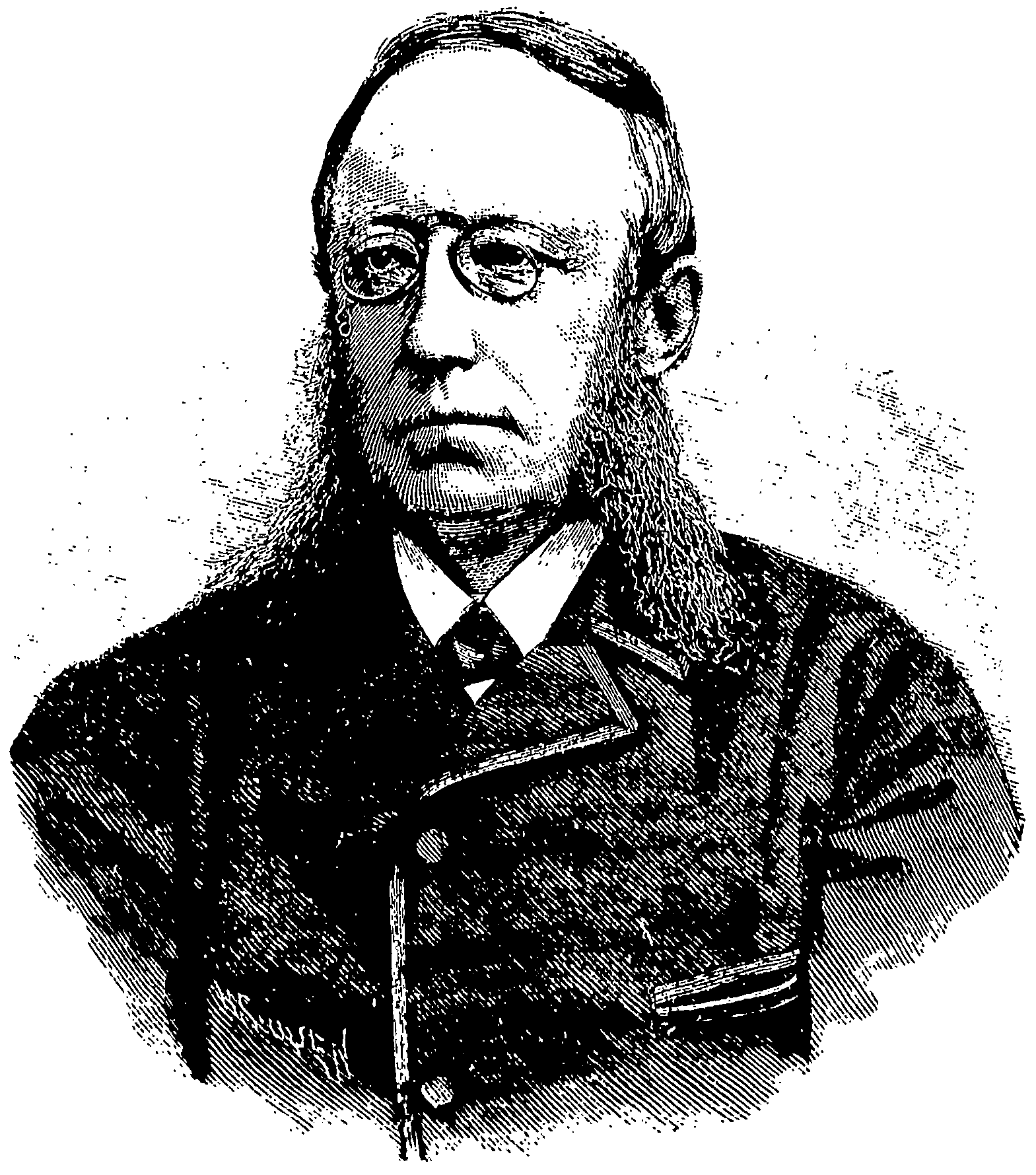
Jacob Stang, 1884

- Cathrine Dahl (1855—1906), the first female lawyer in Norway
- Christen Schmidt (1727 in Kongsvinger – 1804), the Bishop of the Diocese of Oslo in 1773
- Georg Ræder (1814 in Kongsvinger – 1898), a military officer, railway pioneer, and politician
- Hans Georg Jacob Stang (1830–1907), an attorney and Norway's Prime Minister from 1888–1889; established his legal practice in Kongsvinger in 1859
- Anna Stang (1834–1901), a feminist, liberal politician, president of the Norwegian Association for Women's Rights, and wife of Jacob Stang who ran a private school in Kongsvinger for 17 years
- Carl Wille Schnitler (1879 in Brandval – 1926), an art historian
- Rudolf Falck Ræder (1881 in Kongsvinger – 1951), a military officer, engineer, and politician
- Åse Wisløff Nilssen (born 1945 in Kongsvinger), a Norwegian politician
- Tove Strand (born 1946 in Kongsvinger), a Norwegian politician
- Per Hjalmar Nakstad (born 1946 in Kongsvinger), a radiologist
- Monica Kristensen Solås (born 1950), a glaciologist, polar explorer, and crime novelist; brought up in Kongsvinger
- Karin Andersen (born 1952), a Norwegian politician who served as MP for the Socialist Left Party

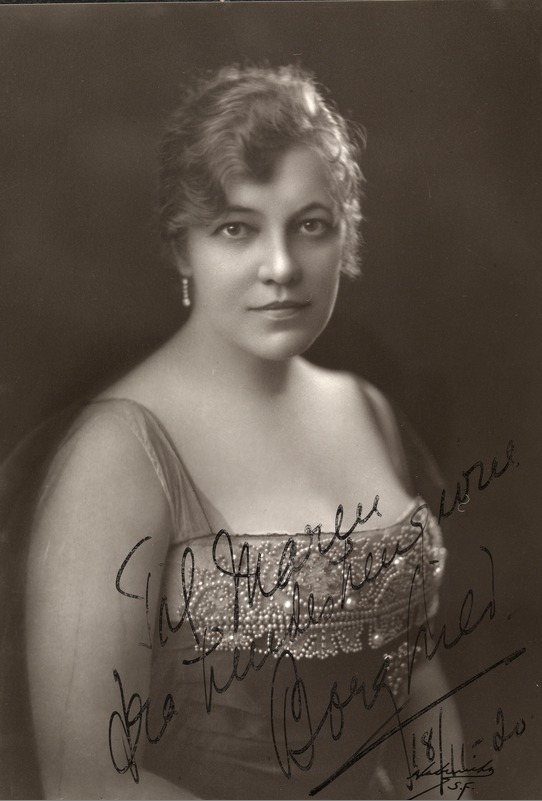
Borghild Bryhn Langaard, 1920

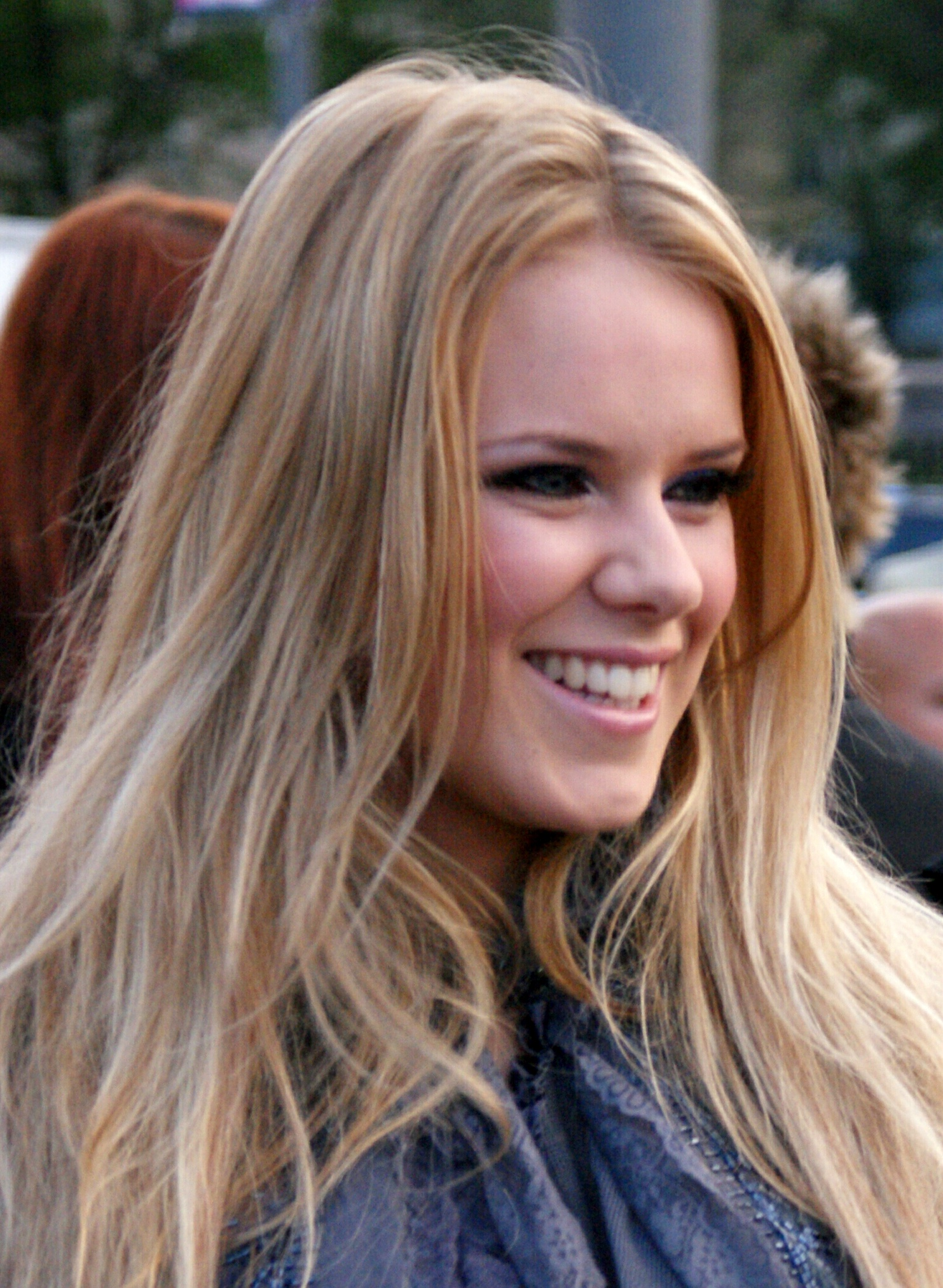
Yohanna, 2009

=== The Arts ===
- Maren Elisabeth Bang (1797 in Skansgården – 1884), a writer who wrote the first printed Norwegian cookbook
- Erika Nissen (1845 in Kongsvinger – 1903), a pianist
- Wilhelmine Gulowsen (1848 in Kongsvinger – 1899), a writer
- Erik Werenskiold (1855 in Eidskog – 1938), a painter and illustrator
- Dagny Juel (1867 in Kongsvinger – 1901), a writer who was famous for her liaisons with various prominent artists and for the dramatic circumstances of her death
- Borghild Langaard (1883 in Kongsvinger – 1939), an operatic soprano
- Eva Lund Haugen (1907 in Kongsvinger – 1996), an American author, editor, and translator
- Pål Refsdal (born 1963 in Kongsvinger), a freelance journalist, photographer, and filmmaker
- Roy Lønhøiden (born 1964 in Kongsvinger), a country music composer and singer-songwriter
- Levi Henriksen (born 1964 in Kongsvinger), a novelist, short story writer, and singer-songwriter
- Håvard Gimse (born 1966 in Kongsvinger), a classical pianist
- Hildegunn Øiseth (1966 in Kongsvinger), a jazz musician on trumpet, flugelhorn, and bukkehorn
- Runar Søgaard (born 1967 in Kongsvinger), a leadership trainer, life-coach, and motivational speaker
- Thomas Cappelen Malling (born 1970 in Kongsvinger), an author, and director
- Andreas Ulvo (born 1983 in Kongsvinger), a jazz pianist, organist, composer, and photographer
- Jóhanna Guðrún Jónsdóttir (born 1990), an Icelandic singer at the Eurovision Song Contest 2009 who is known by the stage name Yohanna, lives in Kongsvinger

=== Sport ===
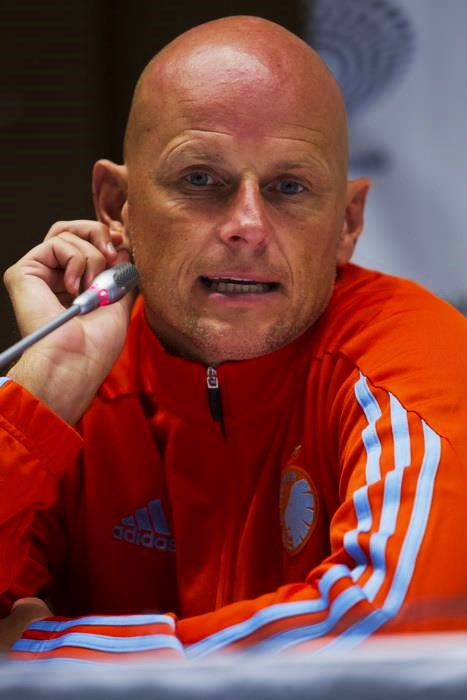
Ståle Solbakken, 2014

- Sverre Strandli (1925 in Brandval – 1985), a hammer thrower who competed at the 1952 Summer Olympics
- Bjørge Stensbøl (born 1947 in Kongsvinger), a former chief of top-level athletics Olympiatoppen
- Even Pellerud (born 1953 in Kongsvinger), a former football player with 180 club caps and coach
- Øivind Tomteberget (born 1953 in Kongsvinger), a retired football midfielder who played 660 games for Kongsvinger IL
- Espen Nystuen (born 1981 in Kongsvinger), a former footballer with over 300 club caps
- Lars Krogh Gerson (born 1990 in Luxembourg City, Luxembourg, grew up in Kongsvinger), a footballer playing for Luxembourg.
- Ole Christian Veiby (born 1996 in Kongsvinger), a rally driver

== Twin towns – sister cities ==
Kongsvinger has sister city agreements with the following places:

- Arvika, Värmland County, Sweden
- Ebel es Saqi, Marjayoun, Lebanon
- Skive, Denmark
- Ylöjärvi, Pirkanmaa, Finland

== In popular culture ==
Kongsvinger is referenced within the title (and indirectly within the lyrics) of the song "A Sentence Of Sorts In Kongsvinger" by the American rock band Of Montreal on the 2007 album Hissing Fauna, Are You the Destroyer?.
