= Cathrine Dahl =

First woman to train as a lawyer in Norway

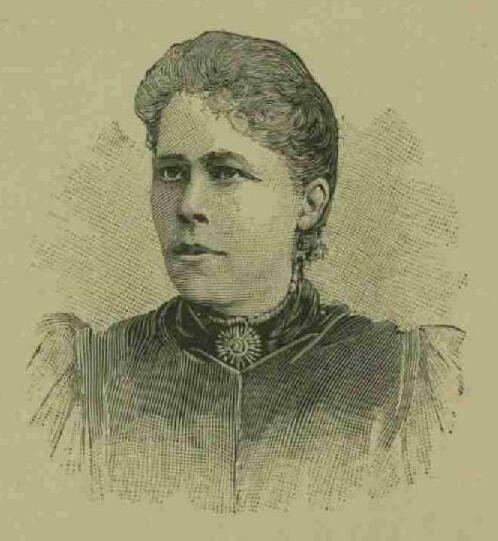
- Born: 17 August 1855; Kongsvinger Municipality
- Died: 6 June 1906 (aged 50); Christiania
- Occupation: Lawyer

Cathrine Dahl (born 17 August 1855 at Kongsvinger; died 6 June 1906 in Kristiania) was the first woman in Norway to take a legal education (1890). As no-one would hire a woman in a legal position, Cathrine Dahl was to teach in a primary school until her death.
