= Per Hjalmar Nakstad =

Norwegian professor of medicine (born 1946)

Per Hjalmar Nakstad (born 20 May 1946) is a Norwegian professor of medicine.

He was born in Kongsvinger and grew up in Kongsvinger Municipality, Målselv Municipality, and Stjørdal Municipality. He finished his secondary education at Trondheim Cathedral School in 1965, and graduated in medicine in Freiburg in 1971. From 1979 he got the specialist title in radiology, and in 1985 he took the dr.med. degree at the University of Oslo.

In 1992 he was hired as professor of neurology at the University of Oslo and chief physician in the department of neuroradiology, Ullevål University Hospital. He left in 1999 to become medical director in the private medical company Capio Diagnostikk. He returned to the University of Oslo as a professor of radiology and neuroradiology in 2002. He retired in 2013, at the age of 67. In 2014 he was decorated as a Knight, First Class of the Order of St. Olav.

He resided at Bjørnegård near Sandvika, in Bærum Municipality. He then moved to Vakås in Asker Municipality before moving back to Gjettum in Bærum Municipality. He is a widower with three children, but married for a second time.
