= Eli Wathne =

Norwegian politician (born 1970)

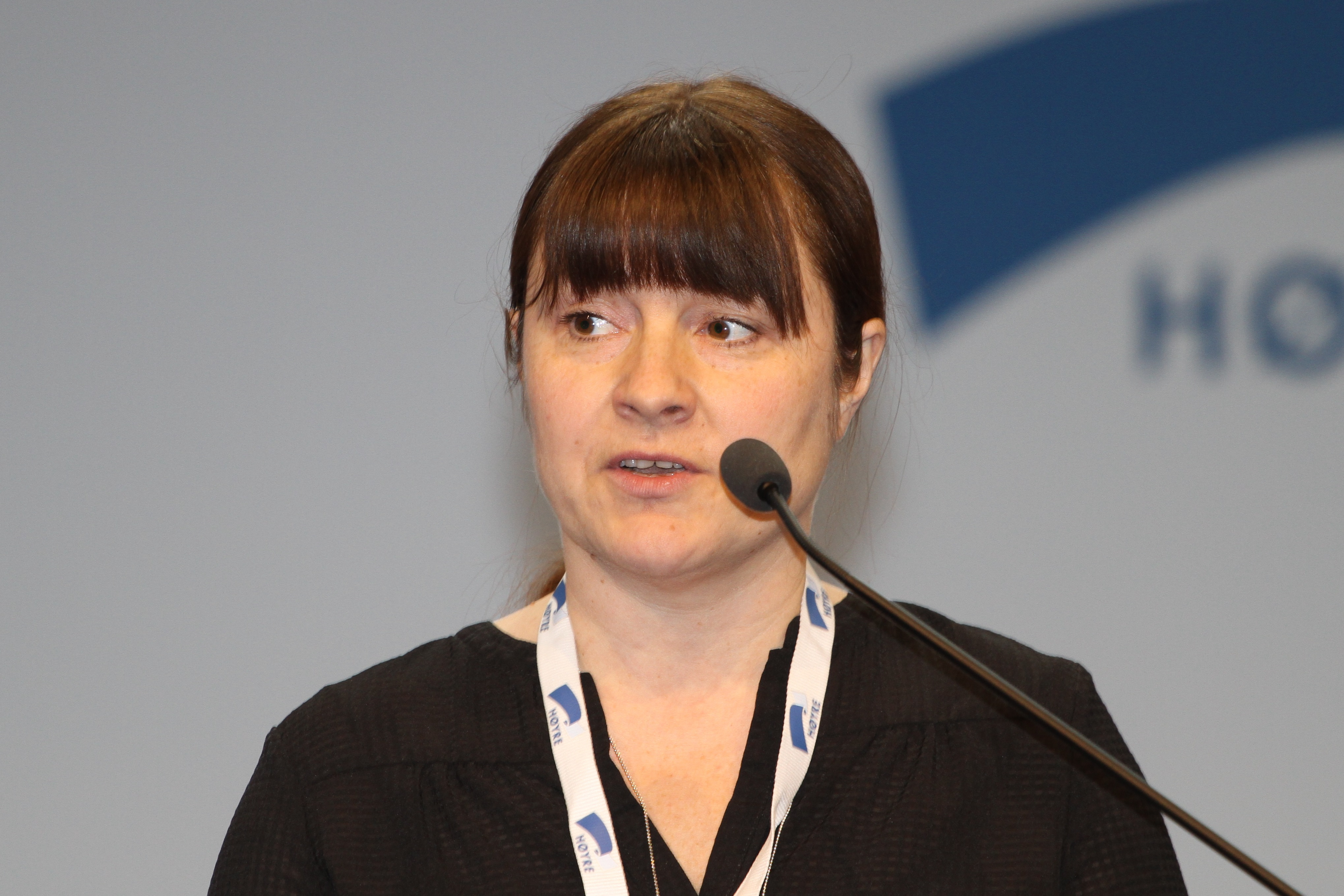
- Wathne in 2017

Deputy Member of the Parliament of Norway
- In office 2017–2021
- Constituency: Hedmark

Personal details
- Born: September 26, 1970 (age 56) Norway
- Party: Conservative Party

Eli Wathne (born 26 September 1970) is a Norwegian politician from the Conservative Party.

She served as a deputy representative to the Parliament of Norway from Hedmark during the term 2017–2021. Hailing from Kongsvinger Municipality, she is a board member of Kongsvinger IL Toppfotball.
