= Austmarka, Innlandet =

Village in Kongsvinger Municipality, Norway

Austmarka
- Village
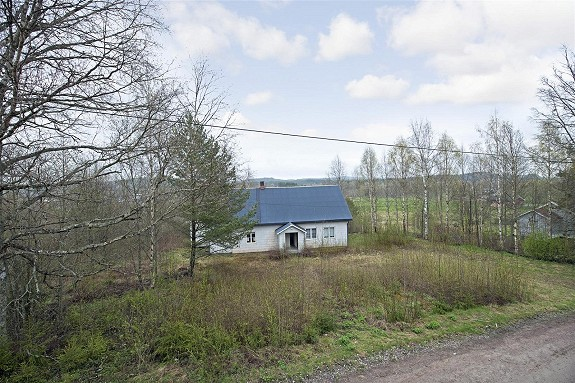
- View of the village area
- Interactive map of Austmarka
- Location within Innlandet Location within Norway
- Coordinates: 60.10025°N 12.32129°E
- Country: Norway
- Region: Eastern Norway
- County: Innlandet
- District: Vinger
- Municipality: Kongsvinger Municipality

Area
  - Total: 0.49 km^{2} (0.19 sq mi)
- Elevation: 180 m (590 ft)

Population (2024)
  - Total: 229
  - Density: 467/km^{2} (1,210/sq mi)
- Time zone: UTC+01:00 (CET)
  - Summer (DST): UTC+02:00 (CEST)
- Post Code: 2224 Austmarka

Austmarka is a village in Kongsvinger Municipality in Innlandet county, Norway. The village is located less than 10 kilometres (6.2 mi) from the border with Sweden and about 25 kilometres (16 mi) to the southeast of the town of Kongsvinger. Austmarka Church is located in the village.

The 0.49-square-kilometre (120-acre) village has a population (2024) of 467 and a population density of 467 inhabitants per square kilometre (1,210/sq mi).

Austmarka is located at the southern end of Finnskogen, a continuous forest area that stretches north along the Swedish border throughout Solør. Forest Finns began to settle in the area in the 17th century. Many people from Austmarka can find Finnish family names in their ancestors such as Porkka, Ampiainen, Valkoinen and Kartuinen.
