= Roy Lønhøiden =

- Born: 4 May 1964; Finnskogen, Kongsvinger, Norway
- Genres: Country, Folk
- Occupations: Musician, songwriter.
- Years active: 1994–present
- Formerly of: Peyton Place

Roy Lønhøiden (born in Kongsvinger, Norway, on 4 May 1964) is a Norwegian composer and singer-songwriter in the country music genre. His music is considered a blend of traditional Norwegian folk and American roots music.

== Biography ==
Lønhøiden was born in Finnskogen and grew up near Lake Vingersjøen by the district of Langeland in Kongsvinger Municipality. His mother and grandparents were in the Pentecostal church and would often perform for prisoners with her congregation.

He formed a group with Kristin Solli Schøien called Peyton Place in 1994 and they received an offer for a contract with Sony Music. Despite this, Lønhøiden decided to travel to the United States in 1995, where he lived with relatives and friends. He is influenced by Hank Williams, Johnny Cash, and Townes Van Zandt and although he returned to Norway after a year, he has been back to visit the US multiple times.

Lønhøiden then started a solo career, being nominated for Spellemannprisen (considered the Norwegian equivalent of a Grammy Award) for three of his albums, Sanger fra skogen (2006), Når dagen demrer blått (2008), and Du spør meg om sannhet (2015).

In 2015 he moved to Sweden.

In 2021 Lønhøiden was entangled in legal trouble when he tried to cross the Norwegian–Swedish border and inadvertently violated Norwegian COVID-19 regulations.

== Discography ==
=== Albums ===
Solo albums

- 2004: Det ensomme landet
- 2006: Sanger fra skogen
- 2008: Når dagen demrer blått
- 2012: Sanger fra veien
- 2015: "Du spør meg om sannhet"

Collaborative albums

- 1994: Peyton Place with Kristin Solli Schøien
- 1998: Kulseth & Lønhøiden Almenning with Stein and Bjørn Kulseth
- 2004: Fattige var de som først fikk se with Veronica Akselsen

Compilation albums

- 1995: Huset – 13 år på nåde
- 1998: Markens gang
- 2005: That´s Hillbilly
- 2005: Dansbare Takras og andre lekkerbiskener
- 2007: Pay Me My Money Down – The Bluegrass Album
- 2007: Cowboy & Indianer Sessions Vol. 1
- 2008: Norsk visesang i 50 år (3CD)

=== Video (DVD-VHS) ===
- 1992: Tell Me I'm Your Choice
- 1994: Song for the Roses with Peyton Place
- 2004: En fin kveld å leve
- 2006: Til jeg kan reise meg igjen

=== EPs ===
- 1994: Song for the Roses with Peyton Place

=== Singles ===
- 1994: "Fool for Love" with Peyton Place
- 1994: "Song for the Roses" with Peyton Place
- 2004: "Kjære vakre vene"
- 2008: "Vann og ved"
- 2012: "Veien til Savona"
