= Austmarka Church =

Church in Innlandet, Norway

- Austmarka kirke
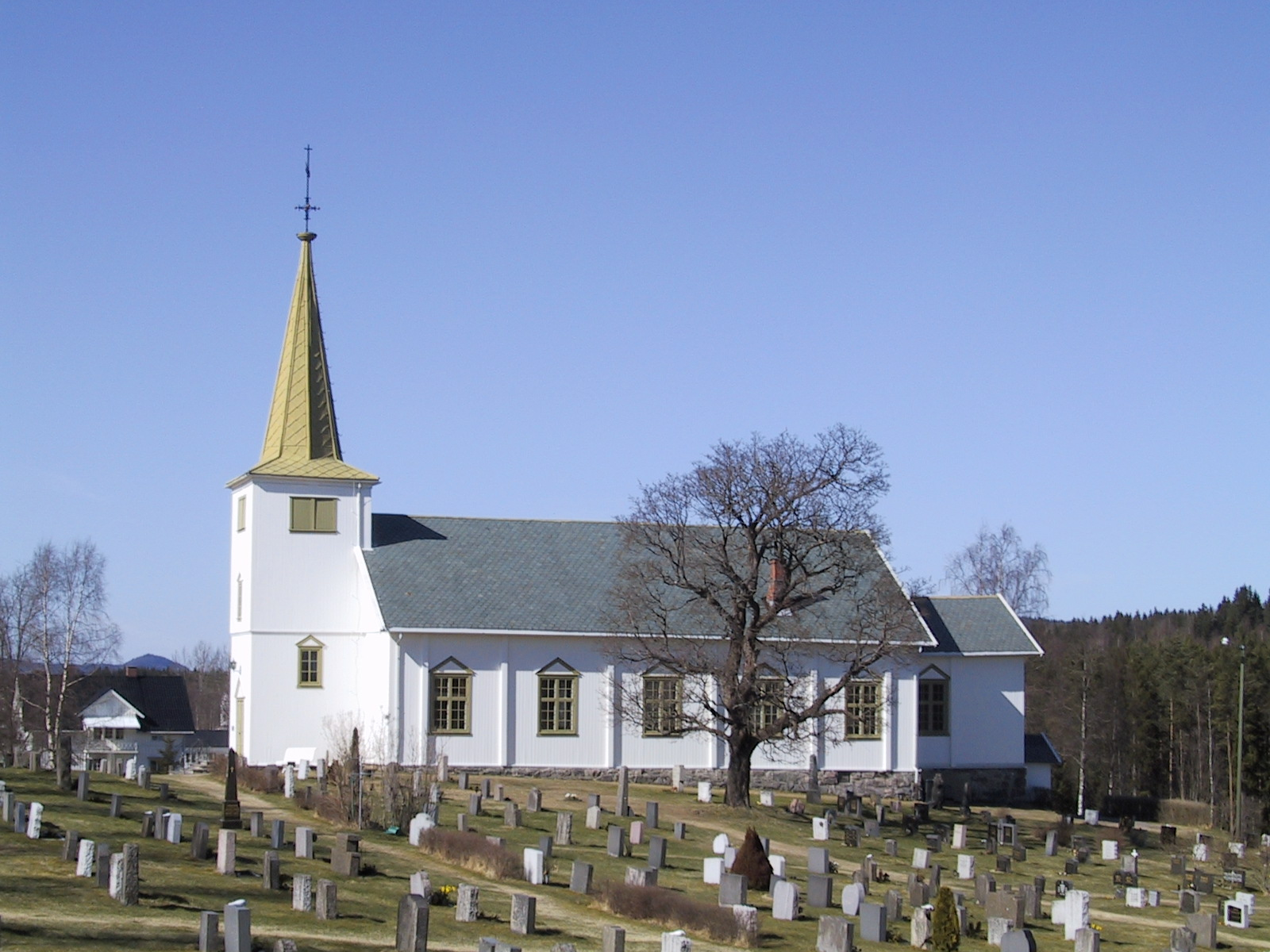
- View of the church
- Austmarka Church
- 60°06′06″N 12°19′30″E
- Location: Kongsvinger, Innlandet
- Country: Norway
- Denomination: Church of Norway
- Churchmanship: Evangelical Lutheran

History
- Status: Parish church
- Founded: 1858
- Consecrated: 14 April 1858

Architecture
- Functional status: Active
- Architect: Paul Bielenberg
- Architectural type: Long church
- Completed: 1858 (168 years ago)

Specifications
- Capacity: 380
- Materials: Wood

Administration
- Diocese: Hamar bispedømme
- Deanery: Solør, Vinger og Odal prosti
- Parish: Austmarka
- Norwegian Cultural Heritage Site
- Type: Church
- Status: Not protected
- ID: 83827

Austmarka Church (Norwegian: Austmarka kirke) is a parish church of the Church of Norway in Kongsvinger Municipality in Innlandet county, Norway. It is located in the village of Austmarka. It is the church for the Austmarka parish which is part of the Solør, Vinger og Odal prosti (deanery) in the Diocese of Hamar. The white, wooden church was built in a long church design in 1858 using plans drawn up by the architect Paul Bielenberg. The church seats about 380 people.

== History ==
In 1847, a cemetery was built in Austmarka so that the local residents didn't need to travel all the way to Vinger Church to bury their dead. Soon after, there was a push to build a church at the cemetery to serve the population in the eastern part of the municipality. Paul Bielenberg was hired to design and build the new church. It was a wooden long church with a church porch and tower on the west end and a choir on the east end. Construction took place during 1857–1858. The new building was consecrated on 14 April 1858.

After its construction, the church suffered from poor maintenance so much so that church authorities ordered the congregation to do something about it. It was urged repeatedly to maintain the building. At one point, the church was close to being demolished, but during the 1870s, the building was repaired. In the 1880s, it got exterior paneling and the interior was painted. There was a fire in the building in 1922, but the fire was extinguished before major damage was done. However, the roof had to be repaired afterwards. The church was refurbished during the 1950s and again in 2008.

== Media gallery ==
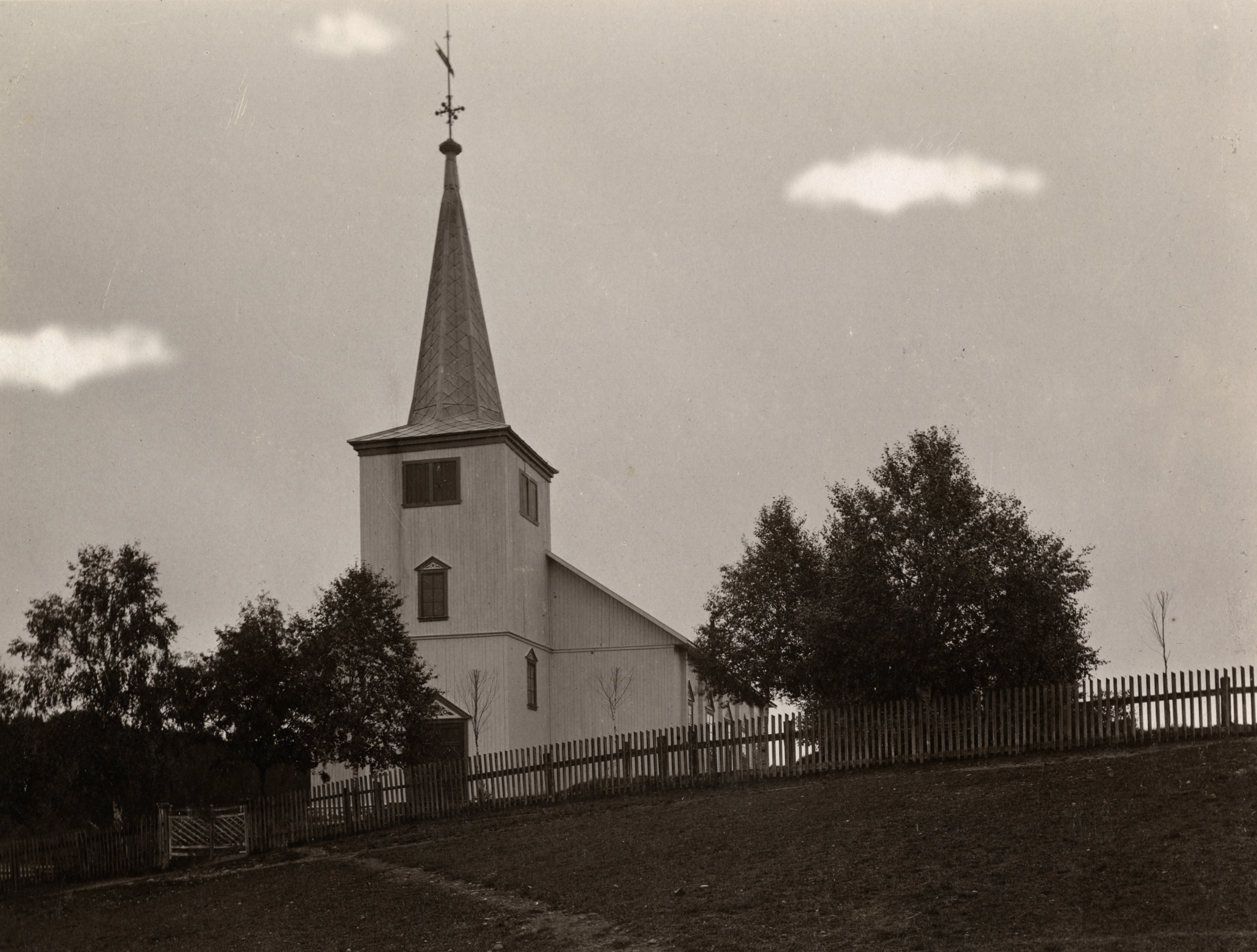

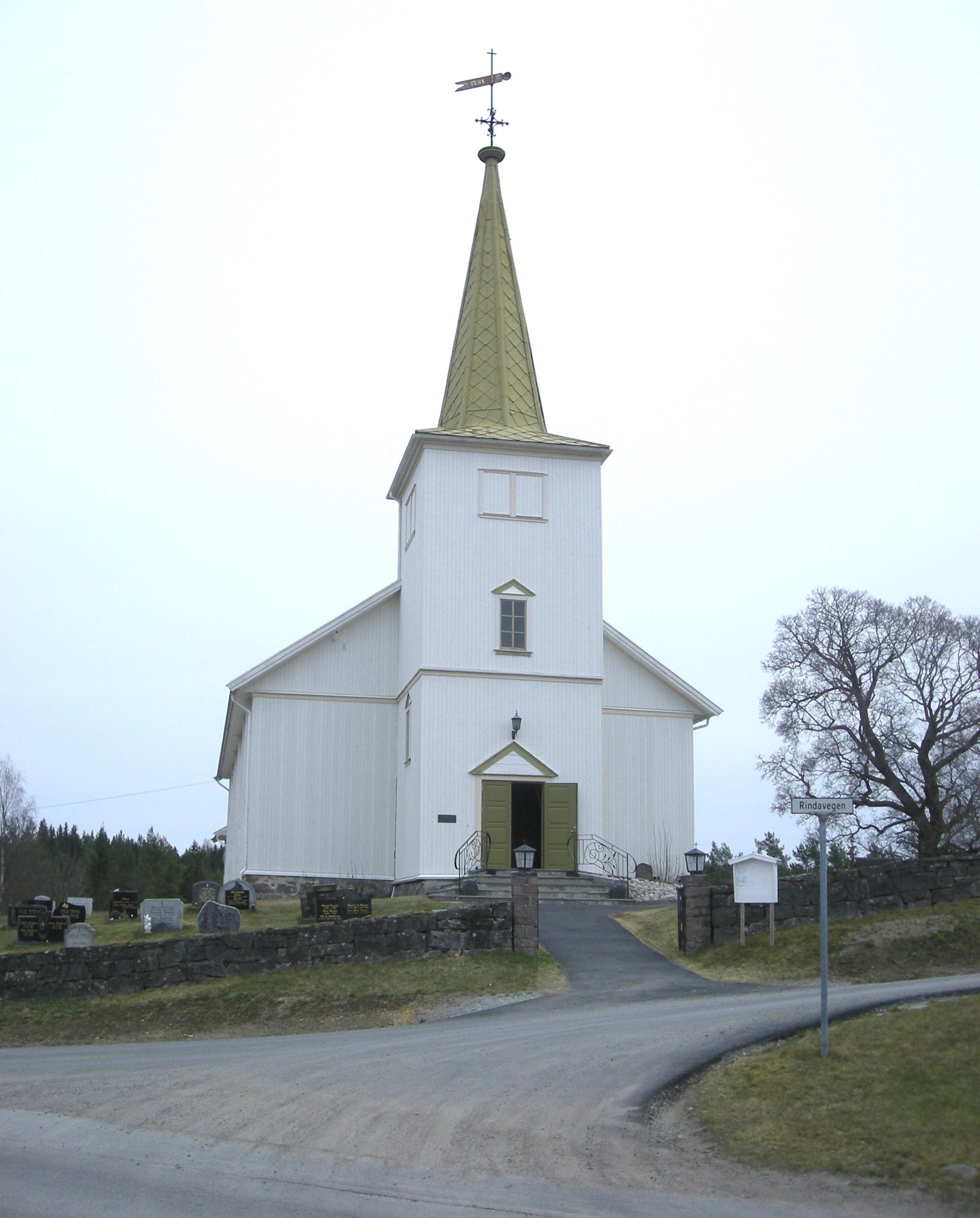

== See also ==
- List of churches in Hamar
