= Lundersæter =

Village in Kongsvinger Municipality, Norway

- Village
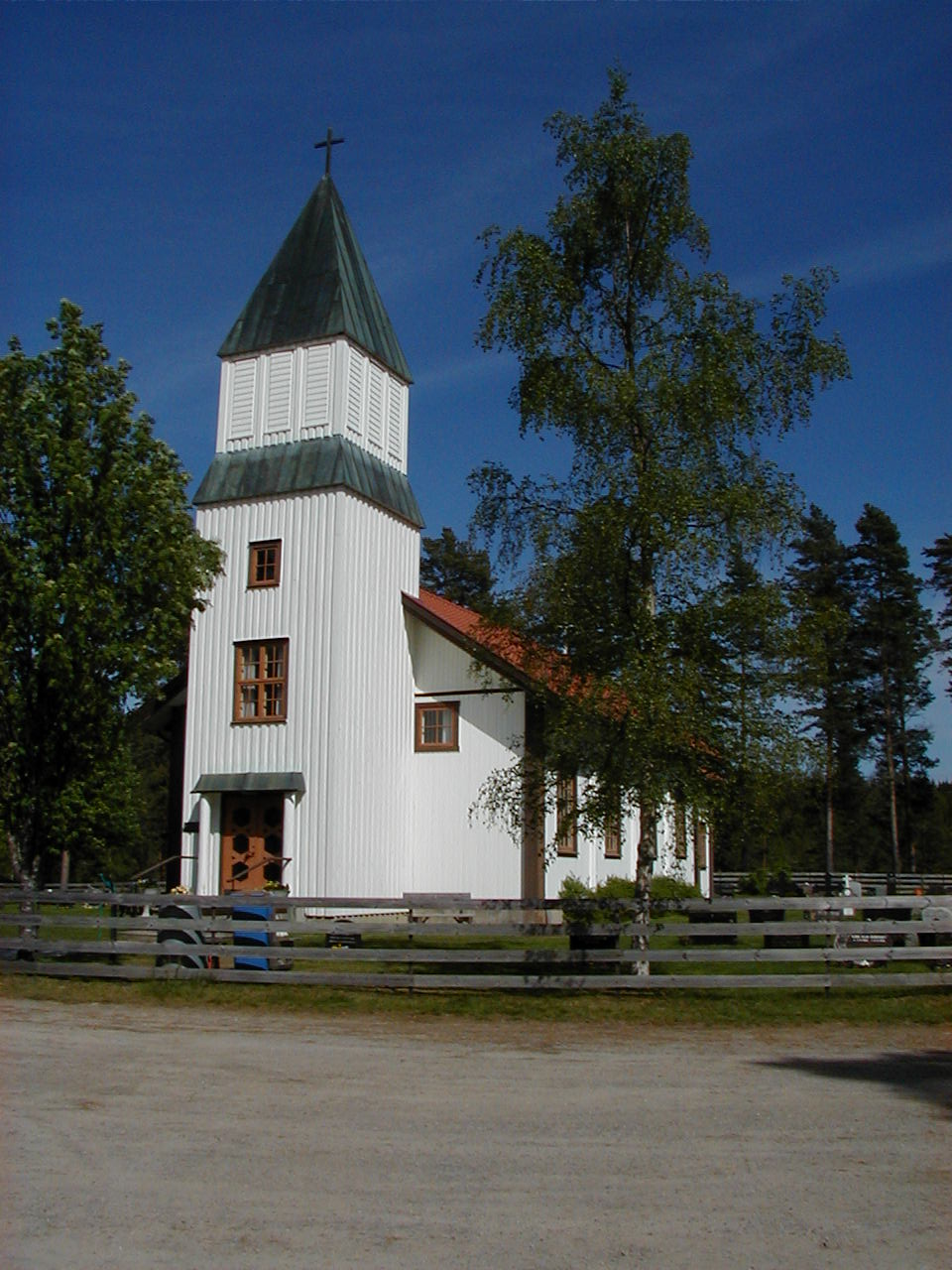
- View of the village church
- Interactive map of Lundersæter
- Location within Innlandet Location within Norway
- Coordinates: 60.29805°N 12.27592°E
- Country: Norway
- Region: Eastern Norway
- County: Innlandet
- District: Solør
- Municipality: Kongsvinger Municipality
- Elevation: 222 m (728 ft)
- Time zone: UTC+01:00 (CET)
  - Summer (DST): UTC+02:00 (CEST)
- Post Code: 2218 Lundersæter

Lundersæter is a village in Kongsvinger Municipality in Innlandet county, Norway. The village is located in the Finnskogen area, about 20 kilometres (12 mi) northeast of the town of Kongsvinger. Prior to 1964, this area was a part of Brandval Municipality. Lundersæter Church, a primary school, and a community centre are all located in the village.
