= Lundersæter Church =

Church in Innlandet, Norway

- Lundersæter kirke
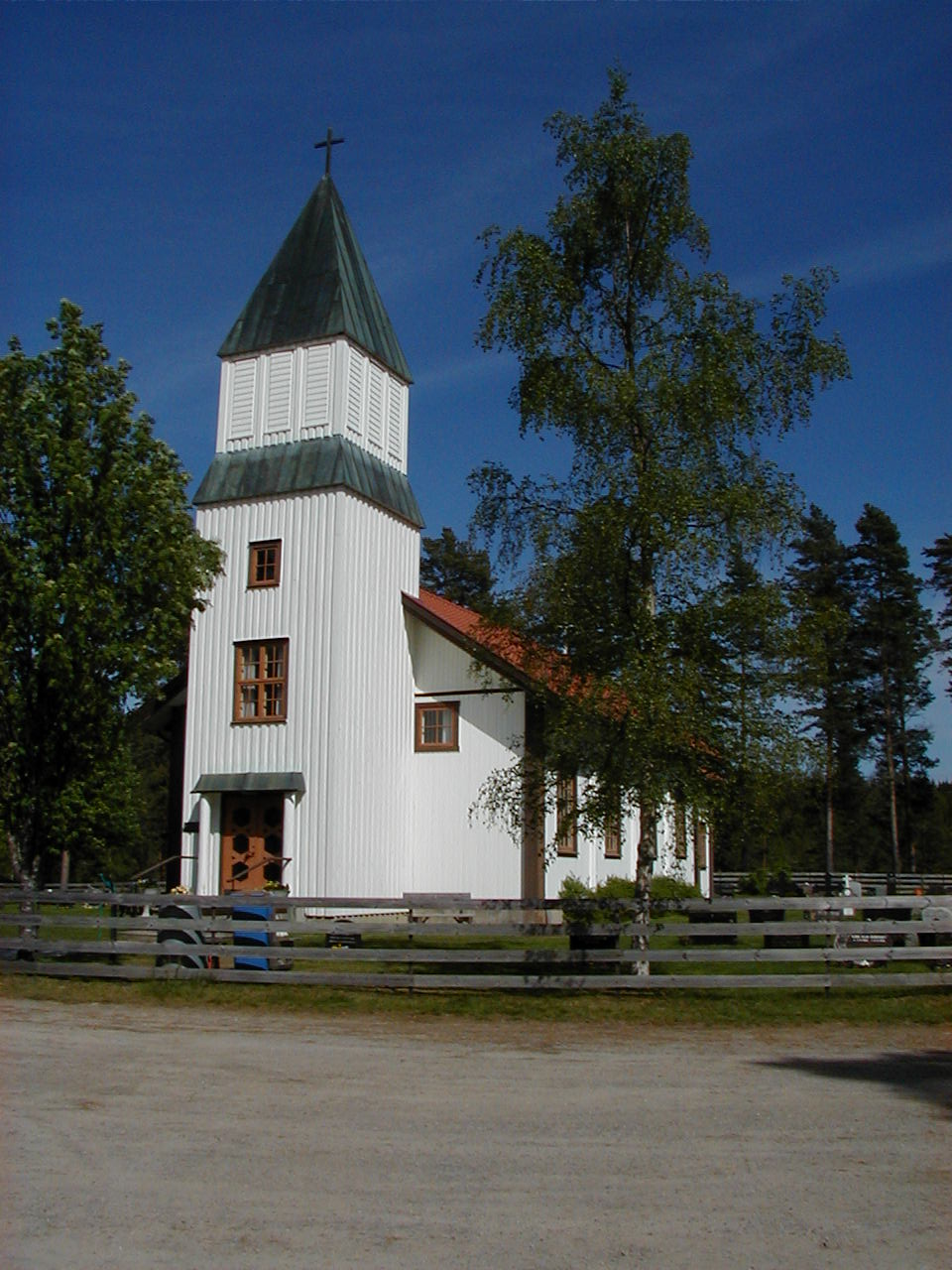
- View of the church
- Lundersæter Church
- 60°18′01″N 12°16′32″E
- Location: Kongsvinger, Innlandet
- Country: Norway
- Denomination: Church of Norway
- Churchmanship: Evangelical Lutheran

History
- Status: Parish church
- Founded: 1868
- Consecrated: 2 December 1868

Architecture
- Functional status: Active
- Architect: Ole Bergqvist
- Architectural type: Long church
- Completed: 1868 (158 years ago)

Specifications
- Capacity: 160
- Materials: Wood

Administration
- Diocese: Hamar bispedømme
- Deanery: Solør, Vinger og Odal prosti
- Parish: Brandval
- Norwegian Cultural Heritage Site
- Type: Church
- Status: Not protected
- ID: 84340

Lundersæter Church (Norwegian: Lundersæter kirke) is a parish church of the Church of Norway in Kongsvinger Municipality in Innlandet county, Norway. It is located in the village of Lundersæter. It is one of the churches for the Brandval parish which is part of the Solør, Vinger og Odal prosti (deanery) in the Diocese of Hamar. The white, wooden church was built in a long church design in 1868 using plans drawn up by the architect Ole Bergqvist. The church seats about 160 people.

== History ==
Planning for a new chapel in the Brandval Finnskog area began in the 1860s. Ole Bergqvist was hired to design and build the new chapel. It was a wooden long church building with a small tower on the roof of the nave. There was a small sacristy on the east end of the choir. It was constructed in 1868 and consecrated on 2 December 1868. In 1923, interior wall panels were added to cover up the log walls. In 1948–1949, electric lights and power were added into the building. In 1954, a large new tower and church porch were added on the west end of the nave. The old tower was removed at this time. Ola B. Aasness designed this addition to the building and Mentz Sæter was the lead builder for the project. In 1962–63, the chapel was thoroughly renovated inside and the nave got its current look both in terms of color and in terms of decor. Originally, the benches had been narrow and steep in the back, and there had been room for 250 people. The number of seats today is 160.

== Media gallery ==
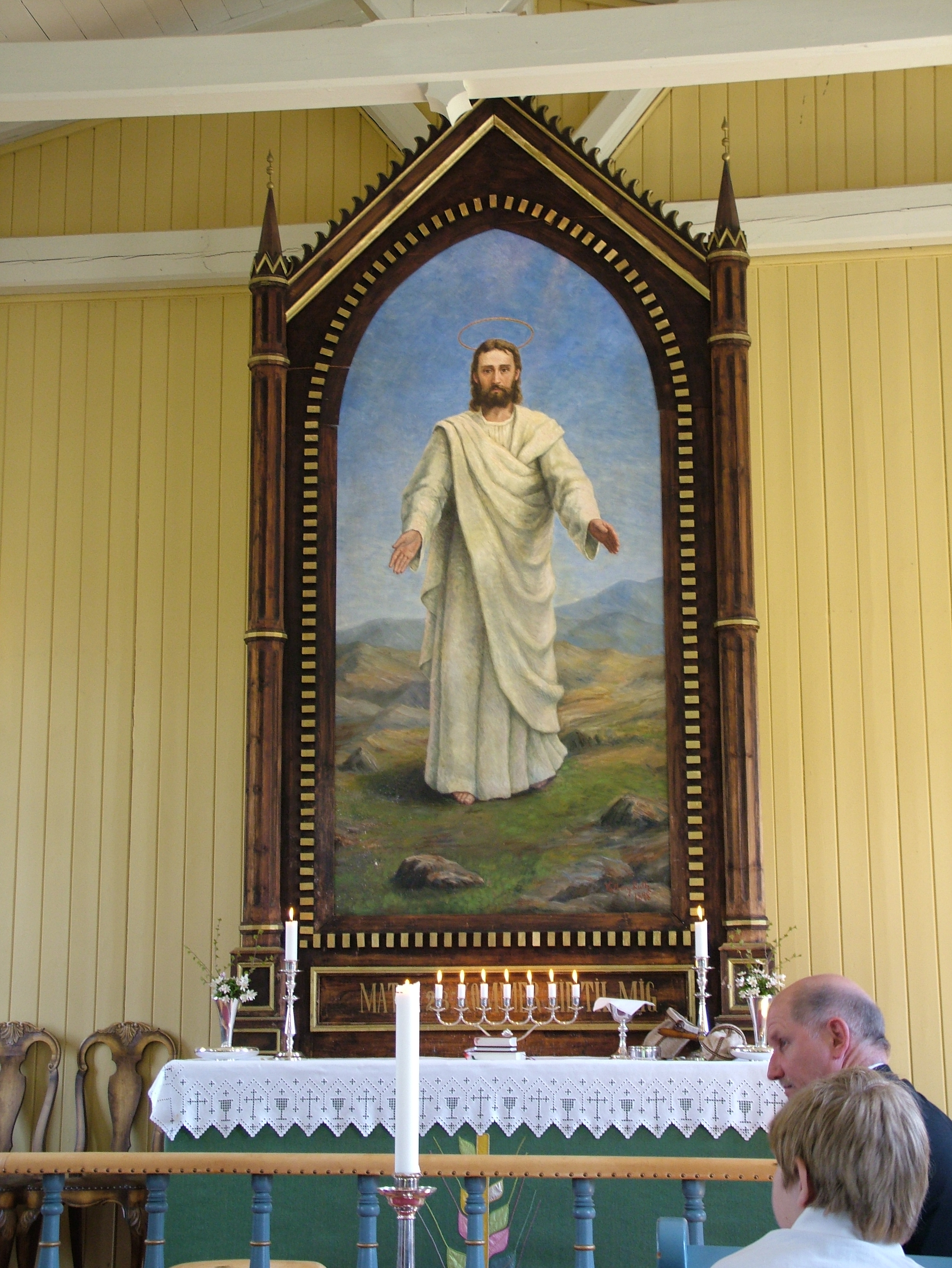
View of the interior altar.

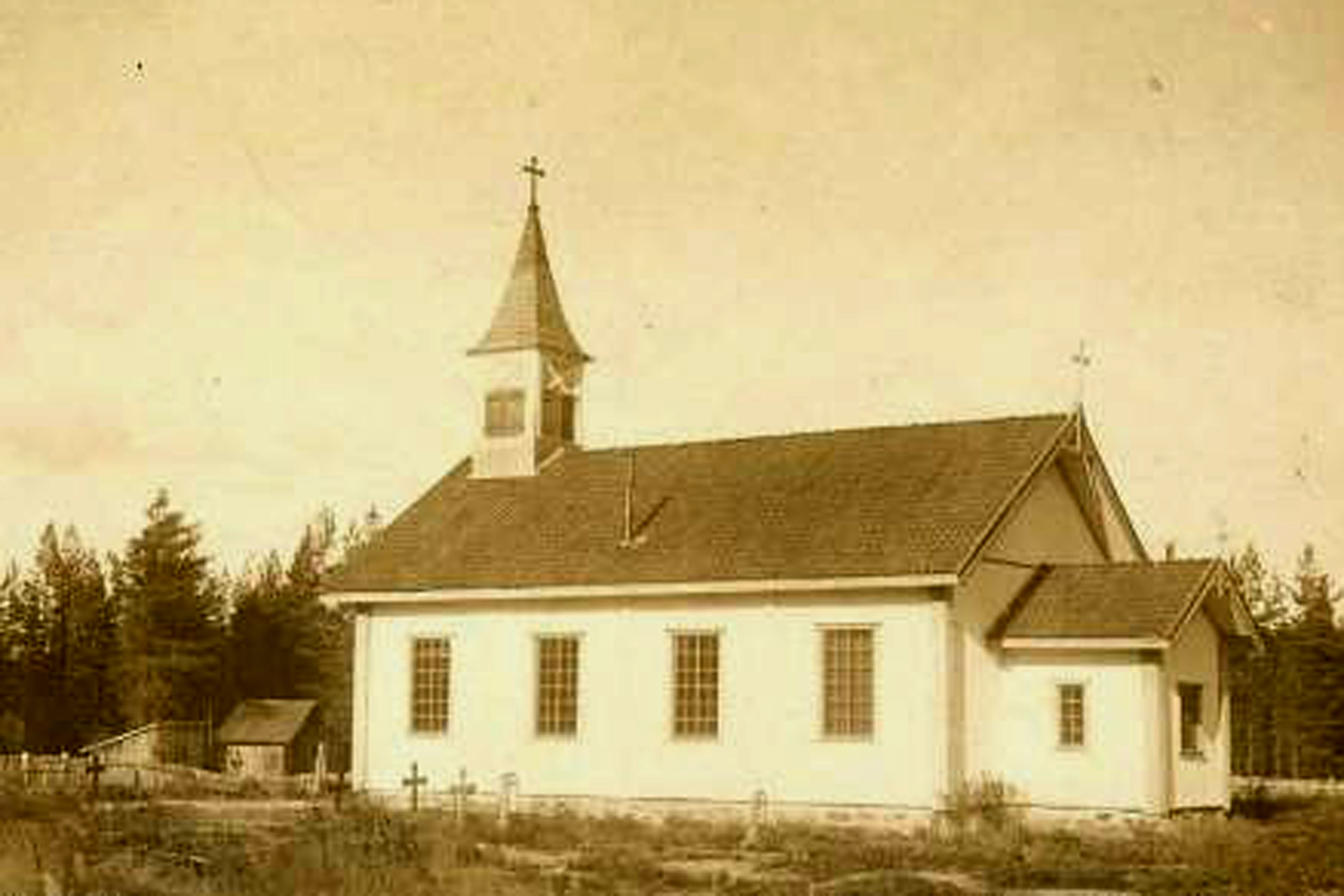
View of the church before the 1954 tower was built.

== See also ==
- List of churches in Hamar
