= Brandval (village) =

Village in Kongsvinger Municipality, Norway

- Village
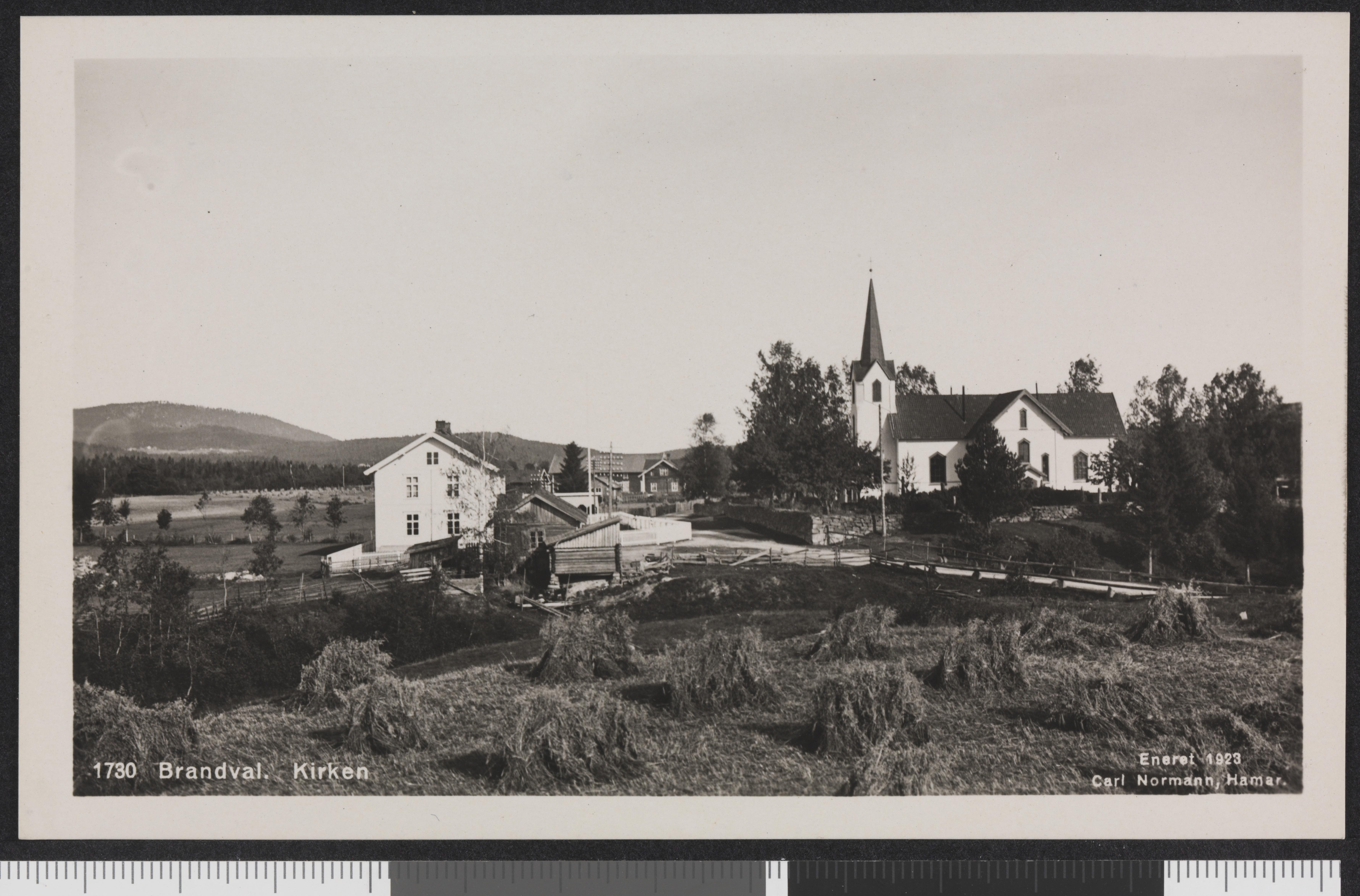
- View of the village (c. 1923)
- Interactive map of Brandval
- Location within Innlandet Location within Norway
- Coordinates: 60.31592°N 12.01838°E
- Country: Norway
- Region: Eastern Norway
- County: Innlandet
- District: Solør
- Municipality: Kongsvinger Municipality
- Elevation: 153 m (502 ft)
- Time zone: UTC+01:00 (CET)
  - Summer (DST): UTC+02:00 (CEST)
- Post Code: 2219 Brandval

Brandval is a village in Kongsvinger Municipality in Innlandet county, Norway. The village is located along the river Glomma, about 15 kilometres (9.3 mi) north of the town of Kongsvinger. The Norwegian National Road 2 and the Solørbanen railway line both run through the village. Brandval Church is located in the village.

The village has a sawmill and some businesses involving wood products and logging.

== History ==
This village was the administrative centre of the old Brandval Municipality which existed from 1866 until its dissolution in 1964.

== Sports ==
The local sports team Brandval Idrettslag won the Norwegian Women's Championship in 1967 and in 1970.
