= Bjørge Stensbøl =

Norwegian sports official

- Born: 30 November 1947 (age 77); Kongsvinger, Norway
- Occupation: Sports official

Bjørge Stensbøl (born 30 November 1947) is a Norwegian sports official.

He was born in Kongsvinger. He served as president of the Norwegian Biathlon Association from 1985 to 1988. From 1991 to 2004 he chaired Olympiatoppen, the elite sport department of the Norwegian Olympic and Paralympic Committee and Confederation of Sports.

He was decorated Knight, First Class of the Order of St. Olav in 2004.

He was awarded the Honor Prize at Idrettsgallaen 2025, shared with Johan Kaggestad (posthumously), Hans Trygve Kristiansen, and Dag Kaas (posthumously).
