= Brandval Church =

Church in Innlandet, Norway

- Brandval kirke
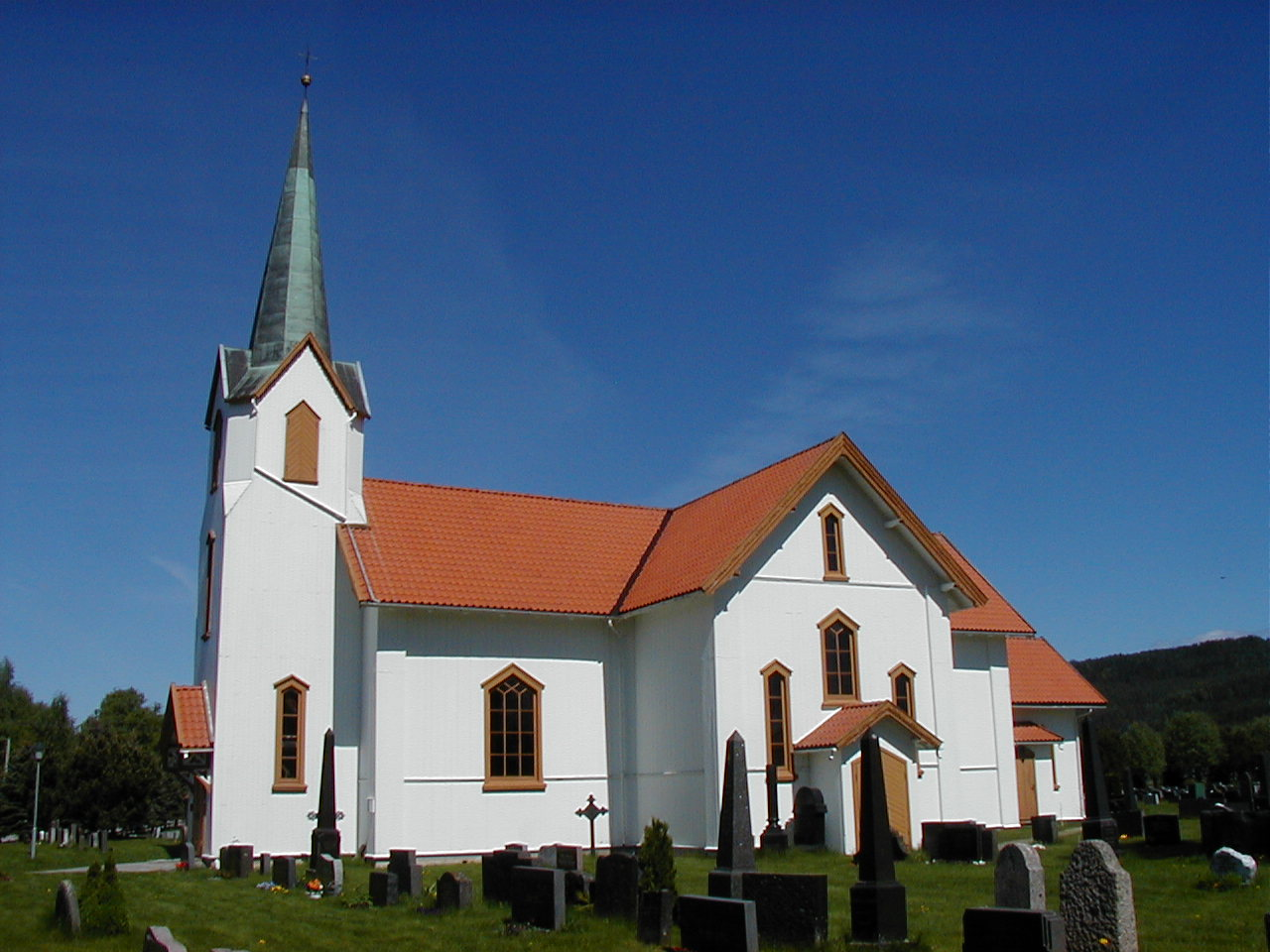
- View of the church
- Brandval Church
- 60°18′56″N 12°00′50″E
- Location: Kongsvinger, Innlandet
- Country: Norway
- Denomination: Church of Norway
- Previous denomination: Catholic Church
- Churchmanship: Evangelical Lutheran

History
- Status: Parish church
- Founded: 14th century
- Consecrated: 1651

Architecture
- Functional status: Active
- Architect: Erich Olsen
- Architectural type: Cruciform
- Style: Neo-Gothic
- Completed: 1651 (375 years ago)

Specifications
- Capacity: 330
- Materials: Wood

Administration
- Diocese: Hamar bispedømme
- Deanery: Solør, Vinger og Odal prosti
- Parish: Brandval
- Norwegian Cultural Heritage Site
- Type: Church
- Status: Automatically protected
- ID: 83941

Brandval Church (Norwegian: Brandval kirke) is a parish church of the Church of Norway in Kongsvinger Municipality in Innlandet county, Norway. It is located in the village of Brandval. It is one of the churches for the Brandval parish which is part of the Solør, Vinger og Odal prosti (deanery) in the Diocese of Hamar. The white, wooden, neo-Gothic church was built in a cruciform design in 1651 using plans drawn up by the architect Erich Olsen. The church seats about 330 people.

== History ==
The earliest existing historical records of the church date back to the year 1394, but it was not new that year. The first church in Brandval was a wooden stave church that was likely built during the 14th century. This church was located at Furulund on the west side of the river Glomma, about 1.2 kilometres (0.75 mi) north of the present church site which is on the east side of the river.

In 1651, the old church was torn down and a new church was built about 1.2 kilometres (0.75 mi) to the south on the other side of the river. The cruciform building was designed and built by Erich Olsen and Lauritz Lauritzen was in charge of the interior carpentry. The new building was consecrated in 1651.

The church was restored in 1839. In 1876–1877, the church was remodeled under the leadership of Günther Schüssler. A new church porch and tower was built on the west end of the nave and the old small tower on the roof of the nave was removed. Also, new interior furniture was installed including the pulpit and altarpiece. In 1966–1967, much of the old furniture that was removed in 1877 was reinstalled after getting it back from a museum.

== Inventory ==
The baroque pulpit and altarpiece date from 1651. They were made by Lauritz Lauritzen and painted by Thomas Blix in 1728. The baptismal font is from the Middle Ages.

== Media gallery ==
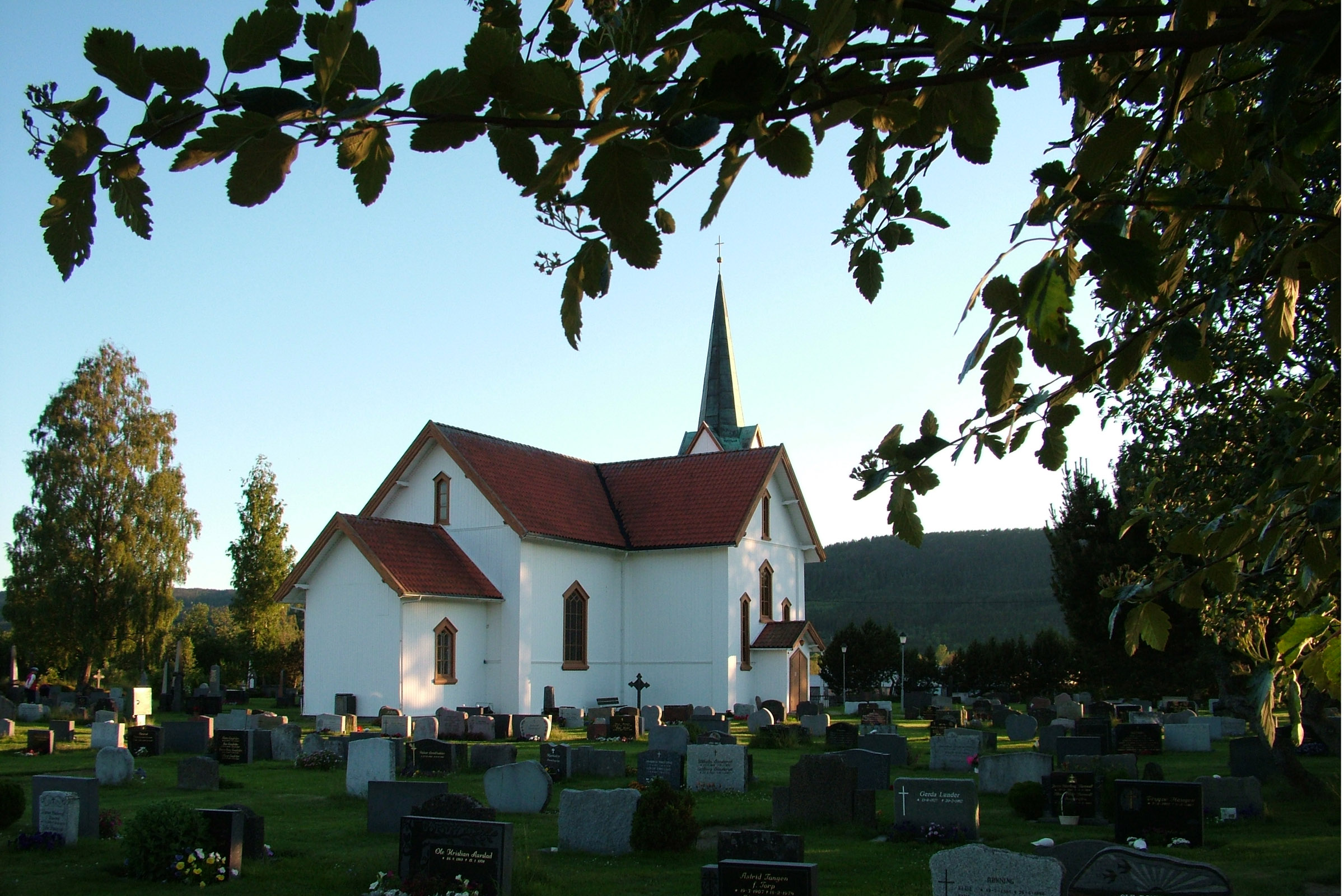
Exterior east side

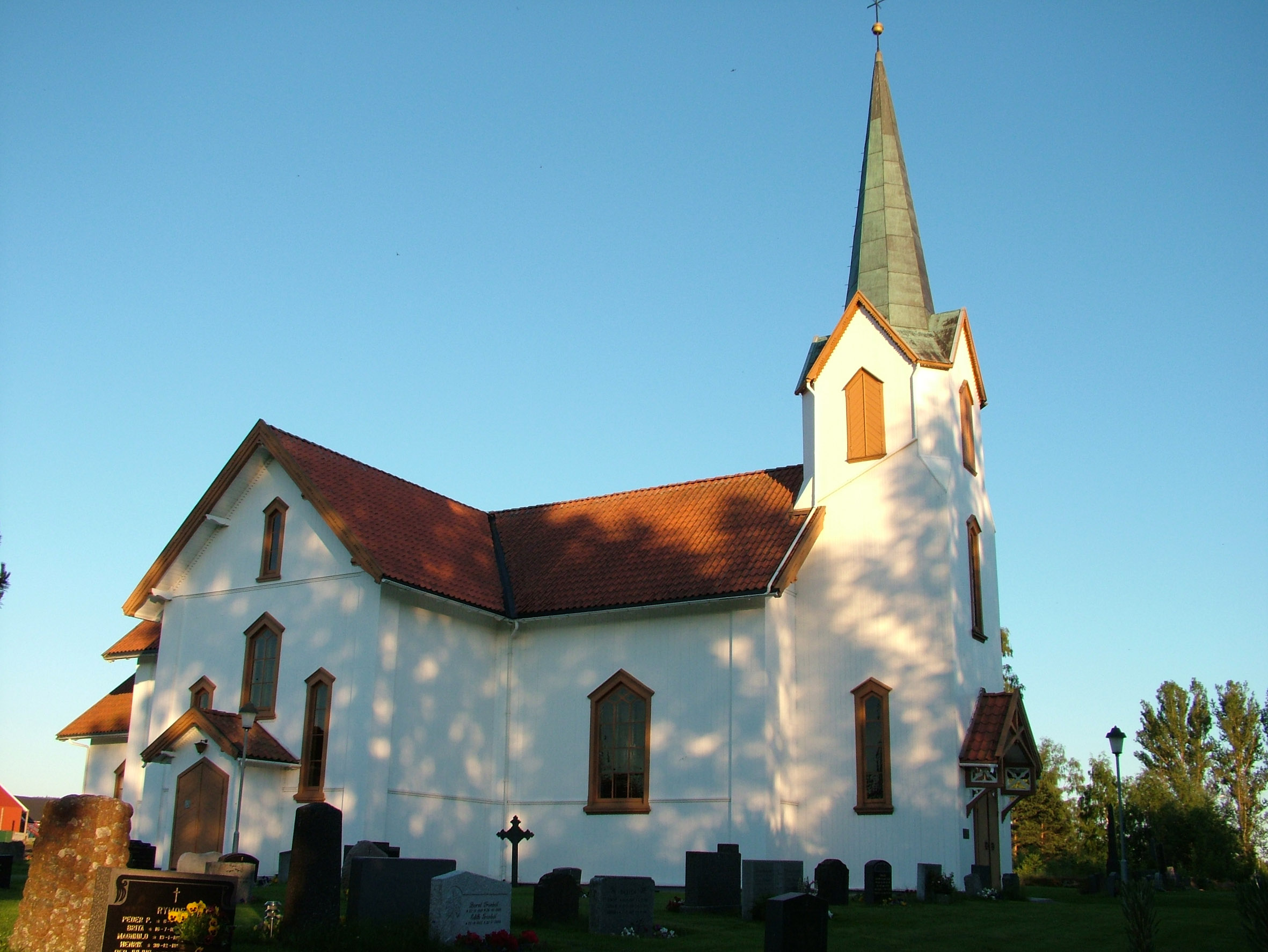
Exterior northwest side

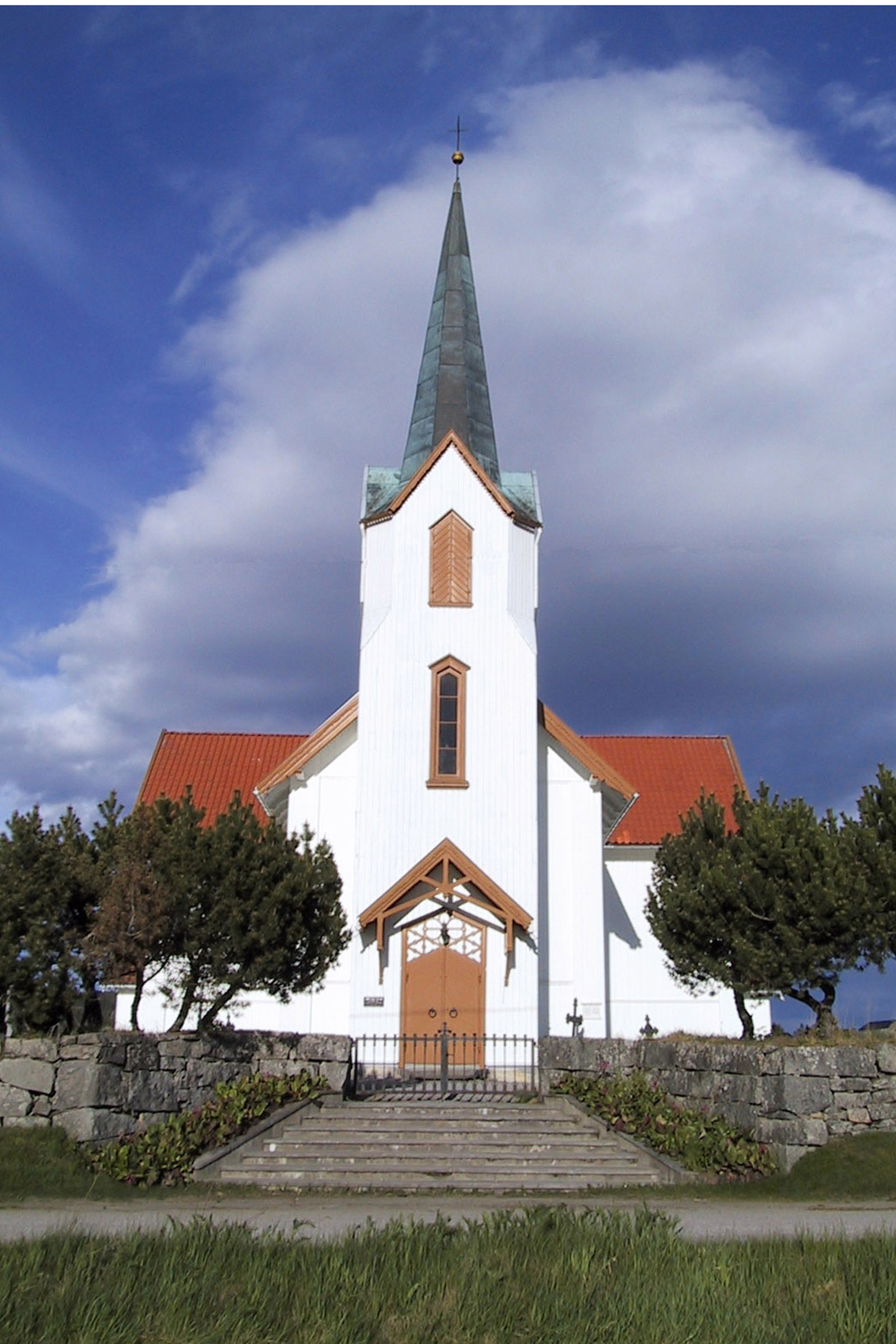
Exterior west side

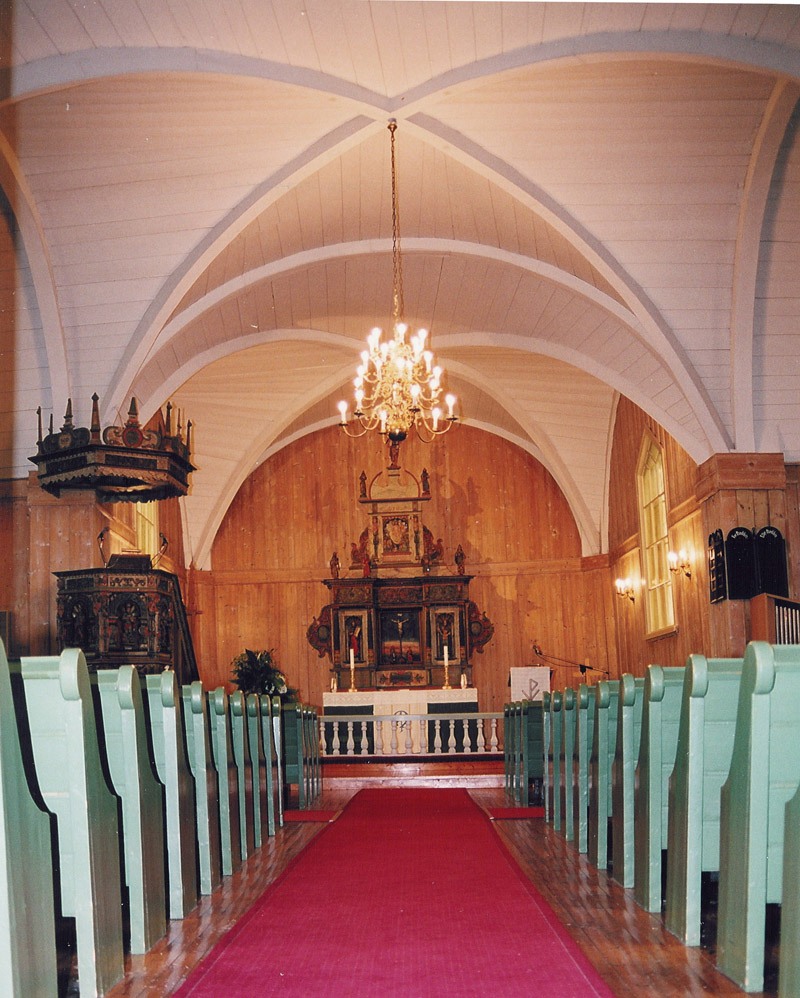
Interior view

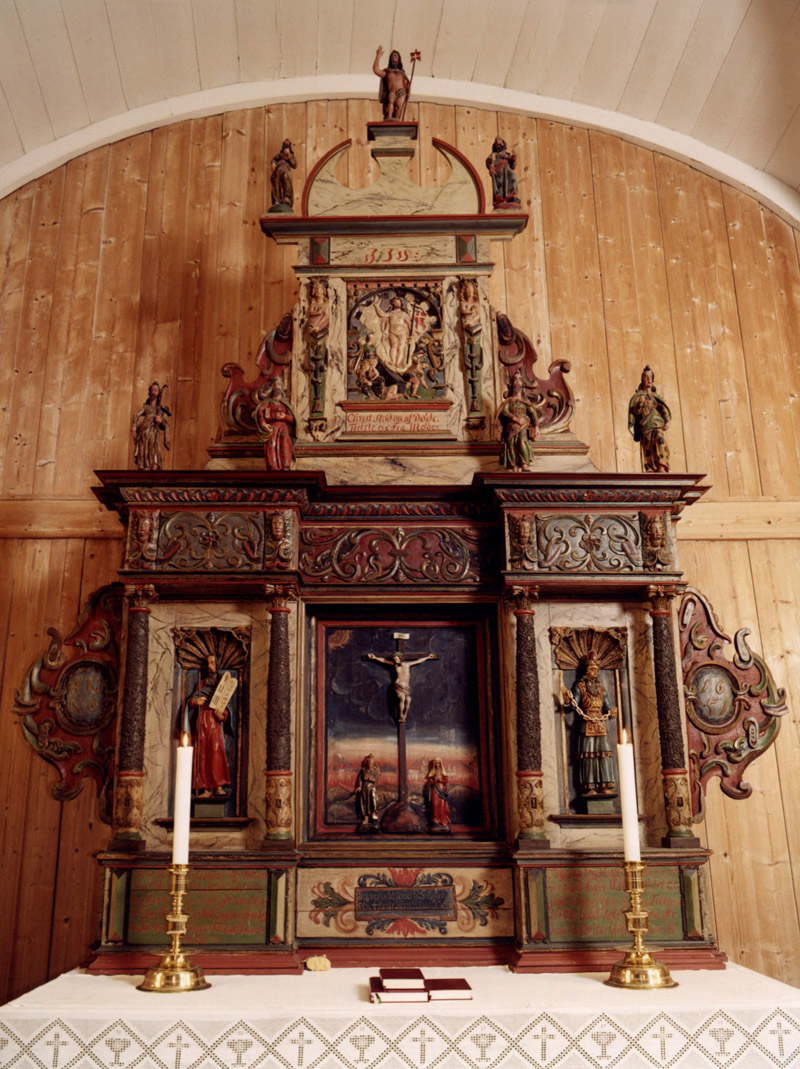
Altar

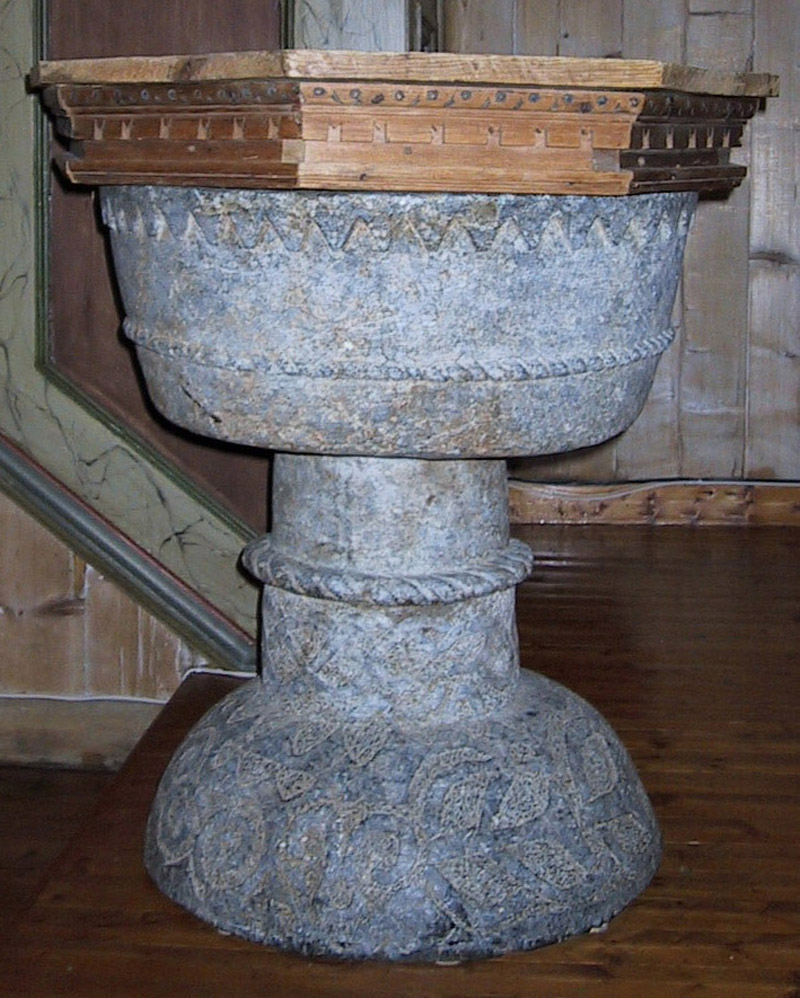
Baptismal font

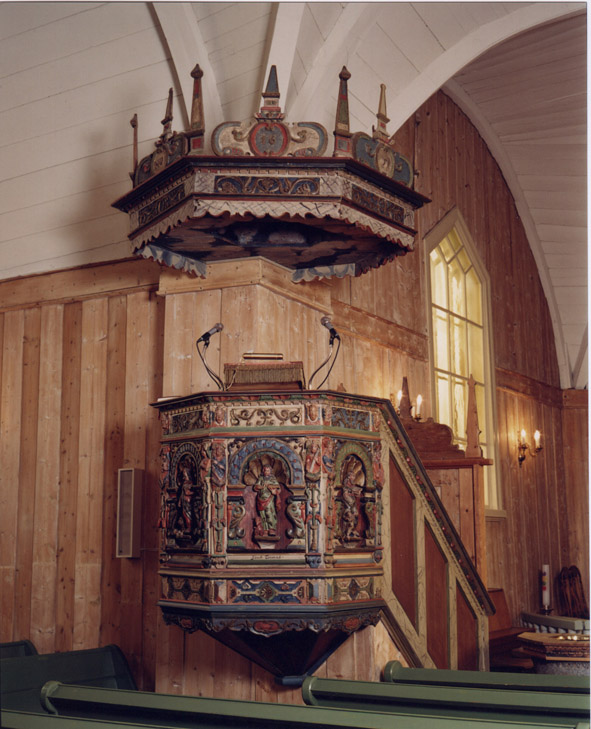
Pulpit

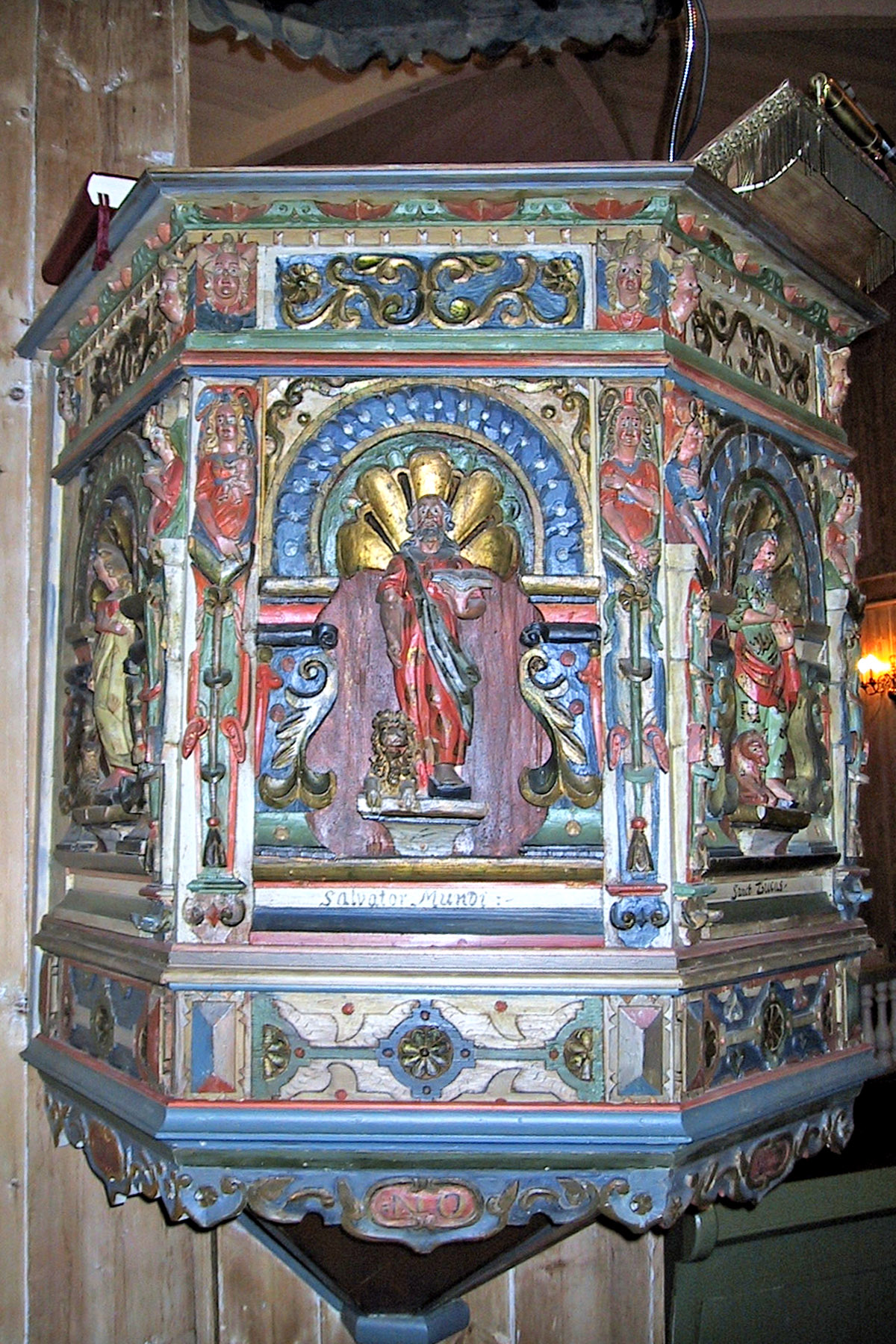
Pulpit detail

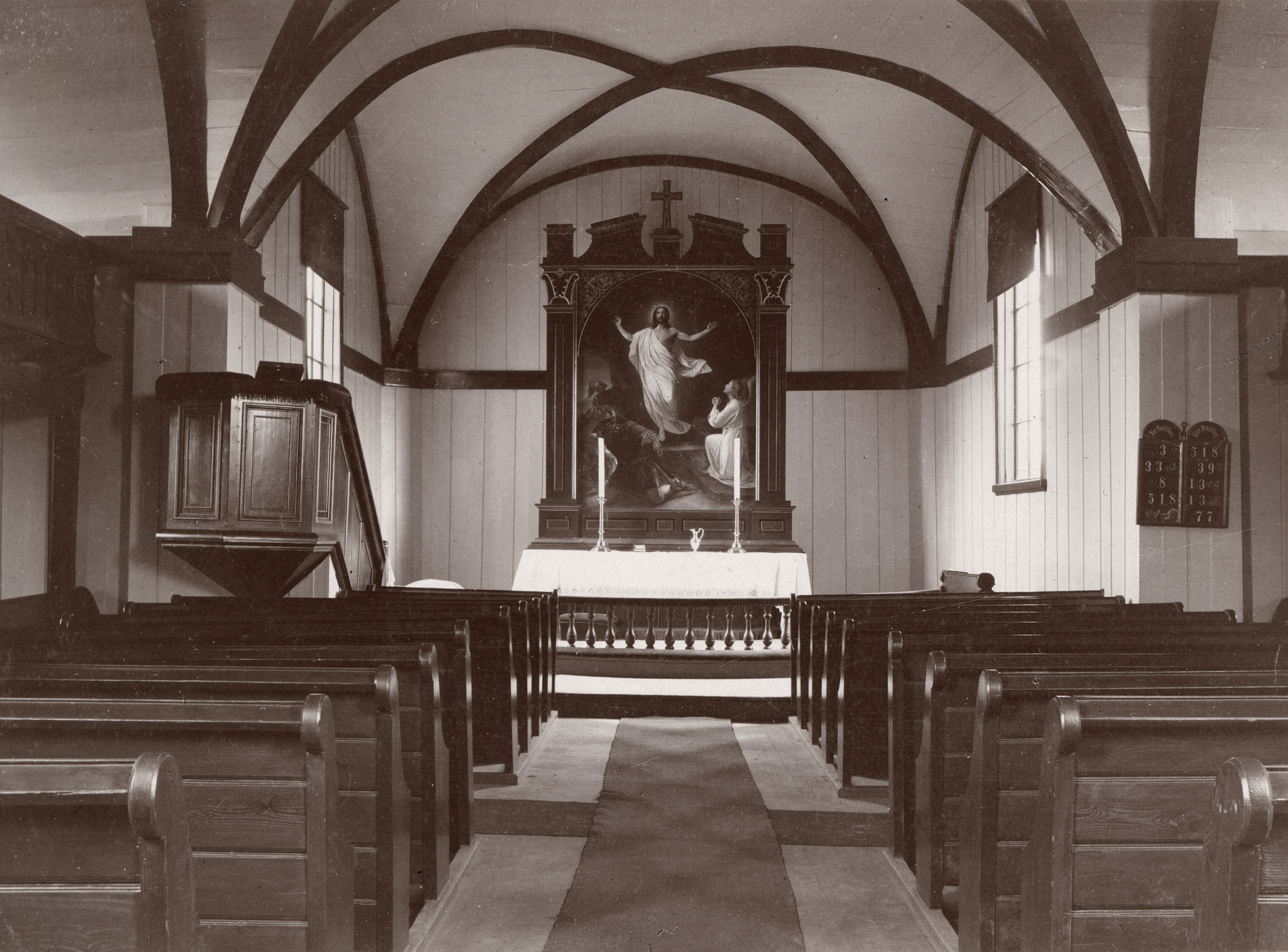
Interior view (1877–1967)

== See also ==
- List of churches in Hamar
