= Vinger (disambiguation) =

Vinger may refer to:

== Places ==
- Vinger, a traditional district in Innlandet county, Norway
- Vinger Municipality, a former municipality in the old Hedmark county, Norway
- Kongsvinger (town), sometimes locally called Vinger, a town in Innlandet county, Norway
- Vinger Royal Road, a historic road in Vinger, Norway
- Vinger Church, a church in Kongsvinger municipality in Innlandet county, Norway

== Other ==
- Singer Vinger, an Estonian punk rock band
