= Vinger =

Traditional district near Kongsvinger, Norway

- District
- Location within Norway
- Coordinates: 60.19488°N 12.01049°E
- Country: Norway
- County: Innlandet
- Region: Eastern Norway

Area
  - Total: 1,677 km^{2} (647 sq mi)

Population (2021)
  - Total: 23,950
  - Density: 14.28/km^{2} (36.99/sq mi)
- Demonym: Vingersokning

Vinger is a traditional district in Innlandet county, Norway. The 1,677-square-kilometre (647 sq mi) district encompasses the lands that make up Kongsvinger Municipality and Eidskog Municipality. It is generally located to the south and east of the town of Kongsvinger and the river Glomma. The main church for the region historically was Vinger Church. The area was once part of Vinger Municipality and it is also included in the Solør, Vinger og Odal prosti which is a deanery within the Church of Norway. This area was also once part of the jurisdictional area of the Vinger og Odal District Court.

== History ==
Vinger was mentioned as far back as the 1260s when it was written about in the book Hákonar saga Hákonarsonar. The book says that the king fought against the Ribbungene at the river Glomma and the old Hov Church. Finally, the Ribbungene were chased away towards the lake Vingersjøen and onwards towards Eidskog.

During the Viking Age, there was a lot of traffic in the area with several main roads passing through Vinger. The road from Vingulmark to Sweden was called Eskoleia, and it went from southern Odal through Vinger and on to Värmland. After the Christianization of Norway, many pilgrims made a pilgrimage through Vinger on their way north through the Østerdalen valley to the Nidaros Cathedral.

When the fortress on Tråstadberget was built in 1682, it got its name from the area. The new fortress was named Königs Winger or Kongens Vinger (later it was spelled Kongsvinger. Eventually, the village on the south side of the fortress got the same name and it became the town of Kongsvinger. In 1838, municipal governments were established in Norway, and all of the Vinger region was included in the new Vinger Municipality. On 7 February 1855, the town of Kongsvinger was separated from Vinger Municipality as its own municipality. Later, in 1864, the southern part of Vinger was separated to become Eidskog Municipality.

=== Etymology ===
The whole region was historically called Vinger (Old Norse: Vingr). This name could be related to the river Glomma which flows through the region. One could compare this to the English word swing (for the missing s see Indo-European s-mobile). The river Glomma passes through the center of the district where the south-flowing river takes a sharp northwestward turn. This can be compared to the similar Lithuanian word vìngis which means "bend", "bow", or "turn".

== Climate ==
Vinger has a subarctic climate (Dfc). September averages 9.7 °C (49.5 °F), falling just short of being the 4th month over 10 °C (50 °F) which would meet the requirements to move the area to the humid continental climate (Dfb) category.

Climate data for Vinger 1961-1990, extremes 1944-2004
Month	Jan	Feb	Mar	Apr	May	Jun	Jul	Aug	Sep	Oct	Nov	Dec	Year
Record high °C (°F)	10.0 (50.0)	10.5 (50.9)	16.5 (61.7)	25.0 (77.0)	27.5 (81.5)	32.2 (90.0)	31.6 (88.9)	32.8 (91.0)	26.0 (78.8)	20.5 (68.9)	13.0 (55.4)	10.7 (51.3)	32.8 (91.0)
Mean daily maximum °C (°F)	−4.3 (24.3)	−3.1 (26.4)	2.7 (36.9)	8.1 (46.6)	15.2 (59.4)	20.0 (68.0)	20.9 (69.6)	19.5 (67.1)	14.3 (57.7)	8.4 (47.1)	1.3 (34.3)	−2.9 (26.8)	8.3 (47.0)
Mean daily minimum °C (°F)	−10.9 (12.4)	−10.7 (12.7)	−6.2 (20.8)	−1.7 (28.9)	3.5 (38.3)	7.9 (46.2)	9.5 (49.1)	8.5 (47.3)	5.0 (41.0)	1.7 (35.1)	−4.2 (24.4)	−9.4 (15.1)	−0.6 (30.9)
Record low °C (°F)	−34.0 (−29.2)	−36.0 (−32.8)	−30.0 (−22.0)	−17.0 (1.4)	−6.2 (20.8)	−3.4 (25.9)	1.5 (34.7)	−1.8 (28.8)	−5.8 (21.6)	−15.5 (4.1)	−23.0 (−9.4)	−32.0 (−25.6)	−36.0 (−32.8)
Average precipitation mm (inches)	35 (1.4)	29 (1.1)	31 (1.2)	36 (1.4)	52 (2.0)	68 (2.7)	77 (3.0)	80 (3.1)	79 (3.1)	75 (3.0)	61 (2.4)	41 (1.6)	664 (26)
Average precipitation days	9.0	7.2	7.6	7.2	9.3	10.1	11.5	11.3	11.3	11.0	10.8	9.4	115.7
Source: Met Norway Eklima

== See also ==
- Solør
- Glåmdal
