= Glåmdal District Court =

Former district court in Innlandet, Norway

- Glåmdal tingrett
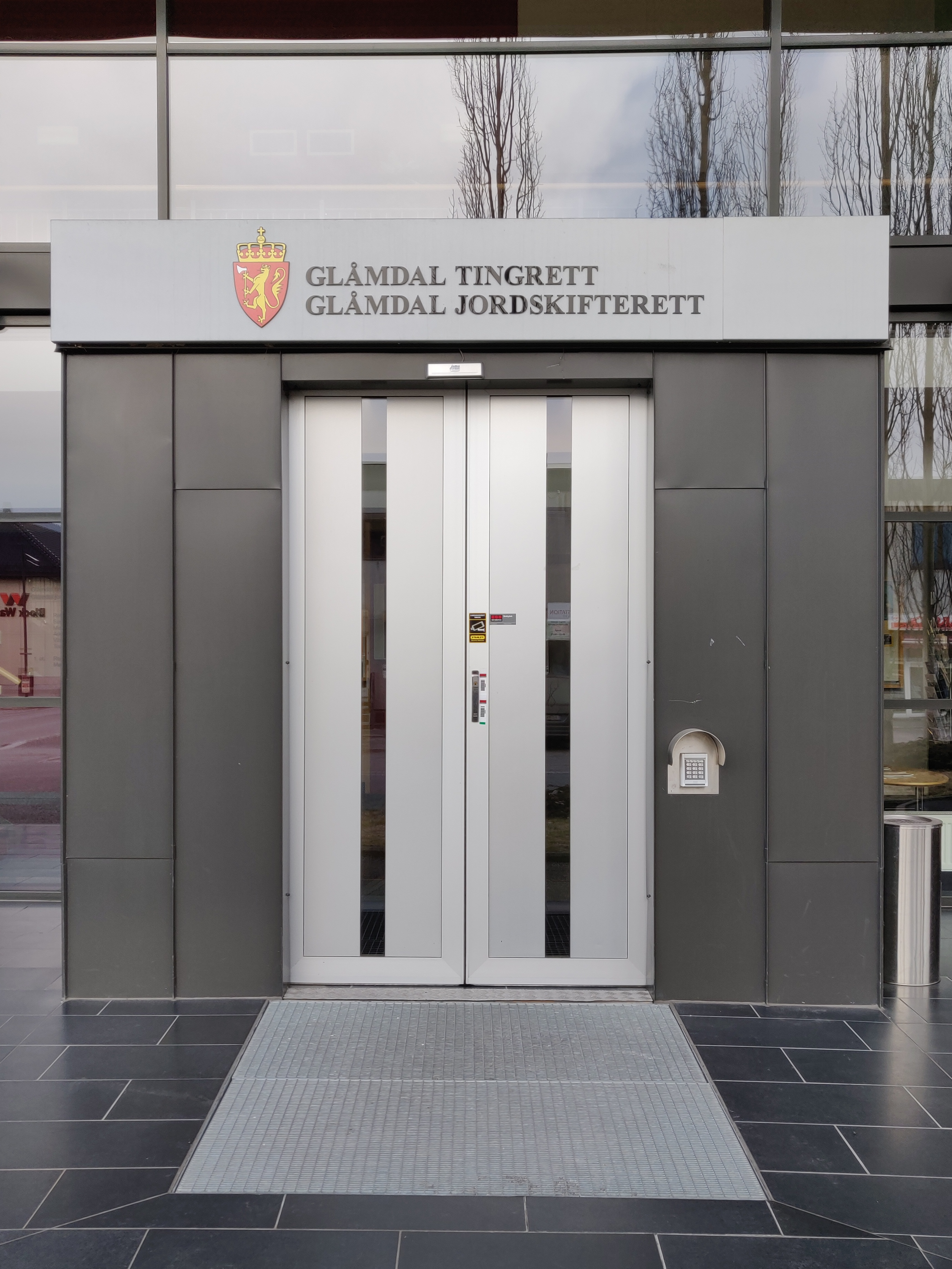
- Entrance to Glåmdal District Court in Kongsvinger
- Interactive map of Glåmdal District Court
- 60°11′09″N 12°00′20″E
- Established: 1 April 2006
- Dissolved: 26 April 2021
- Jurisdiction: Glåmdal
- Location: Kongsvinger, Norway
- Coordinates: 60°11′09″N 12°00′20″E
- Appeals to: Eidsivating; Court of Appeal

Division map
- Hedmark county and its court districts; Glåmdal was in green.

Glåmdal District Court (Norwegian: Glåmdal tingrett) was a district court in Innlandet county, Norway. The court existed from 2006 until 2021. It served the Glåmdal area which included the municipalities of Kongsvinger, Eidskog, Sør-Odal, Nord-Odal, and Grue. The court was based in the town of Kongsvinger. Cases from this court could be appealed to Eidsivating Court of Appeal in Hamar.

The court was a court of first instance. Its judicial duties were mainly to settle criminal cases and to resolve civil litigation as well as bankruptcy. The administration and registration tasks of the court included death registration, issuing certain certificates, performing duties of a notary public, and officiating civil wedding ceremonies. Cases from this court were heard by a combination of professional judges and lay judges.

== History ==
In 1847, the old Solør og Odalen District Court was split in two: the new Solør District Court served the Solør area and the new Vinger og Odal District Court served the municipalities of Kongsvinger and Eidskog (which were in Vinger) and the municipalities of Sør-Odal and Nord-Odal (which were in Odal). On 1 April 2006, the old Solør District Court was dissolved and Grue Municipality was transferred to the Vinger og Odal District Court and the newly merged court was renamed Glåmdal District Court. On 26 April 2021, the court was merged with the Nedre Romerike District Court and the Øvre Romerike District Court to create the new Romerike og Glåmdal District Court.
