= Vinger Municipality =

Former municipality in Hedmark, Norway

Vinger Municipality Vinger herred
- Former municipality
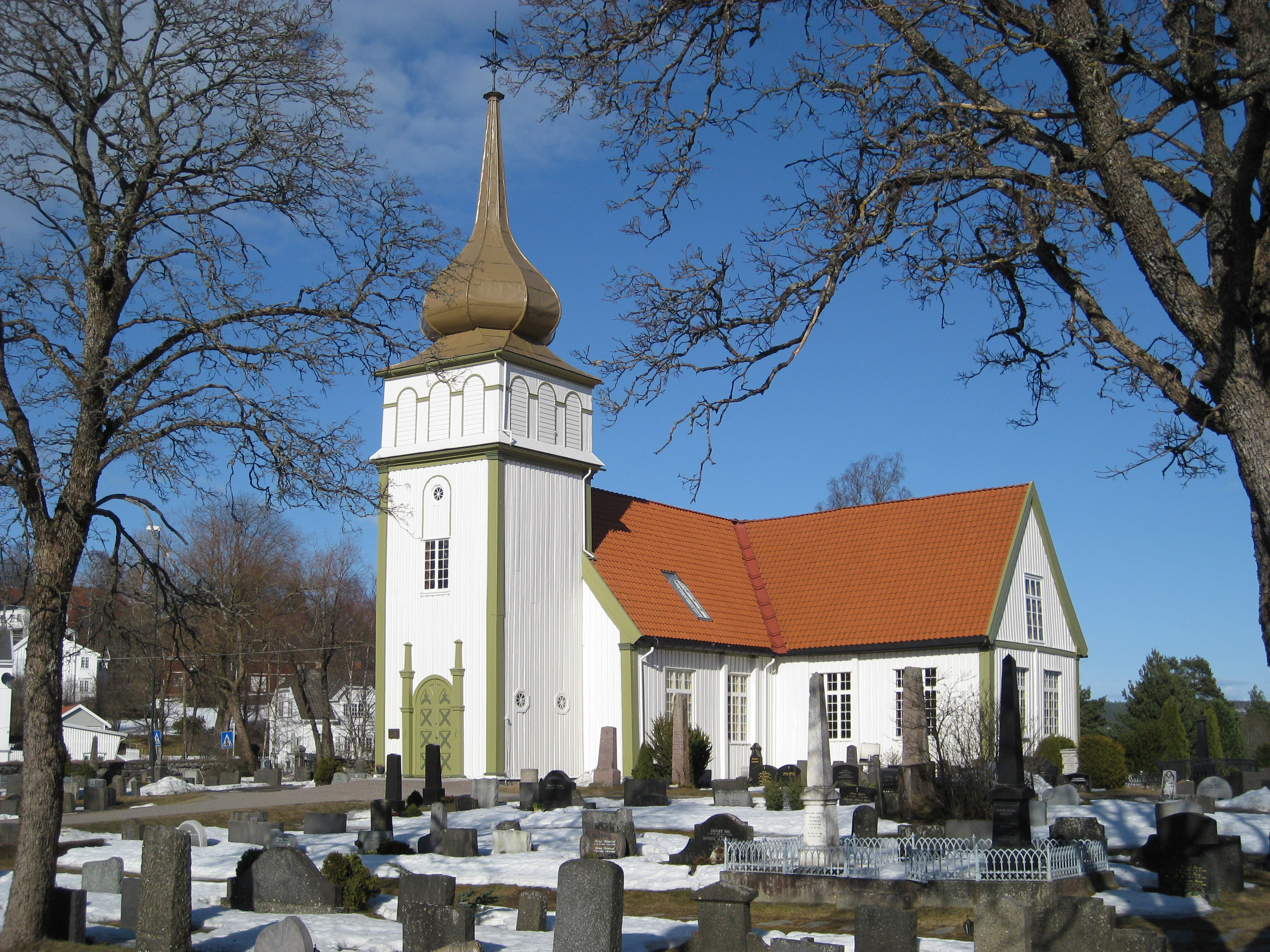
- View of Vinger Church

- Hedmark within Norway

- Vinger within Hedmark
- Coordinates: 60°11′42″N 12°00′38″E
- Country: Norway
- County: Hedmark
- District: Vinger
- Established: 1 Jan 1838
  - Created as: Formannskapsdistrikt
- Disestablished: 1 Jan 1964
  - Succeeded by: Kongsvinger Municipality
- Administrative centre: Kongsvinger

Government
  - Mayor (1952–1963): Einar Tjernsberg

Area (upon dissolution)
  - Total: 499.2 km^{2} (192.7 sq mi)
  - Rank: #201 in Norway
- Highest elevation: 460 m (1,510 ft)

Population (1963)
  - Total: 6,228
  - Rank: #132 in Norway
  - Density: 12.5/km^{2} (32/sq mi)
  - Change (10 years): ▲ +7.8%
- Demonym: Vingersokning

Official language
  - Norwegian form: Bokmål
- Time zone: UTC+01:00 (CET)
  - Summer (DST): UTC+02:00 (CEST)
- ISO 3166 code: NO-0421

Vinger is a former municipality in the old Hedmark county, Norway. The 499-square-kilometre (193 sq mi) municipality existed from 1838 until its dissolution in 1964. The area is now part of Kongsvinger Municipality in the traditional district of Vinger in the southern part of the county, along the border with Sweden. The administrative centre of Vinger was located in the town of Kongsvinger where Vinger Church is located (the town was not actually part of the municipality, but this was where the councils met). Some villages in Vinger included Granli, Austmarka, and Skinnarbøl

Prior to its dissolution in 1963, the 499.2-square-kilometre (192.7 sq mi) municipality was the 201st largest by area out of the 689 municipalities in Norway. Vinger Municipality was the 132nd most populous municipality in Norway with a population of about 6,228. The municipality's population density was 12.5 inhabitants per square kilometre (32/sq mi) and its population had increased by 7.8% over the previous 10-year period.

== General information ==
The prestegjeld of Vinger was established as a municipality on 1 January 1838 (see formannskapsdistrikt law). In 1854, the King issued a royal decree that declared the village area around the Kongsvinger Fortress to be a kjøpstad called Kongsvinger. On 7 February 1855, the town of Kongsvinger (population: 472) was separated from Vinger Municipality to become the new Kongsvinger Municipality (which was very small and just included the town itself). Afterwards, Vinger Municipality had a population of 10,947.

In 1864 the southern part of the municipality (population: 6,920) was separated from Vinger Municipality to form the new Eidskog Municipality. This division left Vinger Municipality with a population of 6,226. On 1 January 1876 a part of Vinger Municipality adjacent to the town of Kongsvinger containing 209 inhabitants was transferred to Kongsvinger Municipality.

During the 1960s there were many municipal mergers across Norway, due to the work of the Schei Committee. On 1 January 1964 a large municipal merger took place, merging the following areas to form the new Kongsvinger Municipality with a total population of 12,990.

- Vinger Municipality (population: 6,257)
- Brandval Municipality (population: 4,384)
- town of Kongsvinger (population: 2,349)

=== Etymology ===
The whole region was historically called Vinger (Old Norse: Vingr) and this name was given to the municipality upon its creation in 1838. This name could be related to the river Glomma which flows through the region. One could compare this to the English word swing (for the missing s see Indo-European s-mobile). The river Glomma passes through the center of the district where the south-flowing river takes a sharp northwestward turn. This can be compared to the similar Lithuanian word vìngis which means "bend", "bow", or "turn".

=== Churches ===
The Church of Norway had one parish (sokn) within Vinger Municipality. At the time of the municipal dissolution, it was part of the Vinger prestegjeld and the Vinger og Odal prosti (deanery) in the Diocese of Hamar.

Churches in Vinger
Parish (sokn)	Church name	Location of the church	Year built
Vinger	Vinger Church*	Kongsvinger	1699
Vinger	Austmarka Chapel	Austmarka	1858
*Note: This church was in Kongsvinger Municipality, but served the people of Vinger Municipality as well.

== Geography ==
The municipality was located in the northern part of the traditional district of Vinger. The highest point in the municipality was the 460-metre (1,510 ft) tall point in the Fuglemyråsen area. Brandval Municipality was located to the north, Sør-Odal Municipality was located to the west, and Eidskog Municipality was located to the south. The town of Kongsvinger was an enclave within Vinger Municipality. The Kingdom of Sweden was to the east of Vinger Municipality and both Gunnarskog Municipality (present-day Arvika Municipality) and Fryksände Municipality (present-day Torsby Municipality) lay along the eastern border.

== Government ==
While it existed, Vinger Municipality was responsible for primary education (through 10th grade), outpatient health services, senior citizen services, welfare and other social services, zoning, economic development, and municipal roads and utilities. The municipality was governed by a municipal council of directly elected representatives. The mayor was indirectly elected, by a vote of the municipal council. The municipality was under the jurisdiction of the Eidsivating Court of Appeal.

=== Municipal council ===
The municipal council (Herredsstyre) of Vinger Municipality was made up of 25 representatives that were elected to four-year terms. The tables below show the historical composition of the council by political party.

Vinger herredsstyre 1959–1963
Party name (in Norwegian)	Number of representatives
Labour Party (Arbeiderpartiet)	18
Conservative Party (Høyre)	1
Communist Party (Kommunistiske Parti)	2
Centre Party (Senterpartiet)	3
Liberal Party (Venstre)	1
Total number of members:	25
Note: On 1 January 1964, Vinger Municipality became part of Kongsvinger Municipality.

Vinger herredsstyre 1955–1959
Party name (in Norwegian)	Number of representatives
Labour Party (Arbeiderpartiet)	18
Conservative Party (Høyre)	1
Communist Party (Kommunistiske Parti)	2
Farmers' Party (Bondepartiet)	2
Liberal Party (Venstre)	2
Total number of members:	25

Vinger herredsstyre 1951–1955
Party name (in Norwegian)	Number of representatives
Labour Party (Arbeiderpartiet)	15
Conservative Party (Høyre)	1
Communist Party (Kommunistiske Parti)	4
Farmers' Party (Bondepartiet)	2
Liberal Party (Venstre)	2
Total number of members:	24

Vinger herredsstyre 1947–1951
Party name (in Norwegian)	Number of representatives
Labour Party (Arbeiderpartiet)	14
Communist Party (Kommunistiske Parti)	6
Farmers' Party (Bondepartiet)	1
Joint list of the Liberal Party (Venstre) and the Radical People's Party (Radikale Folkepartiet)	3
Total number of members:	24

Vinger herredsstyre 1945–1947
Party name (in Norwegian)	Number of representatives
Labour Party (Arbeiderpartiet)	15
Communist Party (Kommunistiske Parti)	5
Joint list of the Liberal Party (Venstre) and the Radical People's Party (Radikale Folkepartiet)	3
Joint List(s) of Non-Socialist Parties (Borgerlige Felleslister)	1
Total number of members:	24

Vinger herredsstyre 1937–1941*
Party name (in Norwegian)	Number of representatives
Labour Party (Arbeiderpartiet)	17
Conservative Party (Høyre)	1
Farmers' Party (Bondepartiet)	1
Liberal Party (Venstre)	5
Total number of members:	24
Note: Due to the German occupation of Norway during World War II, no elections were held for new municipal councils until after the war ended in 1945.

=== Mayors ===
The mayor (Norwegian: ordfører) of Vinger Municipality was the political leader of the municipality and the chairperson of the municipal council. The following people have held this position:

- 1838–1838: Lars T. Bierkebæk
- 1839–1842: Michael Strøm Lie
- 1844–1847: Mentz Rynning
- 1847–1852: Michael Strøm Lie
- 1853–1854: Sigvald Rynning
- 1855–1859: F.D. Werenskiold
- 1859–1869: Mentz Rynning
- 1870–1870: Petter Holm
- 1871–1872: T. Grønvold
- 1873–1880: Albert Jacobsen
- 1881–1888: Thomas von Westen Engelhart
- 1889–1896: Hans Lemmich Juell
- 1897–1907: C. Larsmoen
- 1908–1913: Otto Olsen Pramm (V)
- 1914–1916: Th. Løvenskiold
- 1917–1919: Christian Eng
- 1920–1929: Ivar Færder (NKP)
- 1930–1931: Ole Smedstad
- 1932–1934: Bottolf Engebretsen
- 1935–1936: Alf Arnesen
- 1937–1940: Ivar Færder (NKP)
- 1941–1945: Kristian Grasmo (NS)
- 1945–1951: Ivar Færder (NKP)
- 1952–1963: Einar Tjernsberg

== Notable people ==
Notable people that were born or lived in Vinger include:

- Jørgen Young (1781–1837), a timber merchant and member of the Storting
- Ivar Færder, a newspaper editor and politician who was the mayor of Vinger Municipality

== See also ==
- List of former municipalities of Norway
