= Romerike and Glåmdal District Court =

First-instance law court in Norway

- Romerike og Glåmdal tingrett
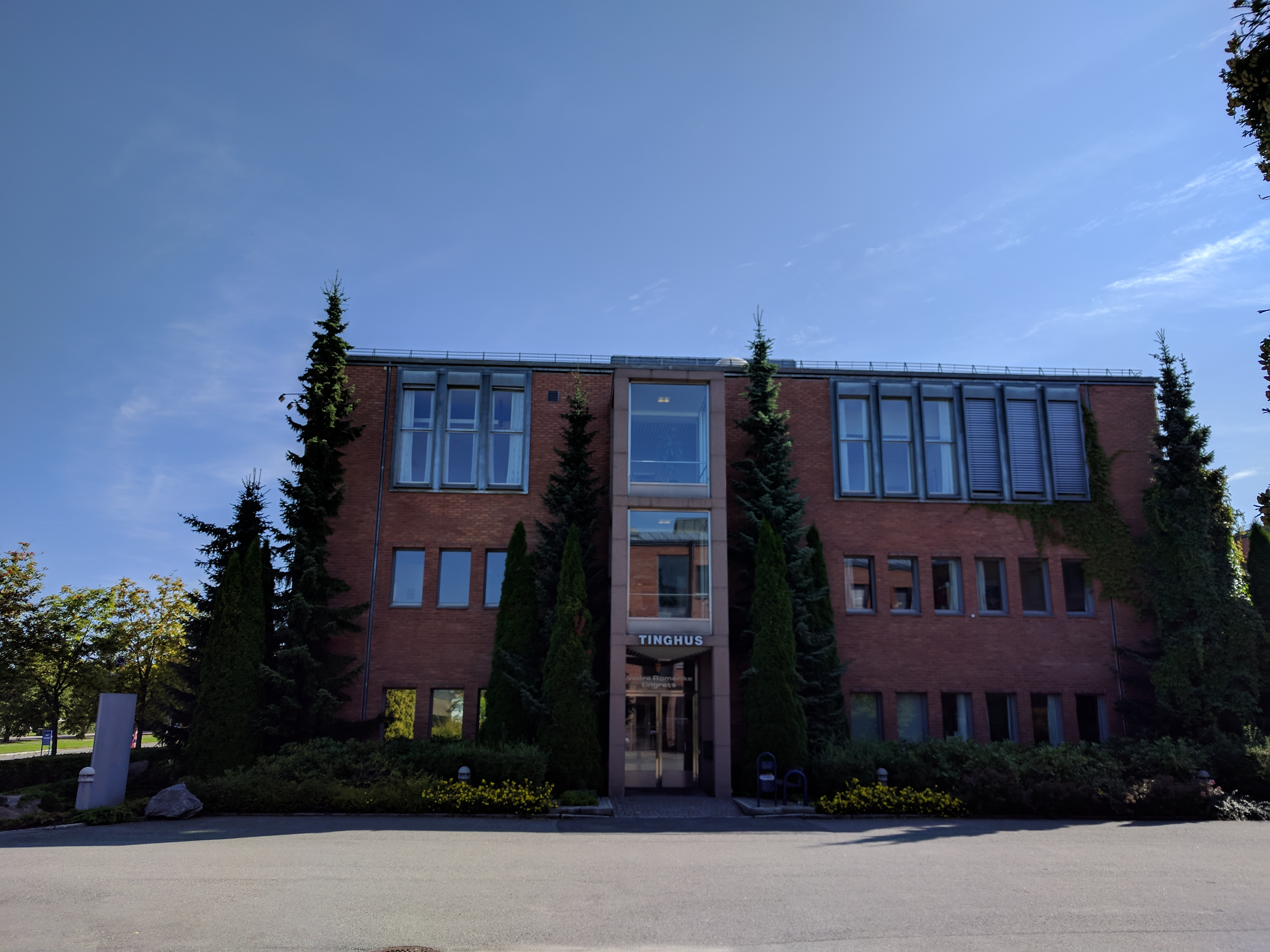
- View of the Lillestrøm courthouse
- Interactive map of Romerike and Glåmdal; District Court
- 59.9550971°N 11.037939071°E
- Established: 26 April 2021
- Jurisdiction: Romerike and Glåmdal, Norway
- Location: Eidsvoll, Kongsvinger, and Lillestrøm
- Coordinates: 59.9550971°N 11.037939071°E
- Appeals to: Eidsivating Court of Appeal
- Website: Official website

Romerike and Glåmdal District Court (Norwegian: Romerike og Glåmdal tingrett) is a district court located in Innlandet and Akershus counties in Norway. This court is based at three different courthouses which are located in Eidsvoll, Kongsvinger, and Lillestrøm. The court serves the southeastern part of Innlandet county and the northern part of Akershus county. The court is subordinate to the Eidsivating Court of Appeal. The court accepts cases from 16 municipalities as follows:

- The courthouse in Kongsvinger accepts cases from the municipalities of Eidskog, Grue, Kongsvinger, Nord-Odal, and Sør-Odal.
- The courthouse in Eidsvoll accepts cases from the municipalities of Eidsvoll, Hurdal, Nannestad, Nes, and Ullensaker.
- The courthouse in Lillestrøm accepts cases from the municipalities of Aurskog-Høland, Gjerdrum, Lillestrøm, Lørenskog, Nittedal, and Rælingen.

The court is led by a chief judge (sorenskriver) and several other judges. The court is a court of first instance. Its judicial duties are mainly to settle criminal cases and to resolve civil litigation as well as bankruptcy. The administration and registration tasks of the court include death registration, issuing certain certificates, performing duties of a notary public, and officiating civil wedding ceremonies. Cases from this court are heard by a combination of professional judges and lay judges. Cases from this district court may be appealed to the Eidsivating Court of Appeal.

== History ==
This court was established on 26 April 2021 after the old Glåmdal District Court, Nedre Romerike District Court, and Øvre Romerike District Court were all merged into one court. The new district court system continues to use the courthouses from the predecessor courts.
