= Øvre Romerike District Court =

Former district court in Norway

- Øvre Romerike tingrett
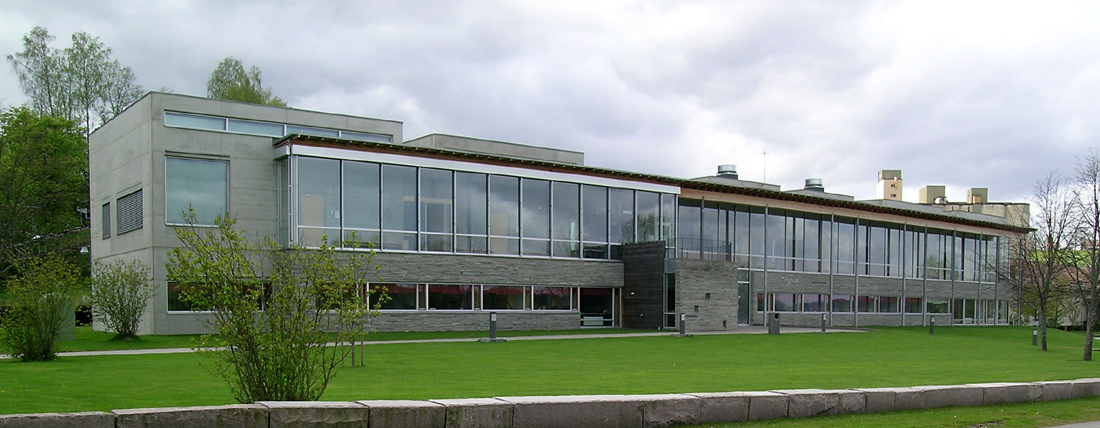
- The Courthouse of Eidsvoll
- 60°19′40″N 11°15′05″E
- Established: 1591
- Dissolved: 26 April 2021
- Jurisdiction: Upper Romerike
- Location: Viken, Norway
- Coordinates: 60°19′40″N 11°15′05″E
- Appeals to: Eidsivating Court of Appeal

Øvre Romerike District Court (Norwegian: Øvre Romerike tingrett) was a district court in Viken county, Norway. The court was based in Eidsvoll in Eidsvoll Municipality. The court existed until 2021. It had jurisdiction over upper Romerike which included the municipalities of Eidsvoll, Hurdal, Nannestad, Nes, and Ullensaker. Cases from this court could be appealed to Eidsivating Court of Appeal.

The court was a court of first instance. Its judicial duties were mainly to settle criminal cases and to resolve civil litigation as well as bankruptcy. The administration and registration tasks of the court included death registration, issuing certain certificates, performing duties of a notary public, and officiating civil wedding ceremonies. Cases from this court were heard by a combination of professional judges and lay judges.

== History ==
The district court for Øvre Romerike was first created in 1591. Over time, the area of its jurisdiction varied and changed. In 1844, the southern part of the geographical jurisdiction was separated to create the new Nes District Court while the remaining parts of Øvre Romerike District Court in the north was renamed as Eidsvoll District Court. On 1 January 2006, the Nes District Court was closed and its geographical jurisdiction was moved to other courts. At that time, Nes Municipality was moved to the Eidsvoll District Court and at the same time, the name was changed (back) to Øvre Romerike District Court.

On 26 April 2021, the Øvre Romerike District Court was merged with the Nedre Romerike District Court and the Glåmdal District Court to create the new Romerike og Glåmdal District Court.
