= Ivar Færder =

Norwegian newspaper editor and politician

Ivar Marius Færder (19 July 1886 – 3 September 1968) was a Norwegian newspaper editor and politician for the Labour and Communist parties.

He was born at Færder in Åsnes as a son of farmers Helge Lundkvist and Karen Færder. He took basic education in his county, and in Kristiania from 1908 to 1909. He had been secretary of his party branch in Hedemarkens Amt from 1907, and from 1909 to 1910 he edited the Labour newspaper Solungen in Solør. From 1911 to 1915 he was a police officer, and also a smallholder. He chaired the regional party branch in Solør from 1913.

From 1913 to 1915 he was a member of Åsnes municipal council. He then became a civil servant in Vinger Municipality. He was elected as mayor of Vinger in 1919, and served as such before the Second World War, except for two periods (of three years each). He was elected as a deputy representative to the Parliament of Norway in 1918 from the constituency Vinger og Odalen. From 1925 to 1927 he served a second term as a deputy, from Hedmark, this time for the Communist Party. In the 1927 election he was their fourth ballot candidate in Hedmark, and barely missed being elected as a deputy.

He was a member of Åsnes school board from 1912 to 1915, Vinger school board from 1917 to 1920 and the county roads board from 1925 to 1928. In October 1940, during the occupation of Norway by Nazi Germany, he was removed as mayor of Vinger by the Nazi authorities. He was also arrested, and imprisoned in Møllergata 19 from October to December 1940.

After the war he chaired Hedmark county council from 1945 to 1947.
