= Solør District Court =

District court in Innlandet, Norway

- Solør tingrett
- 60°36′47″N 12°00′40″E
- Established: 31 March 1847
- Dissolved: 1 April 2006
- Jurisdiction: Solør
- Location: Flisa, Innlandet, Norway
- Coordinates: 60°36′47″N 12°00′40″E
- Appeals to: Eidsivating Court of Appeal

Solør District Court (Norwegian: Solør tingrett) was a district court in Innlandet county, Norway. The court was based in Flisa. The court existed from 1847 until 2021. It served Våler Municipality, Åsnes Municipality, and Grue Municipality. Cases from this court could be appealed to Eidsivating Court of Appeal.

The court was a court of first instance. Its judicial duties were mainly to settle criminal cases and to resolve civil litigation as well as bankruptcy. The administration and registration tasks of the court included death registration, issuing certain certificates, performing duties of a notary public, and officiating civil wedding ceremonies. Cases from this court were heard by a combination of professional judges and lay judges.

== History ==
This court was created on 31 March 1847 when the old Solør og Odalen District Court was split in two: the new Solør District Court and the new Vinger og Odal District Court. The headquarters of the new Solør District Court were at Flisa. On 1 April 2006, the Solør District Court ceased to exist. Grue Municipality was transferred to the Vinger og Odal District Court which was then renamed Glåmdal District Court. Also on that date, the municipalities of Våler and Åsnes were transferred to the Sør-Østerdal District Court.

== District stipendiary magistrates ==
The district stipendiary magistrate (Norwegian: sorenskriver) is the chief justice in a district court. The district stipendiary magistrates of Solør were:

- 1847–1869: Wilhelm J. B. Fietzentz
- 1859–1878: Philip Henrik Hansteen
- 1879–1899: Fredrik V. V. Norgrenn
- 1899–1917: Johann Bernt Krohg
- 1917–1922: Johan Georg Gulbranson
- 1922–1928: Johannes Nielsen Omsted
- 1928–1932: Søren Kristian Sætre
- 1932–1952: Jens Roll-Hansen
- 1952–1973: Finn Palmstrøm
- 1973–1977: Johannes Risting
- 1977–1993: Otto Weng
- 1993–2006: Einar Thomesen
