= Philip Henrik Hansteen =

Norwegian judge

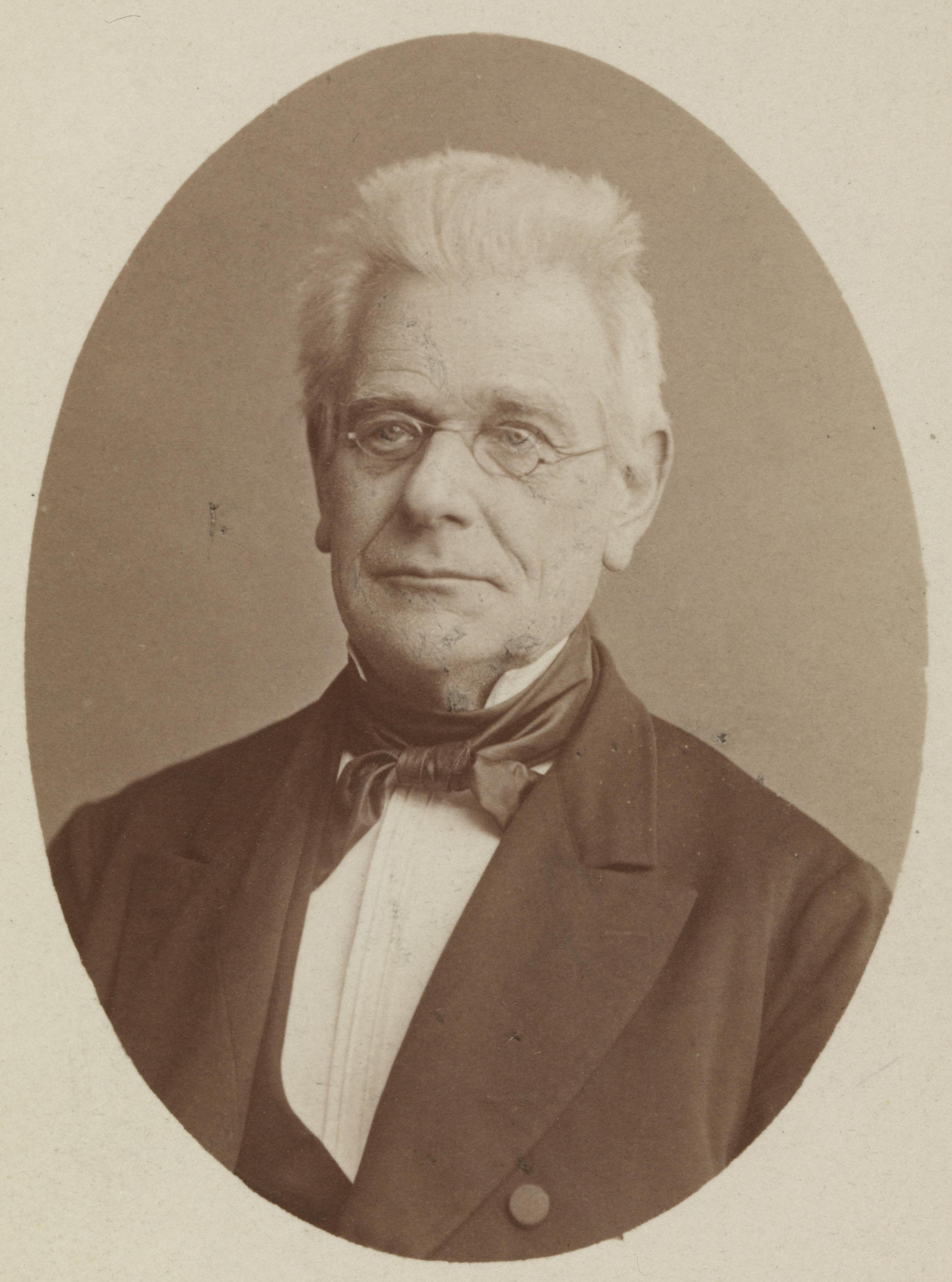
Portrait of Philip Henrik Hansteen

Philip Henrik Hansteen (30 March 1817 – 13 June 1911) was a Norwegian judge.

He was born in Moss, and graduated as a Candidate of Law in 1840. From 1840 to 1842 he was a deputy judge in Moss District Court. Notably, he participated in what was probably Norway's last sentencing to pillory. He later served as district stipendiary magistrate of Sør-Østerdal District Court from 1854 to 1869, then of Solør District Court from 1869 to 1879. In 1879 he became a Supreme Court Assessor, first extraordinary, then permanent.
