= Nedre Romerike District Court =

Former district court in Norway

- Nedre Romerike tingrett
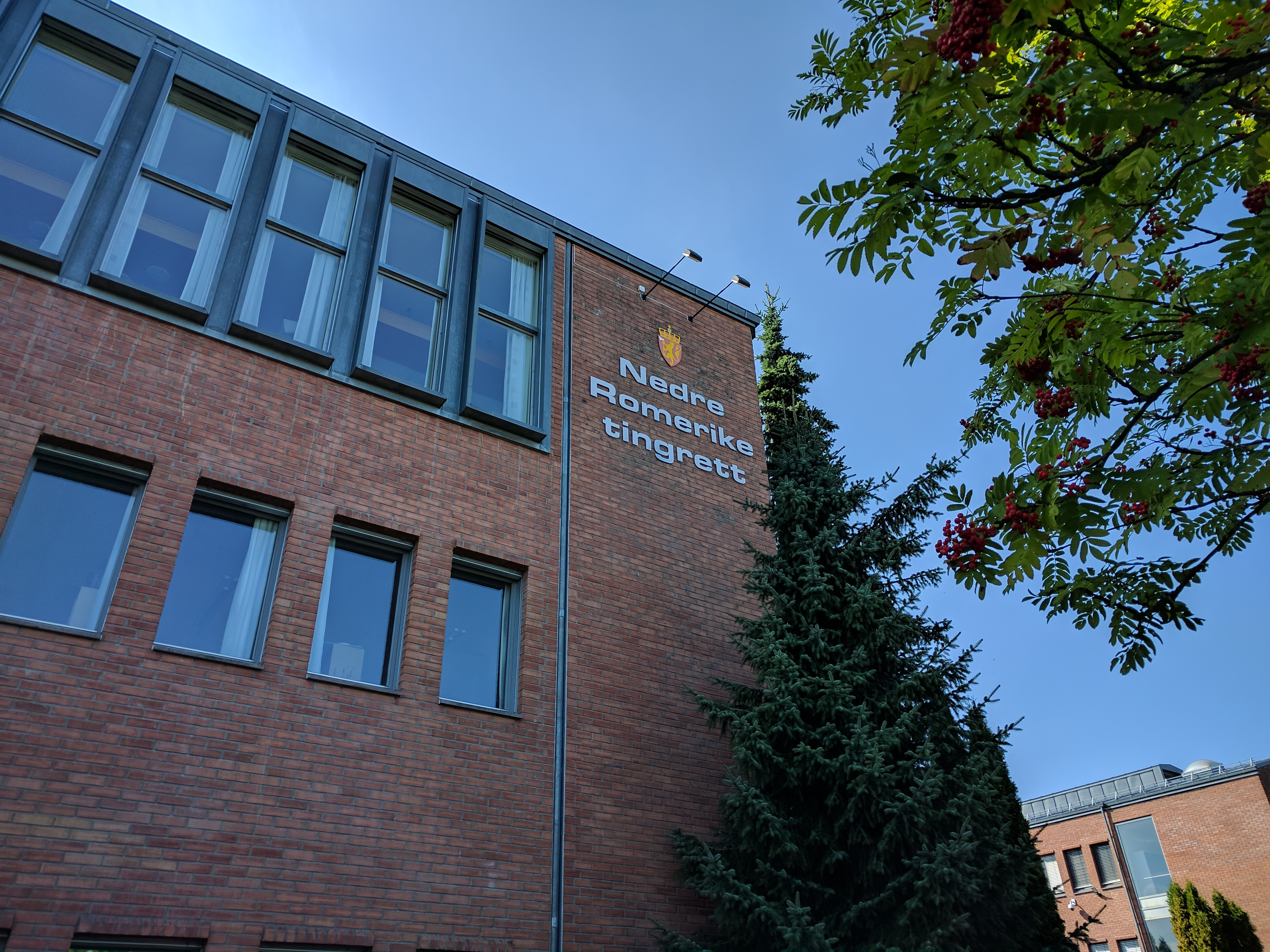
- Courthouse in Lillestrøm
- 59°57′18″N 11°02′16″E
- Established: 1591
- Dissolved: 26 April 2021
- Jurisdiction: Lower Romerike
- Location: Viken, Norway
- Coordinates: 59°57′18″N 11°02′16″E
- Appeals to: Eidsivating Court of Appeal

Nedre Romerike District Court (Norwegian: Nedre Romerike tingrett) was a district court in Viken county, Norway. The court was based in Lillestrøm in Lillestrøm Municipality. The court existed until 2021. It had jurisdiction over lower Romerike which included the municipalities of Aurskog-Høland, Gjerdrum, Lillestrøm, Lørenskog, Nittedal, and Rælingen. Cases from this court could be appealed to Eidsivating Court of Appeal.

The court was a court of first instance. Its judicial duties were mainly to settle criminal cases and to resolve civil litigation as well as bankruptcy. The administration and registration tasks of the court included death registration, issuing certain certificates, performing duties of a notary public, and officiating civil wedding ceremonies. Cases from this court were heard by a combination of professional judges and lay judges.

== History ==
The district court for Nedre Romerike was first created in 1591. Over time, the area of its jurisdiction varied and changed. In 1959, the Nedre Romerike District Court was divided, with Nedre Romerike District Court having jurisdiction over of the municipalities of Rælingen, Gjerdrum, Fet, and the parts of Skedsmo located east of the Nitelva River while the new Strømmen District Court consisted of the municipalities of Nittedal, Lørenskog, and the parts of Skedsmo located to the west of the Nitelva River. In 1990, the Strømmen District Court was merged back into the Nedre Romerike District Court. At the same time in 1990, the newly merged court moved into a new courthouse in Lillestrøm. On 1 January 2006, the old Nes District Court was dissolved and its areas of jurisdiction were moved to other courts. At that time, Aurskog-Høland Municipality and Sørum Municipality joined the area of the Nedre Romerike District Court.

On 26 April 2021, the Nedre Romerike District Court was merged with the Øvre Romerike District Court and the Glåmdal District Court to create the new Romerike og Glåmdal District Court.
