= Vinger Royal Road =

Ancient route in southern Norway

Coordinates: 59.937167°N 12.205540°E

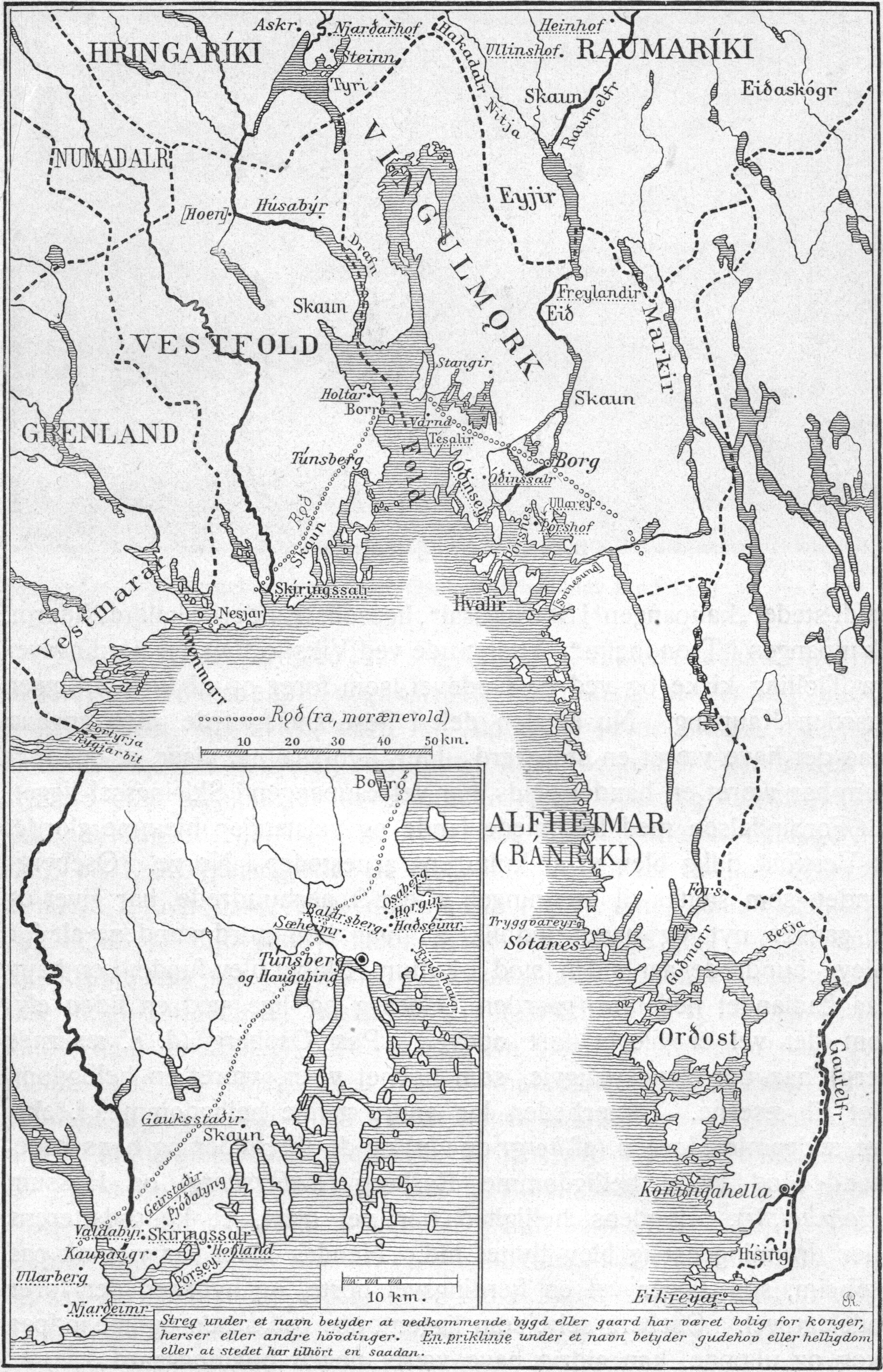
Map of Viken in the Middle Ages

Vinger Royal Road (Eskoleia) was the historical name of an ancient route in southern Norway. Historically Eskoleia was one of the most important traffic arteries between Norway and Sweden. It provided an established road leading both north and south from the Swedish border.

After the canonization of Saint Olaf in 1031, Eskoleia became an important pilgrim’s route from Sweden. During the early medieval period, pilgrims traveled to the shrine of St. Olaf at Trondheim. In Koppom in Eda Municipality, there was an old chapel site from pilgrimage hikes to Nidaros, with cross and altar called Eskoleia Uligama. From Sweden, Eskoleia went from Vingulmark (the land south and east of the Oslo Fjord) over Raumariki along Glomma further over Odal and Vinger to Eidskog.

The road has also been important militarily and the route of several invasions throughout history. The last time the Swedish forces attacked by way of Eidskog was in 1814 when Maj. Gen. Carl Pontus Gahn crossed the border and marched towards Kongsvinger Fortress.

The importance of the route was strengthened with the opening in 1862 of Grensebanen, the Kongsvinger Railway Line which connected Oslo to Stockholm. Today Riksvei 2 runs between Kløfta in Innlandet county and the border with Sweden via Kongsvinger. In Sweden, the road continues as Riksväg 61. The road is one of the most used routes between Oslo and Sweden.

== See also ==
- St. Olav’s Way
- Battle of Matrand

== Other sources ==
- Rastad, Per Erik (1982) Kongsvinger festnings historie. Krigsårene 1807–1814
- Rastad, Per Erik (2004) Sju dramatiske år - Ufredstid i Glåmdalsdistriktet 1807–1814
