= Vinger Church =

Church in Innlandet, Norway

- Vinger kirke
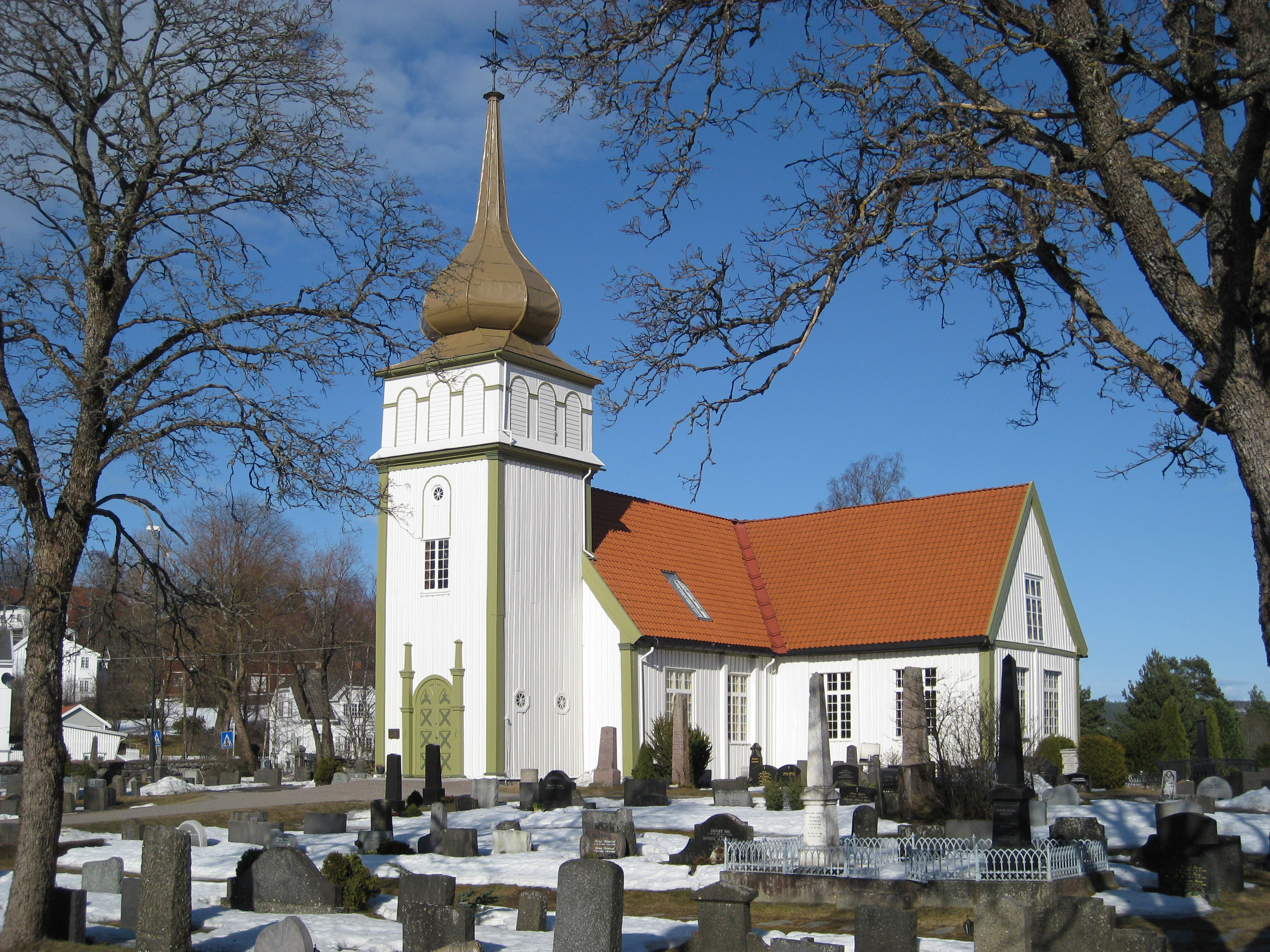
- View of the church
- Vinger Church
- 60°11′41″N 12°00′38″E
- Location: Kongsvinger, Innlandet
- Country: Norway
- Denomination: Church of Norway
- Previous denomination: Catholic Church
- Churchmanship: Evangelical Lutheran

History
- Status: Parish church
- Founded: 12th century
- Consecrated: 6 January 1699

Architecture
- Functional status: Active
- Architect: Peder Gundersen Norigarden
- Architectural type: Cruciform
- Completed: 1697 (329 years ago)

Specifications
- Capacity: 600
- Materials: Wood

Administration
- Diocese: Hamar bispedømme
- Deanery: Solør, Vinger og Odal prosti
- Parish: Vinger
- Norwegian Cultural Heritage Site
- Type: Church
- Status: Automatically protected
- ID: 85850

Vinger Church (Norwegian: Vinger kirke) is a parish church of the Church of Norway in Kongsvinger Municipality in Innlandet county, Norway. It is located in the town of Kongsvinger. It is the church for the Vinger parish which is part of the Solør, Vinger og Odal prosti (deanery) in the Diocese of Hamar. The white, wooden church was built in a cruciform design in 1697 using plans drawn up by the architect Peder Gundersen Norigarden. The church seats about 600 people.

== History ==
The earliest existing historical records of the church date back to the year 1227, but that was not the year of construction. The first church in Kongsvinger was a wooden stave church that was likely built during the 12th century. This church was located about 1 kilometre (0.62 mi) east of the present site of the church, on the opposite side of the river Glomma. The first historical mention of the church was in the book Hákonar saga Hákonarsonar which describes a battle in Kongsvinger. The church originally was set up as a long church. Some time before 1676, the church was heavily remodeled and enlarged by adding two wings to give the building a cruciform floor plan.

In the 1690s, planning began for a new church for the growing town. The old church was on the shore of the river Glomma and it was on the opposite side of the river from the town. Flooding along the river had also been an issue, so it was decided to move the church site across the river, about 1 kilometre (0.62 mi) to the west, just south of the Kongsvinger Fortress. The new site was high above the river and very close to the growing town. The new wooden church was designed by Peder Gundersen Norigarden and it also had a cruciform floor plan. Construction took place in 1697, with the foundation stone being laid in June 1697 by the commander of the Fortress, Johan Nicolai Møllerup. The church was consecrated on 6 January 1699 by the Bishop Hans Rosing. The old church fell into disrepair after it was closed and several years later, it was torn down.

In 1814, this church served as an election church (Norwegian: valgkirke). Together with more than 300 other parish churches across Norway, it was a polling station for elections to the 1814 Norwegian Constituent Assembly which wrote the Constitution of Norway. This was Norway's first national elections. Each church parish was a constituency that elected people called "electors" who later met together in each county to elect the representatives for the assembly that was to meet at Eidsvoll Manor later that year.

By the mid-1800s, the church was in poor condition. In 1854–1855, the church was renovated, including the re-construction of the tower, giving the church a new onion dome on top. In 1868–1869, the church exterior was changed from a brown-red color to white.

== Media gallery ==
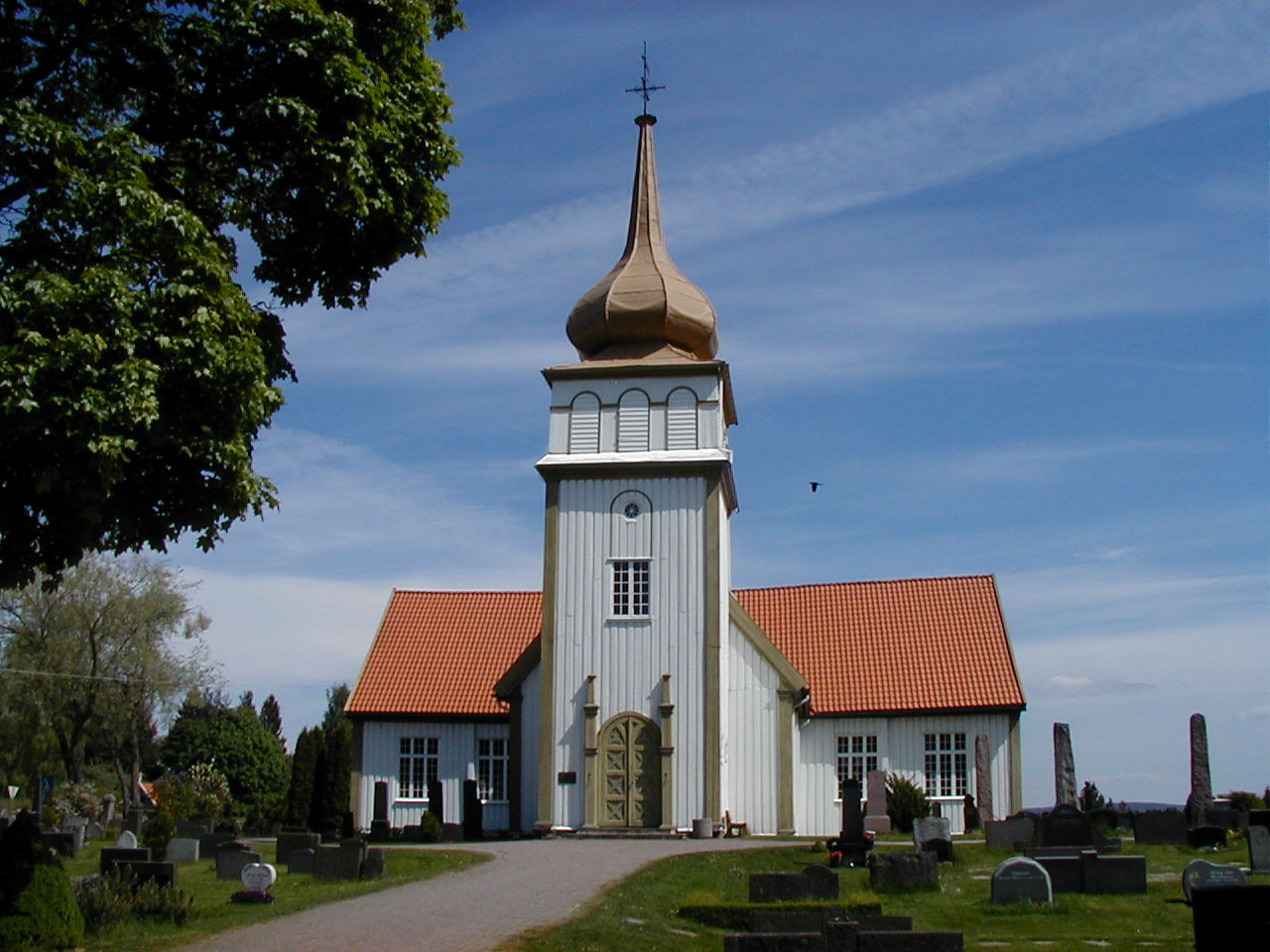

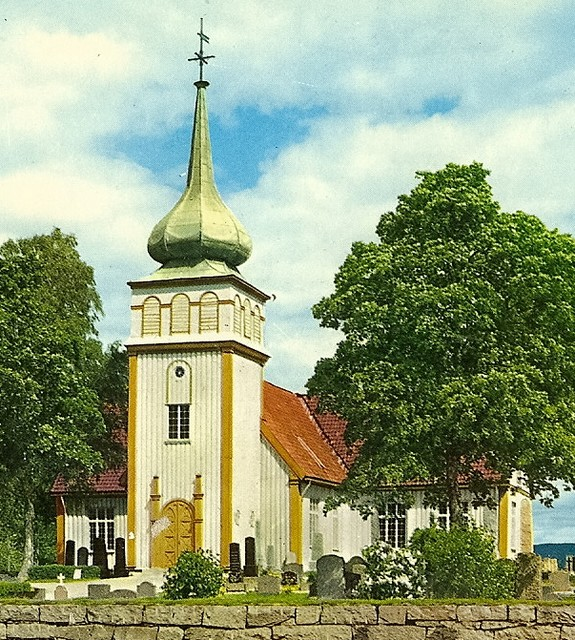

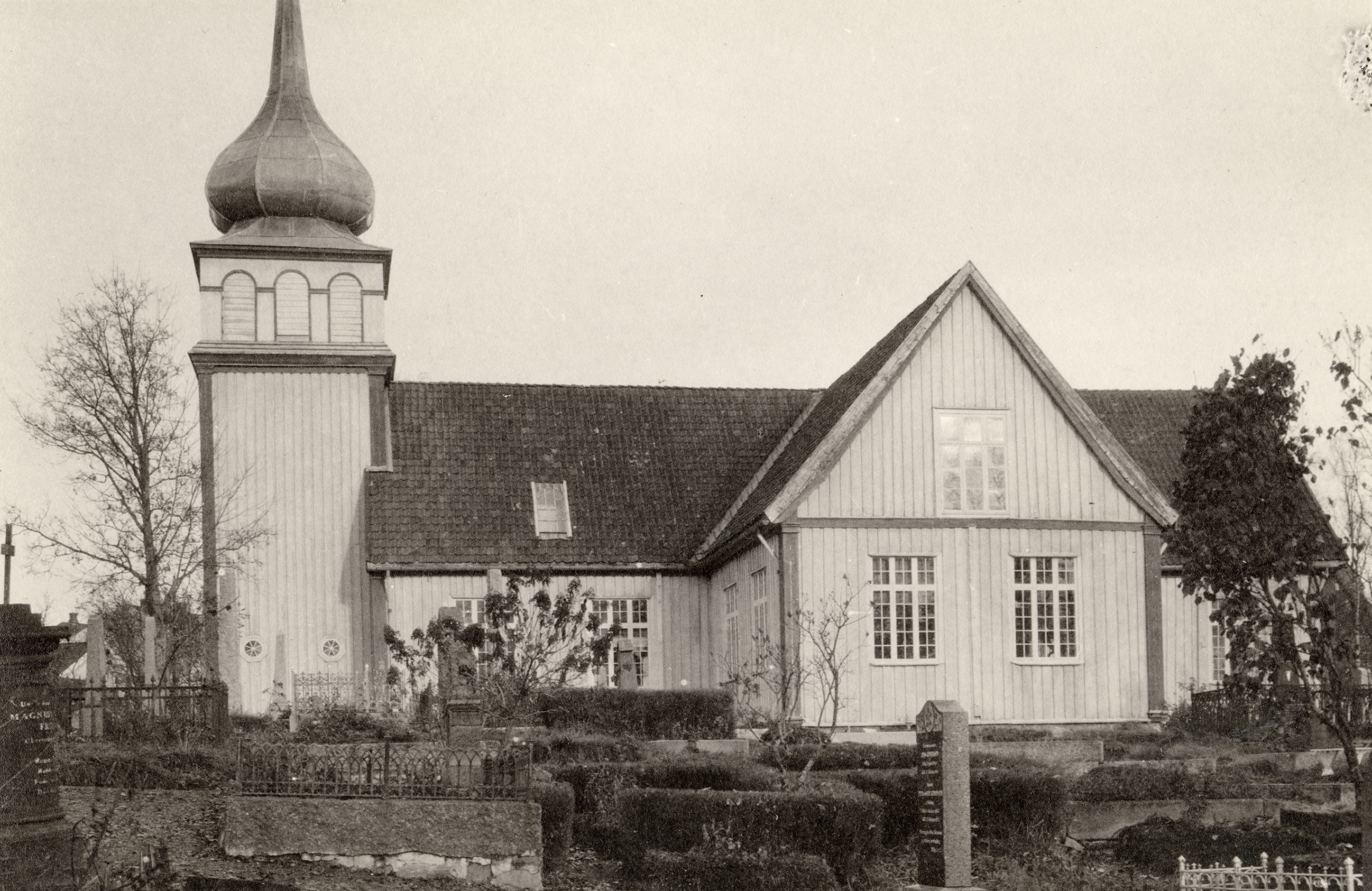

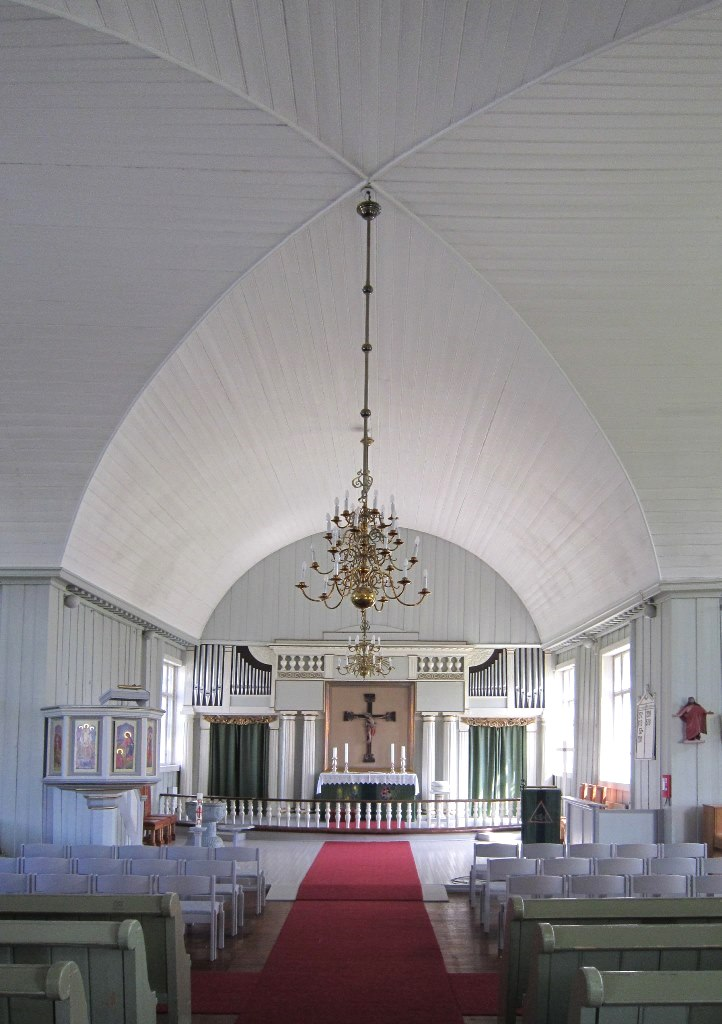

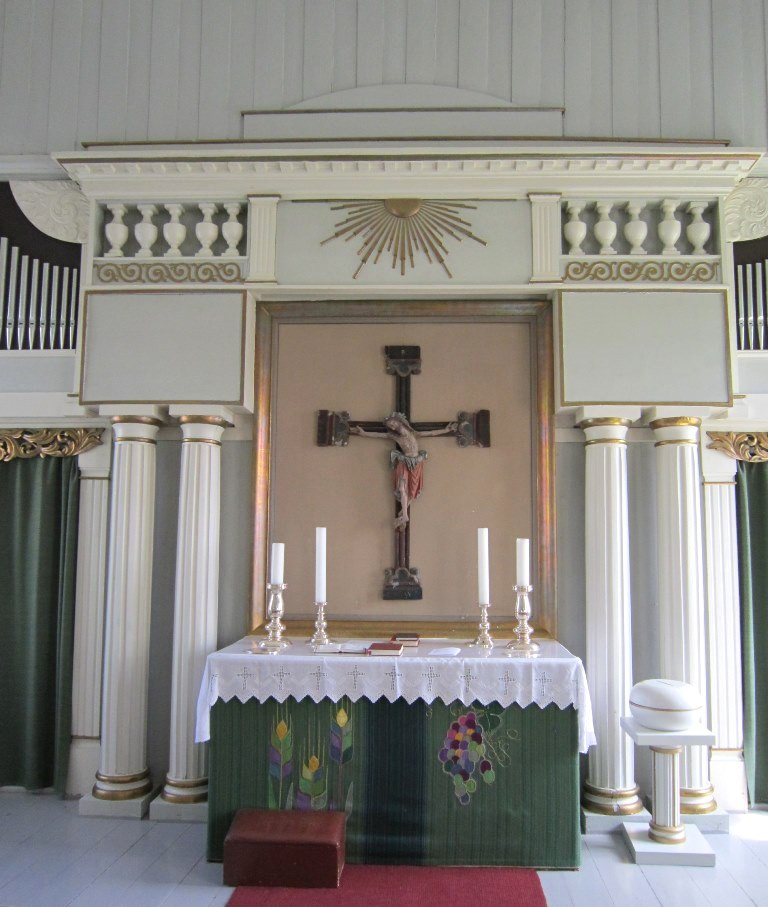

== See also ==
- List of churches in Hamar
