= Kongsvinger Fortress =

Building in Kongsvinger, Norway

- Kongsvinger festning
- Kongsvinger, Norway
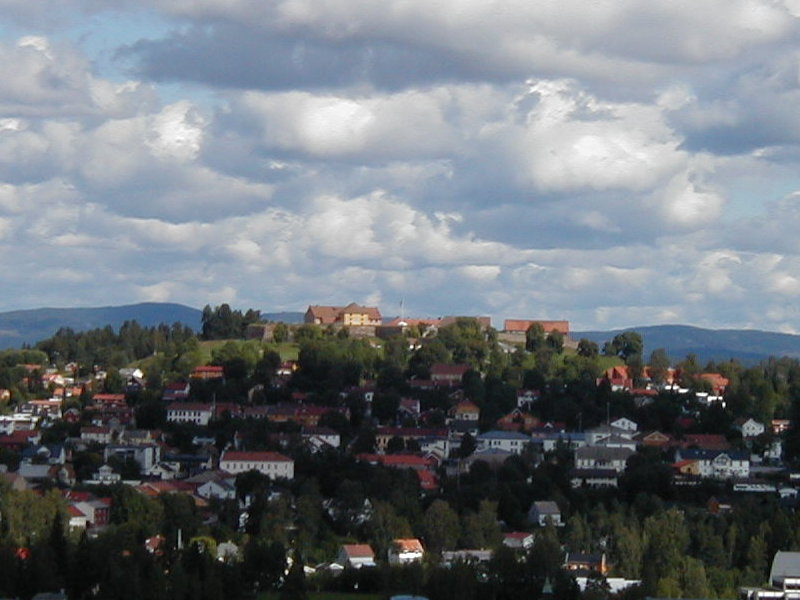
- Kongsvinger Fortress seen from the south

Site information
- Controlled by: Norway
- Open to the public: yes

Location
- Coordinates: 60.198889°N 12.011389°E

Site history
- Built: 1682
- In use: 1682-today

Kongsvinger Fortress (Norwegian: Kongsvinger festning) is located in the city of Kongsvinger which is located within Kongsvinger Municipality in Innlandet county, Norway. It is situated on a hill west and north of the Glomma river, standing astride the ancient Vinger Royal Road, which connected Norway and Värmland, Sweden as well as on the north-south Norwegian route along the Glomma. As Kongsvinger formed a key junction point for these routes, fortifications were constructed there to protect against invasion from the east.

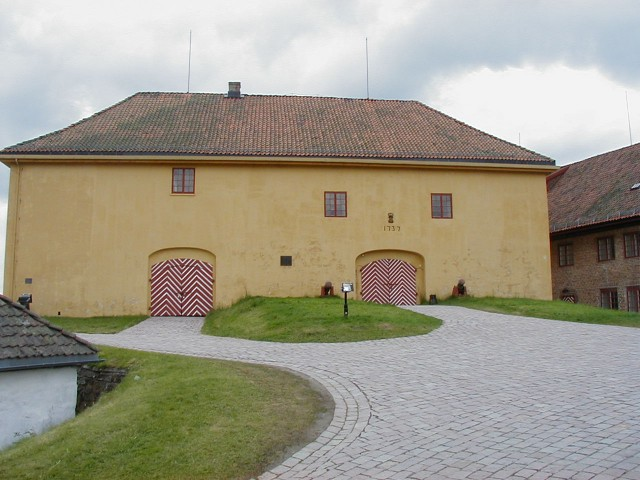
Arsenal at Kongsvinger Fortress.

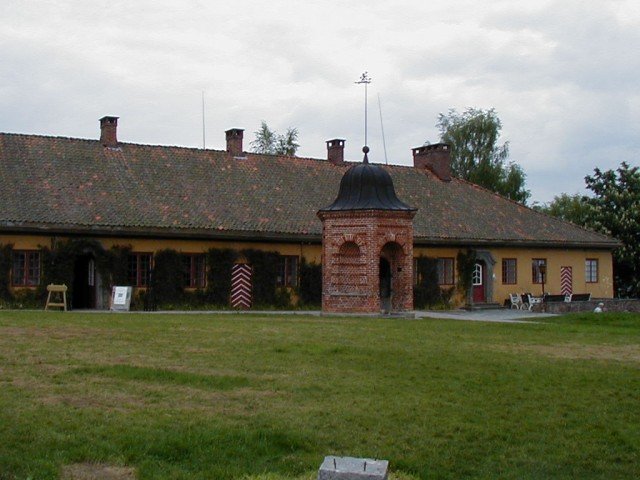
Well and old barracks at Kongsvinger Fortress.

== History ==
=== Medieval period ===
During the early medieval period, pilgrims traveled to the shrine of St. Olaf at Trondheim; a favorite route for those from Sweden (the Vinger Royal Road) passed via Eidskog, Vinger (now Kongsvinger) and Elverum up the Glomma. This important pilgrimage & trade route is mentioned by Adam of Bremen in 1070. Its importance as an established road leading both north and south from the Swedish border was the basis for its later military significance.

Between 1130 and 1217 Norway underwent a period of Civil Wars. The Bagler faction contested with the Birkebeiners, led by the pretender King Sverre, for control during the late 12th century. Many of the rebels found refuge in Värmland and the Vinger area was the site of numerous conflicts.

Sigurd Ribbung harassed King Haakon IV of Norway’s lands across this border. In 1224 they fought a battle at Vinger. Ribbung’s troops were defeated and fled.

=== Early modern period ===
In the spring of 1643 the Swedish Privy Council determined that their military strength made territorial gains at the expense of Denmark/Norway likely. The Count drew up the plan for war and directed a surprise multiple-front attack on Denmark and Norway in May. Norway, which was then governed by Christian's son-in-law, Statholder (royal governor) Hannibal Sehested, was a reluctant participant. Some Finnish people in the Finnskogen, who had migrated from Sweden and whose loyalties were often with Sweden, were caught spying on Norwegian troops at Vinger. A rather desultory war between Sweden and Norway, often called the Hannibal War, resulted from 1643 to 1645. Vinger was the staging area for several minor Norwegian invasions into Sweden as this final episode of the Thirty Years' War was completed. The most important consequence of this war was that the royal governor identified the need for fortifications at Vinger and elsewhere along the border and initiated a tax for the purpose. Since there was great discontent, this tax burden was lifted in 1646 by Christian IV of Denmark and Norway; as a result no fortification construction was begun at that time.

In 1673, Ulrik Frederik Gyldenløve wrote that construction was underway on a defensive structure on top of a hill. Once completed, it would dominate the river and the existing sconce by the ferry crossing. This structure was called Vinger Sconce or Gyldenborg and was a precursor to Kongsvinger Fortress. It was never attacked during the Scanian War, which broke out in 1675, but it did fire its cannons against a Swedish reconnaissance unit. An attack was launched from Vinger in February 1679, but it was unable to penetrate deep into Sweden due to insufficient artillery.

Following the war, fortifications were improved along the border toward Sweden. Plans were made for a star-shaped fortress and construction began in 1682 on the site of the old Vinger Sconce. The new fortress was named Königs Winger, which has since become Kongsvinger, both meaning King's Vinger. Today, Øvrebyen, the old Kongsvinger uptown area around the fortress is dominated by wooden buildings from the 18th and 19th centuries, laid out in the typical right angle square plan - by architect Major General Johan Caspar von Cicignon - popular in this period.

In 1709, during the Great Northern War, Norway was mobilized and by the end of October 1709, 1,500 men were stationed at Kongsvinger. When in 1716 it became apparent that the Charles XII of Sweden intended to invade, three fortresses along the Swedish border were again extensively manned: Kongsvinger Fortress, Basmo Fortress and Fredriksten Fortress. The attack fell on Basmo and Kongsvinger was bypassed.

=== Industrial revolution period ===
Although a significant part of the Norwegian border fortification during several wars with Sweden, Kongsvinger never saw attack. The closest offensive occurred in 1808 during the Napoleonic Wars, when a Swedish column advanced against the fortress of Kongsvinger. They reached the Glomma River after a victory at Lier on 18 April, but did not cross the river and invest the fortress. On 10 March 1809 an interim armistice was signed at Kongsvinger.

Later, in 1814, the most bloody battle between Swedish invaders and defending Norwegian forces during the Napoleonic Wars took place at Matrand, a short distance from Kongsvinger on the Eidskog road. The Swedish lost 337 men, of which many were captured, compared with 139 killed and wounded on the Norwegian side.

Aasmund Olavsson Vinje (1818–1870) was a famous Norwegian poet and journalist who wrote in his Ferdaminni fraa Sumaren 1860, "One of the finest views in the country is to stand at Kongsvinger Fortress and gaze down the Glomma."

=== Twentieth century ===
In 1905, when the union between Sweden and Norway was dissolved, a neutral zone was established in which all fortifications were to be demolished. Kongsvinger lay just outside this zone and the fortification survived.

Nazi Germany invaded Norway on 9 April 1940. Although not invested, Norwegian fortresses fell under German control. In August 1942 a school providing four-week course in national socialist ideology opened for the Germanske SS Norge at Kongsvinger Fortress. Several classes graduated there.

== Commanding officers ==
- 1682 Lieutenant Colonel Georg Reichwein 21.10.1682 -17.02.1689
- 1689 Lieutenant Colonel Johan Braun 18.02.1689 - 17.07.1689
- 1689 Lieutenant Colonel Johan Nicolai Mollerup 18.07.1689 - 09.02.1700

           Acting: Lieutenant Colonel Ole Brun 10.02.1700 - 30.04.1700

- 1700 Colonel Markvard Otto Mangelsen 01.05.1700 - 11.03.1703

           Acting: Unknown 12.03.1703 - 26.03.1703

- 1703 Major Johan Otto Sesterfleth 27.03.1703 - 03.02.1713

           Acting: Major Giert Chr. von Hirch 01.01.17.13 - 21.05.1713

- 1713 Major Jacob Matheson 22.05.1713 - 26.07.1724

           Acting:Claus Emhausen 27.07.1724 - 01.11.1724

- 1724 Lieutenant Colonel Johan Junge 02.11.1724 - 06.12.1745

          Acting: Unknown 07.12.1745 -10.01.1746

- 1746 Lieutenant Colonel Hans Olai Fremmen 11.01.1746 - 13.10.1746

          Acting: Captain Christen Bille 14.10.1746 - 10.01.1747

- 1747 Colonel baron Mogens Holck 11.01.1747 - 18.11.1764

          Acting: Unknown 19.11.1764 - 30.11.1764
          Acting: Lieutenant Colonel Valentin Huitfeldt 01.12.1764 - 31.08.1765
          Acting: Captain David Loeseke 01.09.1765 - 31.01.1766 

- 1766 Lieutenant General Johan Ludvig Maximilian Biellart 01.02.1766 - 07.10.1798

          Acting: Unknown 08.10.1798 - 22.10.1798

- 1798 Colonel Niels Harbou 23.10.1798 - 23.11.1802
- 1802 Colonel Bernhard Ditlev von Staffeldt 24.11.1802 - 24.10.1807

          Acting: Major Andreas Samuel Krebs 01.07.1807 - 24.10.1807

- 1807 Colonel Werner Nicolai de Saue 25.10.1807 - 28.03.1808
- 1808 Colonel Gottfried Carl Gotlob von Blucher 29.03.1808 - 04.09.1808
- 1808 Colonel Johan Andreas Cornelis Ohme 05.09.1808 - 19.10.1808
- 1808 Major Friedrich Johan Wilhelm Haffner 20.10.1808 - 28.09.1808
- 1809 Major Johan Wilhelm Bruenech Stabell 29.09.1808 - 21.02.1810
- 1810 Lieutenant Colonel Andreas Samuel Krebs 22.02.1810 - 07.07.1814
- 1814 Lieutenant Colonel Benoni d'Aubert 08.02.1814 - 18.09.1817

           Acting: Colonel Andreas Samuel Krebs 01.06.1815 - 18.09.1817

- 1817 Lieutenant Colonel Nicolai Reichswein Huitfeldt 19.09.1817 - 16.10.1835

           Acting: Lieutenant Colonel Magnus Chr. Fritzner 17.10.1835 - 21.06.1836
           Acting: Captain Lars Bierkebæk 22.06.1836 - 21.03.1837

- 1837 Colonel Wilhelm Sissener 22.03.1837 - 29.12.1846

           Acting: Captain Hans Jacob Fisher 30.12.1846 - 09.07.1847

- 1847 Colonel Peder Bernhard Anker 10.07.1847 - 13.06.1849

           Acting: Captain Frederik D. Werenskiold 14.06.1849 -05.09.1849

- 1849 Major General Erik Theodor Anker 06.09.1849 -24.08.1858

           Acting: Captain Frederik D. Werenskiold 1.10.1849 - 30.03.1850
           Acting: Riding Master Carsten Anker 25.08.1858 -04.03.1859

- 1859 Captain Frederik Daniel Werenskiold 05.03.1859 - 13.04.1878
- 1878 Lieutenant Colonel Jonas Severin Dessen 14.04.1878 - 31.10.1882
- 1882 Lieutenant Colonel Christopher Frederik Lowsow 01.11.1882 - 19.01.1883

           Acting: Captain Hans Christian Schjorn 20.01.1893 - 31.05.1893

- 1893 Captain Hans Christian Schjorn 01.06.1893 - 17.07.1897

           Acting: Captain W.Gran 14.07.1897 - 31.10.1897

- 1897 Captain Theodor Emil Lefevre Grimsgaard 01.11.1897 - 30.09.1902
- 1902 Captain Theodor Flindt Ellerhausen 01.10.1902 - 13.11.1897

           Acting: Captain Theodor L. Grimsgaard. 01.10.1902 - 31.01.1903¨
           Acting: Captain Georg Prahl Harbitz 14.05.1909 - 12.07.1909

- 1912 Captain Georg Marenius Gottlieb Erdmann 14.11.1912 - 30.09.1930

           Acting: Captain Kristian Emil Gloersen 01.07.1929 - 14.08.1929
           Acting: Captain Trygve Larsen 15.08.1929 - 31.12.1930

- 1931 Major Kristian Emil Gloersen 01.01.1931 - 11.11.1935
- 1935 Major Einar Hoch-Nielsen 12.11.1935 - 16-04.1940

           Acting: Major K.E. Gloersen 12.11.1935 - 01.01.1936

- 1940 Acting: The Ortskommandant 17.04.1940 -07.05.1945
- 1945

   Acting: The Home Forces Rolf Syversen 08.05.1945 - 31.07.1945
           Acting: The Home forces Helge Andersen 01.08.1945 - 31.12.1945

- 1946 Lieutenant Colonel Einar Haganæs 01.01.1946 - 26.03.1946

           Acting: Captain H.Lien 27.03.1946 - 31.07.1946

- 1946 Major Gunnar Gundersen 01.08.1946 - 26.03.1946

           Acting: Captain Endre Einum 01.01.1949 - 14.05.1950

- 1950 Major Hans Kvernsjoli 15.05.1950 - 01.04.1953

           Acting:Captain Endre Einum 15.05.1950 - 02.06.1950
           Acting: Captain Endre Einum 01.01.1951 - 30.06.1951
           Acting: Captain Endre Einum 01.01.1953 - 13.07.1953

- 1953 Major Arne Sekkelsten 14.07.1953 - 31.03.1955

           Acting: Captain Thomas Julsrud 01.04.1955 - 14.12.1955

- 1955 Major Johannes Orderud 15.12.1955 - 30.08.1958

           Acting: Captain Thomas Julsrud 01.09.1958 - 31.07.1959

- 1959 Colonel Asle T. Hauglie 01.08.1959 - 04.10.1959
- 1959 Lieutenant Colonel Bertel Bøhnsmoen 05.10.1959 - 29.11.1974
- 1974 Lieutenant Colonel Jostein Skaslien 30.11.1974 - 03.08.1978
- 1978 Lieutenant Colonel Erling Strom 04.08.1978 - 30.11.1979

           Acting: Captain Sverre Holth 01.12.1979 - 21.02.1980

- 1980 Lieutenant Colonel Helge Skaar 22.02.1980- 30.11.1987

           Acting: Major Kjell Joramo 12.09.1984 - 06.01.1986
           Acting: Major Kjell Joramo 18.08.1986 -31.12.1986

- 1987 Lieutenant Colonel Odd Ivar Ruud 01.12.1987 - 31.07.1991
- 1991 Lieutenant Colonel Jimmy Søland 01.08.1991 - 31.07.1998

           Acting: Reidar Halvorsen 14.12.1995 - 07.02.1997

- 1998 Lieutenant Colonel Helge Thomassen 01.08.1998 - 31.07.2005
- 2005 Major Grethe Bergersen 01.08.2005 - 31.07.2010

           Acting: Lieutenant Colonel Helge Thomassen 01.08.2005 - 31.01.2007

- 2010 Lieutenant Colonel John Petter Bachke 01.08.2010 - 31.07.2015
- 2016 Lieutenant Colonel Johnny Sørloth 01.08.2016 - 31.12.2018

           Acting: Major Arnstein Hestnes 01.01.2019 - 12.08.2019

- 2019 Lieutenant Colonel Arnstein Hestnes 13.08.2019 -
