= Kongsvinger (town) =

Town in Innlandet, Norway

- Town/City
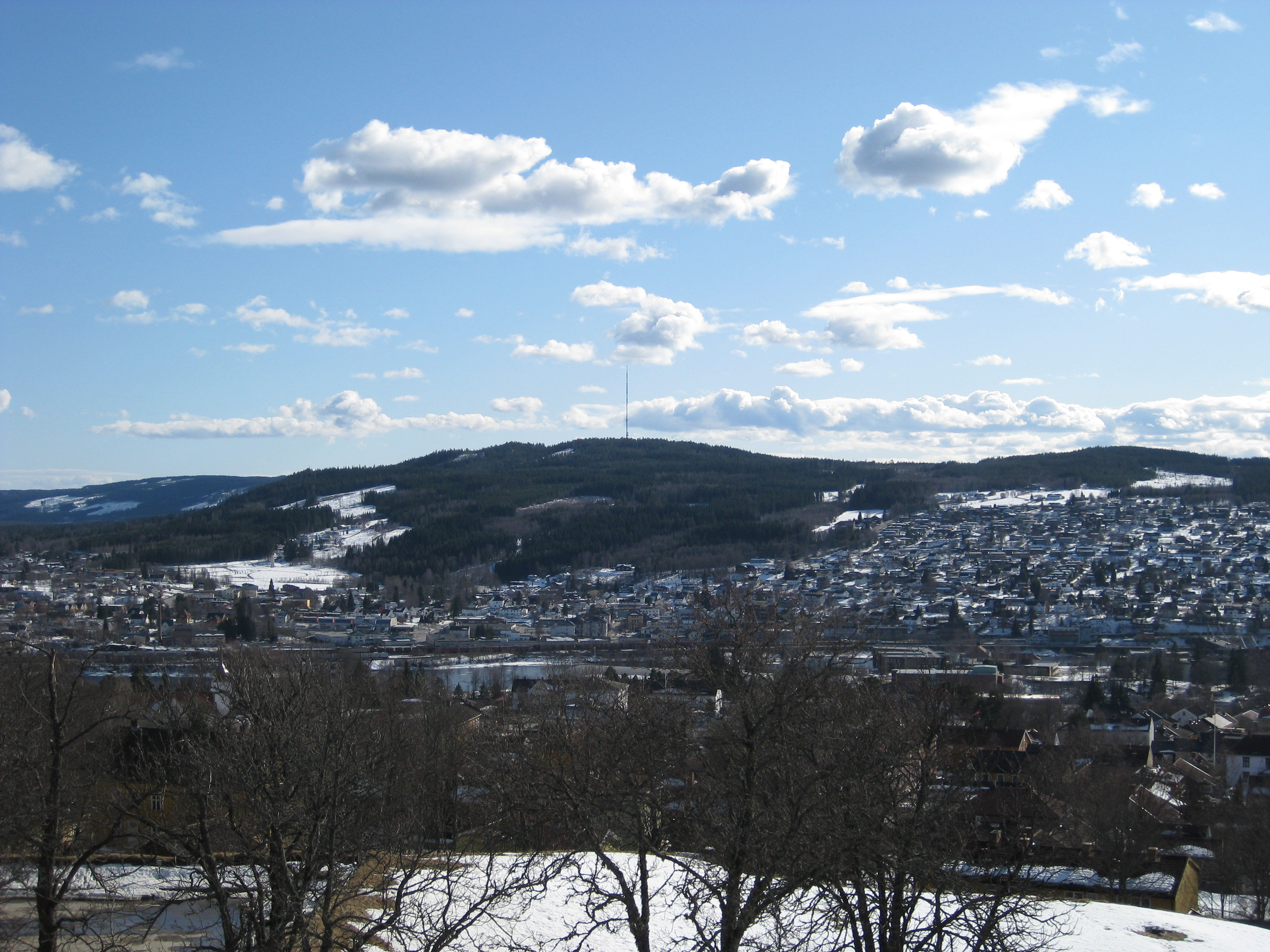
- View of the town

- Coat of arms
- Interactive map of Kongsvinger
- Location within Innlandet Location within Norway
- Coordinates: 60.19048°N 11.99772°E
- Country: Norway
- Region: Eastern Norway
- County: Innlandet
- District: Vinger
- Municipality: Kongsvinger Municipality
- Established as
- Kjøpstad: 1854

Area
  - Total: 8.27 km^{2} (3.19 sq mi)
- Elevation: 149 m (489 ft)

Population (2024)
  - Total: 12,443
  - Density: 1,505/km^{2} (3,900/sq mi)
- Time zone: UTC+01:00 (CET)
  - Summer (DST): UTC+02:00 (CEST)
- Post Code: 2212 Kongsvinger

Kongsvinger is a town located within Kongsvinger Municipality in Innlandet county, Norway. The town is the administrative centre of the municipality. It is located along the river Glomma, about 80 kilometres (50 mi) northeast of the city of Oslo and about 90 kilometres (56 mi) south of the town of Elverum. The town is about 30 kilometres (19 mi) from the border with Sweden.

The 8.27-square-kilometre (2,040-acre) town has a population (2024) of 12,443 and a population density of 1,505 inhabitants per square kilometre (3,900/sq mi).

The downtown area of Kongsvinger has a new public library and a town square. There are also plans for a new hotel to be built in conjunction to the refurbishment of the downtown area as well as for the construction of two new shopping centres. These plans are part of the overall strategy of the municipal council to make Kongsvinger more attractive to tourists and potential new residents.

== History ==
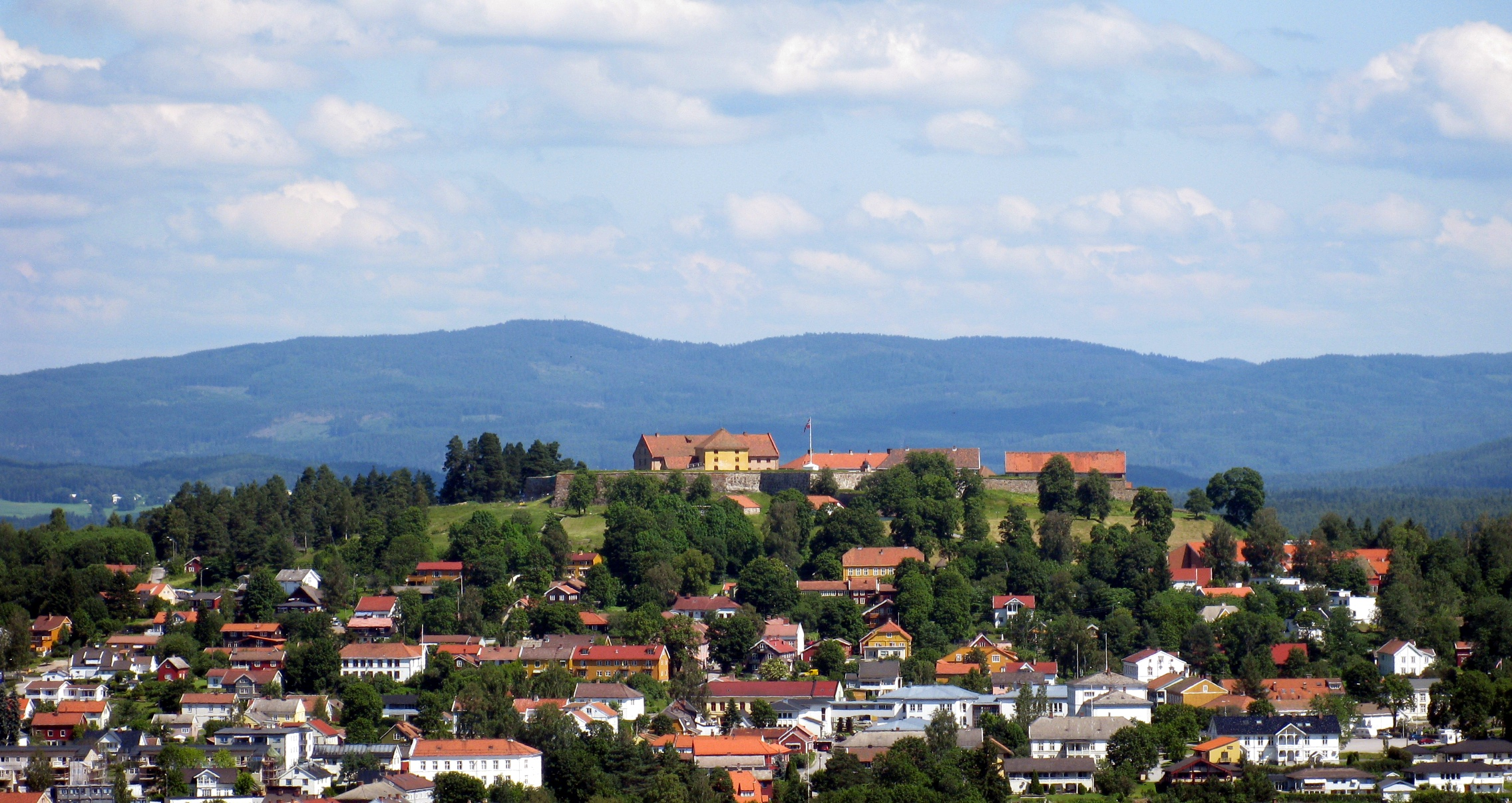
View of the fortress on top of the hill (c. 2011).

Kongsvinger already existed as a trading center by the Middle Ages, due to the accessibility by natural waterways. Viking chieftains reached Sweden by boat from Kongsvinger. Kongsvinger Fortress was founded in 1669, and a star-shaped plan was laid out for the fortress. Work began in 1682 and it was finished in 1690 as part of a general upgrade to Norwegian fortresses. The building of the fortress formed the foundations for what was to become the town of Kongsvinger. The fortress was built as a defensive structure against the Swedes, and on numerous occasions there have been military engagements in the area around the fortress, but Kongsvinger fortress has never been taken in military combat. Below Kongsvinger fortress lies Øvrebyen, which literally translated means "upper town". This is the oldest part of the town of Kongsvinger, and one can still find a number of the original houses built after the establishment of the fortress. Kongsvinger Museum is located here, together with a museum of female emancipation in a building called "Rolighed", the home of Dagny Juel, the famous author once portrayed by Edvard Munch. (Øvrebyen was designated as an area of special historical interest in 1973.) The Øvrebyen area around the fortress is dominated by wooden buildings from the 18th and 19th centuries, laid out in the typical right angle square plan that was designed by the architect Johan Caspar von Cicignon which was very popular in this period.

In 1854, the King designated the market town of Kongsvinger as a kjøpstad, which gave it special rights. Because of this designation, on 7 February 1855, the town was separated from Vinger Municipality to form a separate Kongsvinger Municipality. Initially, the town had 472 residents and this left Vinger Municipality with 10,947 residents. On 1 January 1876, the town was enlarged when an area of Vinger Municipality (population: 209) was transferred into Kongsvinger.

Kongsvinger played an important part in the Norwegian resistance force against the Nazis being a gateway to Sweden. Norway's highest decorated citizen, Gunnar Sønsteby frequently passed through Kongsvinger in his work to sabotage the Nazis' installations in Norway. Some of the busiest escape routes for refugees also went through Kongsvinger to Sweden.

During the 1960s, there were many municipal mergers across Norway due to the work of the Schei Committee. On 1 January 1964, a merger of the following areas took place and together they formed the new Kongsvinger Municipality.

- the town of Kongsvinger (population: 2,345)
- Vinger Municipality (population: 6,257)
- Brandval Municipality (population: 4,384)

From 1983 to 1999, and again in 2010, Kongsvinger's association football team KIL Toppfotball held a position in the Norwegian Premier League. It made some notable merits participating in the UEFA Cup and winning a silver medal during the 1992 season.

=== Name ===
The whole region where Kongsvinger is located was historically called Vinger (Old Norse: Vingr). This name could be related to the river Glomma which flows through the region. One could compare this to the English word swing (for the missing s see Indo-European s-mobile). The river Glomma passes through the center of the district where the south-flowing river takes a sharp northwestward turn. This can be compared to the similar Lithuanian word vìngis which means "bend", "bow", or "turn". This old name used to represent this whole area. The first element of the name Kongs- (meaning "the King's") was added after the Kongsvinger Fortress was built in 1690. It was first applied only to the fortress (written as Königs Winger in old documents). Then, it was later given to the town that grew up around it.

=== Coat of arms ===
The town's coat of arms was granted on 25 June 1926. The arms show the Kongsvinger Fortress in gray on a black hill with a red background. Below the fortress is a white line representing the Glomma river. The fortress is of historical importance to the area. The red and white colors were chosen because they are on the Norwegian flag. After the merger in 1964, the coats of arms was adopted for use by the new Kongsvinger Municipality.

== Economy ==
There are 1,530 businesses including forestry and farming, and 245 of these are retail outlets. There are 25,000 square metres (269,098 ft^{2}) of mall situated in the downtown area. As well as downtown shopping streets, there are also glass domed pedestrian shopping streets. The governmental regional Kongsvinger Hospital is also situated in Kongsvinger.

== Subdivisions ==
The town of Kongsvinger is divided into several informal subdivisions:

- Digerudlia
- Gjemselund
- Glåmlia
- Hexumløkka
- Holt
- Kurudlia
- Langeland
- Langerudberget
- Midtbyen
- Rasta
- Skriverskogen
- Stasjonssida
- Tråstad
- Vangen
- Vennersberg
- Øvrebyen

== See also ==
- List of towns and cities in Norway
