= List of villages in Innlandet =

This is a list of villages in Innlandet, a county of Norway. Villages which are the administrative centers of their municipality are highlighted in blue and marked with this symbol (†) on this list. The term "villages" refers includes settlements, hamlets, and farm areas in Innlandet county. The list excludes cities located in Innlandet. For other counties see the lists of villages in Norway.

Place	Coordinates	Postal Code	Municipality
Alvdal (†)	62°06′28″N 10°37′51″E	2560	Alvdal
Atna	61°43′51″N 10°49′55″E	2476	Stor-Elvdal
Atnbrua	61°51′04″N 10°14′02″E	2476	Stor-Elvdal
Auma	62°13′16″N 10°39′41″E	2500	Tynset
Aurdal	60°55′28″N 9°24′54″E	2910	Nord-Aurdal
Aust-Torpa	60°57′02″N 10°08′20″E	2881	Nordre Land
Austmarka	60°06′01″N 12°19′17″E	2224	Kongsvinger
Austvatn	60°22′42″N 11°41′34″E	2134	Nord-Odal
Bagn (†)	60°49′21″N 9°33′07″E	2930	Sør-Aurdal
Bakkebygde	61°01′38″N 9°41′05″E	2890	Etnedal
Barkald	61°59′46″N 10°52′09″E	2560	Alvdal
Begna bruk	60°38′39″N 9°52′44″E	2937	Sør-Aurdal
Begnadalen	60°38′52″N 9°46′54″E	2936	Sør-Aurdal
Beitostølen	61°14′55″N 8°54′22″E	2953	Øystre Slidre
Bekkelaget	60°46′26″N 11°06′58″E	2312	Stange
Bergeberget	61°00′18″N 11°47′01″E	2410	Elverum
Bergesida	60°27′18″N 12°05′59″E	2260	Grue
Bergset (†)	61°53′29″N 11°04′40″E	2485	Rendalen
Bilitt	60°40′18″N 10°54′20″E	2850	Østre Toten
Bismo (†)	61°53′03″N 8°16′00″E	2690	Skjåk
Biri	60°57′20″N 10°36′41″E	2836	Gjøvik
Biri Øverbygd	60°58′22″N 10°26′20″E	2836	Gjøvik
Bjoneroa	60°31′28″N 10°17′03″E	3522	Gran
Bjorli	62°15′29″N 8°12′21″E	2669	Lesja
Bjølset	60°47′32″N 11°41′31″E	2406	Elverum
Bjølstad	61°45′42″N 9°17′14″E	2676	Sel
Bjørgo	60°52′0″N 9°31′0″E	2910	Nord-Aurdal
Bjørnstadmoen	59°59′0″N 12°5′0″E	2230	Eidskog
Blikberget	61°7′0″N 11°37′0″E	2450	Åmot
Blæstra (Blestergrendi)	60°4′0″N 9°5′0″E	2660	Dovre
Brandbu	60°26′0″N 10°28′0″E	2760	Gran
Brandval	60°19′0″N 12°1′0″E	2219	Kongsvinger
Braskereidfoss	60°43′0″N 11°47′0″E	2435	Våler
Brekkom	61°28′0″N 10°14′0″E	2634	Ringebu
Bruflat (†)	60°53′0″N 9°37′0″E	2890	Etnedal
Brumunddal (†)	60°53′0″N 10°56′0″E	2380	Ringsaker
Bruvoll	60°26′26″N 11°30′37″E	2123	Nord-Odal
Brydalen	62°11′12″N 10°59′25″E	2500	Tynset
Bråstadbrua	60°49′25″N 10°40′06″E	2825	Gjøvik
Brøttum	61°01′43″N 10°33′11″E	2372	Ringsaker
Buflogrenda (Bufloen)	61°21′44″N 12°14′38″E	2420	Trysil
Bybrua	60°48′10″N 10°34′51″E	2822	Gjøvik
Byflaten	60°55′11″N 10°54′20″E	2380	Ringsaker
Bødalen	61°12′01″N 10°08′53″E	2653	Gausdal
Børrud	59°59′0″N 12°5′0″E	2232	Eidskog
Bøverbru	60°39′55″N 10°40′24″E	2846	Vestre Toten
Dale	61°47′0″N 9°30′0″E	2670	Sel
Dalholen	62°10′27″N 9°49′04″E	2582	Folldal
Dalsbygda	62°31′40″N 11°06′31″E	2552	Os
Dalsjordet	61°52′11.43″N 10°41′48.98″E	2825	Gjøvik
Deset	61°18′0″N 11°29′0″E	2450	Åmot
Disenå	60°12′0″N 11°39′0″E	2114	Sør-Odal
Dokka (†)	60°50′0″N 10°5′0″E	2870	Nordre Land
Drevsjø	61°53′24″N 12°01′44″E	2443	Engerdal
Dombås	62°5′0″N 9°8′0″E	2660	Dovre
Dovre (†)	61°1′0″N 9°14′0″E	2662	Dovre
Dovreskogen	60°52′0″N 9°31′0″E	2663	Dovre
Dælibygda	60°50′58″N 10°00′09″E	2870	Nordre Land
Egge	60°26′23″N 10°30′05″E	2760	Gran
Eina	60°38′0″N 10°36′0″E	2843	Vestre Toten
Einastranda	60°33′48″N 10°37′16″E	2843	Vestre Toten
Elgå	62°10′01″N 11°56′34″E	2446	Engerdal
Eltdalen	61°29′0″N 11°56′0″E	2430	Trysil
Elvål	61°55′0″N 11°4′0″E	2485	Rendalen
Enger	60°34′0″N 10°21′0″E	2866	Søndre Land
Engerdal (†)	61°45′33″N 11°57′34″E	2440	Engerdal
Engerdalssætra	61°48′41″N 11°55′01″E	2440	Engerdal
Espa	60°34′46″N 11°16′15″E	2338	Stange
Espedalen	61°22′36″N 9°38′31″E	2658	Gausdal
Espelibygdi	60°55′13″N 9°36′48″E	2890	Etnedal
Fagerlund	61°0′0″N 10°2′0″E	2880	Nordre Land
Fagernes (†)	60°59′0″N 9°15′0″E	2900	Nord-Aurdal
Fageråsen	61°19′37″N 12°08′40″E	2420	Trysil
Fall	60°41′0″N 10°22′0″E	2864	Søndre Land
Faukstad	61°42′39″N 9°25′23″E	2677	Sel
Flisa (†)	60°36′47″N 12°00′38″E	2270	Åsnes
Fluberg	60°46′0″N 10°15′0″E	2862	Søndre Land
Folldal (†)	62°8′0″N 10°3′0″E	2580	Folldal
Follebu	61°14′0″N 10°17′0″E	2656	Gausdal
Forset	61°12′0″N 10°9′0″E	2653	Gausdal
Fossbergom (Lom) (†)	61°50′0″N 8°34′0″E	2686	Lom
Frya	61°33′0″N 10°3′0″E	2647	Sør-Fron
Fåberg	61°10′06″N 10°24′17″E	2625	Lillehammer
Fådalen	62°18′0″N 10°37′0″E	2500	Tynset
Fåset	62°16′0″N 10°40′0″E	2500	Tynset
Fåvang	61°27′19″N 10°11′41″E	2632	Ringebu
Galdesanden (Bøverdal)	61°43′0″N 8°21′0″E	2687	Lom
Galterud	60°10′59″N 11°53′10″E	2223	Sør-Odal
Garmo	61°50′55″N 8°48′21″E	2685	Lom
Gaupen	60°52′0″N 10°46′0″E	2355	Ringsaker
Gillundstranda	60°42′39″N 11°06′17″E	2335	Stange
Gjermshus	60°8′0″N 12°6′0″E	2210	Kongsvinger
Gjesåsen	60°40′46″N 12°01′35″E	2280	Åsnes
Gjota	62°05′28″N 11°39′19″E	2448	Engerdal
Gran	60°22′0″N 10°34′0″E	2750	Gran
Granrudmoen (†)	61°14′49″N 10°26′34″E	2636	Øyer
Gravberget	60°52′0″N 12°15′0″E	2438	Våler
Grimsbu	62°09′22″N 10°10′23″E	2584	Folldal
Grinder	60°23′0″N 12°3′0″E	2264	Grue
Grotli	62°00′49″N 7°37′49″E	2695	Skjåk
Grymyr	60°20′28″N 10°24′24″E	2750	Gran
Hagaroa	60.8224°N 11.5965°E	2406	Elverum
Hanestad	61°50′0″N 10°53′0″E	2478	Rendalen
Harpefoss	61°35′0″N 9°51′0″E	2647	Sør-Fron
Haslemoen	60°43′0″N 11°47′0″E	2437	Våler
Hedalen	60°37′0″N 9°42′0″E	3528	Sør-Aurdal
Hekne	60°44′11″N 11°21′43″E	2332	Stange
Hegge	61°09′35″N 9°00′48″E	2940	Øystre Slidre
Heggenes (†)	61°9′0″N 9°5′0″E	2940	Øystre Slidre
Heggeriset	61°40′41″N 12°00′19″E	2440	Engerdal
Heimdal	60°52′13″N 11°22′16″E	2340	Løten
Hennung	60°30′0″N 10°31′0″E	2760	Gran
Heradsbygd	60°49′0″N 11°38′0″E	2415	Elverum
Hernes	60°13′0″N 11°51′0″E	2410	Elverum
Hippesbygdi	61°00′15″N 9°02′53″E	2918	Nord-Aurdal
Hjellum	60°47′0″N 11°9′0″E	2322	Hamar
Hjerkinn	60°13′0″N 9°32′0″E	2661	Dovre
Hodalen	62°21′44″N 11°11′49″E	2540	Tolga
Hof	60°33′0″N 12°1′0″E	2266	Åsnes
Hokkåsen	60°17′0″N 12°7′0″E	2217	Kongsvinger
Holsætra	60°07′42″N 12°13′55″E	2220	Eidskog
Horndalen	60°58′18″N 11°39′01″E	2410	Elverum
Hov (†)	60°42′0″N 10°21′0″E	2860	Søndre Land
Hugulia	61°02′01″N 9°50′13″E	2880	Nordre Land
Hunderfossen	61°13′38″N 10°26′07″E	2625	Lillehammer
Hundorp/Lia (†)	61°33′0″N 9°54′0″E	2647	Sør-Fron
Hunndalen	60°47′0″N 10°38′0″E	2827	Gjøvik
Hylleråsen	61°38′04″N 12°01′44″E	2440	Engerdal
Håmålvoll	62°26′50″N 11°07′30″E	2550	Os
Hænsgardane	61°10′04″N 8°40′36″E	2975	Vang
Høvringen	61°54′0″N 9°29′0″E	2673	Sel
Ilseng	60°46′0″N 11°13′0″E	2344	Stange; Hamar
Imsroa	61°27′56″N 11°01′27″E	2480	Stor-Elvdal
Ingeberg	60°49′42″N 11°08′12″E	2323	Hamar
Innbygda (†)	61°19′0″N 12°16′0″E	2420	Trysil
Jammerdal	60°33′23″N 12°04′11″E	2266	Åsnes
Jaren (†)	60°23′0″N 10°33′0″E	2770	Gran
Jordet	61°25′0″N 12°9′0″E	2430	Trysil
Jølstad	60°50′0″N 10°46′0″E	2355	Ringsaker
Jømna	60°48′0″N 11°40′0″E	2416	Elverum
Jønsrud	60°52′12″N 11°22′21″E	2340	Løten
Jørstadmoen	61°08′44″N 10°23′04″E	2617	Lillehammer
Kapp	60°42′51″N 10°51′28″E	2849	Østre Toten
Kilen	60°40′0″N 12°13′0″E	2283	Åsnes
Kirkenær (†)	60°28′0″N 12°3′0″E	2260	Grue
Kjellmyra	60°39′0″N 12°2′0″E	2280	Åsnes
Kleivgardsbygdi	60°53′09″N 9°40′26″E	2890	Etnedal
Knapper	60°28′0″N 11°37′0″E	2130	Nord-Odal
Kolbu	60°37′0″N 10°46′0″E	2847	Østre Toten
Koppang (†)	61°34′0″N 11°4′0″E	2480	Stor-Elvdal
Krokhaugen	62°8′0″N 10°3′0″E	2580	Folldal
Kvam	61°40′0″N 9°42′0″E	2642	Nord-Fron
Kverndalskroken	60°48′06″N 10°06′29″E	2870	Nordre Land
Kvernstubrua	60°56′52″N 10°46′03″E	2390	Ringsaker
Kvisla (Kvilten)	61°50′49″N 12°00′56″E	2443	Engerdal
Kvikne	61°34′24″N 9°35′45″E	2640	Nord-Fron
Kvisler	60°33′0″N 11°59′0″E	2266	Åsnes
Kvål	60°51′24″N 11°01′00″E	2320	Ringsaker
Kylstad	60°52′27″N 11°02′27″E	2320	Ringsaker
Kåsa	62°16′12″N 11°23′24″E	2540	Tolga
Lalm	61°49′0″N 9°16′0″E	2682	Vågå
Landåsbygda	60°49′59″N 10°17′41″E	2861	Søndre Land
Leira	60°58′0″N 9°18′0″E	2920	Nord-Aurdal
Leirflaten	61°43′59″N 9°10′16″E	2676	Sel
Lena (†)	61°40′0″N 10°48′0″E	2850	Østre Toten
Lensbygda	60°38′41″N 10°50′29″E	2850	Østre Toten
Lesja (†)	62°07′06″N 8°51′51″E	2665	Lesja
Lesjaskog	62°13′58″N 8°21′23″E	2668	Lesja
Lesjaverk	62°11′32″N 8°32′26″E	2667	Lesja
Lismarka	61°04′15″N 10°37′26″E	2616	Ringsaker
Lillo	60°40′58″N 10°49′44″E	2850	Østre Toten
Ljørdal	61°23′0″N 12°42′0″E	2425	Trysil
Loengbygda	60°51′40″N 10°00′22″E	2870	Nordre Land
Lomen	61°07′58″N 8°53′27″E	2967	Vestre Slidre
Lora	62°08′33″N 8°41′54″E	2666	Lesja
Lundagrendi	61°52′25″N 8°17′33″E	2690	Skjåk
Lundersæter	60°17′53″N 12°16′33″E	2218	Kongsvinger
Lutnes	61°4′0″N 12°37′0″E	2427	Trysil
Lygna	60°27′27″N 10°38′44″E	2770	Gran
Løten (†)	60°49′0″N 11°19′0″E	2340	Løten
Magnor	59°57′0″N 12°12′0″E	2240	Eidskog
Marlo	61°52′53″N 8°23′26″E	2690	Skjåk
Matrand	60°2′0″N 12°8′0″E	2235	Eidskog
Melåsberget	60°49′26″N 11°43′18″E	2416	Elverum
Mesnali	61°06′10″N 10°41′56″E	2610	Ringsaker
Mo (Gardvik)	60°25′41″N 11°38′24″E	2133	Nord-Odal
Moane	61°07′31″N 9°05′44″E	2940	Øystre Slidre
Moelv	60°56′0″N 10°42′0″E	2390	Ringsaker
Mogrenda	61°46′56″N 10°30′00″E	2476	Stor-Elvdal
Musdalen	61°17′51″N 10°16′01″E	2635	Øyer
Mykleby	61°25′18″N 11°04′28″E	2480	Stor-Elvdal
Mysusæter	61°48′0″N 9°41′0″E	2674	Sel
Namnå	60°30′01″N 12°04′42″E	2265	Grue
Narbuvoll	62°21′16″N 11°28′03″E	2550	Os
Nedre Svatsum	61°19′11″N 9°51′35″E	2657	Gausdal
Nord-Sel (Sel)	61°50′28″N 9°24′32″E	2672	Sel
Nord-Torpa	61°00′32″N 9°55′20″E	2880	Nordre Land
Nordberg	61°54′21″N 8°09′16″E	2693	Skjåk
Nordherad	61°51′54″N 9°01′00″E	2680	Vågå
Nordlia	60°44′30″N 10°45′43″E	2816	Østre Toten
Nordre Lii	61°52′10″N 8°40′10″E	2686	Lom
Nordre Ålsbygd	60°22′27″N 10°37′18″E	2750	Gran
Nordskogbygda	60°59′38″N 11°41′59″E	2410	Elverum
Nordsæter	61°11′0″N 10°38′0″E	2618	Lillehammer
Nybergsund	61°15′0″N 12°19′0″E	2422	Trysil
Nybygda	60°55′36″N 11°01′47″E	2380	Ringsaker
Nydal	60°50′45″N 11°02′35″E	2320	Ringsaker
Nymoen	61°40′06″N 11°47′04″E	2440	Engerdal
Nytrøa	62°23′0″N 10°28′0″E	2500	Tynset
Næroset	60°58′0″N 10°47′0″E	2364	Ringsaker
Odals Verk	60°15′0″N 11°52′0″E	2116	Sør-Odal
Odnes	60°48′0″N 10°12′0″E	2879	Søndre Land
Oppegård	60°44′19″N 11°29′46″E	2340	Løten
Opphus	61°20′0″N 11°16′0″E	2480	Stor-Elvdal
Oppstad	60°17′15″N 11°40′12″E	2101	Sør-Odal
Os i Østerdalen (†)	62°29′47″N 11°13′24″E	2550	Os
Osneset/Nordre Osen	61°18′06″N 11°45′43″E	2460	Åmot
Otnes	61°45′35″N 11°10′19″E	2485	Rendalen
Ottestad	60°44′0″N 11°9′0″E	2312	Stange
Plassen	62°8′0″N 10°33′0″E	2427	Trysil
Plassmoen (Plassen)	62°06′40″N 10°33′30″E	2560	Alvdal
Ranheimsbygdi	60°59′38″N 9°15′08″E	2900	Nord-Aurdal
Randsverk	61°44′0″N 9°5′0″E	2683	Vågå
Rasta	61°23′56″N 11°08′42″E	2480	Stor-Elvdal
Raufoss (†)	60°43′0″N 10°37′0″E	2830	Vestre Toten
Redalen	60°53′0″N 10°40′0″E	2836	Gjøvik
Reinli	60°50′0″N 9°30′0″E	2933	Sør-Aurdal
Reinsvoll	60°41′0″N 10°37′0″E	2840	Vestre Toten
Rena (†)	61°8′0″N 11°22′0″E	2450	Åmot
Ridabu	60°48′05″N 11°07′50″E	2322	Hamar
Ringebu (†)	61°31′0″N 10°10′0″E	2630	Ringebu
Ringelia	60°38′33″N 10°19′54″E	2860	Søndre Land
Ringstad	60°22′02″N 10°35′22″E	2750	Gran
Risberget	60°27′0″N 11°56′0″E	2260	Grue
Rogne	61°6′0″N 9°8′0″E	2943	Øystre Slidre
Romedal	60°45′0″N 11°16′0″E	2334	Stange
Rotberget	60°31′0″N 12°33′0″E	2256	Grue
Roverud	60°15′0″N 12°3′0″E	2216	Kongsvinger
Rudshøgda	60°54′47″N 10°48′44″E	2360	Ringsaker
Ruskåsen	60°58′24″N 11°17′04″E	2340	Løten
Rust	61°00′00″N 9°36′01″E	2890	Etnedal
Rustad	61°1′0″N 11°24′0″E	2411	Elverum
Ruste	61°34′29″N 9°44′16″E	2640	Nord-Fron
Ryfoss	61°08′18″N 8°49′20″E	2973	Vang
Rølsåsen	60°53′46″N 11°46′11″E	2412	Elverum
Røn	61°02′00″N 9°03′23″E	2960	Vestre Slidre
Røykenvik	60°26′0″N 10°28′0″E	2760	Gran
Sand (Sagstua) (†)	60°23′0″N 11°33′0″E	2120	Nord-Odal
Sandbumoen	61°44′0″N 9°32′0″E	2670	Sel
Sander	60°13′0″N 11°49′0″E	2116	Sør-Odal
Sandvika	60°46′40″N 11°05′39″E	2312	Stange
Segalstad bru (†)	61°14′0″N 10°14′0″E	2651	Gausdal
Selsverket	61°48′0″N 9°35′0″E	2670	Sel
Siljuberget	60°54′30″N 11°58′09″E	2412	Elverum
Sinnerud	60°46′51″N 11°08′48″E	2312	Stange
Sjoa	61°40′44″N 9°33′00″E	2677	Sel
Sjusjøen	61°9′0″N 10°42′0″E	2612	Ringsaker
Sjølisand	61°28′0″N 11°20′0″E	2450	Rendalen
Skammestein	61°12′0″N 9°1′0″E	2950	Øystre Slidre
Skarnes (†)	60°15′0″N 11°41′0″E	2100	Sør-Odal
Skarsroe	61°49′17″N 9°15′31″E	2682	Vågå
Skartlibygda	61°2′0″N 10°5′0″E	2881	Nordre Land
Skasenden	60°26′0″N 12°16′0″E	2260	Grue
Skei	61°20′13″N 10°05′25″E	2652	Gausdal
Skogbygda	60°44′56″N 11°34′24″E	2340	Løten
Skogbygda	61°45′06″N 9°14′12″E	2676	Sel
Skogbygdi	61°51′0″N 9°0′0″E	2680	Vågå
Skotterud (†)	59°59′0″N 12°7′0″E	2230	Eidskog
Skrautvål	61°01′59″N 9°12′32″E	2917	Nord-Aurdal
Skreia	60°39′0″N 10°56′0″E	2848	Østre Toten
Skåbu	61°32′0″N 9°25′0″E	2643	Nord-Fron
Sjøenden	61°06′27″N 11°59′01″E	2428	Trysil
Sletta	60°41′35″N 10°46′36″E	2850	Østre Toten
Slettmoen	60°49′56″N 11°18′29″E	2340	Løten
Slidre (†)	61°05′17″N 8°58′53″E	2966	Vestre Slidre
Slåstad	60°17′0″N 11°46′0″E	2110	Sør-Odal
Smedmoen	60°54′37″N 10°39′43″E	2836	Gjøvik
Smiugardsbygdi	61°03′00″N 9°33′47″E	2890	Etnedal
Snippen	61°09′40″N 11°27′16″E	2450	Åmot
Sollia	61°47′0″N 10°25′0″E	2477	Stor-Elvdal
Sorken	61°58′17″N 11°56′40″E	2443	Engerdal
Stai	61°28′0″N 11°2′0″E	2480	Stor-Elvdal
Stange	60°38′0″N 10°54′0″E	2848	Østre Toten
Stangebyen (†)	60°43′0″N 11°11′0″E	2335	Stange
Starhellinga	60°43′31″N 11°15′58″E	2335	Stange
Starum	60°41′40″N 10°53′41″E	2850	Østre Toten
Stavsjø	60°48′20″N 10°50′20″E	2353	Ringsaker
Steinsetbygdi	61°4′0″N 9°25′0″E	2890	Etnedal
Strandbygda	60°54′51″N 11°32′23″E	2409	Elverum
Strandbygda	61°20′43″N 12°13′21″E	2420	Trysil
Strandlykkja	60°31′0″N 11°15′0″E	2338	Stange
Styggberget	61°01′48″N 11°47′52″E	2410	Elverum
Strømmen	62°12′0″N 10°37′0″E	2560	Alvdal
Svanåsen	60°58′43″N 11°29′26″E	2411	Elverum
Svingvoll	61°17′43″N 10°11′12″E	2652	Gausdal
Svullrya	60°25′0″N 12°24′0″E	2256	Grue
Sønstebygrenda	60°34′0″N 10°34′0″E	2843	Vestre Toten
Sønsterud	60°39′0″N 12°4′0″E	2280	Åsnes
Søre Lii	61°52′23″N 8°45′47″E	2686	Lom
Søre Osen	61°10′22″N 11°54′51″E	2428	Trysil
Søre Ålsbygd	60°20′09″N 10°37′13″E	2750	Gran
Sørroa	60°16′02″N 12°07′10″E	2217	Kongsvinger
Sørskogbygda	60°56′23″N 11°47′29″E	2412	Elverum
Sørstrand	61°23′50″N 10°12′35″E	2634	Ringebu
Tangen	60°37′0″N 11°16′0″E	2337	Stange
Telneset	62°21′0″N 10°54′0″E	2500	Tynset
Tessand	61°51′0″N 8°58′0″E	2683	Vågå
Tingnes (Nes)	60°45′44″N 10°56′29″E	2350	Ringsaker
Tobøl	59°58′19″N 12°03′20″E	2232	Eidskog
Tolga (†)	62°24′32″N 10°59′56″E	2540	Tolga
Totenvik	60°38′43″N 11°00′30″E	2848	Østre Toten
Trautskogen (Traut)	60°27′0″N 11°27′0″E	2123	Nord-Odal
Tretten	61°19′0″N 10°19′0″E	2635	Øyer
Tufsingdal	62°18′21″N 11°43′10″E	2555	Os
Tyinkrysset	61°12′06″N 8°14′04″E	2985	Vang
Tylldalen	62°8′0″N 10°48′0″E	2510	Tynset
Tørberget	61°8′0″N 12°6′0″E	2429	Trysil
Ulnes	61°9′0″N 9°6′0″E	2918	Nord-Aurdal
Unset	61°58′0″N 11°11′0″E	2485	Rendalen
Vallset/Gata	60°42′02″N 11°19′36″E	2330	Stange
Vang i Valdres (†)	61°07′30″N 8°34′15″E	2974/2975	Vang
Vangli	60°48′53″N 11°10′38″E	2324	Hamar
Vangsås/Slemsrud	60°50′49″N 11°12′03″E	2324	Hamar
Vaset	60°59′44″N 8°59′16″E	2950	Vestre Slidre
Veldre	60°54′0″N 10°52′0″E	2380	Ringsaker
Velta	60°38′26″N 12°16′37″E	2283	Åsnes
Venabygd	61°35′0″N 10°3′0″E	2634	Ringebu
Vennis	61°09′04″N 8°33′21″E	2975	Vang
Vermundsjøen	60°42′24″N 12°22′14″E	2283	Åsnes
Vest-Torpa	60°55′19″N 10°04′17″E	2870	Nordre Land
Vestby	61°15′0″N 12°3′0″E	2420	Trysil
Vestmarka	59°56′09″N 11°59′29″E	2233	Eidskog
Vestringsbygdi	60°55′39″N 9°19′18″E	2910	Nord-Aurdal
Vestrumsbygda	60°48′21″N 10°15′56″E	2879	Søndre Land
Vingelen	62°25′02″N 10°51′43″E	2542	Tolga
Vingnes	61°6′0″N 10°27′0″E	2608	Lillehammer
Vingrom	61°02′46″N 10°25′47″E	2607	Lillehammer
Vinstra (†)	61°36′0″N 9°45′0″E	2640	Nord-Fron
Volbu	61°39′18″N 9°13′31″E	2940	Øystre Slidre
Vågåmo (†)	61°53′0″N 9°6′0″E	2680	Vågå
Våler i Solør (†)	60°40′0″N 11°50′0″E	2436	Våler
Yset (Kvikne)	62°34′0″N 10°20′0″E	2512	Tynset
Øksna	60°58′49″N 11°27′44″E	2406	Elverum
Ølsjøbakkan	60°53′0″N 9°13′0″E	2910	Nord-Aurdal
Østby	61°15′0″N 12°32′0″E	2423	Trysil
Øverbygda	60°48′58″N 10°33′01″E	2825	Gjøvik
Øverlibygdi	60°56′22″N 9°38′27″E	2890	Etnedal
Øversjødalen	62°12′32″N 11°28′55″E	2544	Tolga
Øvre Dalen	61°12′20″N 8°21′36″E	2977	Vang
Øvre Svatsum	61°20′25″N 9°46′15″E	2657	Gausdal
Øye	61°10′0″N 8°24′0″E	2977	Vang
Åbjør	60°55′27.81″N 9°17′44.84″E	2910	Nord-Aurdal
Åbogen	60°06′41″N 12°06′58″E	2220	Eidskog
Ådalsbruk/Klevfos	60°47′0″N 11°18′0″E	2345	Løten
Åkre	61°43′0″N 11°12′0″E	2485	Rendalen
Åkrestrømmen	61°41′44″N 11°12′34″E	2485	Rendalen
Åslia	60°35′47″N 12°05′40″E	2266	Åsnes
Åsroa	61°0′26.99″N 10°27′32.91″E	2837	Gjøvik
Åsta	61°04′28″N 11°20′54″E	2450	Åmot
Åsvang	60°43′09″N 11°21′04″E	2332	Stange

== See also ==
- For other counties, see the lists of villages in Norway
