= Løfsgaard =

Løfsgaard is a Norwegian surname. Notable people with the surname include:

- Arne Løfsgaard (1887–1974), Norwegian politician
- Jostein Løfsgaard (1923–2011), Norwegian academic administrator
