= Flisa (disambiguation) =

Flisa may refer to:

== Places ==
- Flisa, a village in Åsnes municipality in Innlandet county, Norway
- Flisa (river), a river in Innlandet county, Norway
- Flisa Station, a railway station in Åsnes municipality in Innlandet county, Norway

== Other ==
- Flisa IL, a sports club in Åsnes municipality in Innlandet county, Norway

== See also ==
- Flyssa
