= Gjesåssjøen =

Lake in Innlandet, Norway

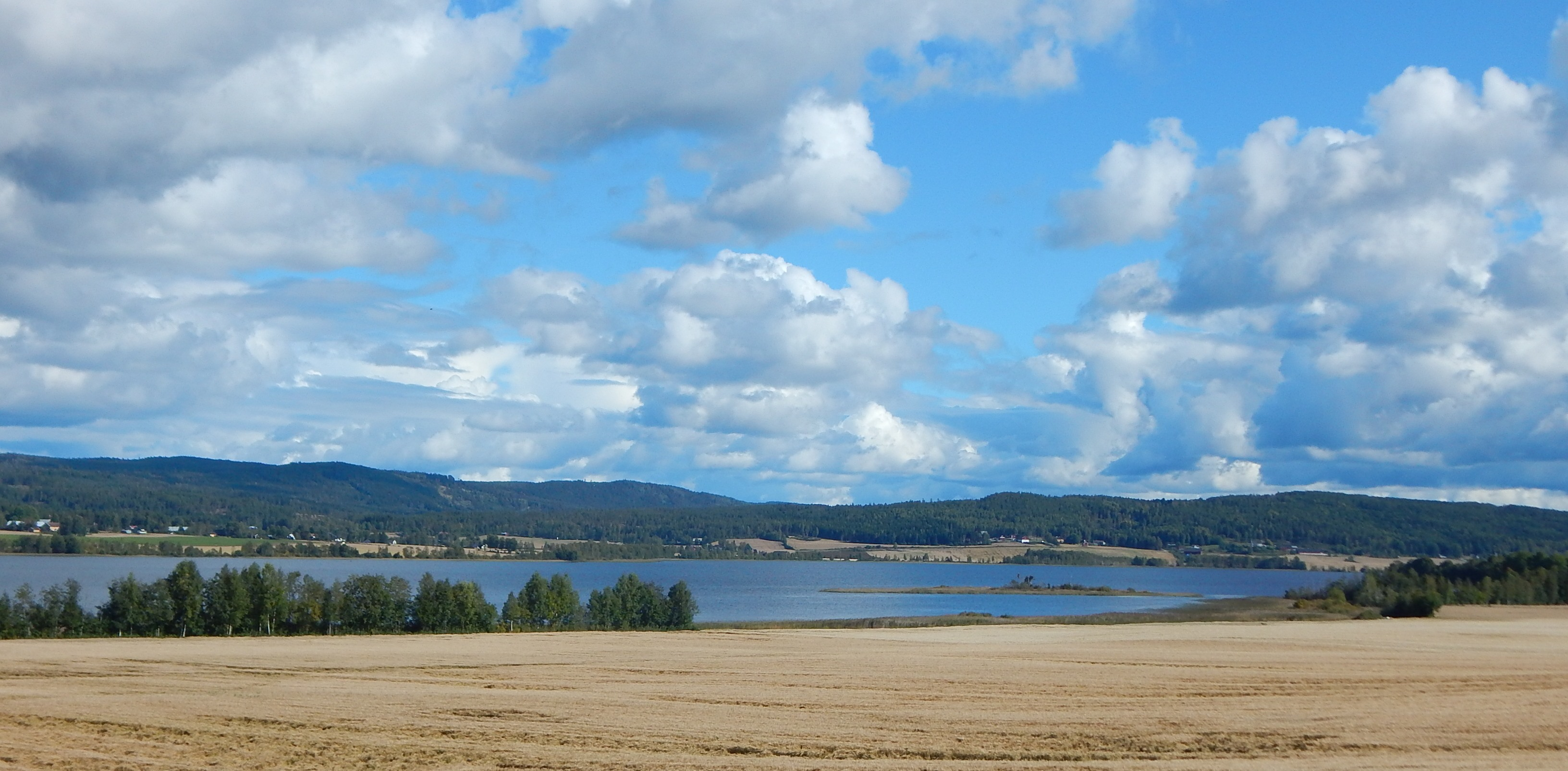
- View of the lake
- Interactive map of the lake
- Location: Åsnes Municipality, Innlandet
- Coordinates: 60°41′1″N 11°59′3″E
- Basin countries: Norway
- Max. length: 3.5 kilometres (2.2 mi)
- Max. width: 1.5 kilometres (0.93 mi)
- Surface area: 4.06 km^{2} (1.57 sq mi)
- Shore length^{1}: 9.49 kilometres (5.90 mi)
- Surface elevation: 176 metres (577 ft)
- References: NVE
- ^{1} Shore length is not a well-defined measure.

Gjesåssjøen is a lake in Åsnes Municipality in Innlandet county, Norway. The 4.06-square-kilometre (1.57 sq mi) lake lies about 5 kilometres (3.1 mi) northwest of the villages of Kjellmyra and Flisa and about 6 kilometres (3.7 mi) east of the village of Våler. The village of Gjesåsen and the Gjesåsen Church lie along the eastern shore of the lake.

The lake was designated as a nature reserve in 2003. The lake is surrounded by agriculture which use the lake as a source of water. Gjesåssjøen is an important habitat for a number of bird species. About 150 different bird species were observed at the lake between 1996 and 2006, among these rare species such as the grebe and the greylag goose.

== See also ==
- List of lakes in Norway
