= Vermunden =

Lake in Innlandet, Norway

Vermunden Vermundsjøen
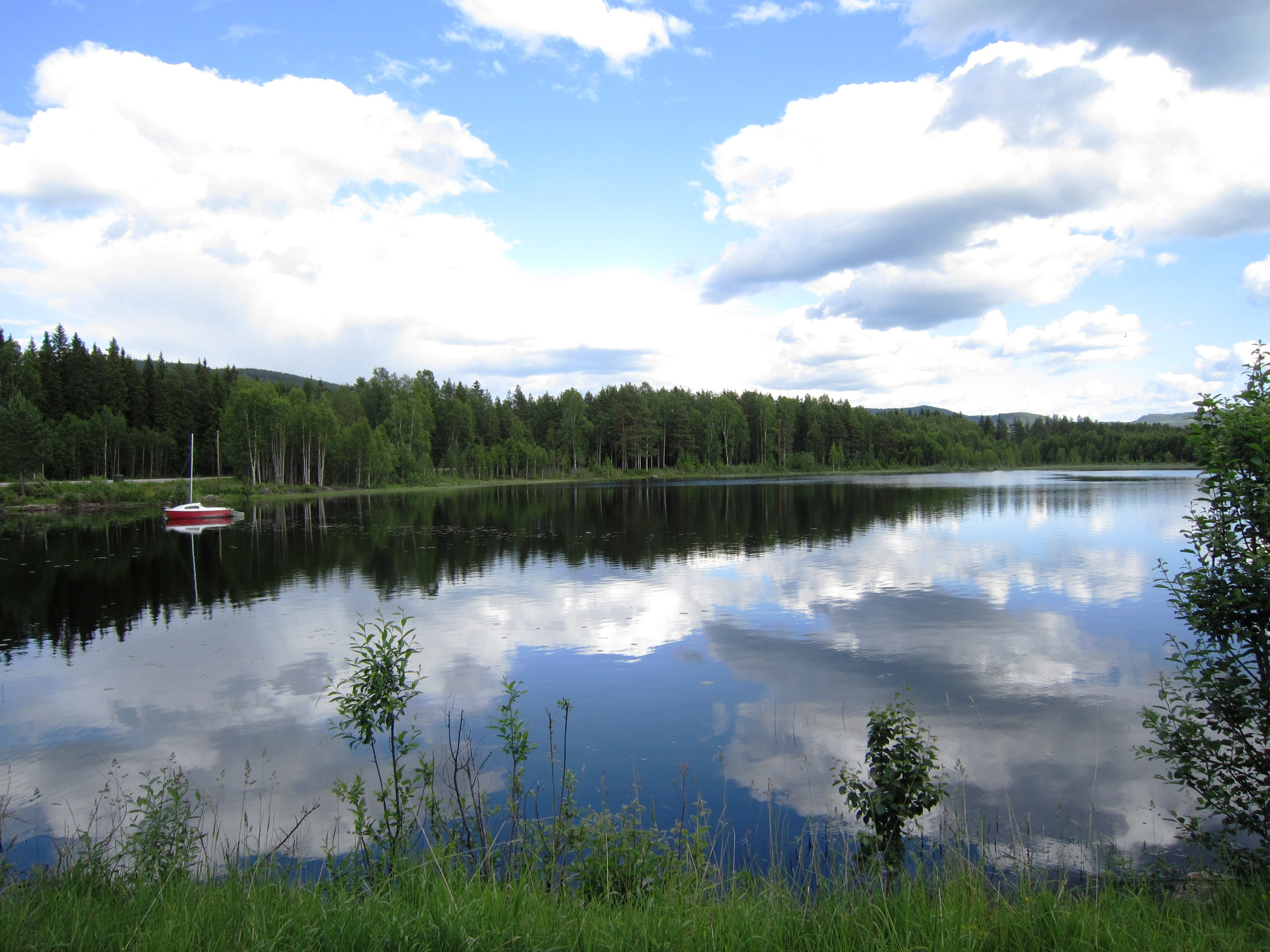
- Lake Vermunden near Åsnes Finnskog Church
- Interactive map of the lake
- Location: Åsnes Municipality, Innlandet
- Coordinates: 60°41′42″N 12°23′13″E
- Primary outflows: Flisa river
- Catchment area: Tyskåa and Medskogsåa rivers
- Basin countries: Norway
- Max. length: 7.3 kilometres (4.5 mi)
- Max. width: 900 metres (3,000 ft)
- Surface area: 3.45 km^{2} (1.33 sq mi)
- Shore length^{1}: 20.68 kilometres (12.85 mi)
- Surface elevation: 215 metres (705 ft)
- References: NVE
- ^{1} Shore length is not a well-defined measure.

Vermunden or Vermundsjøen is a lake in Åsnes Municipality in Innlandet county, Norway. The 3.45-square-kilometre (1.33 sq mi) lake lies in the Finnskogen area, just about 2.5 kilometres (1.6 mi) east of the border with Sweden. The small village of Vermundsjøen lies at the north end of the lake, where Åsnes Finnskog Church is located.

== See also ==
- List of lakes in Norway
