= Jon Gudbjørn Dybendal =

Norwegian politician

Jon Gudbjørn Dybendal (21 September 1904 – 3 May 1985) was a Norwegian politician for the Labour Party.

He was born in Åsnes as a son of smallholders Julius Dybendal (1877-1964) Therese Østhaug (1884-1926). After primary education he held occupations such as carpenter, boat builder and smallholder.

He was elected mayor of Åsnes, serving from 1945 to 1963. As such he was also a member of the county council. He also chaired the school board from 1952 to 1971. On a national level he served as a deputy representative to the Parliament of Norway from the constituency Hedmark during the term 1961–1965. In total he met during 145 days of parliamentary session. He finished his career as office manager in Åsnes Municipality from 1964 to 1973.

Among others he was a board member of Elverum Hospital from 1961 to 1964 and deputy board member for the Bank of Norway branch in Hamar from 1946 to 1966.
