= Ole Bjerke =

Norwegian sport shooter (1881–1959)

Personal information
- Born: 13 April 1881 Åsnes, Norway
- Died: 15 April 1959 (aged 78) Åsnes, Norway

Sport
- Sport: Sports shooting

Ole Bjerke (13 April 1881 – 15 April 1959) was a Norwegian sport shooter. He was born in Åsnes, and his club was Hof Skytterlag. He competed in the military rifle shooting at the 1912 Summer Olympics in Stockholm.
