= Jostein Løfsgaard =

Norwegian academic executive

Fredrik Jostein Løfsgaard (21 September 1923 – 27 May 2011) was a Norwegian academic executive.

He was born in Flisa as a son of Kari and Arne Løfsgaard. He finished his secondary education in 1944 and graduated from university with the cand.jur. degree in 1949. He was a secretary at the Norwegian College of Agriculture and Norges Tannlegehøgskole before being hired as faculty secretary at the University of Oslo. He advanced via the positions of questor (financial executive) and secretary to being assistant university director from 1969. From 1987 to 1988 he served as university director. He was then a special adviser until his retirement in 1993.

He was a board member of the Foundation for Student Life in Oslo from 1980 to 1987, and also of the University of Oslo International Summer School and Regneanlegget Blindern-Kjeller. He has been involved in the crediting of university degrees in the Council of Europe and the Organisation for Economic Co-operation and Development.

He resided in Bekkestua. He died in May 2011.

Academic offices
Preceded by Olav Meidell Trovik	Director of the University of Oslo; 1987–1988	Succeeded by Kjell Stahl
