= List of villages in Norway =

This is a list of lists of villages in Norway, divided into sub-sections by county. The lists consist of populated places without city status.

Akershus	Aust-Agder	Buskerud
Finnmark	Hedmark	Hordaland
Møre og Romsdal	Nordland	Oppland
Oslo	Rogaland	Sogn og Fjordane
Telemark	Troms	Trøndelag
Vest-Agder	Vestfold	Østfold

== See also ==
- List of towns and cities in Norway
