= Sønsterud =

Village in Åsnes Municipality, Norway

- Village
- Interactive map of Sønsterud
- Location within Innlandet Location within Norway
- Coordinates: 60.66158°N 12.06935°E
- Country: Norway
- Region: Eastern Norway
- County: Innlandet
- District: Solør
- Municipality: Åsnes Municipality

Area
  - Total: 0.36 km^{2} (0.14 sq mi)
- Elevation: 203 m (666 ft)

Population (2020)
  - Total: 229
  - Density: 636/km^{2} (1,650/sq mi)
- Time zone: UTC+01:00 (CET)
  - Summer (DST): UTC+02:00 (CEST)
- Post Code: 2280 Gjesåsen

Sønsterud is a village in Åsnes Municipality in Innlandet county, Norway. The village is located about 3 kilometres (1.9 mi) to the southeast of the village of Gjesåsen, about 3 kilometres (1.9 mi) to the northeast of the village of Kjellmyra, and about 6 kilometres (3.7 mi) to the northeast of the village of Flisa. The river Flisa runs just southeast of the village of Sønsterud.

The 0.36-square-kilometre (89-acre) village had a population (2020) of 229 and a population density of 636 inhabitants per square kilometre (1,650/sq mi). Since 2020, the population and area data for this village area has not been separately tracked by Statistics Norway.

== Media gallery ==
Old photos of Sønsterud

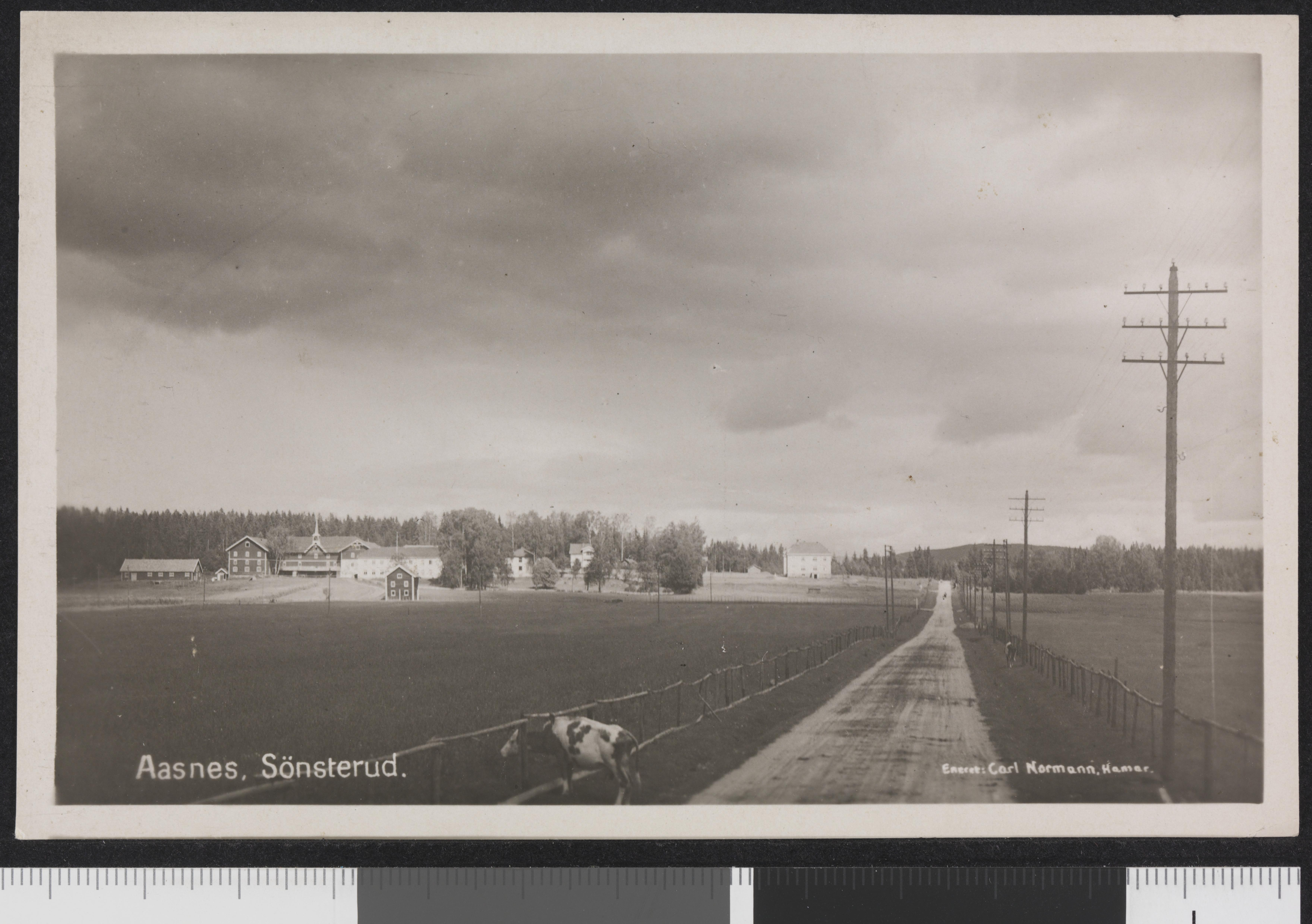

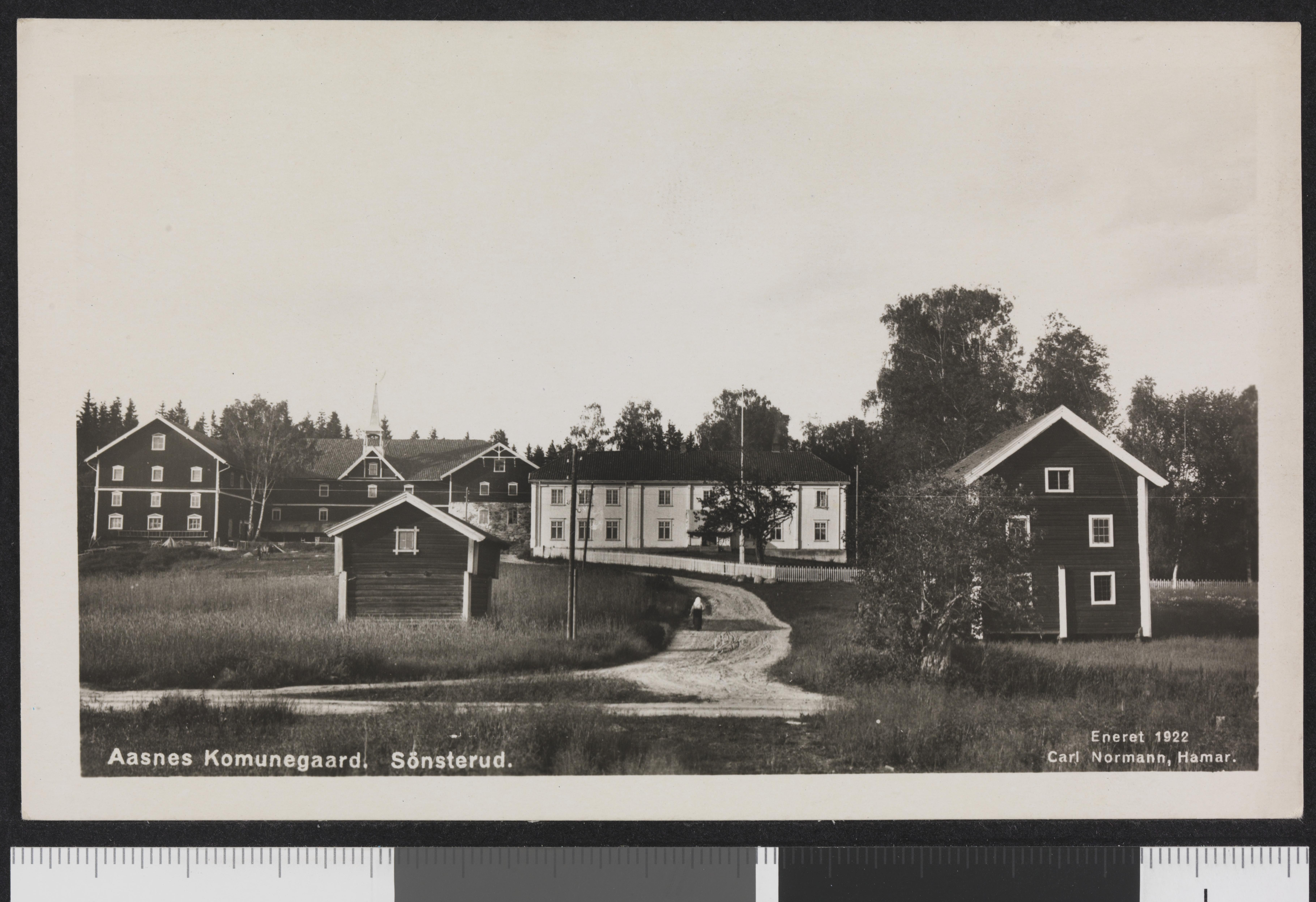

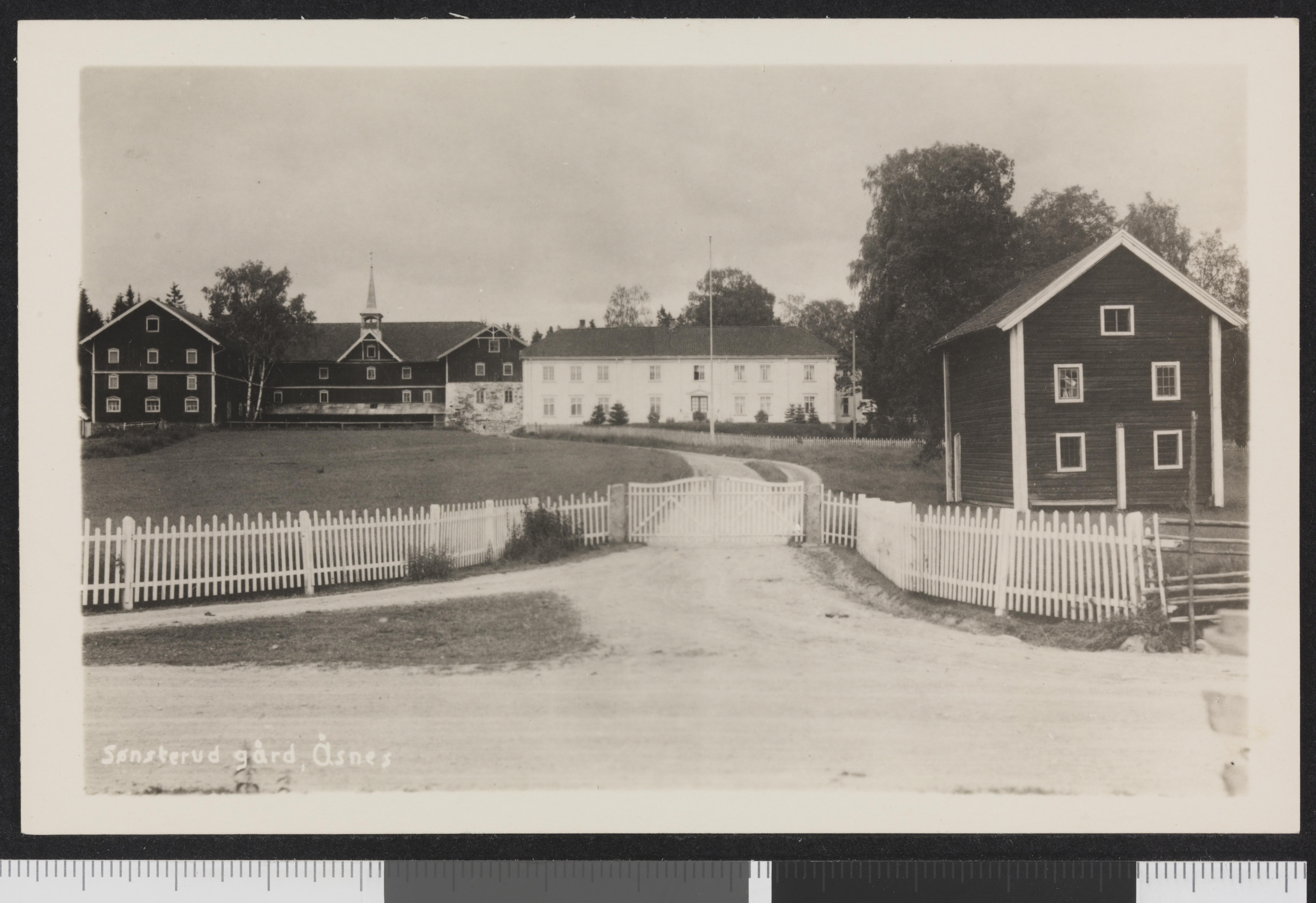
