= Hukusjøen =

Lake in Innlandet, Norway

- Interactive map of the lake
- Location: Åsnes and Grue, Innlandet
- Coordinates: 60°29′37″N 11°56′45″E
- Primary inflows: Veståa river
- Primary outflows: Auståa river
- Basin countries: Norway
- Max. length: 5.3 kilometres (3.3 mi)
- Max. width: 1 kilometre (0.62 mi)
- Surface area: 2.77 km^{2} (1.07 sq mi)
- Shore length^{1}: 12.32 kilometres (7.66 mi)
- Surface elevation: 177 metres (581 ft)
- References: NVE
- ^{1} Shore length is not a well-defined measure.

Hukusjøen is a lake in Innlandet county, Norway. The 2.77-square-kilometre (1.07 sq mi) lake lies on the border of Grue Municipality and Åsnes Municipality. The lake is located about 5 kilometres (3.1 mi) to the southwest of the village of Hof, about 3 kilometres (1.9 mi) north of the village of Risberget, and about 12 kilometres (7.5 mi) northwest of the village of Kirkenær.

== See also ==
- List of lakes in Norway
