= Åsnes Church =

Church in Innlandet, Norway

- Åsnes kirke
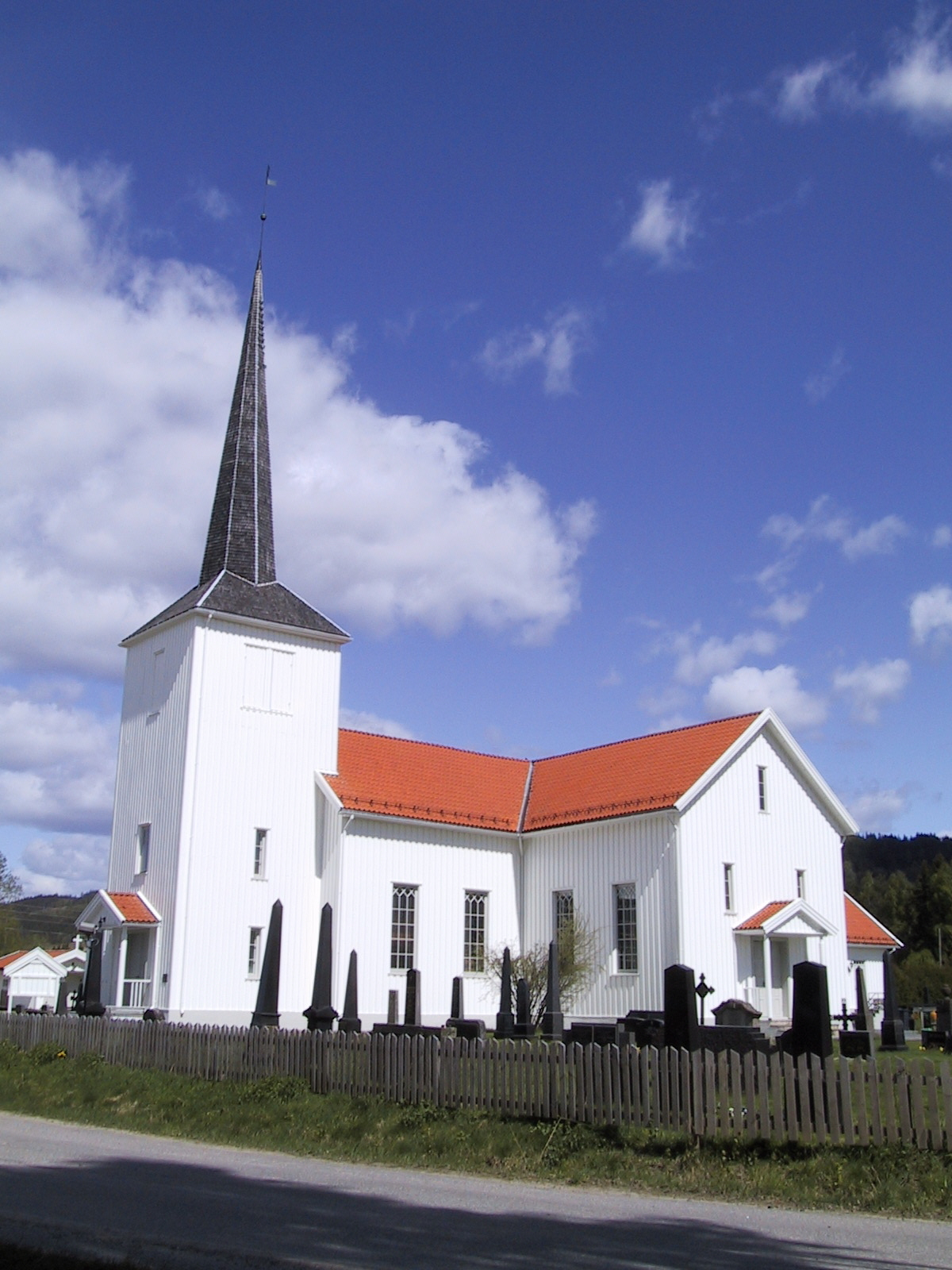
- View of the church
- Åsnes Church
- 60°36′36″N 11°58′35″E
- Location: Åsnes Municipality, Innlandet
- Country: Norway
- Denomination: Church of Norway
- Previous denomination: Catholic Church
- Churchmanship: Evangelical Lutheran

History
- Status: Parish church
- Founded: c. 1300
- Consecrated: 1744

Architecture
- Functional status: Active
- Architectural type: Cruciform
- Completed: 1744 (282 years ago)

Specifications
- Capacity: 400
- Materials: Wood

Administration
- Diocese: Hamar bispedømme
- Deanery: Solør, Vinger og Odal prosti
- Parish: Åsnes
- Norwegian Cultural Heritage Site
- Type: Church
- Status: Automatically protected
- ID: 85999

Åsnes Church (Norwegian: Åsnes kirke) is a parish church of the Church of Norway in Åsnes Municipality in Innlandet county, Norway. It is located in the village of Flisa. It is the church for the Åsnes parish which is part of the Solør, Vinger og Odal prosti (deanery) in the Diocese of Hamar. The white, wooden church was built in a cruciform design in 1744 using plans drawn up by an unknown architect. The church seats about 400 people.

== History ==
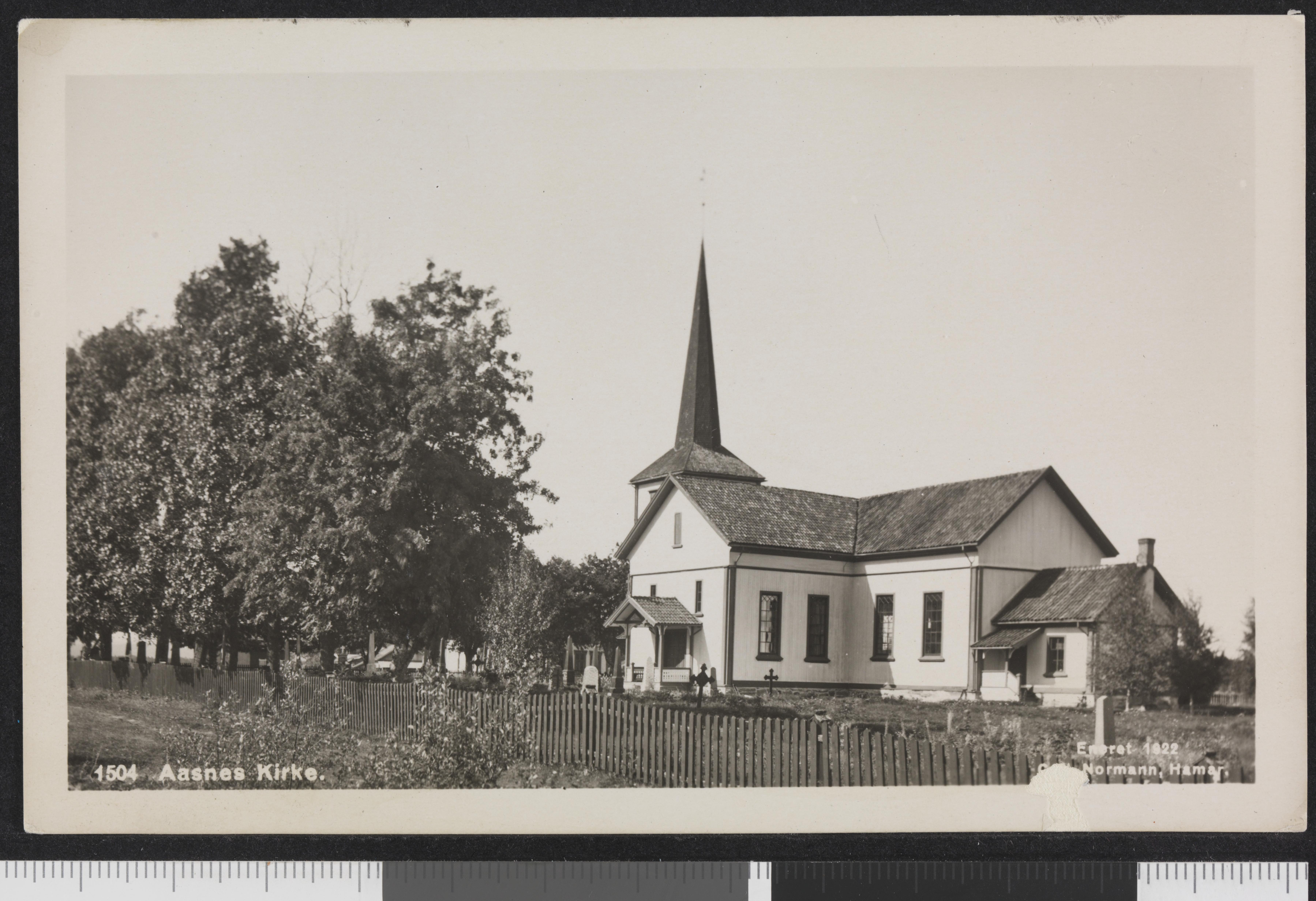
View of the church

The earliest existing historical records of the church date back to the year 1394, but the church was not new that year. The first church in Åsnes was a wooden stave church that was built around the year 1300. This church was located at Åsnes, about 2.5 kilometres (1.6 mi) south of the present church site (on the opposite side of river Glomma). The church was torn down around the 1520s or 1530s and replaced with a new church on the opposite side of the river, near the present site of the church. This new church was built at Telle, about 500 metres (1,600 ft) south of the present church site. This building was a wooden long church with a small tower on the roof. In 1686, the church was described as rather fragile and in need of repair. In 1702–1704, the church was renovated and expanded by adding two transepts to give the church a cruciform floor plan. It also got a new sacristy and new interior furnishings. Not too long afterwards, in 1720, the church was described as too small and dilapidated. By 1739, the parish decided to tear down the building and to replace it.

A new church was built at the present church site from 1744-1747.It was a wooden cruciform building that seated about 600 people (later renovations have lowered this number to about 400). The new building was consecrated in 1744, but the building itself was completely finished and ready to use until 1747. The church was refurbished and restored in 1854. In 1876, the church was significantly renovated based on plans by Jacob Wilhelm Nordan and the work was led by Günther Schüssler. During this project, the roof was removed, the walls were increased about 1 metre (3 ft 3 in) in height, and a new roof was installed. The exterior siding was replaced, and the foundation wall was improved. The altarpiece was painted by artist Axel Ender in 1876 and is titled Jesus' Resurrection. During a renovation in 1936, the church was closed for several months and parishioners used the nearby Gjesåsen Church instead. New interior colors were added by the painter Domenico Erdmann in connection with this restoration. There was another major renovation and restoration in 1954–1955 led by Halvor Vreim. Towards the end of 2016, the church was closed due to the discovery harmful fungi growing in the building. Significant work was done to remedy the situation and improve the building while it was closed for three years. The church reopened on 22 December 2019.

== See also ==
- List of churches in Hamar
