= Åsnes Finnskog Church =

Church in Innlandet, Norway

- Åsnes Finnskog kirke
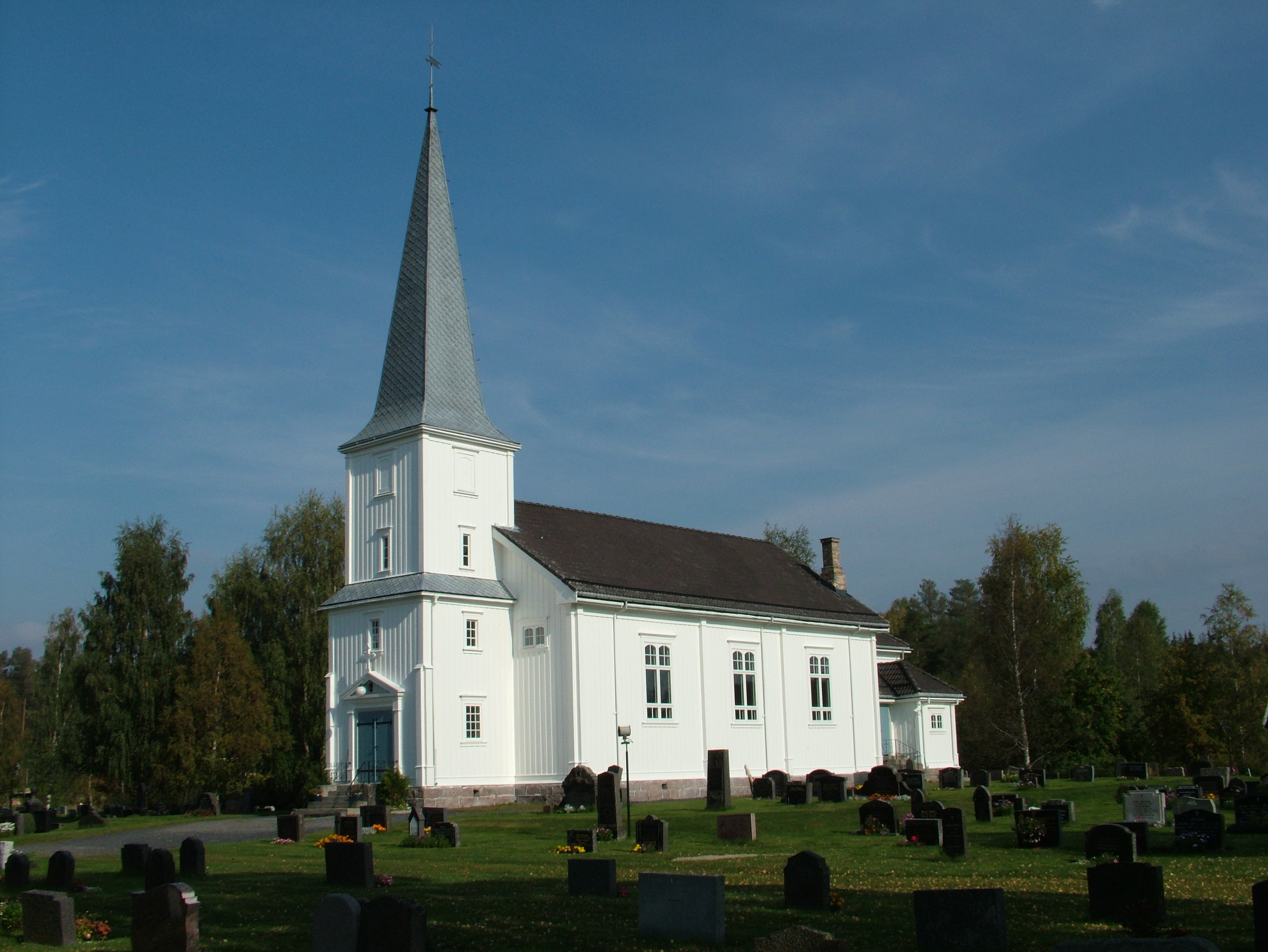
- View of the church
- Åsnes Finnskog Church
- 60°42′14″N 12°22′46″E
- Location: Åsnes Municipality, Innlandet
- Country: Norway
- Denomination: Church of Norway
- Churchmanship: Evangelical Lutheran

History
- Former name: Gretviken kirke
- Status: Parish church
- Founded: 1807
- Consecrated: 1861

Architecture
- Functional status: Active
- Architect: Jacob Wilhelm Nordan
- Architectural type: Long church
- Completed: 1861 (165 years ago)

Specifications
- Capacity: 250
- Materials: Wood

Administration
- Diocese: Hamar bispedømme
- Deanery: Solør, Vinger og Odal prosti
- Parish: Åsnes Finnskog
- Norwegian Cultural Heritage Site
- Type: Church
- Status: Not protected
- ID: 86000

Åsnes Finnskog Church (Norwegian: Åsnes Finnskog kirke) is a parish church of the Church of Norway in Åsnes Municipality in Innlandet county, Norway. It is located in the village of Vermundsjøen in the Finnskogen area. It is the church for the Åsnes Finnskog parish which is part of the Solør, Vinger og Odal prosti (deanery) in the Diocese of Hamar. The white, wooden church was built in a long church design in 1861 using plans drawn up by the architect Jacob Wilhelm Nordan. The church seats about 250 people.

== History ==
Around the year 1807, a chapel house named Prekenstua was used for church activities in the Finnskogen area of Åsnes. This house stood at Vermundsberget, about 2 kilometres (1.2 mi) south of the present church site. This was a temporary solution, but it wasn't until the mid-1800s when the large Hof Church parish was divided into three parishes, and the new Åsnes Church parish included this area in the Finnskogen forest. A new church was built at Gretviken to replace the old chapel house in 1861. The new church was designed by Jacob Wilhelm Nordan and it seated about 150 people. The new building was consecrated in 1861 and it was named Gretviken Church (later it was renamed Åsnes Finnskog Church). In 1911–1912, the church was renovated and enlarged using plans by Martin O. Bråten. The nave was enlarged to seat about 250 people. The church was re-consecrated in November 1912.

== See also ==
- List of churches in Hamar
