= Kjellmyra =

Village in Åsnes Municipality, Norway

- Village
- Interactive map of Kjellmyra
- Location within Innlandet Location within Norway
- Coordinates: 60.64641°N 12.03867°E
- Country: Norway
- Region: Eastern Norway
- County: Innlandet
- District: Solør
- Municipality: Åsnes Municipality

Area
  - Total: 0.65 km^{2} (0.25 sq mi)
- Elevation: 192 m (630 ft)

Population (2024)
  - Total: 451
  - Density: 694/km^{2} (1,800/sq mi)
- Time zone: UTC+01:00 (CET)
  - Summer (DST): UTC+02:00 (CEST)
- Post Code: 2280 Gjesåsen

Kjellmyra is a village in Åsnes Municipality in Innlandet county, Norway. The village is located along the river Flisa, about 3.5 kilometres (2.2 mi) north of the village of Flisa, about 5 kilometres (3.1 mi) south of the village of Gjesåsen (and the lake Gjesåssjøen), and about 4 kilometres (2.5 mi) southwest of the village of Sønsterud.

The 0.65-square-kilometre (160-acre) village has a population (2024) of 451 and a population density of 694 inhabitants per square kilometre (1,800/sq mi).
