= Birger Lie =

Norwegian sport shooter (1891–1970)

Personal information
- Born: 20 October 1891 Åsnes, Norway
- Died: 22 September 1970 (aged 78) Åsnes, Norway

Sport
- Sport: Sports shooting

Birger Lie (20 October 1891 – 22 September 1970) was a Norwegian sport shooter. He was born in Åsnes, and his club was Aasnes Skytterlag. He competed in the military rifle (three positions) event at the 1912 Summer Olympics in Stockholm.
