= Sinnerud =

Village in Stange Municipality, Norway

Sinnerud Øvre Sinnerud
- Village
- Interactive map of Sinnerud
- Location within Innlandet Location within Norway
- Coordinates: 60.78089°N 11.14655°E
- Country: Norway
- Region: Eastern Norway
- County: Innlandet
- District: Hedmarken
- Municipality: Stange Municipality
- Elevation: 159 m (522 ft)
- Time zone: UTC+01:00 (CET)
  - Summer (DST): UTC+02:00 (CEST)
- Post Code: 2312 Ottestad

Sinnerud is a village in Stange Municipality in Innlandet county, Norway. The village is located along the south side of the river Svartelva, about 2 kilometres (1.2 mi) east of the village of Bekkelaget. The European route E6 highway runs along the west side of the village.

Sinnerud the is considered to be part of the urban area for the town of Hamar which stretches over the municipal border into Stange Municipality. The 0.29-square-kilometre (72-acre) village area of Sinnerud and the neighboring village of Sanderud have a combined population (2021) of 305 and a population density of 1,057 inhabitants per square kilometre (2,740/sq mi).
