= Ranheimsbygdi =

Settlement in Nord-Aurdal municipality

Ranheimsbygdi Ranheimsbygda
- Bygd (hamlet)
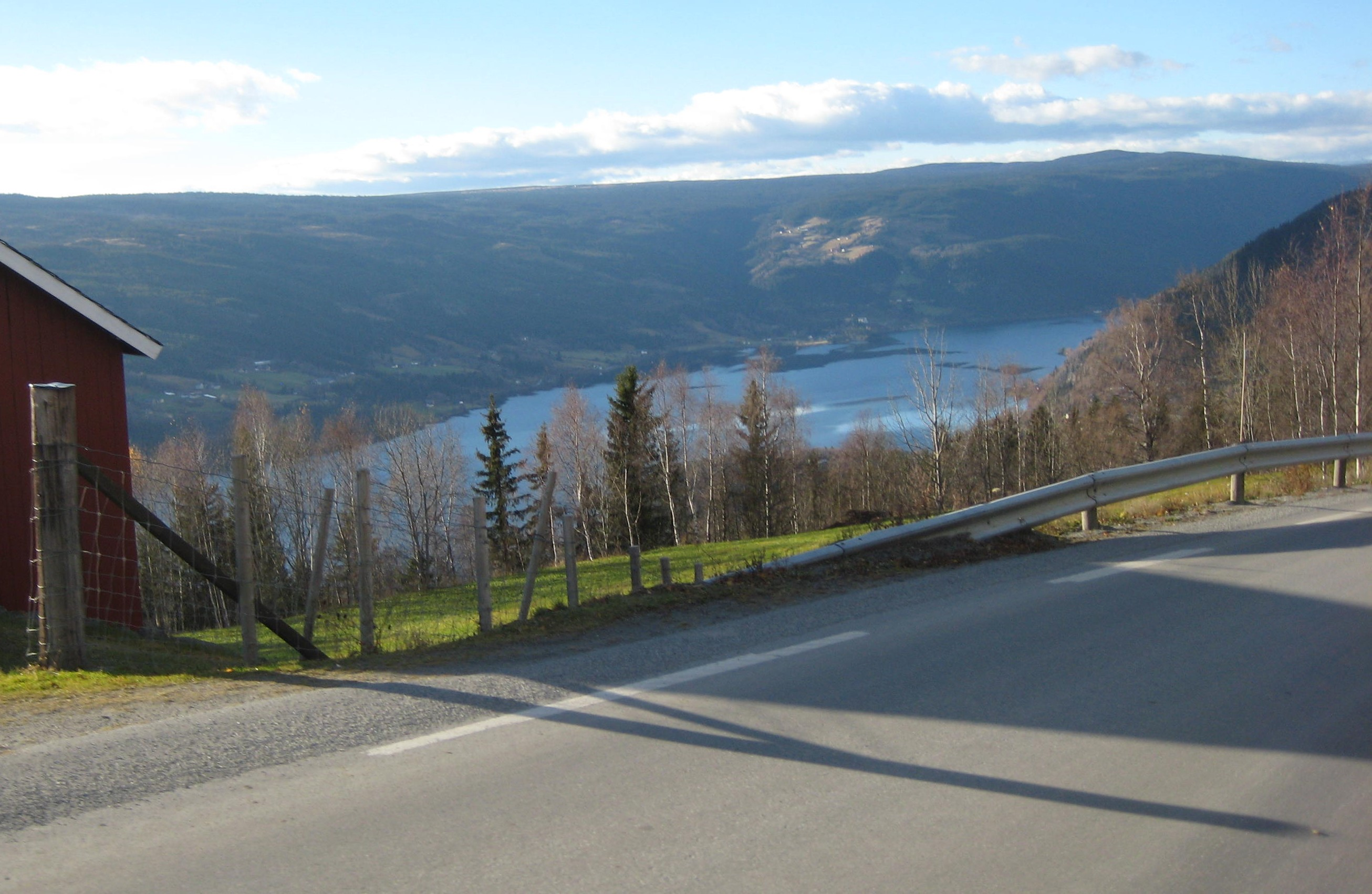
- View of the Strondafjorden from the village

- Seal
- Country: Norway
- Municipality: Nord-Aurdal
- Highest elevation: 698.7 m (2,292 ft)

Population
  - Total: ~95
- Precise population total is unknown
- Demonym: Ranheimsbygdbu

Ranheimsbygdi or Ranheimsbygda is a small hamlet in Norway situated at an estimated 1,400 metres east of Fagernes with a mean elevation of 608.1m (1995.1 ft) over sea level, the highest point being 698.7m (2292.6 ft) over sea level. Due to the restricted amount of official data about the hamlet, the exact population number is unknown, but it is realistically somewhere between 40 and 150 based on the number of houses and the average "persons per household" in the area (Nord-Aurdal).

== Etymology ==
The name "Ranheimsbygdi" comes from 3 nynorske words; "rane", "heim", and "bygd".

- Rane also written as Ran literally means "source" in Norwegian, most likely in reference to a lot of small streams running through the bygd from the Leirin lake to the Strondafjorden (Norwegian: Strandefjorden), where the Leirin is the primary source for the Strondafjorden.
- Heim is the nynorsk written form of the Norwegian word "Hjem", meaning home, often used when naming cities or settlements in Norway, e.g. Trondheim, Jessheim.
- Bygd is a Norwegian term rooting from the Old Norse word bygð, the most widely accepted translation being a Hamlet, often used to describe a small rural or isolated community, often in the context of farming communities.

== Transport ==
The hamlet is connected directly to the town of Fagernes via the county-road 2442 (Norwegian: Fylkesvei 2442) and Garlivegen with an 11-minutes drive from the hamlet, while also connected to the Fagernes-Leirin Airport via Steinsetbygdvegen with a 7-minutes drive from the hamlet. It is also connected with 2 bus stations in the hamlet, giving great opportunities for public transport to get to Fagernes.

Ranheimsbygdi (Innlandet)
Ranheimsbygdi (Norway)

List of bus stops in Ranheimsbygdi
Stop name	Postal code	Route(s)
Suskrysset	2900, Nord-Aurdal	309
Raneisbygde	2900, Nord-Aurdal	309
