= Risberget, Grue =

Village in Grue Municipality, Norway

Risberget
- Village
- Interactive map of Risberget
- Location within Innlandet Location within Norway
- Coordinates: 60.45554°N 11.97032°E
- Country: Norway
- Region: Eastern Norway
- County: Innlandet
- District: Solør
- Municipality: Grue Municipality
- Elevation: 175 m (574 ft)
- Time zone: UTC+01:00 (CET)
  - Summer (DST): UTC+02:00 (CEST)
- Post Code: 2260 Kirkenær

Risberget is a village in Grue Municipality in Innlandet county, Norway. The village is located west of Kirkenær, on the other side of the river Glomma. The lake Hukusjøen lies about 3.5 kilometres (2.2 mi) to the north of the village.
