= Bjølset =

Village in Elverum Municipality, Norway

- Village
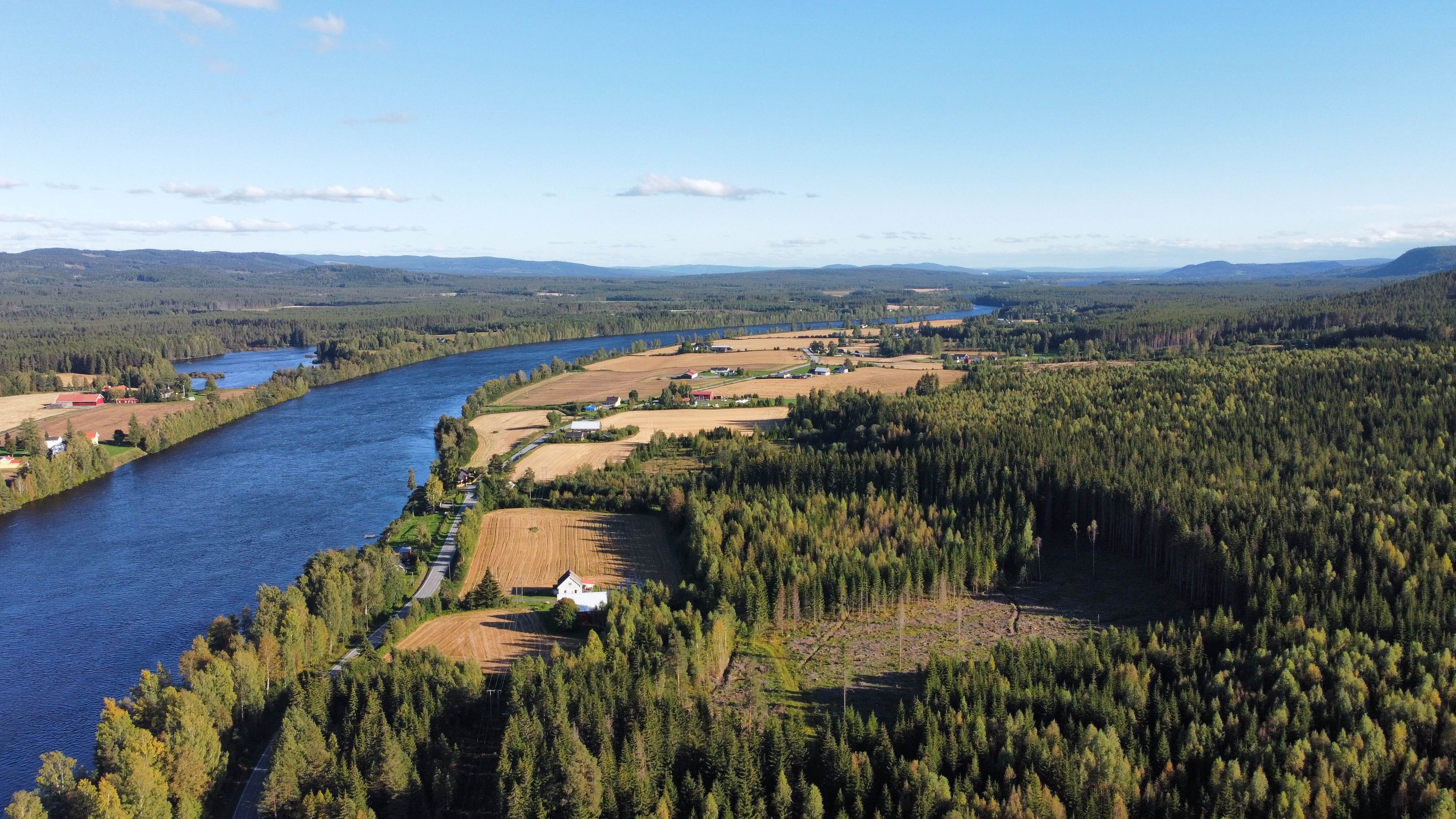
- View of the village in 2024, looking south
- Interactive map of Bjølset
- Location within Innlandet Location within Norway
- Coordinates: 60.78333°N 11.7°E
- Country: Norway
- Region: Eastern Norway
- County: Innlandet
- District: Østerdalen
- Municipality: Elverum Municipality
- Elevation: 181 m (594 ft)
- Time zone: UTC+01:00 (CET)
  - Summer (DST): UTC+02:00 (CEST)
- Post Code: 2406 Elverum

Bjølset is a village in Elverum Municipality in Innlandet county, Norway. The village is located along the river Glomma, about 12 kilometres (7.5 mi) south of the town of Elverum. In the southern part of the village, there is a nature reserve centered on a river canyon carved into Bronkeberget mountain.

Many burial mounds from the viking age have been found in the village.
