= Sandvika, Innlandet =

Village in Stange Municipality, Norway

Sandvika
- Village
- Interactive map of Sandvika
- Location within Innlandet Location within Norway
- Coordinates: 60°46′40″N 11°05′39″E
- Country: Norway
- Region: Eastern Norway
- County: Innlandet
- District: Hedmarken
- Municipality: Stange Municipality
- Elevation: 136 m (446 ft)
- Time zone: UTC+01:00 (CET)
  - Summer (DST): UTC+02:00 (CEST)
- Post Code: 2312 Ottestad

Sandvika is a village in Stange Municipality in Innlandet county, Norway. The village is located along the lake Mjøsa, just across a bay from the city of Hamar. Statistics Norway considers this to be part of the Bekkelaget urban area, so its statistics are not separately tracked.
