= Arne Løfsgaard =

Norwegian politician

Arne Lofsgaard

Personal details
- Born: Arne Adolf Lofsgaard; 21 November 1887; Åsnes, Innlandet, Norway
- Died: 26 February 1974 (aged 86–87)
- Political party: Centre Party

Arne Adolf Lofsgaard (21 October 1887 – 26 February 1974) was a Norwegian farmer and politician for the Agrarian Party.

He was born at Lofsgaard in Åsnes as a son of farmer and forest owner Gunnar Lofsgaard (1854–1923) and Anne Berger (1859–1948). After middle school he attended Jønsberg School of Agriculture from 1907 to 1908, and took over the family farm in 1911.

He was a member of Åsnes municipal council from 1916 to 1928, serving the last three years as mayor. He was elected to the Parliament of Norway in 1927 from the constituency Hedmark, and was re-elected in 1930. After ending his parliamentary term in 1933, he returned to Åsnes municipal council in the term 1934–1937.

He was also a commissioner for Akers Sparebank from 1926. He was a board member of Aasnes Privatbank, and when this bank became absorbed by Den norske Creditbank (DnC), he chaired the local branch of DnC. He also chaired the company Flisa Aktiemeieri, and was involved in Lutheran mission work. He was the father of university director Jostein Lofsgaard. He died in February 1974 and was buried in Åsnes.
