= Bekkelaget, Innlandet =

Village in Stange Municipality, Norway

Bekkelaget
- Village
- Interactive map of Bekkelaget
- Location within Innlandet Location within Norway
- Coordinates: 60.77382°N 11.11617°E
- Country: Norway
- Region: Eastern Norway
- County: Innlandet
- District: Hedmarken
- Municipality: Stange Municipality

Area
  - Total: 3.36 km^{2} (1.30 sq mi)
- Elevation: 175 m (574 ft)

Population (2024)
  - Total: 7,086
  - Density: 2,109/km^{2} (5,460/sq mi)
- Time zone: UTC+01:00 (CET)
  - Summer (DST): UTC+02:00 (CEST)
- Post Code: 2312 Ottestad

Bekkelaget is a village in Stange Municipality in Innlandet county, Norway. The village is located across the Åkersvika bay (part of the lake Mjøsa) from the town of Hamar. The European route E6 highway runs along the east side of Bekkelaget. The village of Ottestad lies about 2 kilometres (1.2 mi) to the south, the village of Sinnerud lies about 2 kilometres (1.2 mi) to the east, and the village of Sandvika lies about 1 kilometre (0.62 mi) to the west of Bekkelaget.

The 3.36-square-kilometre (830-acre) village has a population (2024) of 7,086 and a population density of 2,109 inhabitants per square kilometre (5,460/sq mi).
