= Åsnes Municipality =

Municipality in Innlandet, Norway

Åsnes Municipality Åsnes kommune
- Municipality
- Aasnes herred (historic name)
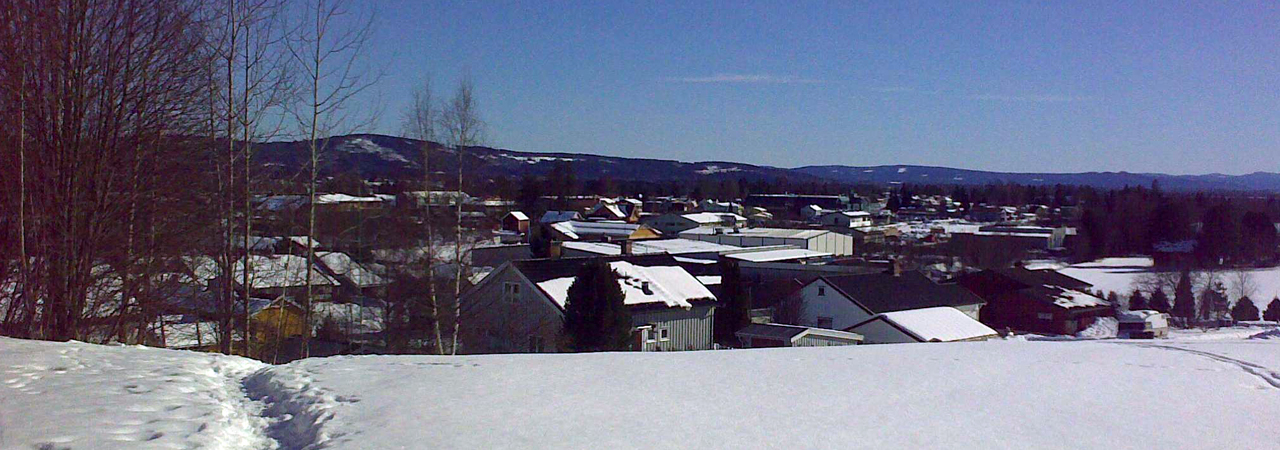
- View of the village of Flisa

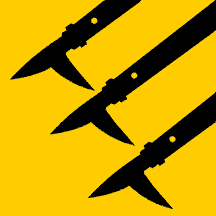
- Flag Coat of arms

- Innlandet within Norway

- Åsnes within Innlandet
- Coordinates: 60°39′13″N 12°9′11″E
- Country: Norway
- County: Innlandet
- District: Solør
- Established: 1854
  - Preceded by: Aasnes og Vaaler Municipality
- Administrative centre: Flisa

Government
  - Mayor (2023): Einar Toverud (Sp)

Area
  - Total: 1,040.93 km^{2} (401.91 sq mi)
  - Land: 1,004.09 km^{2} (387.68 sq mi)
  - Water: 36.84 km^{2} (14.22 sq mi) 3.5%
  - Rank: #108 in Norway
- Highest elevation: 634.6 m (2,082 ft)

Population (2025)
  - Total: 7,247
  - Rank: #141 in Norway
  - Density: 7/km^{2} (18/sq mi)
  - Change (10 years): ▼ −2.7%
- Demonym: Åsnessokning

Official language
  - Norwegian form: Bokmål
- Time zone: UTC+01:00 (CET)
  - Summer (DST): UTC+02:00 (CEST)
- ISO 3166 code: NO-3418
- Website: Official website

Åsnes is a municipality in Innlandet county, Norway. It is located in the traditional district of Solør. The administrative centre of the municipality is the village of Flisa, which is also the largest village in the municipality with nearly 1,800 people. Other villages in the municipality include Gjesåsen, Hof, Sønsterud, and Kjellmyra.

The 1,041-square-kilometre (402 sq mi) municipality is the 108th largest by area out of the 357 municipalities in Norway. Åsnes Municipality is the 141st most populous municipality in Norway with a population of 7,247. The municipality's population density is 7 inhabitants per square kilometre (18/sq mi) and its population has decreased by 2.7% over the previous 10-year period.

== General information ==
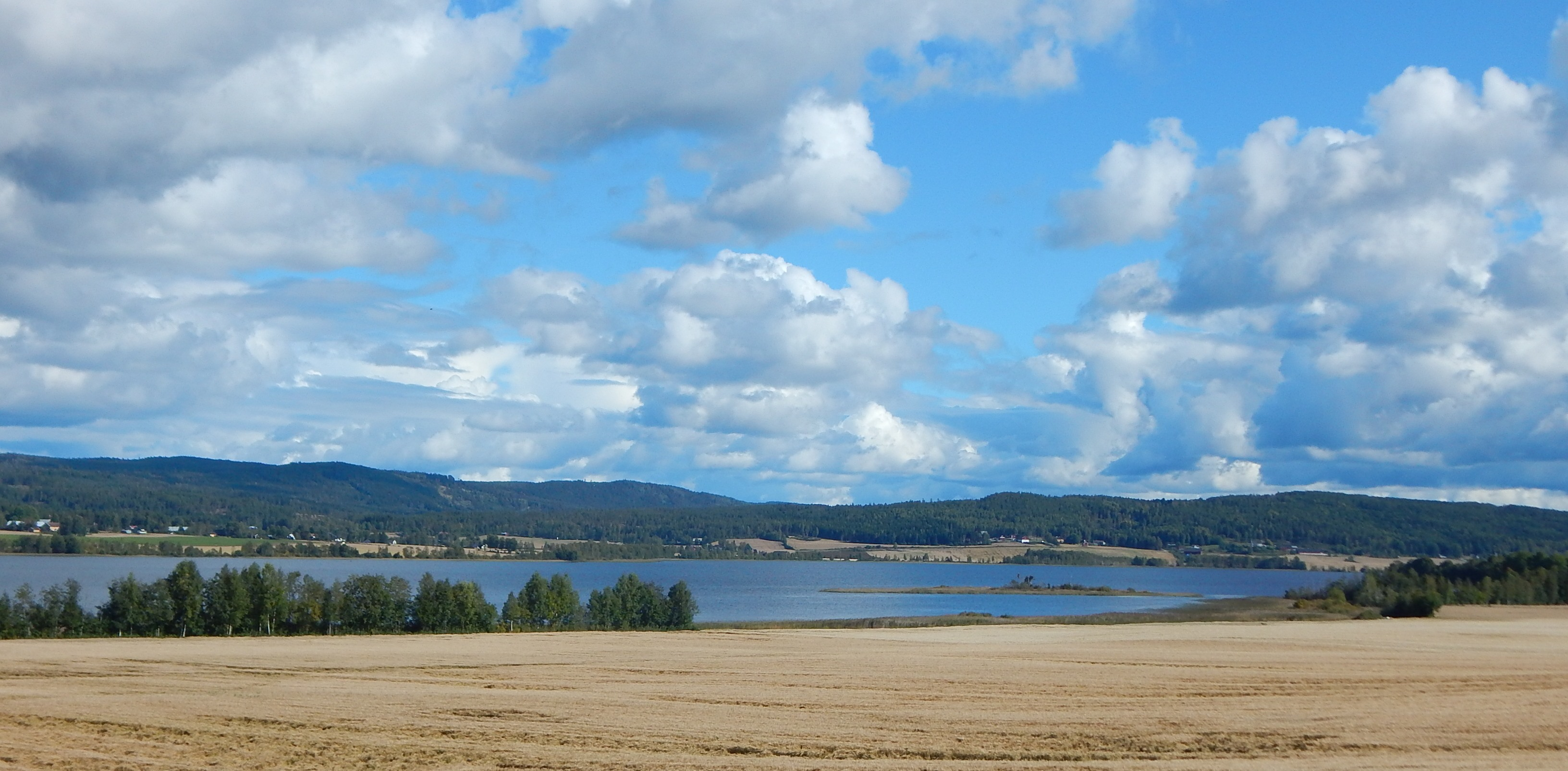
View of Gjesåssjøen lake

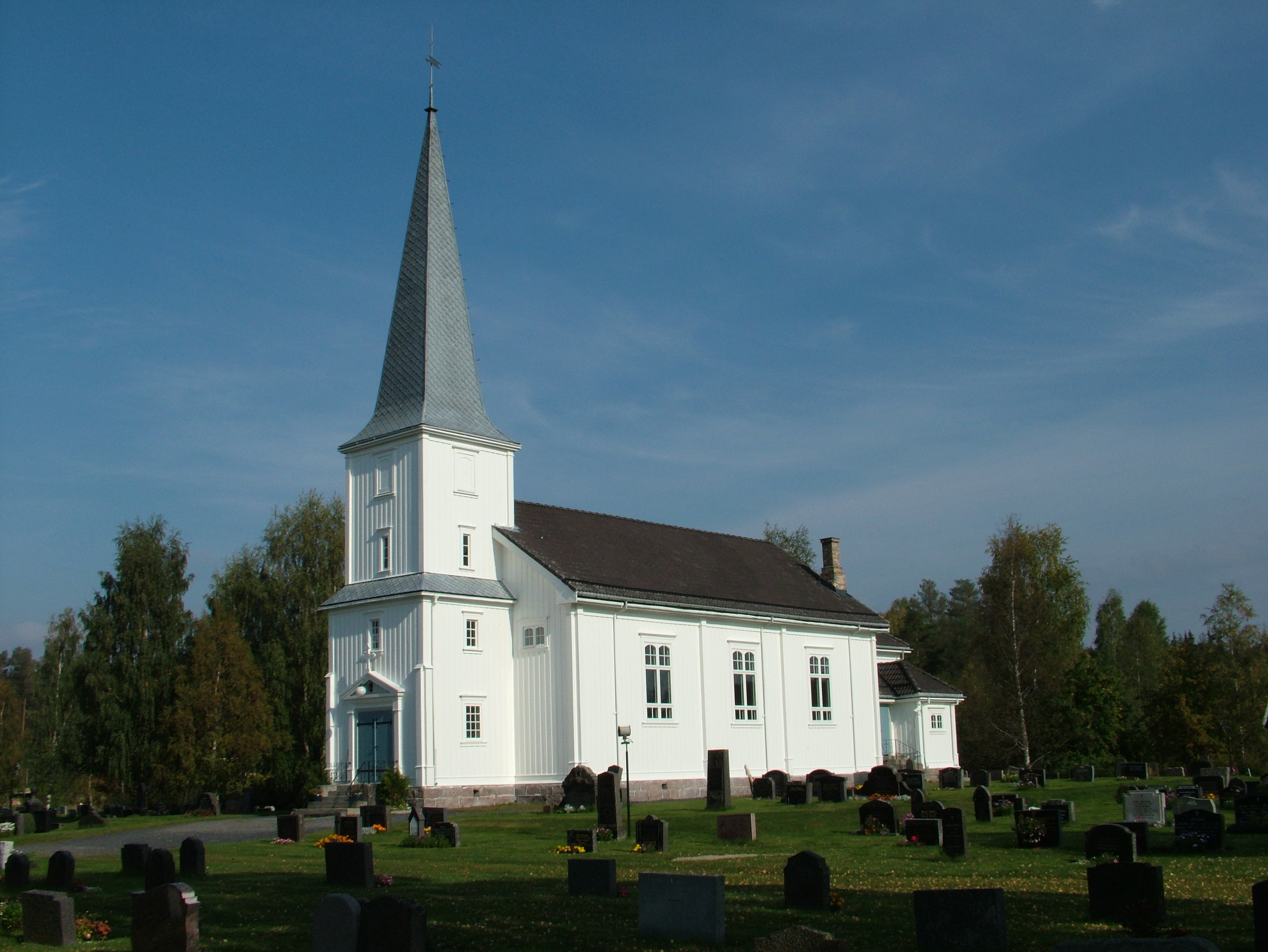
Åsnes Finnskog Church

When municipal government was established in Norway on 1 January 1838, the Åsnes area was part of Hof Municipality. In 1849, Hof Municipality was divided into two: Hof Municipality (population: 2,913) in the south and Aasnes og Vaaler Municipality (population: 7,087) in the north. A short time later, in 1854, Aasnes og Vaaler Municipality was divided into two: Våler Municipality (population: 3,410) in the north and Åsnes Municipality (population: 3,677) in the south.

During the 1960s, there were many municipal mergers across Norway due to the work of the Schei Committee. On 1 January 1963, Hof Municipality (population: 3,222) was merged into Åsnes Municipality (population: 6,750). On 1 January 1969, the Rotberget farm area (population: 23) in the Finnskogen part of the municipality was transferred to the neighboring Grue Municipality.

In the 2010s, there were discussions of further municipal mergers but the neighboring municipalities of Grue and Våler both rejected merging with Åsnes Municipality.

Historically, the municipality was part of Hedmark county. On 1 January 2020, the municipality became a part of the newly-formed Innlandet county (after Hedmark and Oppland counties were merged).

=== Name ===
The municipality (originally the parish) is named after the old Åsnes farm (Old Norse: Ásnes) since the first Åsnes Church was built there. The first element is áss which means "mountain ridge". The last element is nes which means "headland". The headland that it is referring to is made by the river Glomma near the Åsnes farm which is located beneath a hill. On 21 December 1917, a royal resolution enacted the 1917 Norwegian language reforms. Prior to this change, the name was spelled Aasnes with the digraph "Aa", and after this reform, the name was spelled Åsnes, using the letter Å instead.

=== Coat of arms ===
The coat of arms was granted on 9 December 2001. The official blazon is "Or, three pike hooks sable in bend sinister points in base dexter" (Norwegian: I gult tre skrått nedvoksende svarte fløterhaker). This means the arms have a field (background) has a tincture of Or which means it is commonly colored yellow, but if it is made out of metal, then gold is used. The charge is three hooks for log driving that are pointing downwards diagonally. This was chosen to represent the importance of logging and forestry to the municipality throughout history. There are three poles to symbolize the three important rivers of the municipality: Glomma, Flisa, and Kynna. The arms were designed by Arvid Steen. The municipal flag has the same design as the coat of arms.

=== Churches ===
The Church of Norway has six parishes (sokn) within Åsnes Municipality. It is part of the Solør, Vinger og Odal prosti (deanery) in the Diocese of Hamar.

Churches in Åsnes Municipality
Parish (sokn)	Church name	Location of the church	Year built
Arneberg	Arneberg Church	Jammerdalen	1878
Gjesåsen	Gjesåsen Church	Gjesåsen	1863
Hof	Hof Church	Hof	1861
Hof Finnskog	Hof Finnskog Church	Dulpetorpet	1953
Åsnes	Åsnes Church	Flisa	1744
Åsnes Finnskog	Åsnes Finnskog Church	Vermundsjøen	1861

== Geography ==
Number of minorities (1st and 2nd generation) in Åsnes by country of origin in 2017
Ancestry	Number
Poland	59
Lithuania	58
Sweden	55
Eritrea	32
Thailand	29
Syria	25
Bosnia-Herzegovina	23
Denmark	22

The municipality is located in the southern part of Innlandet county in the traditional region of Solør. Åsnes Municipality is bordered to the north by Våler Municipality, to the south by Grue Municipality, to the west by Nord-Odal Municipality and Stange Municipality, and to the east it borders Torsby Municipality in Värmland County, Sweden.

Finnskogen or the forest of the Finns is a belt about 32 kilometres (20 mi) wide which runs continuously northwards along the border between Norway and Sweden through six Norwegian municipalities, including Åsnes.

Åsnes has several lakes and rivers throughout the forested municipality which sits in the southern Glåmdal valley. It includes the lakes Gjesåssjøen, Hukusjøen, and Vermunden. The rivers Flisa, Rotna, and Glomma all flow through the municipality. The highest point in the municipality is the 634.6-metre (2,082 ft) tall mountain Elgklintsrøysa, located on the border with Sweden.

== Government ==
Åsnes Municipality is responsible for primary education (through 10th grade), outpatient health services, senior citizen services, welfare and other social services, zoning, economic development, and municipal roads and utilities. The municipality is governed by a municipal council of directly elected representatives. The mayor is indirectly elected by a vote of the municipal council. The municipality is under the jurisdiction of the Hedmarken og Østerdal District Court and the Eidsivating Court of Appeal.

=== Municipal council ===
The municipal council (Kommunestyre) of Åsnes Municipality is made up of 23 representatives that are elected to four year terms. The tables below show the current and historical composition of the council by political party.

Åsnes kommunestyre 2023–2027
Party name (in Norwegian)	Number of representatives
Labour Party (Arbeiderpartiet)	6
Progress Party (Fremskrittspartiet)	5
Conservative Party (Høyre)	2
Red Party (Rødt)	1
Centre Party (Senterpartiet)	4
Common list (Samlingslista)	3
Åsnes local list (Åsnes Bygdeliste)	2
Total number of members:	23

Åsnes kommunestyre 2019–2023
Party name (in Norwegian)	Number of representatives
Labour Party (Arbeiderpartiet)	8
Progress Party (Fremskrittspartiet)	2
Conservative Party (Høyre)	1
Pensioners' Party (Pensjonistpartiet)	1
Centre Party (Senterpartiet)	9
Liberal Party (Venstre)	2
Total number of members:	23

Åsnes kommunestyre 2015–2019
Party name (in Norwegian)	Number of representatives
Labour Party (Arbeiderpartiet)	9
Progress Party (Fremskrittspartiet)	2
Conservative Party (Høyre)	2
Pensioners' Party (Pensjonistpartiet)	1
Centre Party (Senterpartiet)	4
Socialist Left Party (Sosialistisk Venstreparti)	1
Liberal Party (Venstre)	3
Radical Socialists (Radikale Sosialister)	1
Total number of members:	23

Åsnes kommunestyre 2011–2015
Party name (in Norwegian)	Number of representatives
Labour Party (Arbeiderpartiet)	9
Progress Party (Fremskrittspartiet)	3
Conservative Party (Høyre)	3
Pensioners' Party (Pensjonistpartiet)	1
Centre Party (Senterpartiet)	3
Liberal Party (Venstre)	3
Radical Socialists (Radikale Sosialister)	1
Total number of members:	23

Åsnes kommunestyre 2007–2011
Party name (in Norwegian)	Number of representatives
Labour Party (Arbeiderpartiet)	7
Progress Party (Fremskrittspartiet)	3
Conservative Party (Høyre)	2
Pensioners' Party (Pensjonistpartiet)	3
Centre Party (Senterpartiet)	2
Socialist Left Party (Sosialistisk Venstreparti)	1
Liberal Party (Venstre)	3
Radical Socialists (Radikale Sosialister)	2
Total number of members:	23

Åsnes kommunestyre 2003–2007
Party name (in Norwegian)	Number of representatives
Labour Party (Arbeiderpartiet)	10
Progress Party (Fremskrittspartiet)	3
Communist Party (Kommunistiske Parti)	2
Centre Party (Senterpartiet)	2
Socialist Left Party (Sosialistisk Venstreparti)	3
Joint list of the Conservative Party (Høyre), Christian Democratic Party (Kristelig Folkeparti), and Liberal Party (Venstre)	3
Total number of members:	23

Åsnes kommunestyre 1999–2003
Party name (in Norwegian)	Number of representatives
Labour Party (Arbeiderpartiet)	13
Progress Party (Fremskrittspartiet)	4
Conservative Party (Høyre)	2
Communist Party (Kommunistiske Parti)	1
Christian Democratic Party (Kristelig Folkeparti)	3
Centre Party (Senterpartiet)	5
Socialist Left Party (Sosialistisk Venstreparti)	3
Total number of members:	23

Åsnes kommunestyre 1995–1999
Party name (in Norwegian)	Number of representatives
Labour Party (Arbeiderpartiet)	13
Progress Party (Fremskrittspartiet)	4
Conservative Party (Høyre)	1
Christian Democratic Party (Kristelig Folkeparti)	1
Centre Party (Senterpartiet)	8
Socialist Left Party (Sosialistisk Venstreparti)	4
Total number of members:	31

Åsnes kommunestyre 1991–1995
Party name (in Norwegian)	Number of representatives
Labour Party (Arbeiderpartiet)	12
Progress Party (Fremskrittspartiet)	1
Conservative Party (Høyre)	2
Communist Party (Kommunistiske Parti)	1
Christian Democratic Party (Kristelig Folkeparti)	1
Centre Party (Senterpartiet)	6
Socialist Left Party (Sosialistisk Venstreparti)	8
Total number of members:	31

Åsnes kommunestyre 1987–1991
Party name (in Norwegian)	Number of representatives
Labour Party (Arbeiderpartiet)	20
Conservative Party (Høyre)	3
Communist Party (Kommunistiske Parti)	1
Christian Democratic Party (Kristelig Folkeparti)	2
Centre Party (Senterpartiet)	3
Socialist Left Party (Sosialistisk Venstreparti)	6
Cross-party local list (Tverrpolitisk bygdeliste)	6
Total number of members:	41

Åsnes kommunestyre 1983–1987
Party name (in Norwegian)	Number of representatives
Labour Party (Arbeiderpartiet)	19
Conservative Party (Høyre)	3
Communist Party (Kommunistiske Parti)	1
Christian Democratic Party (Kristelig Folkeparti)	2
Centre Party (Senterpartiet)	3
Socialist Left Party (Sosialistisk Venstreparti)	8
Cross-party local list (Tverrpolitisk bygdeliste)	5
Total number of members:	41

Åsnes kommunestyre 1979–1983
Party name (in Norwegian)	Number of representatives
Labour Party (Arbeiderpartiet)	20
Conservative Party (Høyre)	3
Communist Party (Kommunistiske Parti)	1
Christian Democratic Party (Kristelig Folkeparti)	2
Centre Party (Senterpartiet)	4
Socialist Left Party (Sosialistisk Venstreparti)	8
Local people's free list (Bygdefolkets Frie Liste)	3
Total number of members:	41

Åsnes kommunestyre 1975–1979
Party name (in Norwegian)	Number of representatives
Labour Party (Arbeiderpartiet)	19
Conservative Party (Høyre)	2
Christian Democratic Party (Kristelig Folkeparti)	2
Centre Party (Senterpartiet)	5
Socialist Left Party (Sosialistisk Venstreparti)	9
Local people's free list (Bygdefolkets Frie list)	4
Total number of members:	41

Åsnes kommunestyre 1971–1975
Party name (in Norwegian)	Number of representatives
Labour Party (Arbeiderpartiet)	21
Conservative Party (Høyre)	2
Communist Party (Kommunistiske Parti)	3
Christian Democratic Party (Kristelig Folkeparti)	2
Centre Party (Senterpartiet)	6
Socialist People's Party (Sosialistisk Folkeparti)	7
Total number of members:	41

Åsnes kommunestyre 1967–1971
Party name (in Norwegian)	Number of representatives
Labour Party (Arbeiderpartiet)	20
Conservative Party (Høyre)	2
Communist Party (Kommunistiske Parti)	3
Christian Democratic Party (Kristelig Folkeparti)	2
Centre Party (Senterpartiet)	7
Socialist People's Party (Sosialistisk Folkeparti)	7
Total number of members:	41

Åsnes kommunestyre 1963–1967
Party name (in Norwegian)	Number of representatives
Labour Party (Arbeiderpartiet)	24
Conservative Party (Høyre)	2
Communist Party (Kommunistiske Parti)	5
Christian Democratic Party (Kristelig Folkeparti)	2
Centre Party (Senterpartiet)	6
Socialist People's Party (Sosialistisk Folkeparti)	2
Total number of members:	41

Åsnes herredsstyre 1959–1963
Party name (in Norwegian)	Number of representatives
Labour Party (Arbeiderpartiet)	15
Conservative Party (Høyre)	1
Communist Party (Kommunistiske Parti)	7
Christian Democratic Party (Kristelig Folkeparti)	2
Centre Party (Senterpartiet)	4
Total number of members:	29
Note: On 1 January 1963, Hof Municipality became part of Åsnes Municipality.

Åsnes herredsstyre 1955–1959
Party name (in Norwegian)	Number of representatives
Labour Party (Arbeiderpartiet)	14
Conservative Party (Høyre)	2
Communist Party (Kommunistiske Parti)	9
Farmers' Party (Bondepartiet)	4
Total number of members:	29

Åsnes herredsstyre 1951–1955
Party name (in Norwegian)	Number of representatives
Labour Party (Arbeiderpartiet)	14
Conservative Party (Høyre)	2
Communist Party (Kommunistiske Parti)	9
Farmers' Party (Bondepartiet)	3
Total number of members:	28

Åsnes herredsstyre 1947–1951
Party name (in Norwegian)	Number of representatives
Labour Party (Arbeiderpartiet)	12
Communist Party (Kommunistiske Parti)	11
Joint List(s) of Non-Socialist Parties (Borgerlige Felleslister)	5
Total number of members:	28

Åsnes herredsstyre 1945–1947
Party name (in Norwegian)	Number of representatives
Labour Party (Arbeiderpartiet)	13
Communist Party (Kommunistiske Parti)	13
Joint List(s) of Non-Socialist Parties (Borgerlige Felleslister)	2
Total number of members:	28

Åsnes herredsstyre 1937–1941*
Party name (in Norwegian)	Number of representatives
Labour Party (Arbeiderpartiet)	20
Conservative Party (Høyre)	1
Communist Party (Kommunistiske Parti)	2
Farmers' Party (Bondepartiet)	3
Joint List(s) of Non-Socialist Parties (Borgerlige Felleslister)	2
Total number of members:	28
Note: Due to the German occupation of Norway during World War II, no elections were held for new municipal councils until after the war ended in 1945.

=== Mayors ===
The mayor (Norwegian: ordfører) of Åsnes Municipality is the political leader of the municipality and the chairperson of the municipal council. Here is a list of people who have held this position:

- 1854–1857: Rev. H.L. Bergh
- 1858–1859: Ole Bjørneby
- 1860–1863: Kjel Glorvigen
- 1864–1865: M. Gundersen
- 1866–1871: Hans Henrik Schultze
- 1872–1874: M. Gundersen
- 1875–1881: M. Lie
- 1882–1883: J.B. Krohg
- 1884–1893: Ole Bjørneby
- 1893–1902: Adolf Bjørneby
- 1903–1904: Gunnar Lofsgaard
- 1905–1910: Arne Sparby
- 1910–1914: August Embretsen (Ap)
- 1915–1919: Syver Hauge (Ap)
- 1919–1922: Per Aasness
- 1922–1925: Botolf Haug (NKP)
- 1925–1928: Arne Adolf Løfsgaard (Bp)
- 1929–1931: Botolf Haug (NKP)
- 1931–1932: Syver Hauge (Ap)
- 1940–1941: Kr. Arneberg
- 1941–1945: Gudbjørn Fleischer (NS)
- 1945–1963: Jon Gudbjørn Dybendal (Ap)
- 1963–1975: Torstein Haugen (Ap)
- 1975–1979: Torbjørn Konttorp (SV)
- 1979–1981: Johan Dybendal (Ap)
- 1982–1983: Torbjørn Konttorp (SV)
- 1983–1991: Hans-Didrik Bakke (Ap)
- 1991–1999: Knut Guttorm Rustad (Sp)
- 1999–2003: Hans-Didrik Bakke (Ap)
- 2003–2007: Frank Willy Bjørneseth (Ap)
- 2007–2011: Lars Petter Heggelund (V)
- 2011–2019: Ørjan Bue (Sp)
- 2019–2023: Kari Heggelund (Sp)
- 2023–present: Einar Toverud (Sp)

== Notable people ==
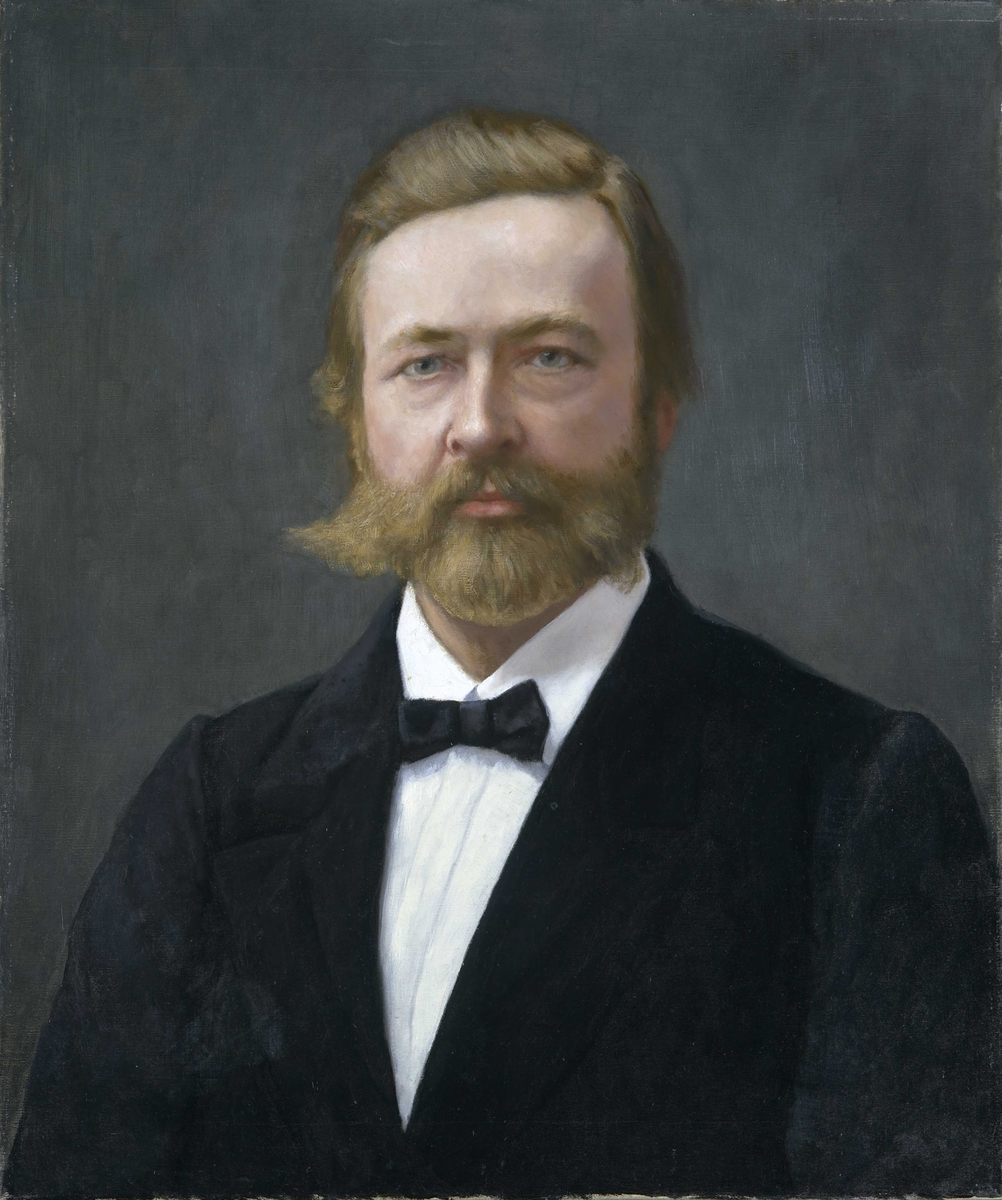
Johannes Bergh, 1890

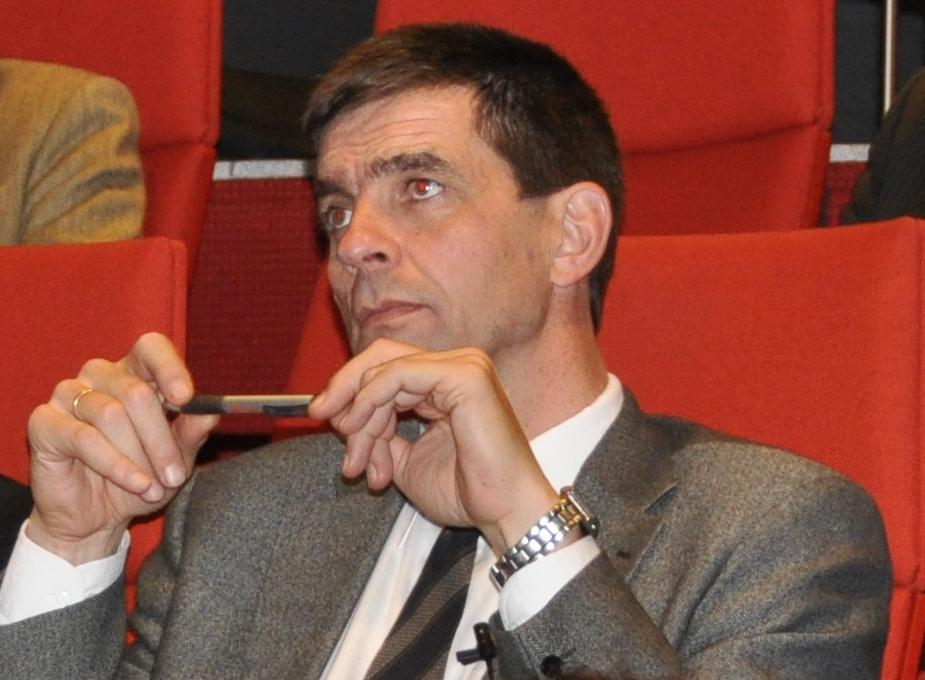
Gunnar Gundersen, 2008

- Hans Jacob Grøgaard (1764 in Åsnes – 1836), a parish priest, writer, and representative at the Norwegian Constituent Assembly
- Johannes Bergh (1837 in Åsnes – 1906), a barrister and the Attorney General of Norway from 1893 to 1904
- Jacob Sparre Schneider (1853 in Åsnes – 1918), a zoologist and entomologist
- Adolf Gundersen (1865 in Åsnes – 1938), an American physician who founded Gundersen Health System in La Crosse, Wisconsin
- Per Aasness (1875 at Flaen – 1959), a military officer, politician, and Mayor of Asnes from 1919 to 1922
- Ole Bjerke (1881 in Åsnes – 1959), a sport shooter who competed at the 1912 Summer Olympics
- Arne Løfsgaard (1887 at Løfsgaard – 1974), a farmer, politician, and Mayor of Åsnes from 1925 to 1928
- Birger Lie (1891 in Åsnes – 1970), a sport shooter who competed at the 1912 Summer Olympics
- Jon Gudbjørn Dybendal (1904 in Åsnes – 1985), a politician and Mayor of Åsnes from 1945 to 1963
- Rolf Jacobsen (1907–1994), an author and modernist writer who twice lived in Åsnes
- Kai Grjotheim (1919 in Åsnes – 2003), a chemist and academic who solved problems within thermodynamics of salt smelters
- Gunnar Gundersen (born 1956 in Åsnes), a politician who also competed in the swimming at the 1976 Summer Olympics
- Tom Stræte Lagergren (born 1991 in Åsnes), a DJ and record producer who goes by the stage name Matoma
- Emilie Enger Mehl (born 1993 in Lørenskog), a politician for the Centre Party who served as minister of justice since 2021 and Member of parliament since 2017.

== Sister cities ==
Åsnes has sister city agreements with the following places:

- Ballerup, Region Hovedstaden, Denmark
- Fagersta, Västmanland County, Sweden
- Jämsä, Länsi-Suomi, Finland
- Myjava, Trenčín Region, Slovakia
- Vasanello, Viterbo, Italy

== Gallery ==
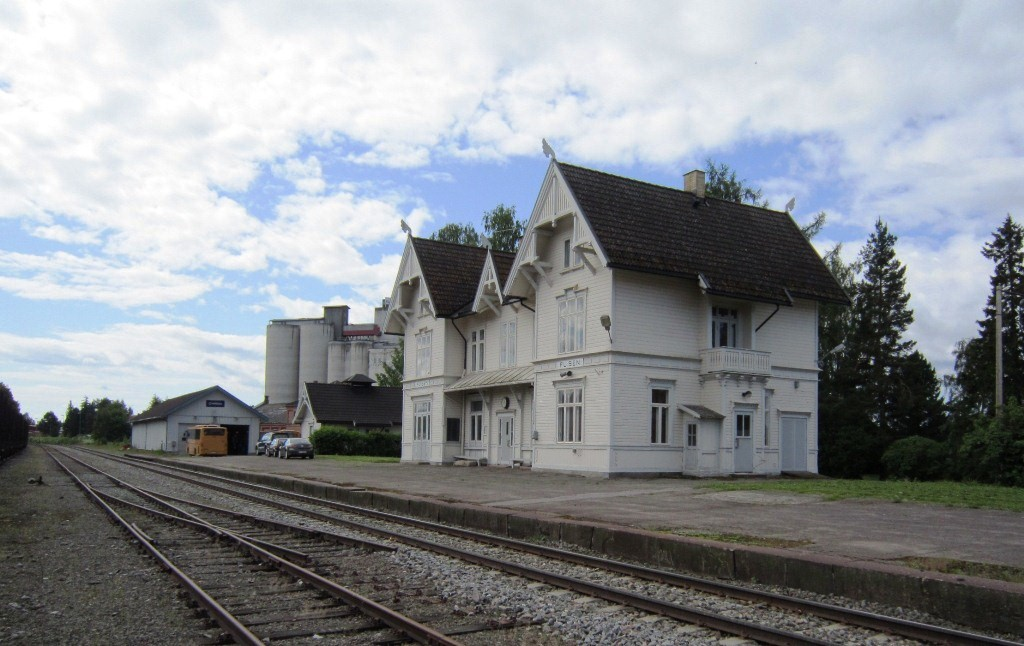
Flisa station on the Solørbanen railway

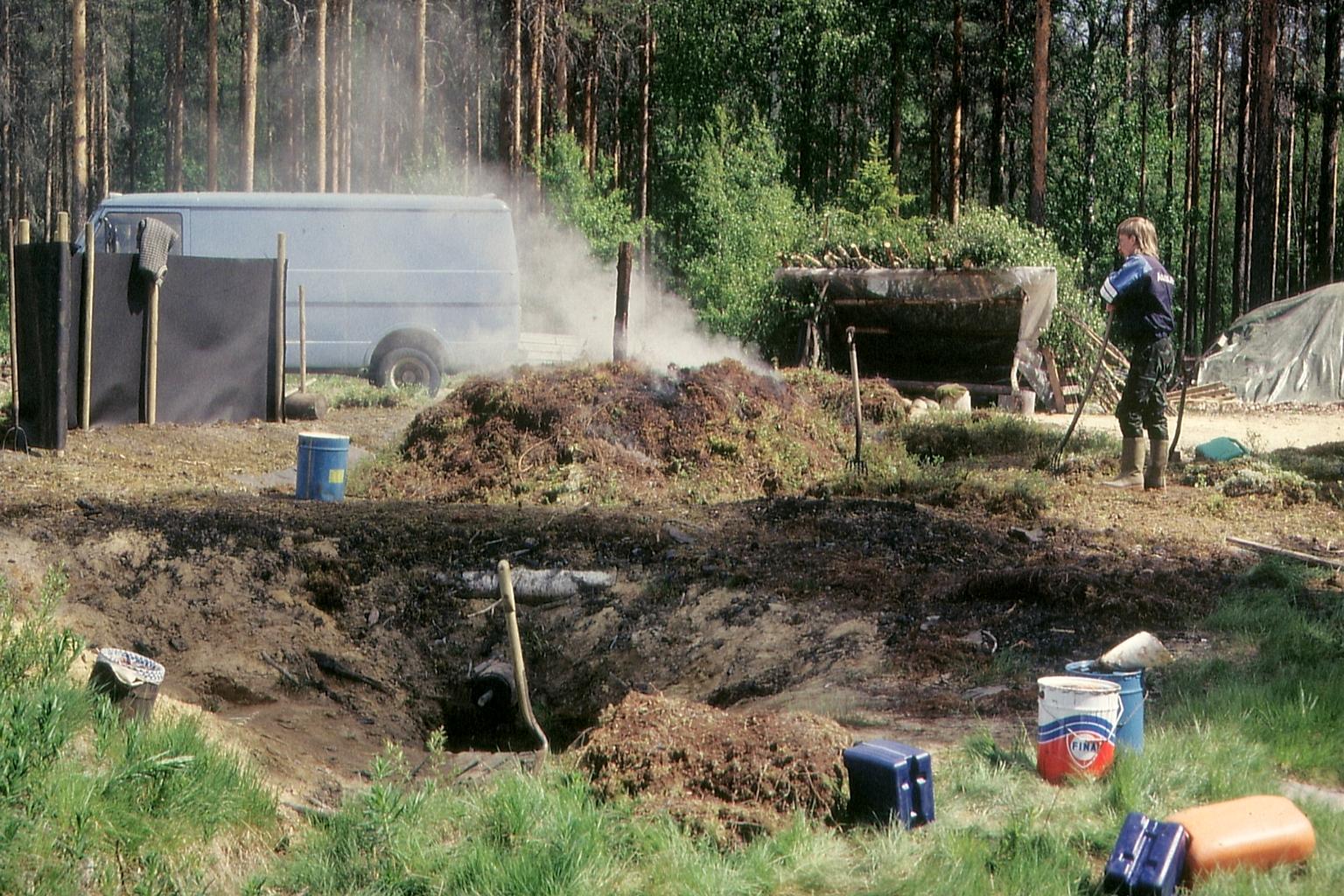

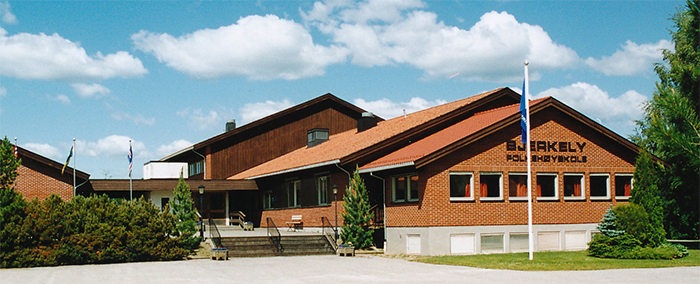
Bjerkely Folkehøyskole (school)
