= Gjesåsen =

Village in Åsnes Municipality, Norway

- Village
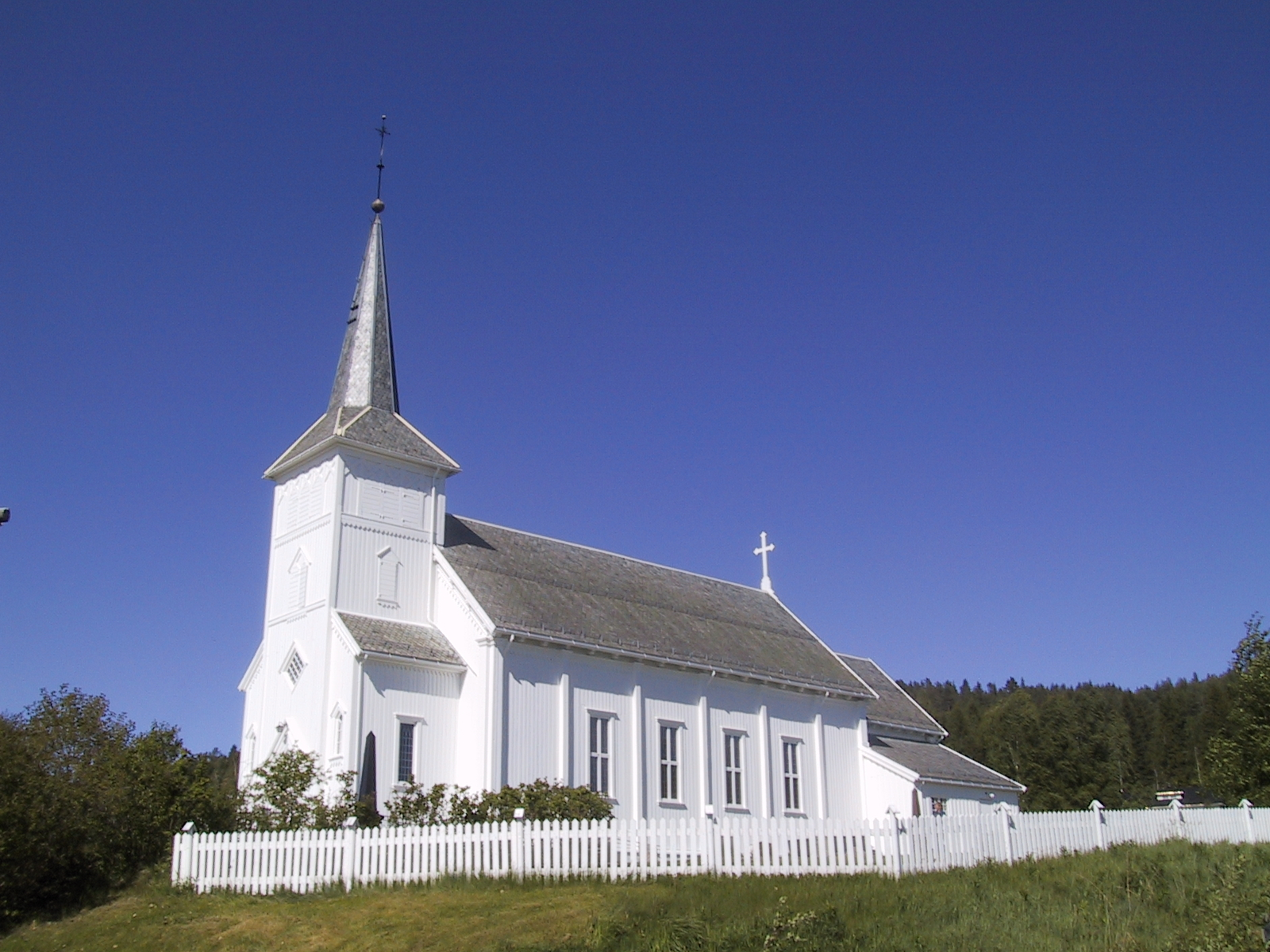
- View of the local Gjesåsen Church
- Interactive map of Gjesåsen
- Location within Innlandet Location within Norway
- Coordinates: 60.6795°N 12.02638°E
- Country: Norway
- Region: Eastern Norway
- County: Innlandet
- District: Solør
- Municipality: Åsnes Municipality
- Elevation: 270 m (890 ft)
- Time zone: UTC+01:00 (CET)
  - Summer (DST): UTC+02:00 (CEST)
- Post Code: 2280 Gjesåsen

Gjesåsen is a largely agricultural village area located in Åsnes Municipality in Innlandet county, Norway. The village area lies at the east end of the lake Gjesåssjøen. Gjesåsen Church is located here. The village of Kjellmyra lies about 5 kilometres (3.1 mi) south of Gjesåsen and the village of Sønsterud lies about 3 kilometres (1.9 mi) to the southeast of Gjesåsen.
