= Gjesåsen Church =

Church in Innlandet, Norway

- Gjesåsen kirke
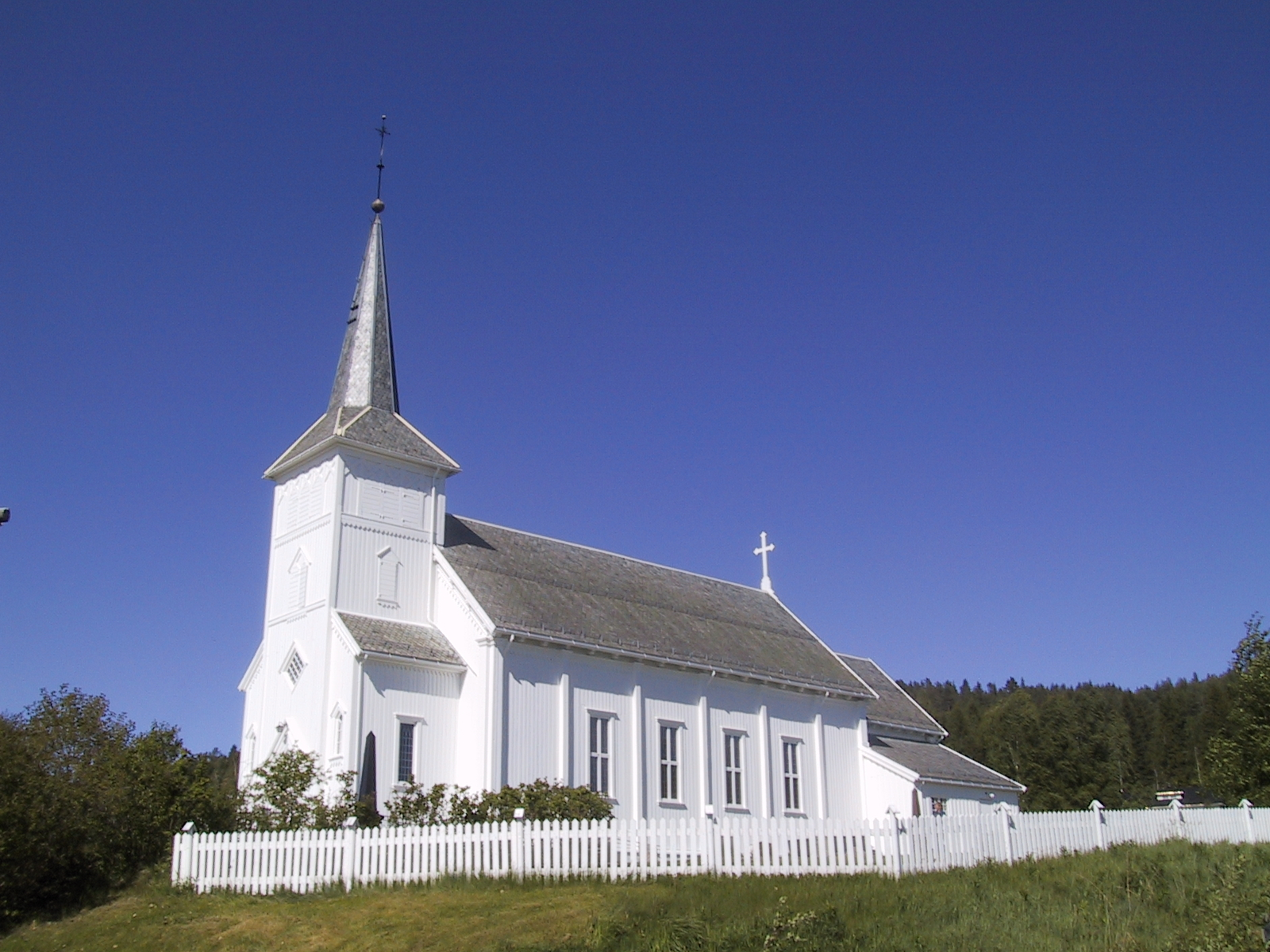
- View of the church
- Gjesåsen Church
- 60°40′42″N 12°01′29″E
- Location: Åsnes Municipality, Innlandet
- Country: Norway
- Denomination: Church of Norway
- Churchmanship: Evangelical Lutheran

History
- Status: Parish church
- Founded: 1863
- Consecrated: 16 December 1863

Architecture
- Functional status: Active
- Architect: Peter Høier Holtermann
- Architectural type: Long church
- Completed: 1863 (163 years ago)

Specifications
- Capacity: 300
- Materials: Wood

Administration
- Diocese: Hamar bispedømme
- Deanery: Solør, Vinger og Odal prosti
- Parish: Gjesåsen
- Norwegian Cultural Heritage Site
- Type: Church
- Status: Not protected
- ID: 84261

Gjesåsen Church (Norwegian: Gjesåsen kirke) is a parish church of the Church of Norway in Åsnes Municipality in Innlandet county, Norway. It is located in the village of Gjesåsen. It is the church for the Gjesåsen parish which is part of the Solør, Vinger og Odal prosti (deanery) in the Diocese of Hamar. The white, wooden church was built in a long church design in 1863 using plans drawn up by the architect Peter Høier Holtermann. The church seats about 300 people.

== History ==
In the 1860s, planning began for a new church in Gjesåsen. The church was designed by Peter Høier Holtermann. It is a wooden long church with a rectangular nave, a narrower chancel on the east end with a lower roof line, and a tower with a church porch at the foot of the tower on the west end of the nave. The new building was consecrated on 16 December 1863. In 1945, the choir was rebuilt. In 1954, a sacristy was built on the south side of the choir.

== See also ==
- List of churches in Hamar
