= Flisa =

Village in Åsnes Municipality, Norway

- Village
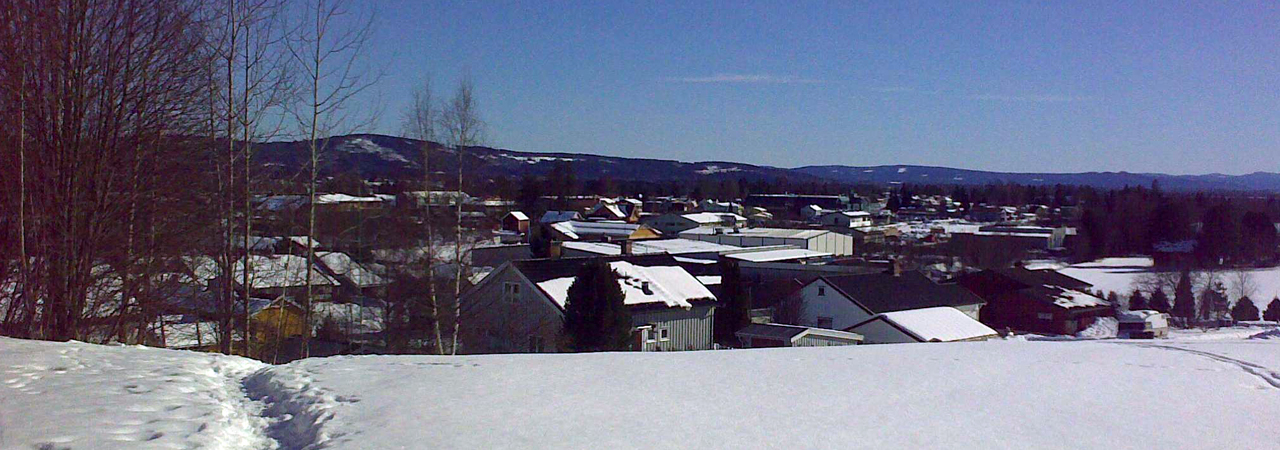
- View of the village
- Interactive map of Flisa
- Location within Innlandet Location within Norway
- Coordinates: 60.61318°N 12.01062°E
- Country: Norway
- Region: Eastern Norway
- County: Innlandet
- District: Solør
- Municipality: Åsnes Municipality

Area
  - Total: 1.88 km^{2} (0.73 sq mi)
- Elevation: 185 m (607 ft)

Population (2024)
  - Total: 1,771
  - Density: 942/km^{2} (2,440/sq mi)
- Time zone: UTC+01:00 (CET)
  - Summer (DST): UTC+02:00 (CEST)
- Post Code: 2270 Flisa

Flisa is the administrative centre of Åsnes Municipality in Innlandet county, Norway. The village lies at the confluence of the rivers Flisa and Glomma. The Norwegian National Road 2 and the Solørbanen railway line both pass through the village. The village of Kjellmyra is located about 3 kilometres (1.9 mi) to the south, the village of Sønsterud is about 6 kilometres (3.7 mi) to the northeast, and the village of Gjesåsen is about 6 kilometres (3.7 mi) to the north. Åsnes Church is located on the west side of the village of Flisa.

The 1.88-square-kilometre (460-acre) village has a population (2024) of 1,771 and a population density of 942 inhabitants per square kilometre (2,440/sq mi). Despite its low population, Flisa is a commercial centre and it has a variety of diverse shops that are located along the town's main street, Kaffegata (English: Coffee Street).

== Attractions ==
For some time the log driver statue was the town's only landmark. In recent years however, other attractions have opened such as the world's tallest toothpick since Norway's largest producer of toothpicks is located nearby. In 2003, the Flisa Bridge opened, crossing the Glomma just south of the village. It is the world's longest wooden bridge with a length of 197 metres (646 ft).

In the summer, Flisa is plagued with mosquitoes. They are quite famous throughout Åsnes Municipality and are usually referred to as Flisa Mygg which translates to "Flisa Mosquitoes".

== Notable people ==
- Matoma, a tropical house DJ and record producer

== Climate ==
Climate data for Flisa 1961-1990, extremes 1957-2015
Month	Jan	Feb	Mar	Apr	May	Jun	Jul	Aug	Sep	Oct	Nov	Dec	Year
Record high °C (°F)	11.0 (51.8)	11.0 (51.8)	16.4 (61.5)	24.9 (76.8)	27.5 (81.5)	32.9 (91.2)	30.8 (87.4)	31.6 (88.9)	26.3 (79.3)	18.5 (65.3)	11.9 (53.4)	11.4 (52.5)	32.9 (91.2)
Mean daily maximum °C (°F)	−5.2 (22.6)	−3.5 (25.7)	2.5 (36.5)	7.8 (46.0)	15.1 (59.2)	19.8 (67.6)	20.6 (69.1)	19.4 (66.9)	14.1 (57.4)	7.8 (46.0)	0.6 (33.1)	−3.7 (25.3)	7.9 (46.3)
Mean daily minimum °C (°F)	−12.5 (9.5)	−12.0 (10.4)	−7.1 (19.2)	−1.9 (28.6)	3.5 (38.3)	8.1 (46.6)	9.3 (48.7)	8.1 (46.6)	4.5 (40.1)	1.2 (34.2)	−5.3 (22.5)	−10.8 (12.6)	−1.2 (29.8)
Record low °C (°F)	−38.5 (−37.3)	−37.5 (−35.5)	−31.2 (−24.2)	−16.6 (2.1)	−5.6 (21.9)	−2.8 (27.0)	0.0 (32.0)	−1.6 (29.1)	−7.2 (19.0)	−17.0 (1.4)	−25.6 (−14.1)	−34.0 (−29.2)	−38.5 (−37.3)
Average precipitation mm (inches)	35 (1.4)	28 (1.1)	32 (1.3)	36 (1.4)	50 (2.0)	67 (2.6)	75 (3.0)	69 (2.7)	70 (2.8)	62 (2.4)	53 (2.1)	40 (1.6)	617 (24.4)
Average precipitation days	8.7	6.2	7.5	7.2	9.0	10.6	11.0	11.1	10.7	10.0	10.6	9.0	111.6
Source: Met Norway Eklima
