= Flisa (river) =

River in Innlandet, Norway

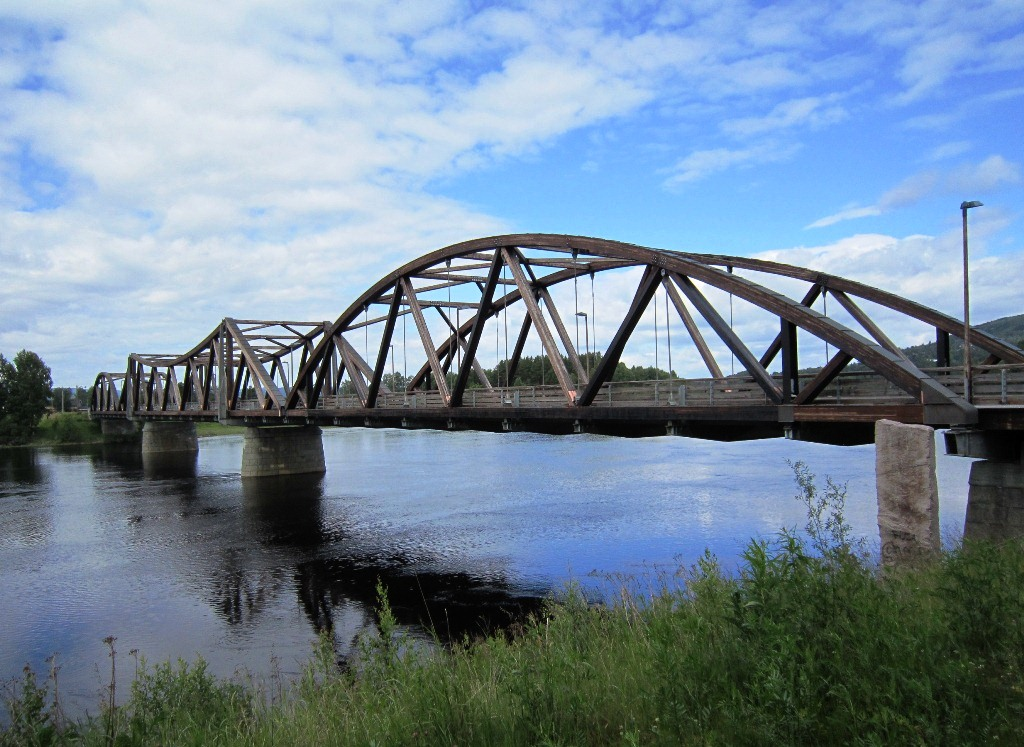
- Flisa Bridge

Location
- Country: Norway
- County: Innlandet
- Municipalities: Åsnes Municipality and Våler Municipality

Physical characteristics
- Source: Confluence of the rivers Ulvåa and Holåa
  - location: Våler and Åsnes, Norway
  - coordinates: 60.8423441°N 12.3208183°E
  - elevation: 275 metres (902 ft)
- Mouth: Glomma river
  - location: Flisa, Åsnes, Norway
  - coordinates: 60.58884303°N 12.0192790°E
  - elevation: 150 metres (490 ft)
- Length: 55 km (34 mi)
- Basin size: 1,649 km^{2} (637 sq mi)
- Discharge
  - average: 23 m^{3}/s (810 cu ft/s)

Flisa is a river in Innlandet county, Norway. The 55-kilometre (34 mi) long river is a tributary of the large river Glomma. The river mainly flows through Åsnes Municipality and a small portion of the river runs along the border of Åsnes Municipality and Våler Municipality. The river is formed by the confluence of the rivers Ulvåa and Holåa on the border of Våler and Åsnes (the sources of those two rivers are located in Elverum Municipality and Sweden). The river then flows to the south and west before joining the river Glomma just south of the village of Flisa. Some of the side rivers that join the Flisa are Vermundelv (from the lake Vermunden) and Kynna.

== See also ==
- List of rivers in Norway
