= Sculptures of Swedish rulers =

Sculptures of Swedish rulers have been created since the 17th century. Most of the Swedish royal sculptures are located in Stockholm. Many of these can be seen in the city center around Stockholm Palace, in Gamla stan, Riddarholmen, Kungsträdgården and Stadshusterassen. Uppsala and Rottneros Park have three sculptures each. Gothenburg, Karlskrona, Örebro and Halmstad have two sculptures each.

== List of sculptures ==
Ruler (incl. de facto rulers)	Year	Sculptor	City	Place	Notes	Coordinates
Birger Jarl	1854	Bengt Erland Fogelberg	Stockholm	Birger Jarls Torg, Riddarholmen		59°19′30.38″N 18°3′49.87″E
Magnus Ladulås	1984	Rune Karlzon	Jönköping	Skolgatan		
Torkel Knutsson	c. 1907	Ville Vallgren	Vyborg, Russia			60°42′33″N 28°44′39″E
Margaret	2006	Anne Marie Carl-Nielsen	Roskilde, Denmark	in front of ROV Center	equestrian statue	
Engelbrekt Engelbrektsson	1865	Carl Gustaf Qvarnström	Örebro	Stortorget		59°16′19.3″N 15°12′45″E
Engelbrekt Engelbrektsson	1916	Christian Eriksson	Stockholm; Sunne kommun	Kornhamnstorg in Gamla stan Rottneros Sculpture Park	See: sv:Bågspännaren	59°19′22″N 18°04′17″E 59°48′06.31″N 13°07′19.52″E
Engelbrekt Engelbrektsson	1932	Christian Eriksson	Stockholm; Sunne kommun	outside Stockholm City Hall; Rottneros Sculpture Park		
Engelbrekt Engelbrektsson	1919	Karl Hultström	Falun	Kristine kyrka		60°36′28″N 15°37′52″E
Engelbrekt Engelbrektsson	1935	Carl Eldh	Arboga	in front of Heliga Trefaldighetskyrka		
Engelbrekt Engelbrektsson	(1926)	Carl Milles	Sunne kommun	Rottneros Sculpture Park		59°48′06.31″N 13°07′19.52″E
Engelbrekt Engelbrektsson	1936	Stig Blomberg	Örebro	Armory in Örebro Castle		59°16′26″N 15°12′55″E
Karl Knutsson	1480s	unknown artist	Gripsholm Castle, Mariefred	National Portrait Gallery	wood carving	59°15′22″N 17°13′09″E
Sten Sture the Elder	1925	Carl Milles	Uppsala	Kronåsen	See sv:Sten Sturemonumentet equestrian statue	59°50′45.3″N 17°38′41.7″E
Sten Sture the Elder	1489	unknown artists	Stockholm	in Storkyrkan	wood carving See: sv:Sankt Göran och draken, Gamla stan	59°19′33″N 18°04′13″E
Sten Sture the Elder	1912	unknown artists	Stockholm	Köpmantorget, Österlånggatan	bronze replica	59°19′30.39″N 18°4′24.87″E
Gustav Vasa	1774	Pierre Hubert L'Archevêque	Stockholm	in front of House of Nobility	First full-body statue of a ruler in Sweden	59°19′32.59″N 18°3′57.76″E
Gustav Vasa	1864	Carl Gustaf Qvarnström	Västerås	Vasa Park	bust Västerås' first public sculpture	
Gustav Vasa	1827	Bengt Erland Fogelberg	Uppsala	Courtyard, Uppsala Castle	bust	59°51′12″N 17°38′09″E
Gustav Vasa	1903	Anders Zorn	Mora	Morastrand		
Gustav Vasa	1925	Carl Milles	Stockholm	inside Nordic Museum		59°19′44.8″N 18°5′37.2″E
Gustav Vasa	1924	Ida Matton	Gävle	Kvarnparken		
Gustav Vasa	1851	Johan Tobias Sergel	Kalmar	Stadsparken at Kalmar Castle	bust	56°39′37.5″N 16°21′29.9″E
Eric XIV						
Sigismund	1644	Clemente Molli	Warsaw	Castle Square		
Charles IX	1904	John Börjeson	Gothenburg	Kungsportsplatsen	See sv:Karl IX:s ryttarstaty i Göteborg equestrian statue	57°42′16.21″N 11°58′10.69″E
Charles IX	1926	Christian Eriksson	Karlstad			
Charles IX	1998	Anna Laaksonen	Nyköping	In front of Sörmland Museum	bust	
Gustavus Adolphus	1796	Pierre Hubert L'Archevêque	Stockholm	Gustav Adolfs torg		59°19′45.94″N 18°4′7.69″E
Gustavus Adolphus	end of 18th century	Johan Tobias Sergel	Svartsjö Palace, Färingsö	Slottsparken	marble	59°21′46″N 17°43′40″E
Gustavus Adolphus	1856	Bengt Erland Fogelberg	Bremen, Germany	outside Bremen Cathedral	first casting melted down c. 1942	53°04′31″N 8°48′32″E
Gustavus Adolphus	1854	Bengt Erland Fogelberg	Gothenburg	Gustav Adolfs torg	See sv:Gustav II Adolfs staty, Göteborg	57°42′25.56″N 11°58′0.57″E
Gustavus Adolphus	1992	Bengt Erland Fogelberg	Turku, Finland	in front of the Old Academy Building	only full-figure statue of a Swedish ruler in Finland	
Gustavus Adolphus	1992	Bengt Erland Fogelberg	Tartu, Estonia	In front of main building of University of Tartu		58°22′53.28″N 26°43′13.27″E
Gustavus Adolphus	1928	Otto Strandman	Tartu, Estonia	in front of main building of University of Tartu	replaced in 1992 by Fogelberg's statue	58°22′53.28″N 26°43′13.27″E
Gustavus Adolphus	1911	Harald Sörensen-Ringi	Sundsvall	Stora torget		
Gustavus Adolphus and Christian IV of Denmark	1952	Edvin Öhrström	Halmstad	in front of Stadshuset	Kungamötet (meeting of kings)	
Gustavus Adolphus	1952	Axel Wallenberg	Borås	Stora Torget	bust	
Gustavus Adolphus	1921	Gösta Almgren	Luleå	Stadsparken	bust	
Gustavus Adolphus	1924	Otto Strandman	Umeå	In front of Umeå rådhus	bust	
Gustavus Adolphus	1886	Ludwig Brunow	Lützen, Germany			
Gustavus Adolphus	1932		St. Peter, Minnesota, United States	Gustavus Adolphus College	bust	44.3235555°N 93.971738°W
Gustavus Adolphus and Axel Oxenstierna	1780s	unknown	Färingsö in Ekerö kommun	Park of Svartsjö Palace	Marble sculpture group, commissioned by Gustav III	59°21′43.08″N 17°43′40.88″E
Christina	1923	Aron Sandberg	Stockholm			
Christina	2000	Thomas Frisk	Halmstad	Drottning Kristina-passagen	bust	
Charles X Gustav	1896	John Börjeson	Malmö	Stortorget		55°36′22.08″N 13°0′0.88″E
Charles X Gustav	1915	Theodor Lundberg	Uddevalla	Kungstorget		
Charles X Gustav	1917	Gustaf Malmquist	Stockholm	in front of Nordic Museum		59°19′45″N 18°05′37″E
Charles XI	c. 1700	Bernard Foucquet	Stockholm	Courtyard of Stockholm Palace	unrealized project of Nicodemus Tessin the Younger	59°19′37″N 18°04′18″E
Charles XI	1897	John Börjeson	Karlskrona	Stortorget		56°9′38″N 15°35′9″E
Charles XI	19th century	John Börjeson	Stockholm	Courtyard of Stockholm Palace		59°19′37″N 18°04′18″E
Charles XII	1747, cast in 1749	Jacques-Philippe Bouchardon	Stockholm	Stockholms Palace	bust	59°19′37″N 18°04′18″E
Charles XII	1868	Johan Peter Molin	Stockholm	Kungsträdgården		59°19′48.08″N 18°4′19.93″E
Ulrika Eleonora						
Frederick I	1767	Jacques-Philippe Bouchardon (?)	Stockholm	Kungsträdgården, since removed	bust	
Adolf Frederick						
Gustav III	1808	Johan Tobias Sergel	Stockholm	Skeppsbron	modeled 1793, cast 1799	59°19′36.29″N 18°4′29.9″E
Gustav III	1923	Johan Tobias Sergel	Gothenburg; Hällefors	Näckrosdammen, Göteborg; Mästarnas Park	bust	57°41′42.31″N 11°58′58.7″E; 59°47′2.36″N 14°31′3.69″E
Gustav IV Adolf		Johan Tobias Sergel	Solna	Orangerimuseet	marble bust of Gustav IV Adolf as a child	
Charles XIII	1821	Erik Gustaf Göthe	Stockholm	Kungsträdgården		59°19′53″N 18°4′17″E
Charles XIII	1902	Johan Niklas Byström	Karlskrona	Hoglands park	marble	
Charles XIV John	1846	Ludwig Schwanthaler	Norrköping	Karl Johans park		58°35′40″N 16°11′4″E
Charles XIV John	1854	Bengt Erland Fogelberg	Stockholm	Slussplan		59°19′19.01″N 18°4′23.89″E
Charles XIV John	1875	Brynjulf Bergslien	Oslo	in front of Royal Palace	equestrian statue	59°55′01″N 10°43′39″E
Charles XIV John	1919	Alfred Ohlsson	Örebro	Storgatan		
Charles XIV John	1854	Bengt Erland Fogelberg	Uppsala	Engelska parken	bust	59°51′16″N 17°37′44″E
Oscar I						
Charles XV	1909	Charles Friberg	Stockholm	Lejonslätten, Djurgården		59°19′40″N 18°5′50″E
Oscar II	1897		Marstrand		bust	

== Photo gallery ==
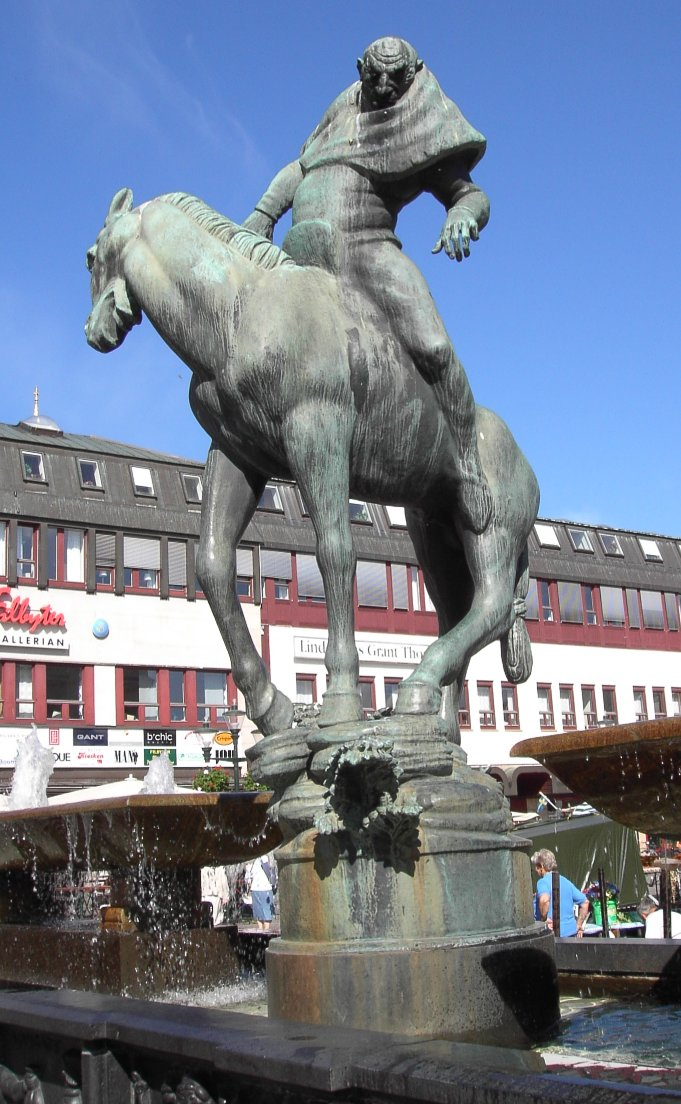
Folkungabrunnen in Linköping, by Carl Milles, 1927

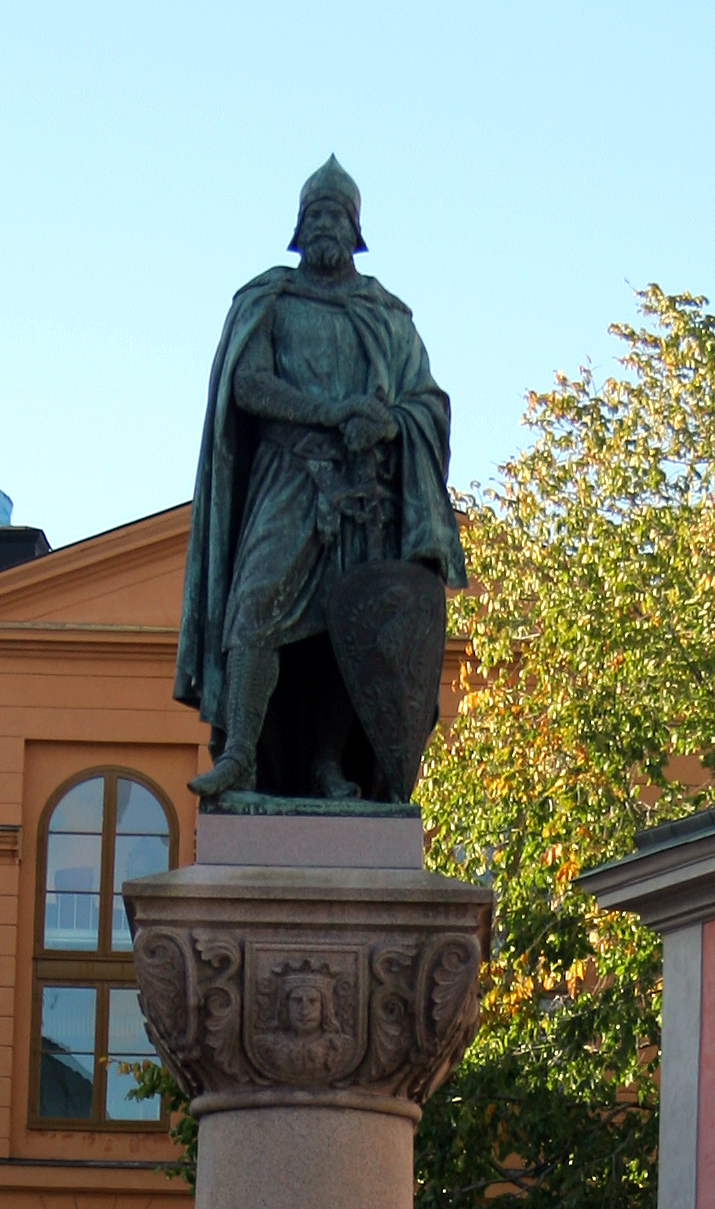
Birger Jarl in Stockholm, by Bengt Erland Fogelberg, 1854

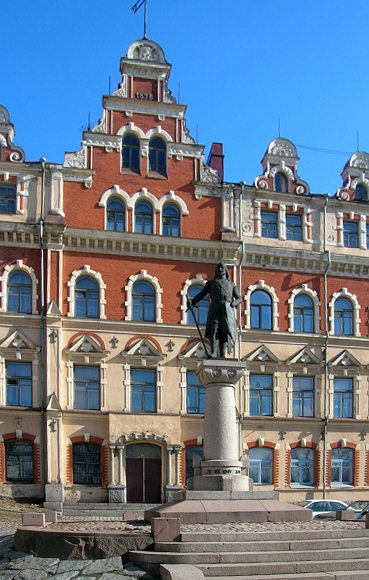
Torkel Knutsson in Vyborg, by Ville Vallgren, 1908

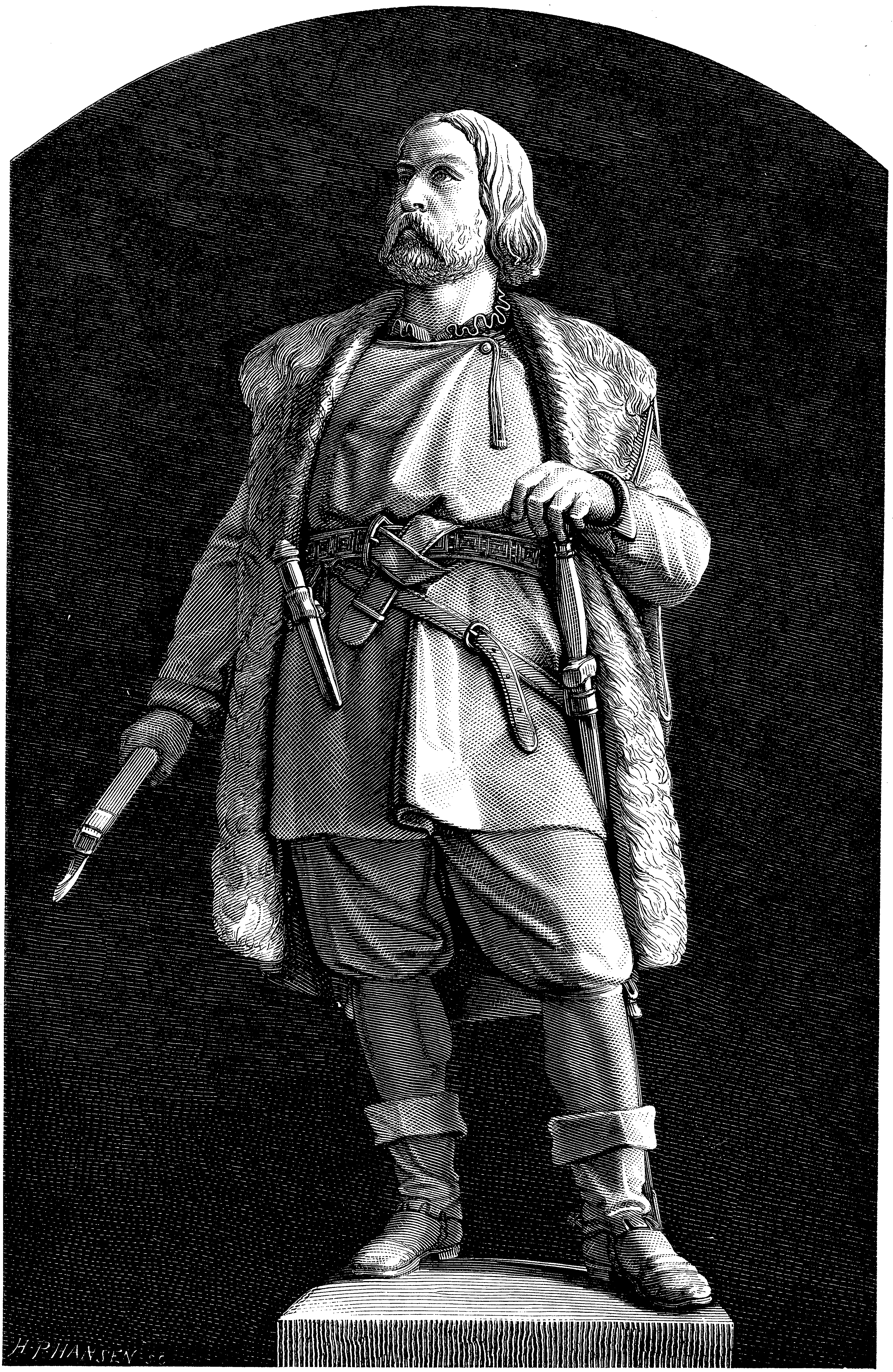
Engelbrekt Engelbrektsson in Örebro, by Carl Gustaf Qvarnström, 1865, model

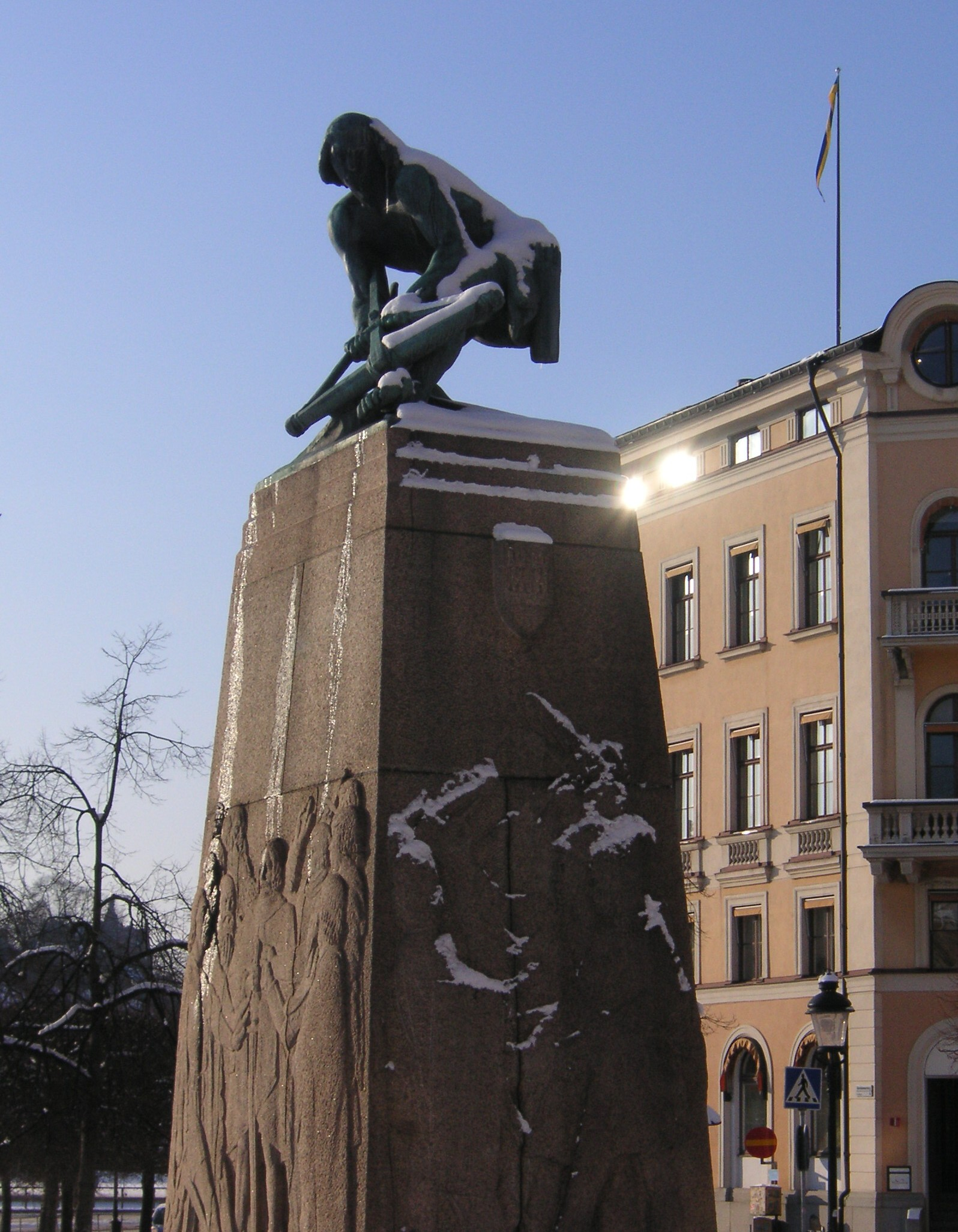
Bågspännaren in Stockholm and Rottneros Sculpture Park, by Christian Eriksson, 1916

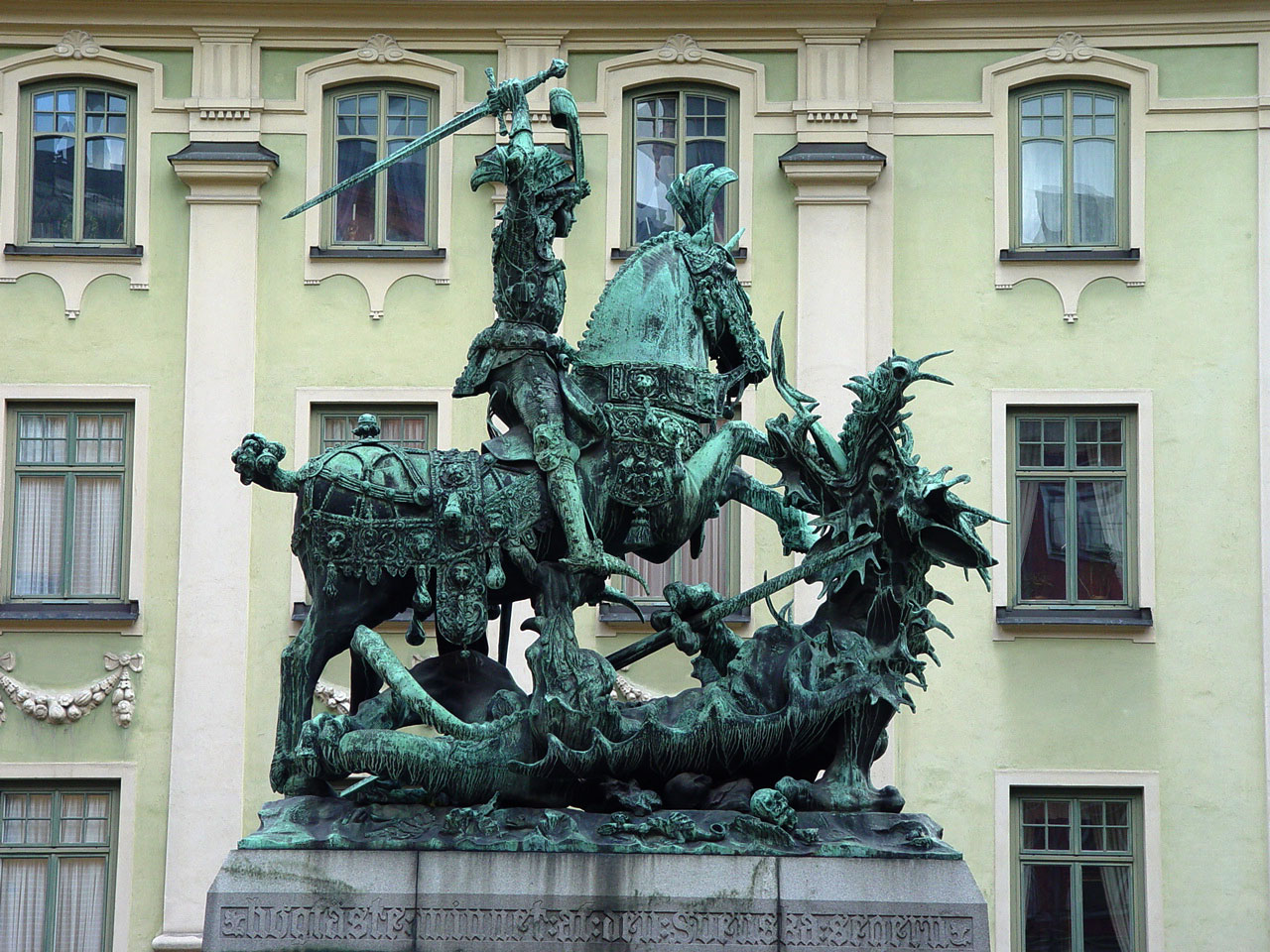
St. George and the dragon in Stockholm, probably made in Burgundy, 1489

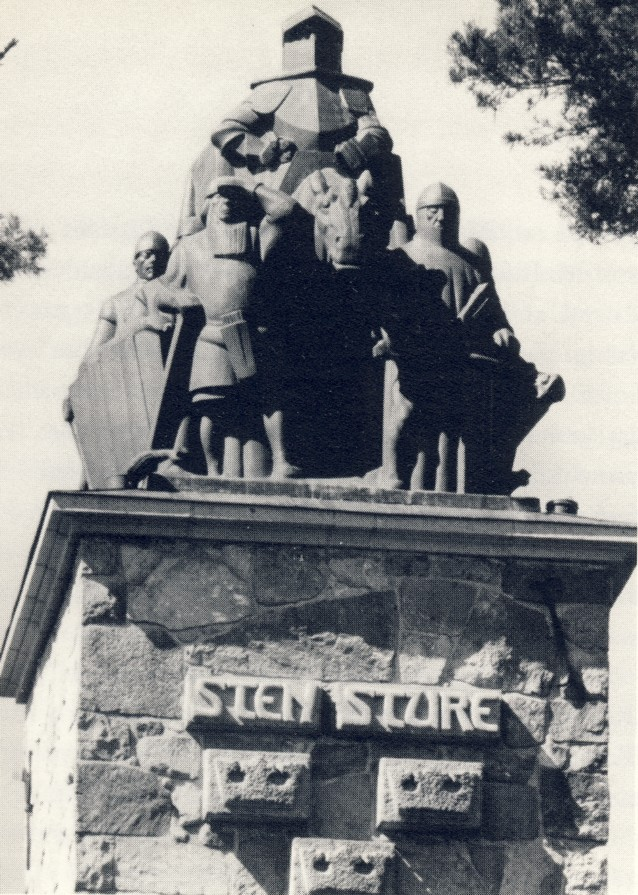
Monument to Sten Sture the Elder in Uppsala, by Carl Milles, 1925

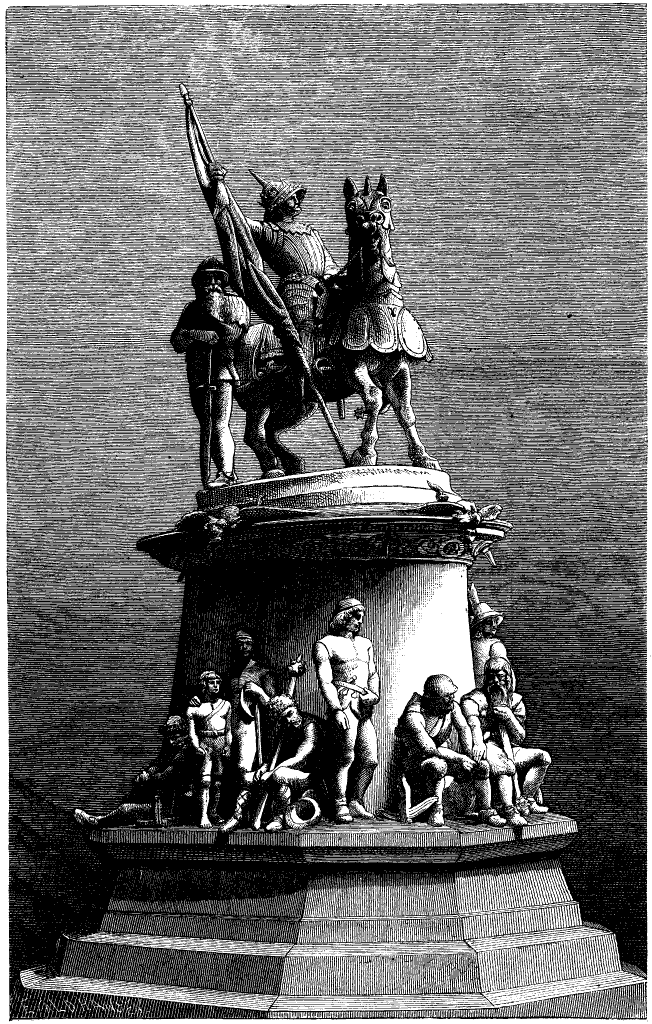
Sten Sture the Elder, maquette for an unexecuted statue at Brunkebergstorg in Stockholm, by John Börjesson, 1870s

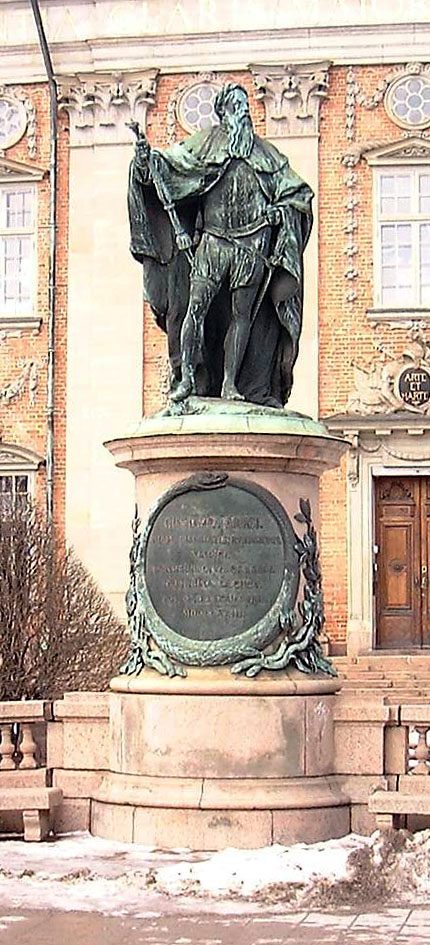
Gustav Vasa in Stockholm, by Pierre Hubert L'Archevêque, 1774

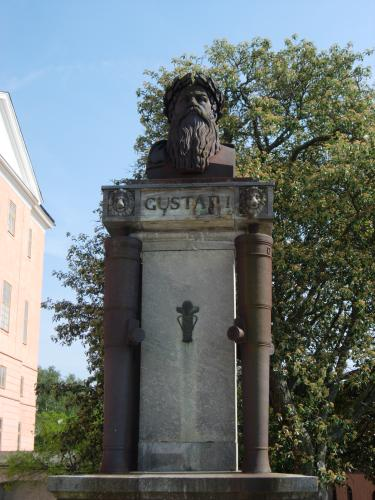
Gustav Vasa in Uppsala, by Bengt Erland Fogelberg, 1827

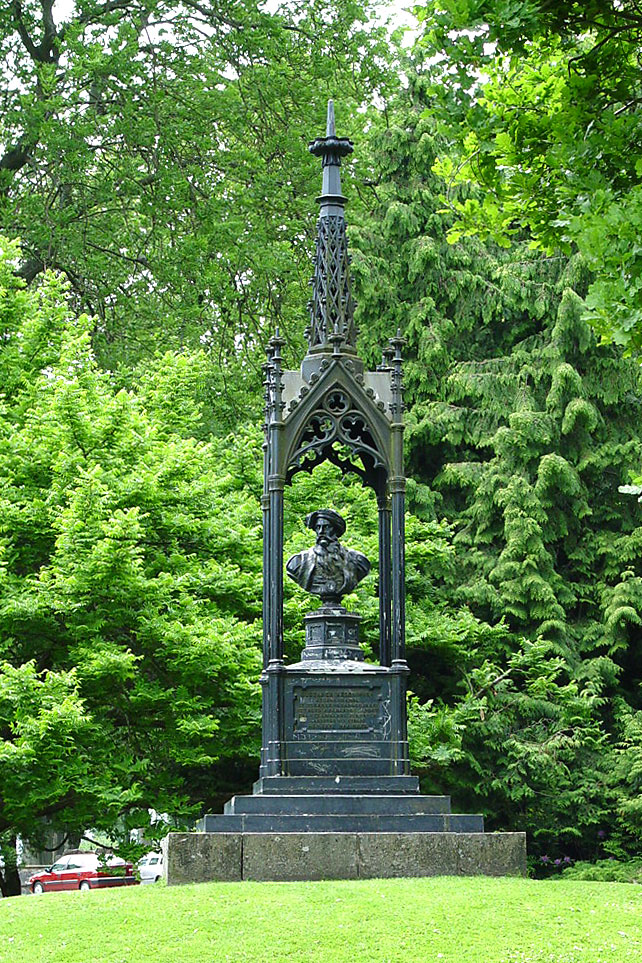
Gustav Vasa, by Johan Tobias Sergel, 1851

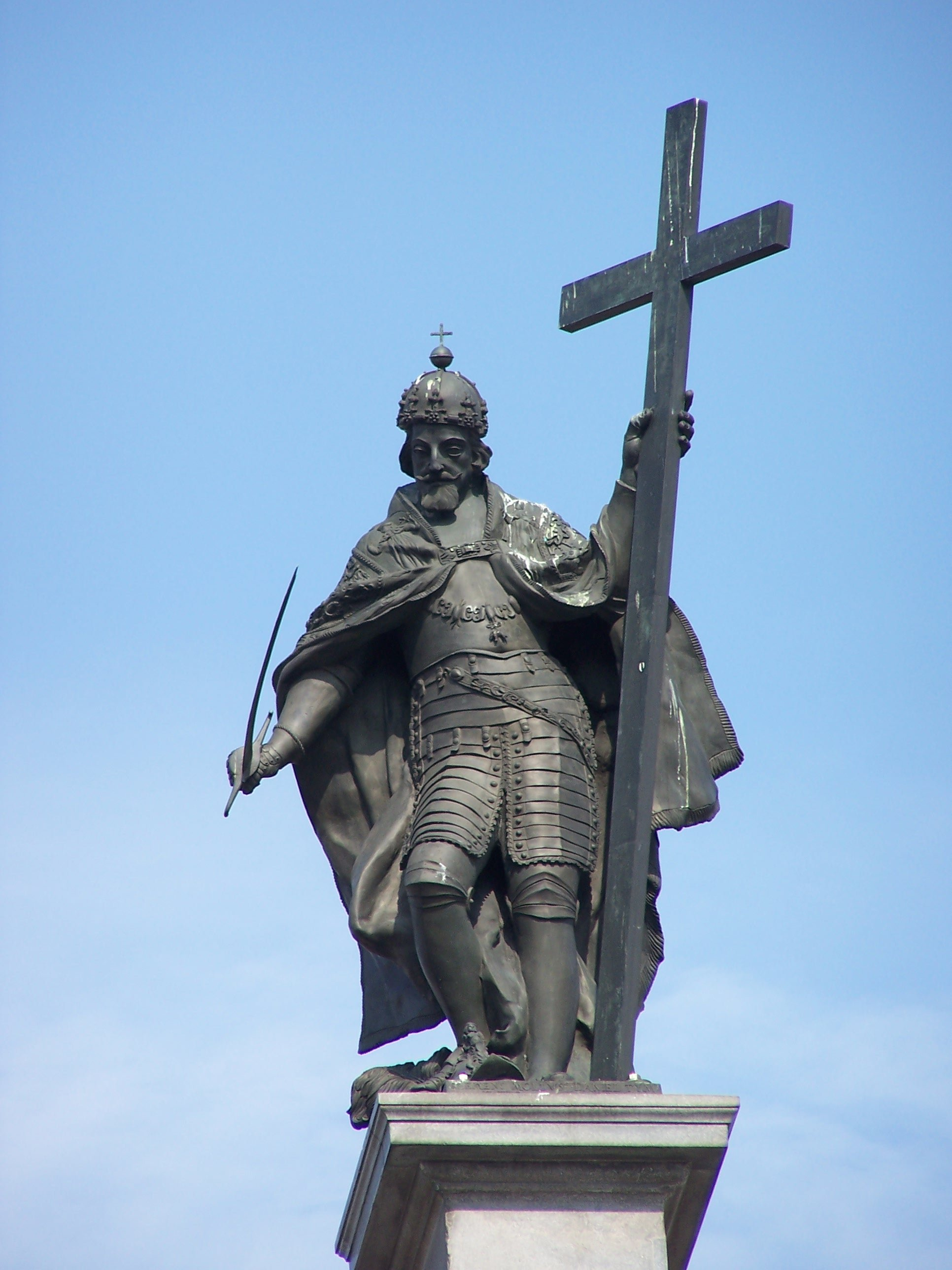
Sigismund column in Warsaw, by Clemente Molli, 1644

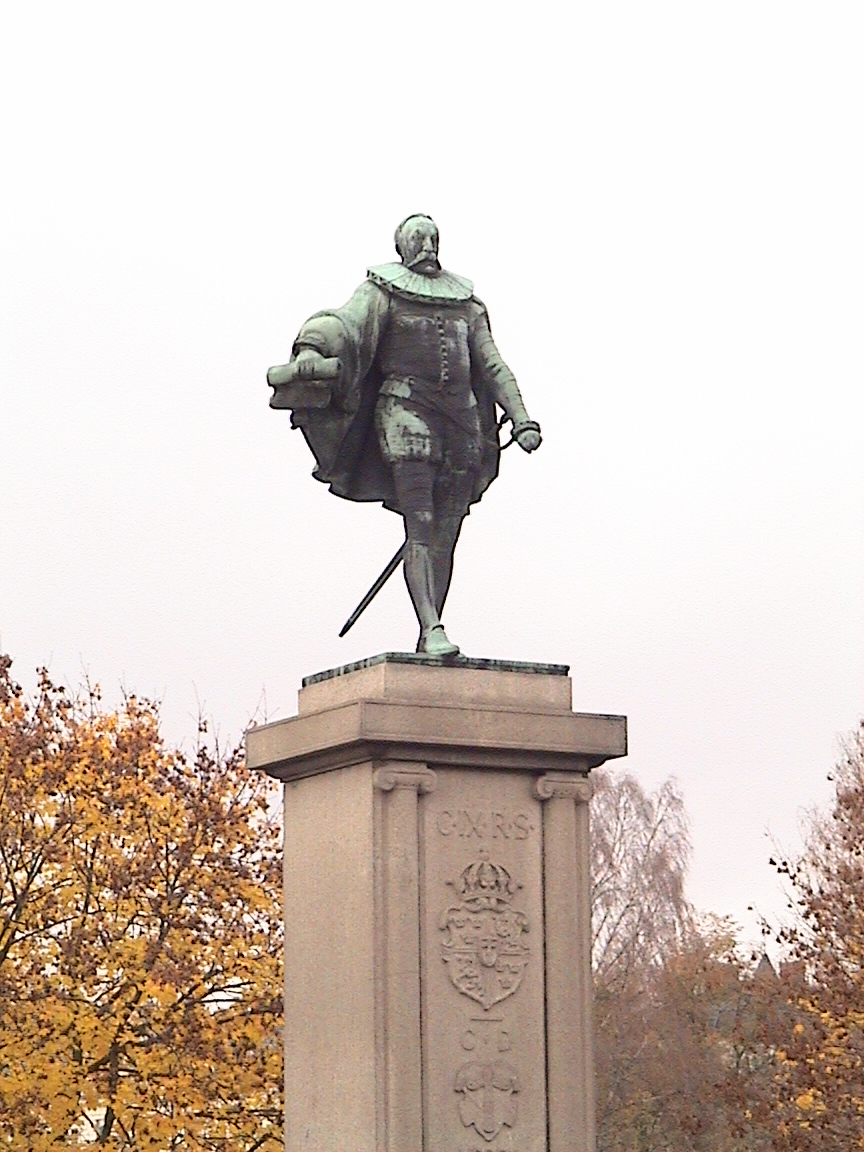
Charles IX in Karlstad, by Christian Eriksson, 1926

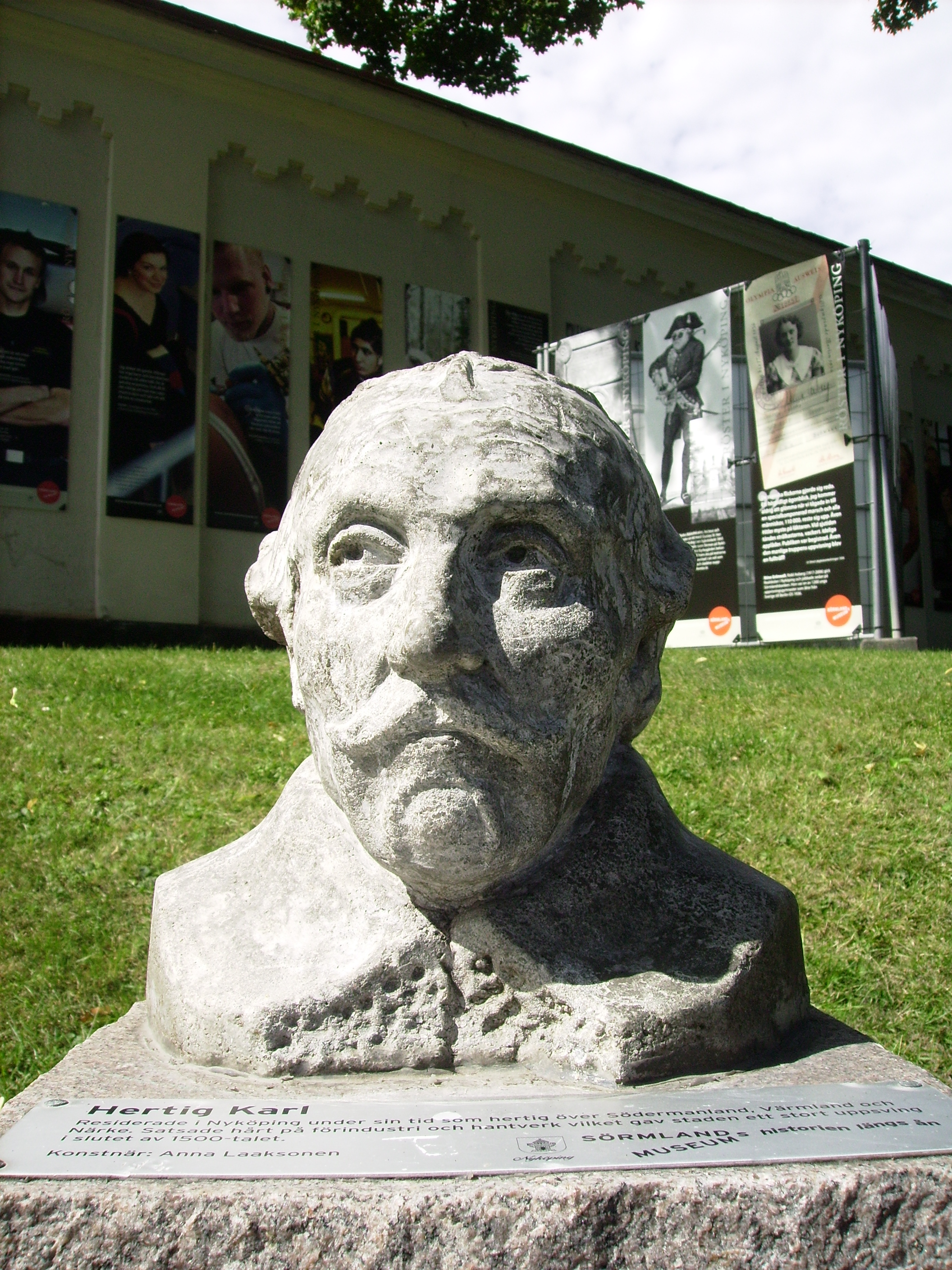
Charles IX in Nyköping, by Anna Laaksonen

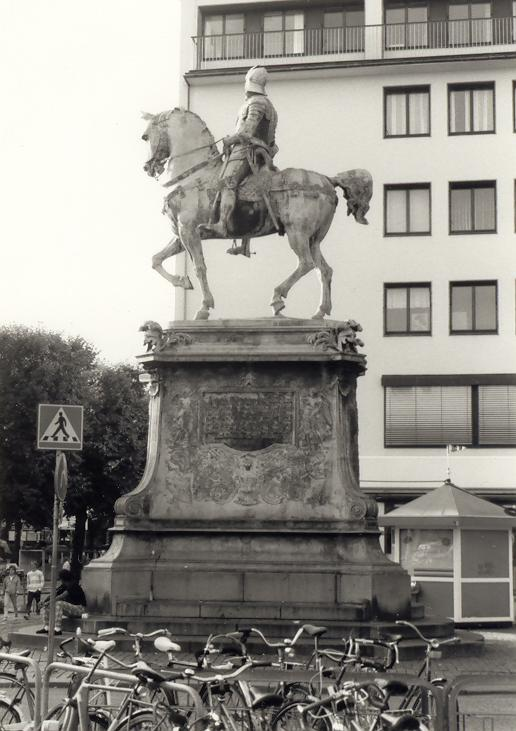
Charles IX in Gothenburg, by John Börjeson, 1904

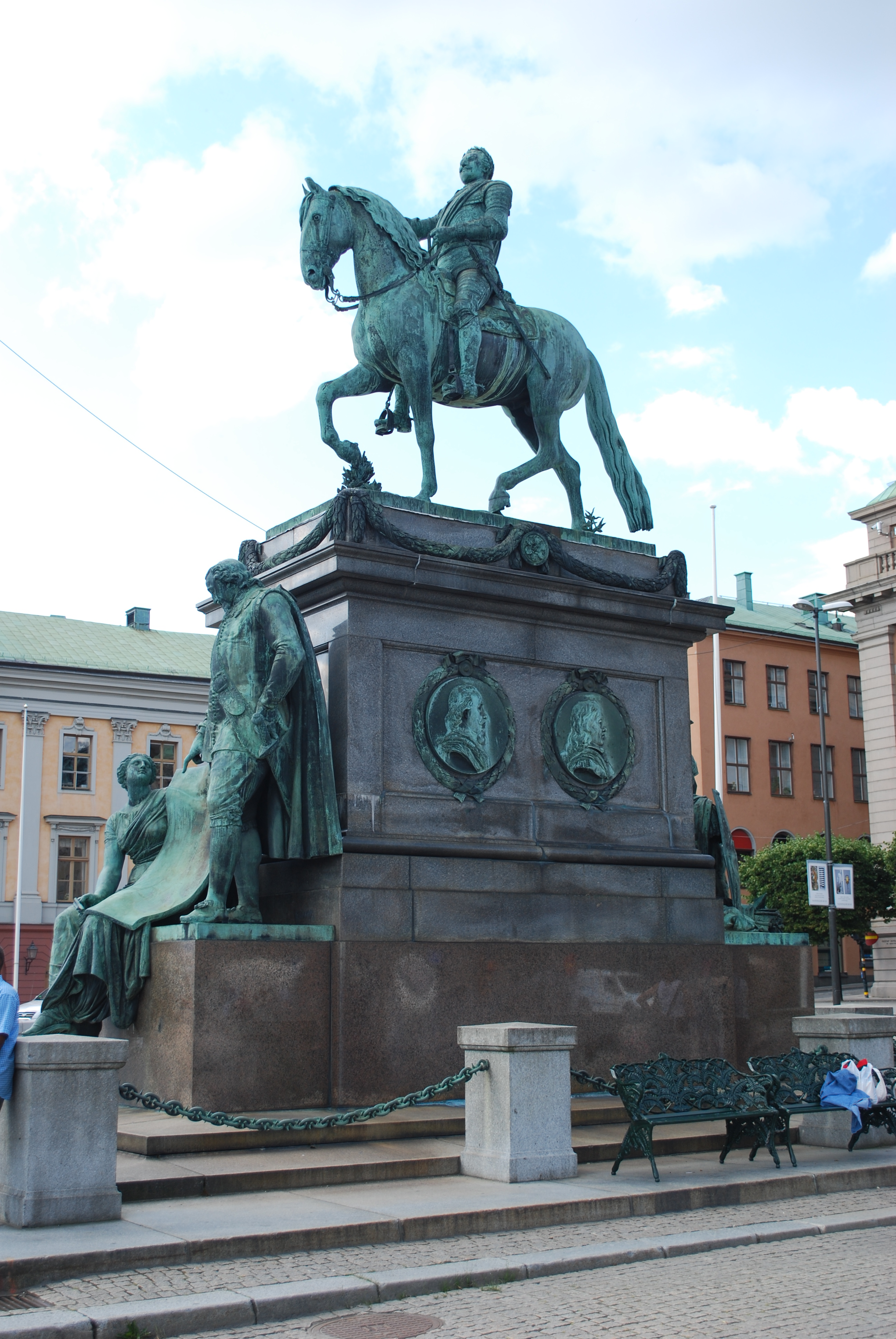
Gustavus Adolphus in Stockholm, by Pierre Hubert L'Archevêque, 1796

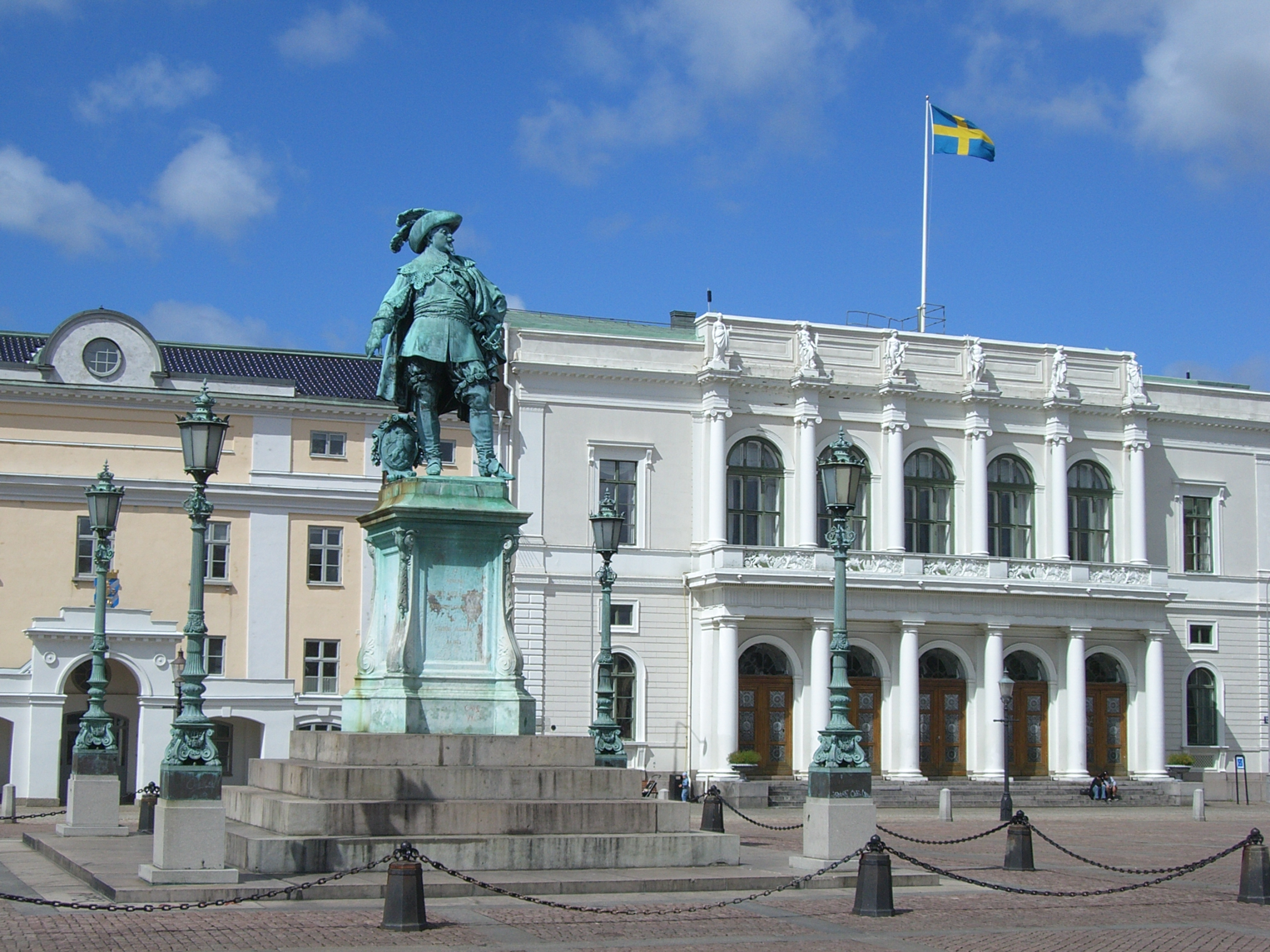
Gustavus Adolphus in Gothenburg, by Bengt Erland Fogelberg, 1854

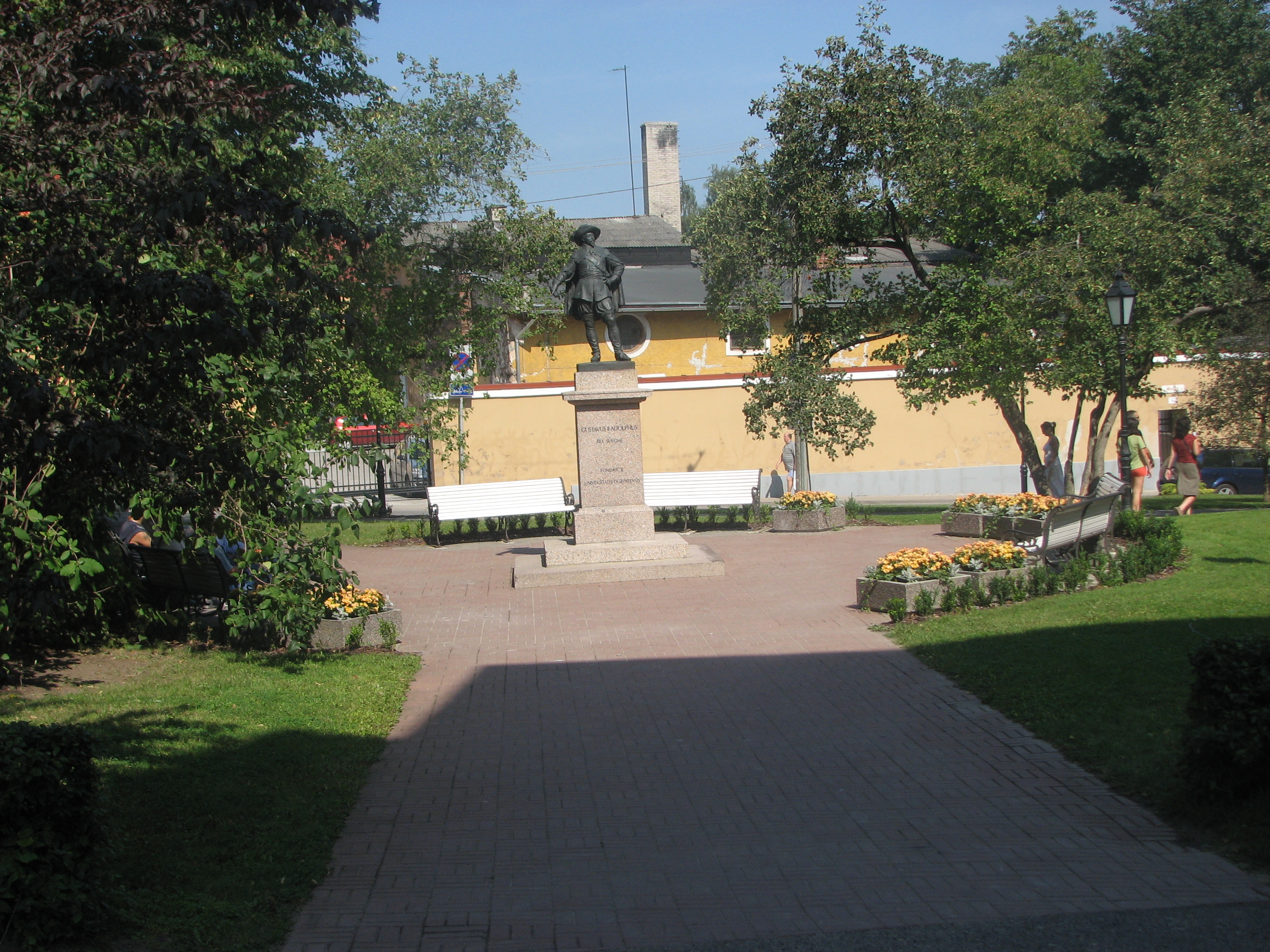
Gustavus Adolphus in Tartu, by Bengt Erland Fogelberg, copy of the Gothenburg statue

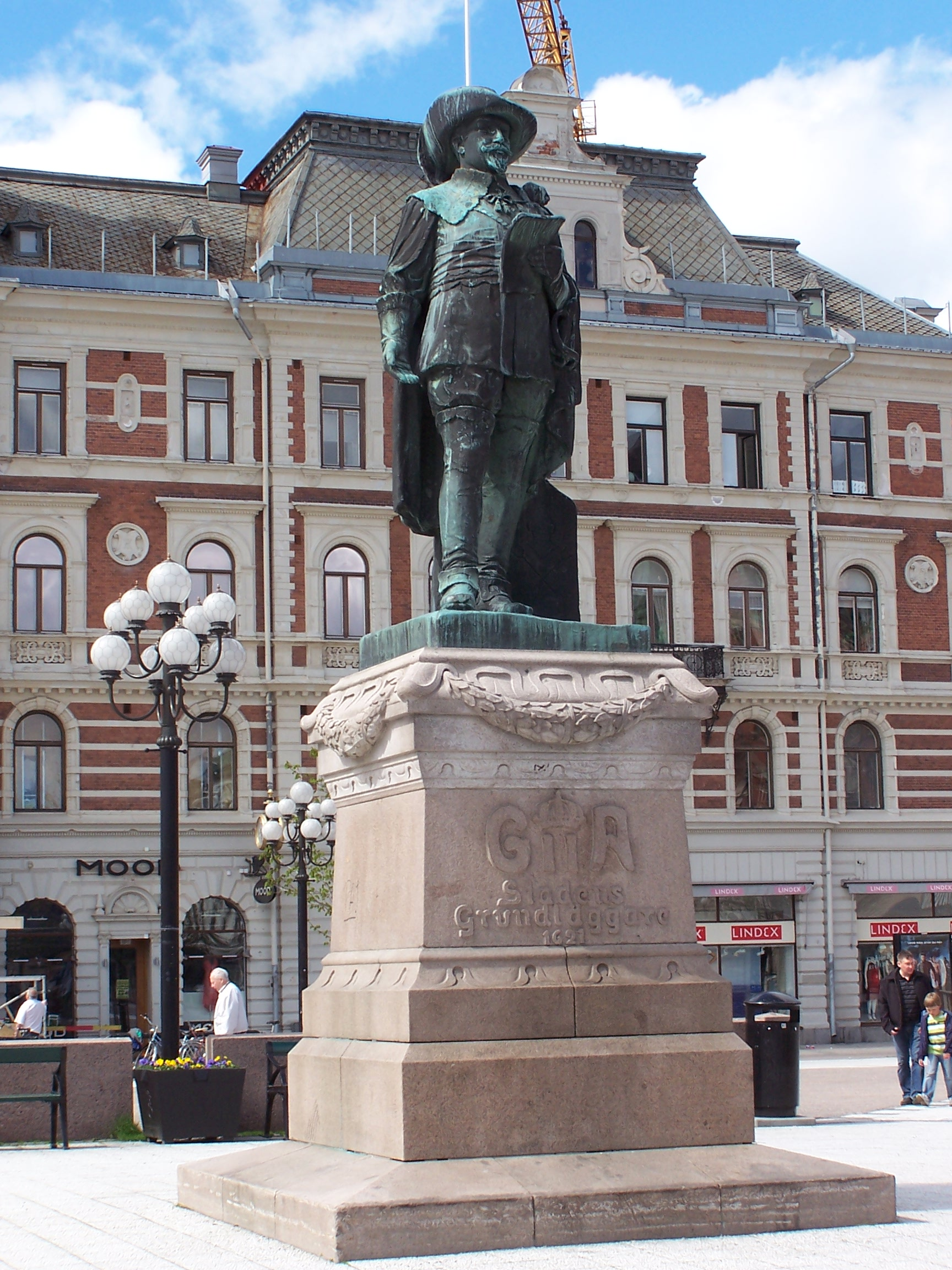
Gustavus Adolphus in Sundsvall, by Harald Sörensen-Ringi

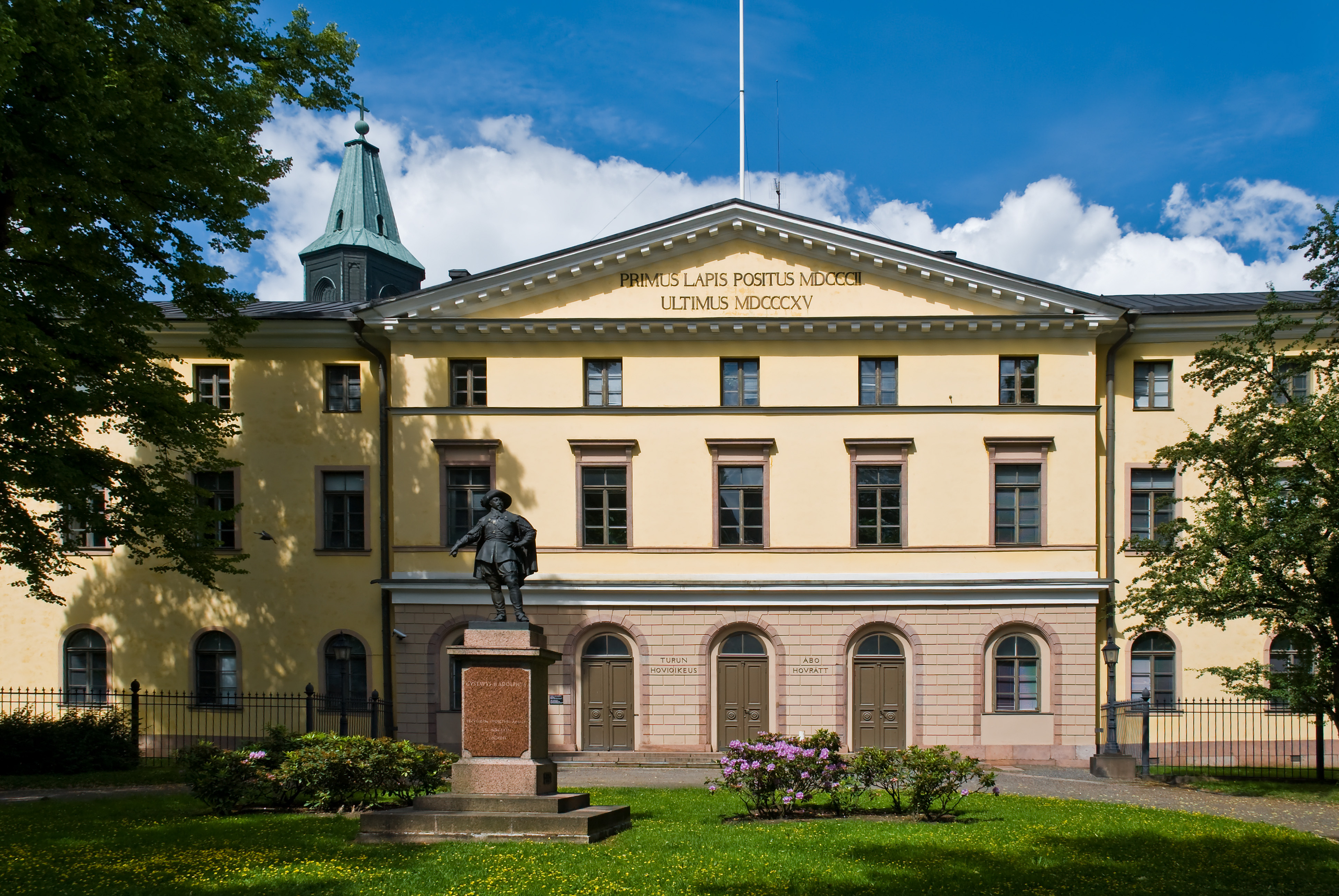
Gustavus Adolphus in Turku, by Bengt Erland Fogelberg, 1992

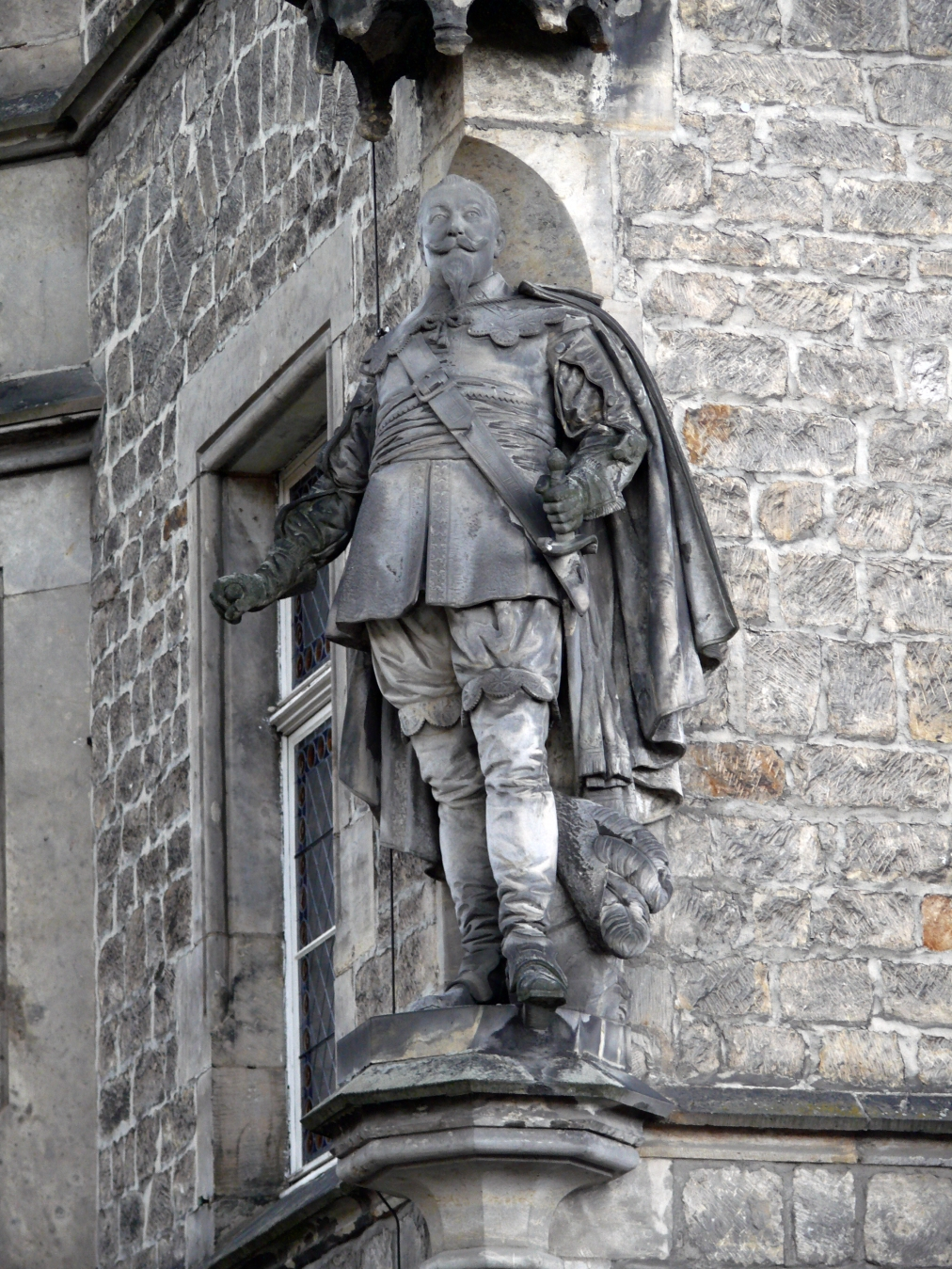
Gustavus Adolphus in Lützen, by Ludwig Brunow, 1886

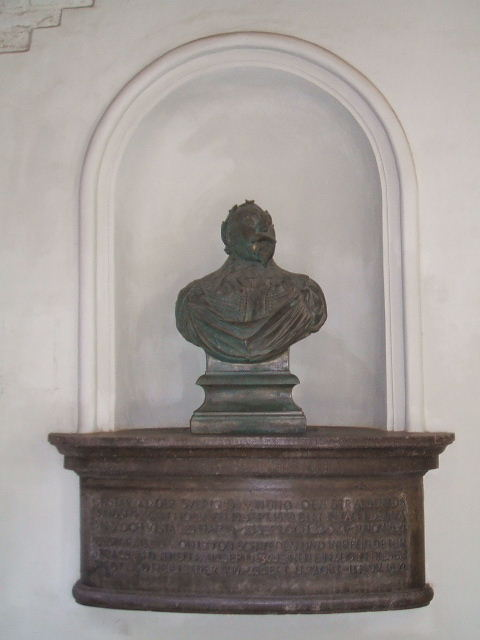
Gustavus Adolphus in Stralsund town hall

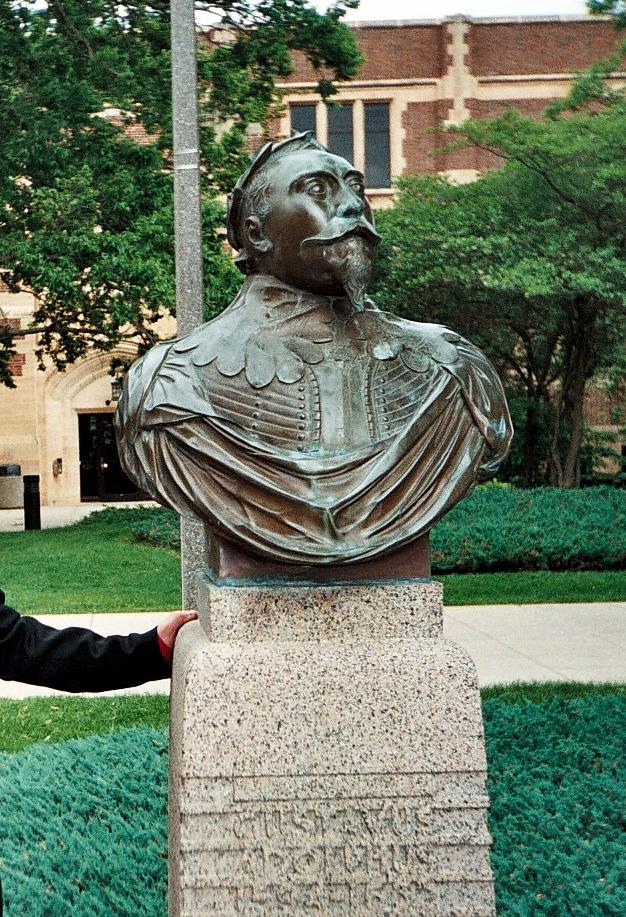
Gustavus Adolphus in St. Peter, Minnesota, 1932

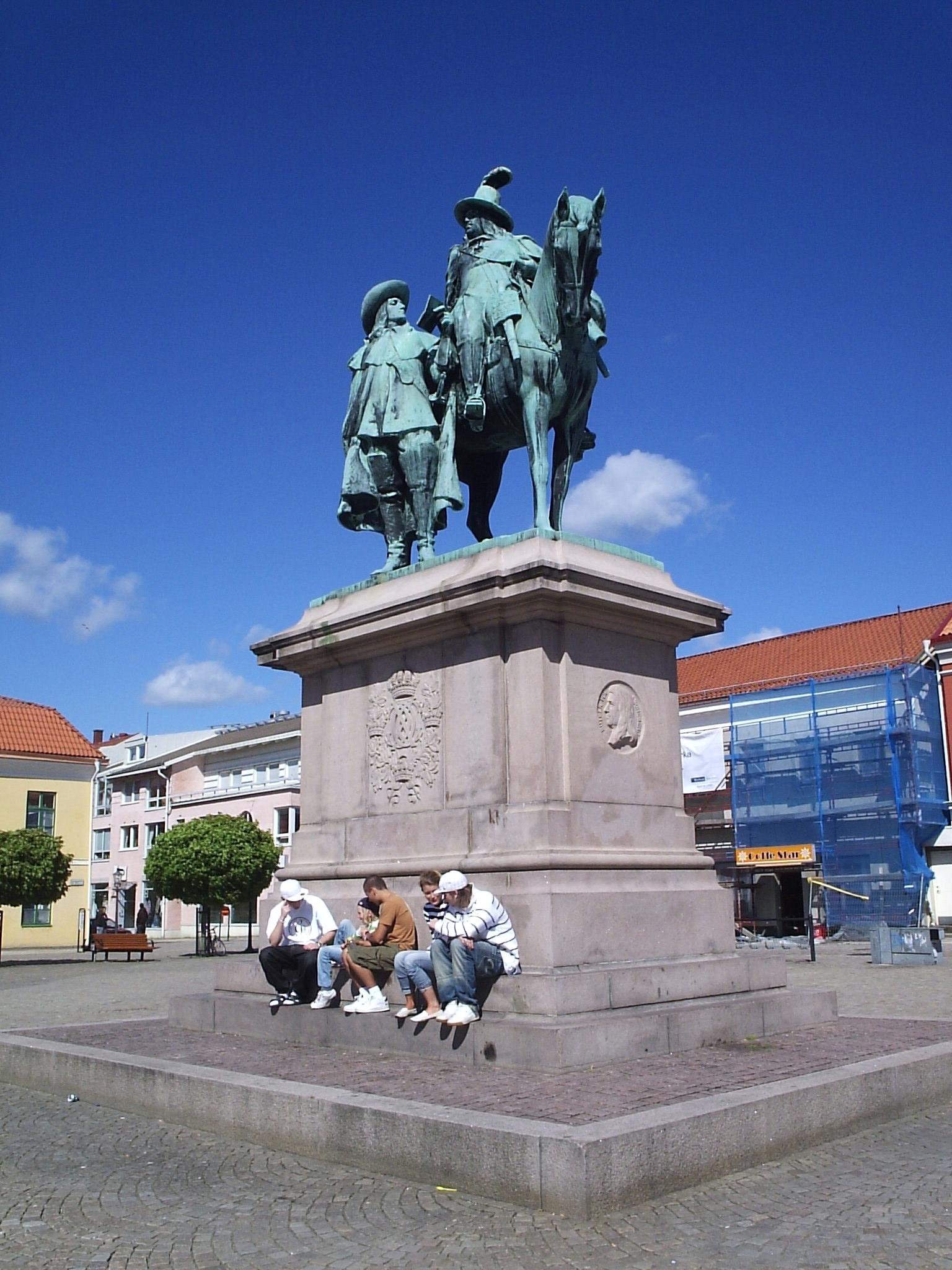
Charles X Gustav in Uddevalla, by Theodor Lundberg, 1915

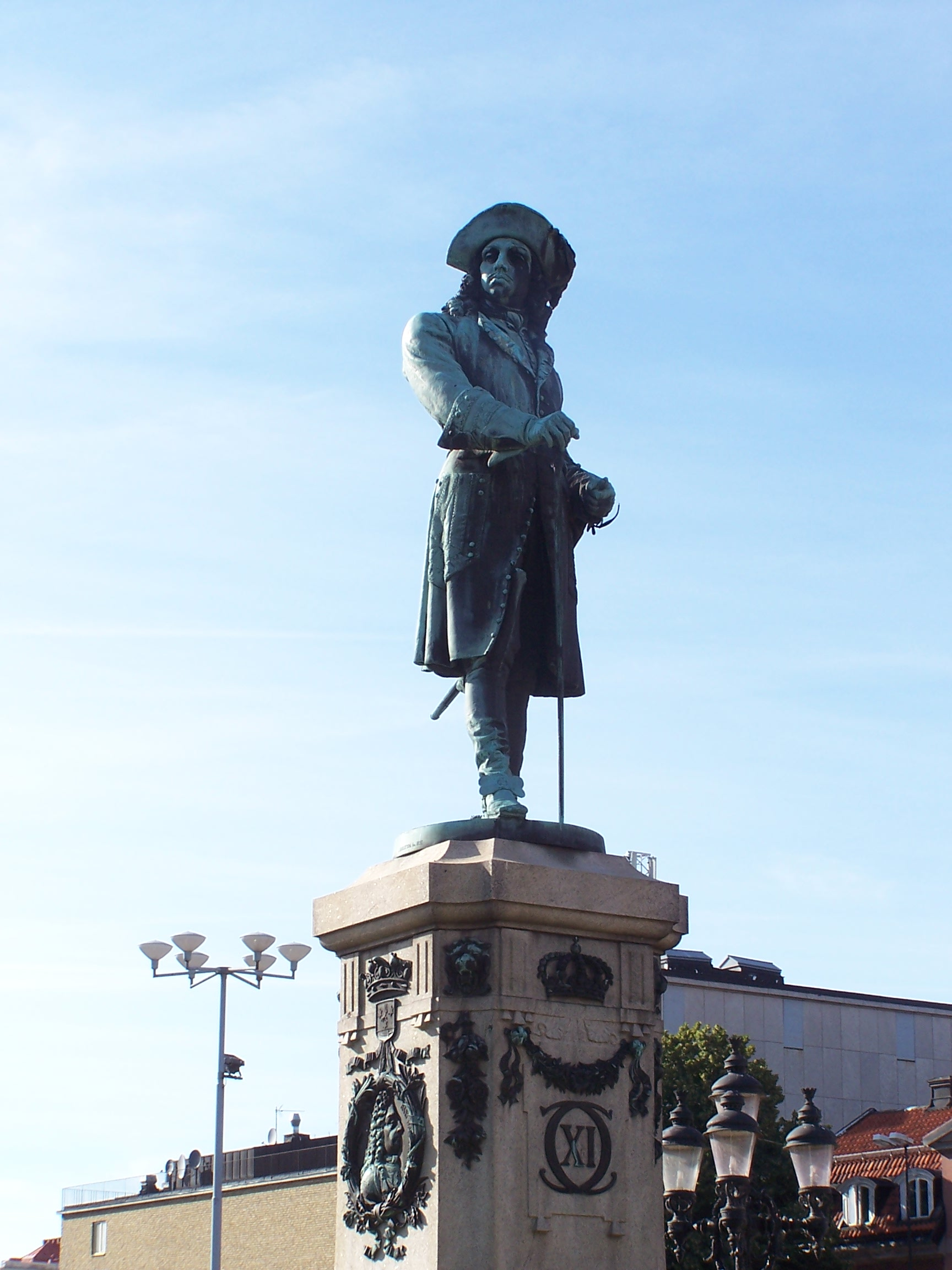
Charles XI in Karlskrona, by John Börjeson, 1897

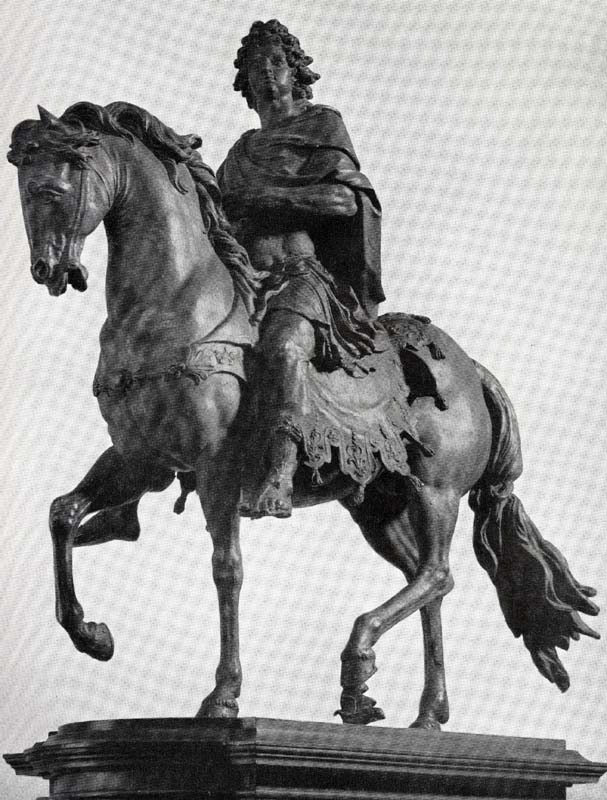
Charles XI by Bernard Foucquet, maquette, c. 1700

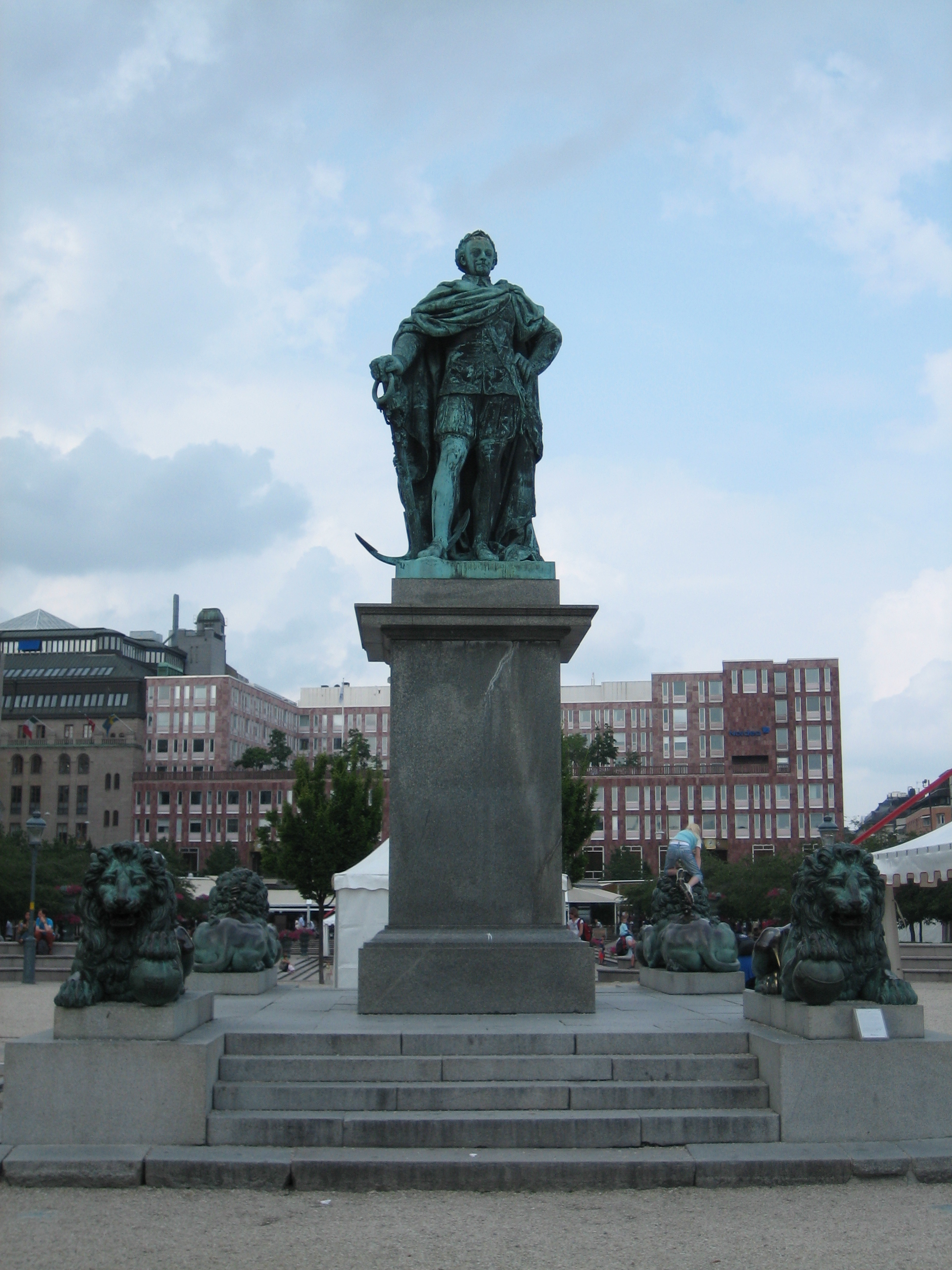
Charles XIII in Stockholm, by Erik Gustaf Göthe, 1821

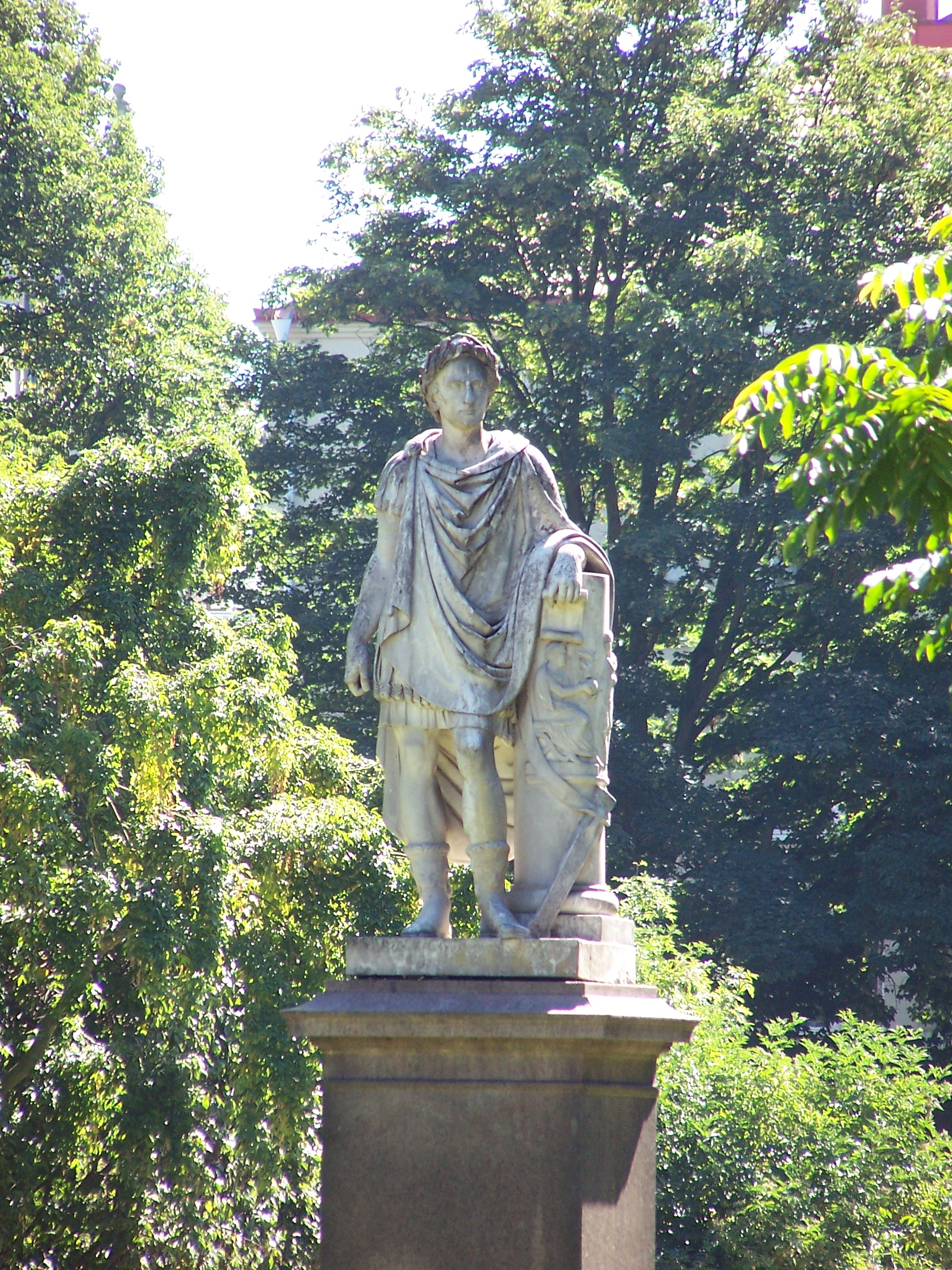
Charles XIII in Karlskrona, by Johan Niclas Byström, 1902

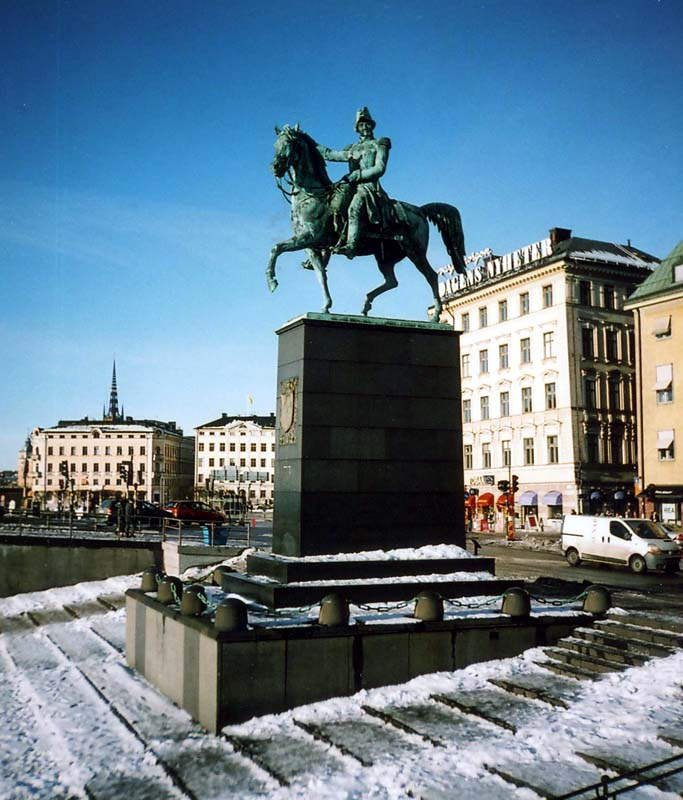
Charles XIV John in Stockholm, by Bengt Erland Fogelberg, 1854

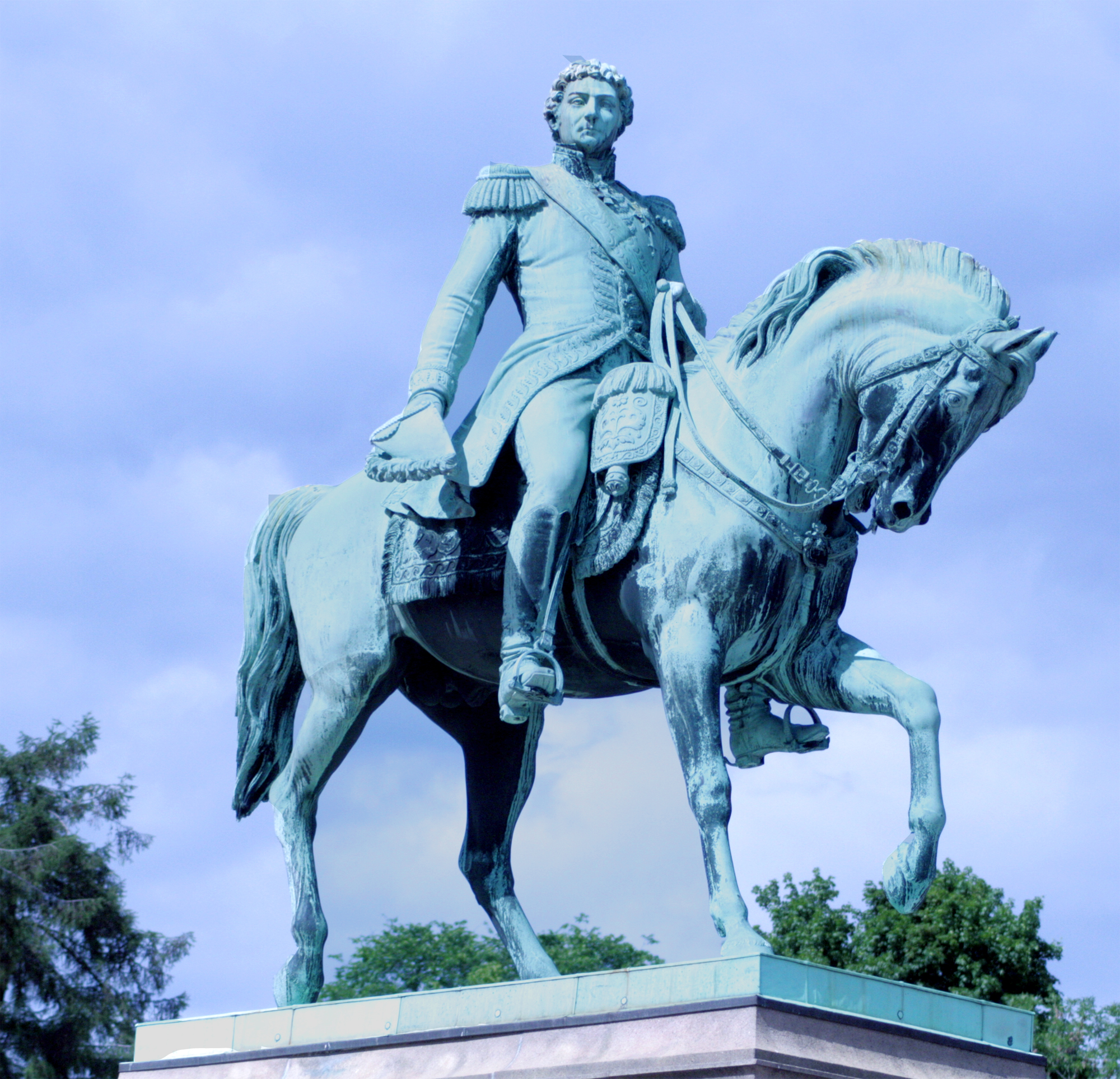
Charles XIV John in Oslo, by Brynjulf Bergslien, 1875

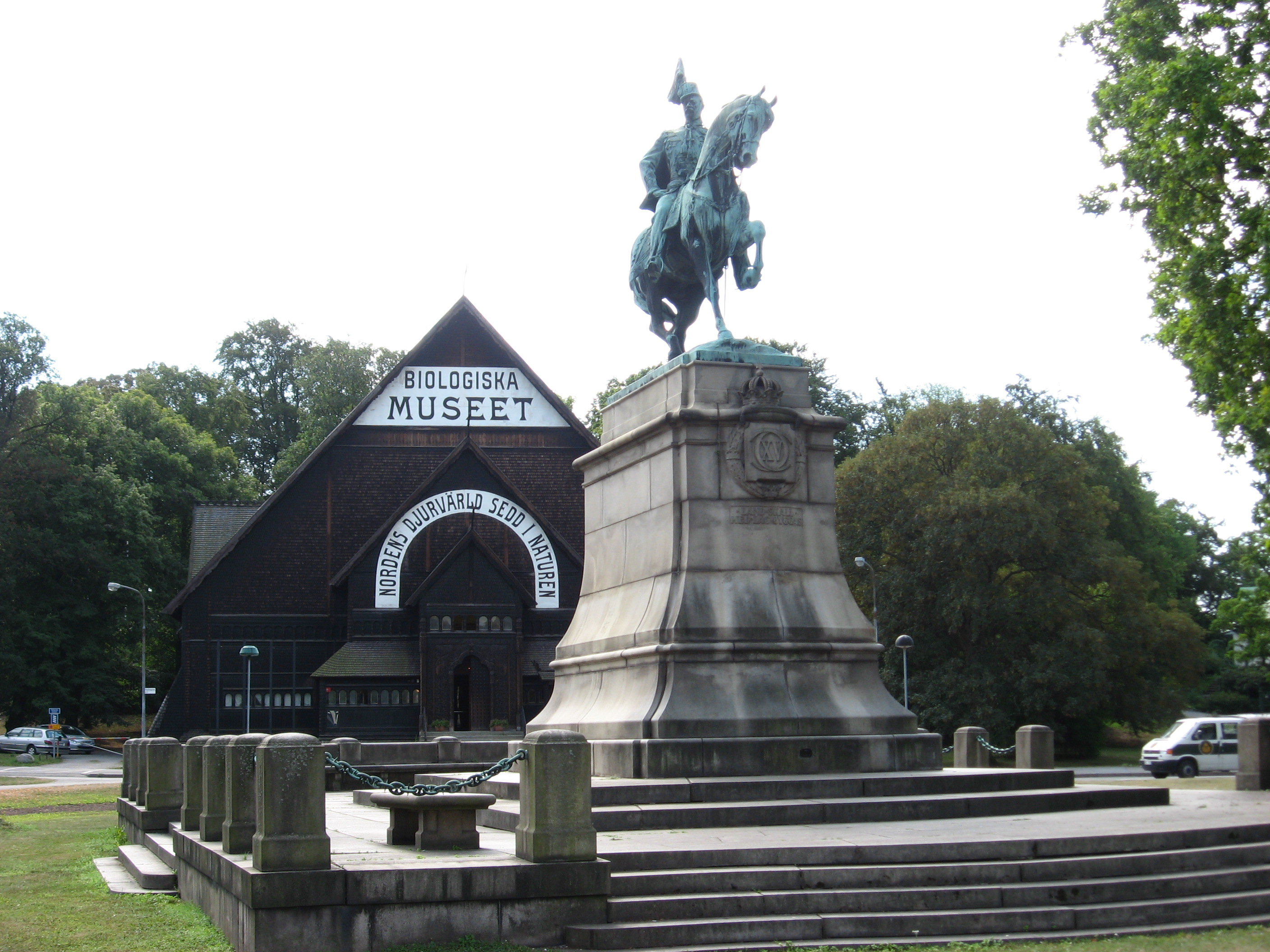
Charles XV in Stockholm, by Charles Friberg, 1909
