= Storgatan =

Storgatan may refer to:

- Storgatan, Stockholm, street in Sweden
- Storgatan, Umeå, street in Sweden
- Storgatan, Örebro, see Sculptures of Swedish rulers
