= Gustav Adolfs torg, Stockholm =

Square in central Stockholm, Sweden

Coordinates: 59.329°N 18.068°E

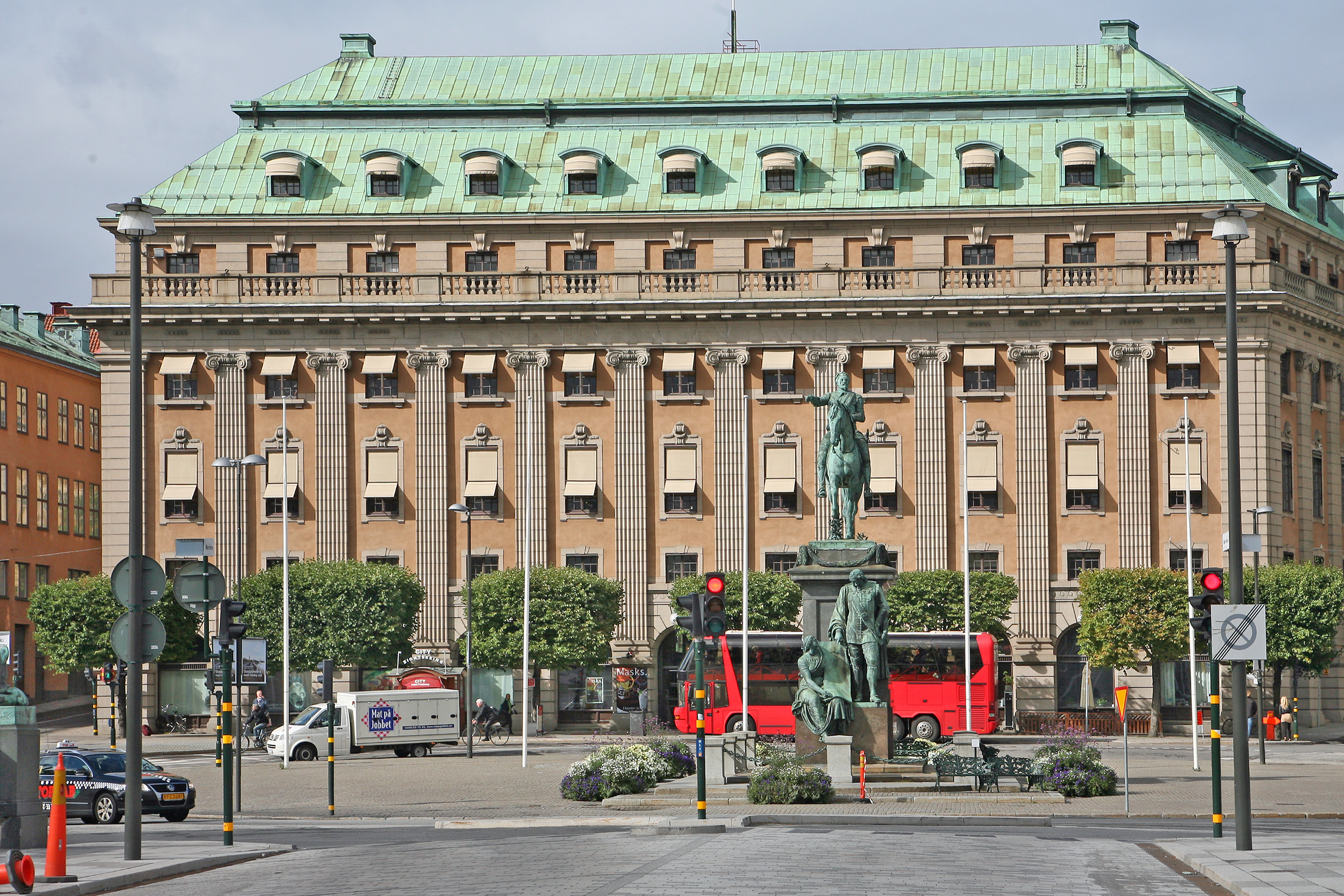
Gustav Adolfs torg centering on statue of King Gustav II Adolf

Gustav Adolfs torg is a public square in central Stockholm, Sweden.

== Description ==
The square is located in the district of Norrmalm, where Strömgatan, Fredsgatan, Malmtorgsgatan and Regeringsgatan meet. The site was named after King Gustav II Adolf. In the middle of the square there is a statue of Gustav II Adolf by the French-born, Swedish sculptor Pierre Hubert L'Archevêque (1721–1778) which was erected in 1796.

The square is home to the Royal Opera, Arvfurstens palats (housing the Ministry for Foreign Affairs) and the Ministry of Defence. South of the square are the Riksdag Building on Helgeandsholmen and the Royal Palace in Gamla stan.

== See also ==
- Norrbro
- Lejonbacken
