= Carl Gustaf Qvarnström =

Swedish sculptor and painter

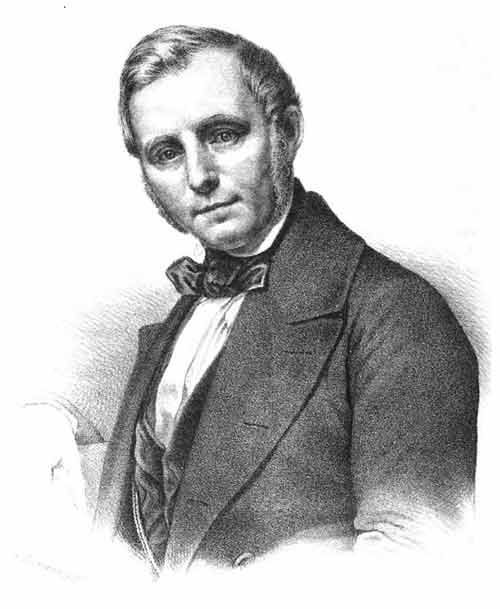
Carl Gustaf Qvarnström; from the Svea Folkkalender (1854)

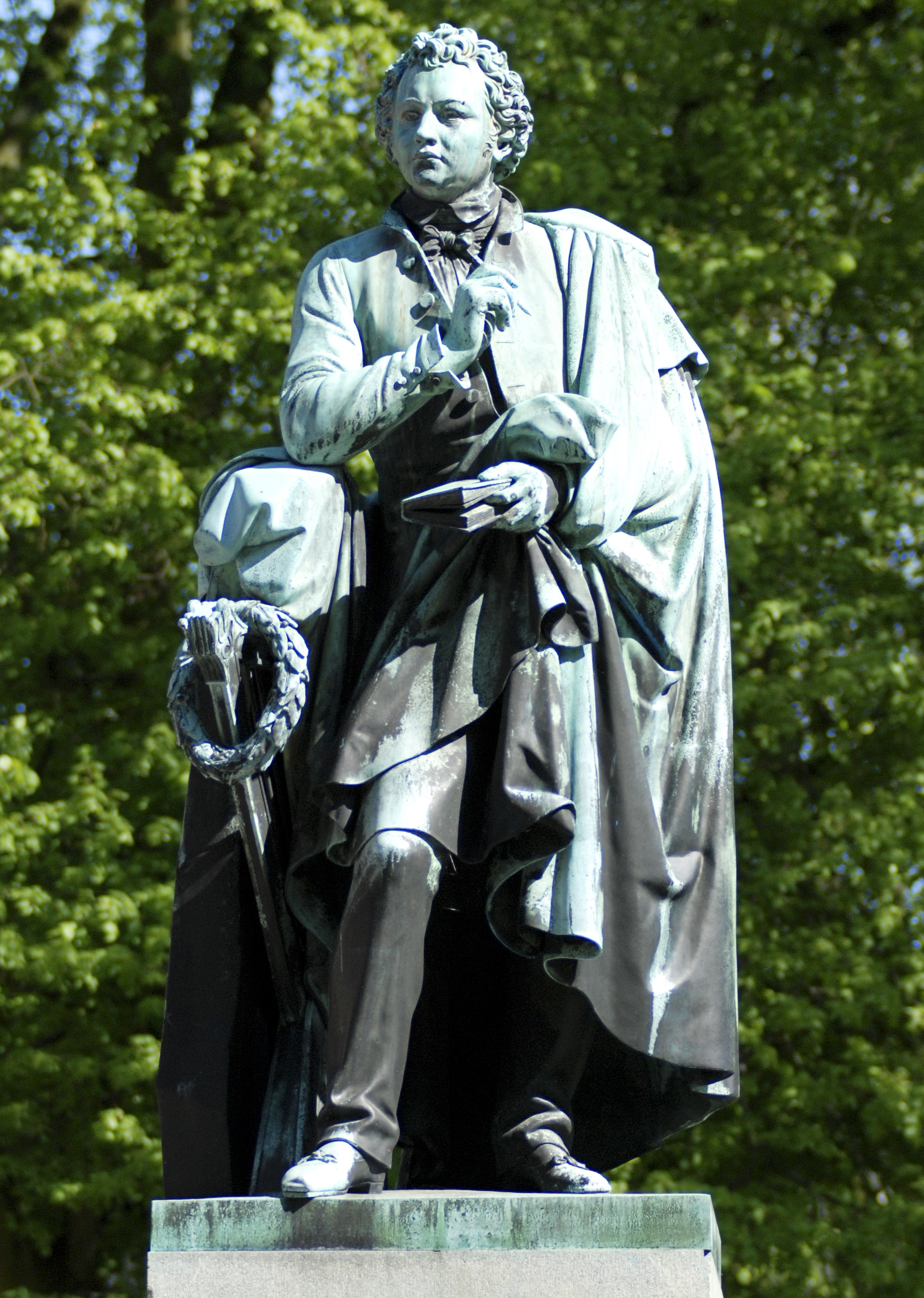
Statue of Esaias Tegnér in Lundagård

Carl Gustaf Qvarnström (23 March 1810 – 5 March 1867) was a Swedish sculptor and painter.

== Biography ==
Qvarnström was born and died in Stockholm. His father, Erik Gustaf Qvarnström, was a chamber servant (kammartjänare) for Princess Sofia Albertina. At the age of eleven, he entered the Royal Swedish Academy of Fine Arts preparatory school and won his first award when he was twelve. Some chalk portraits he did of the Royal Family led to his receiving financial support.

By the age of fourteen, he was presenting drawings at the Academy's exhibitions after studying at the modeling school, under the direction of Gustaf Erik Hasselgren and Fredric Westin. When the sculptor, Johan Niclas Byström, came home from Italy in 1829, he became his student and largely abandoned painting. Thanks to an academic fellowship, he was able to go to Italy himself in 1836 and stayed for six years; mostly in Rome.

He returned home in 1842 and became a member of the Academy; rising to the position of Vice-Professor in 1852. The following year, he became a full Professor and Director of the Academic Education Agency. During this period, he made study trips to Paris and Munich.

His works were influenced by Bengt Erland Fogelberg and Bertel Thorvaldsen, and generally reflected contemporary tastes. As a teacher, he was highly regarded and, in 1857, helped establish the Academy's landscape painting school.

Among his best known sculptures are those of Esaias Tegnér, Jöns Jacob Berzelius, Carl Adolph Agardh, Gustav II Adolf and Engelbrekt Engelbrektsson. His sketches and plaster models may be seen at the Nationalmuseum, Göteborgs museum, Museum of Sketches for Public Art, Länsmuseet Gävleborg and the Kalmar läns museum.
