= Rottneros Park =

Park in Sunne Municipality, Sweden

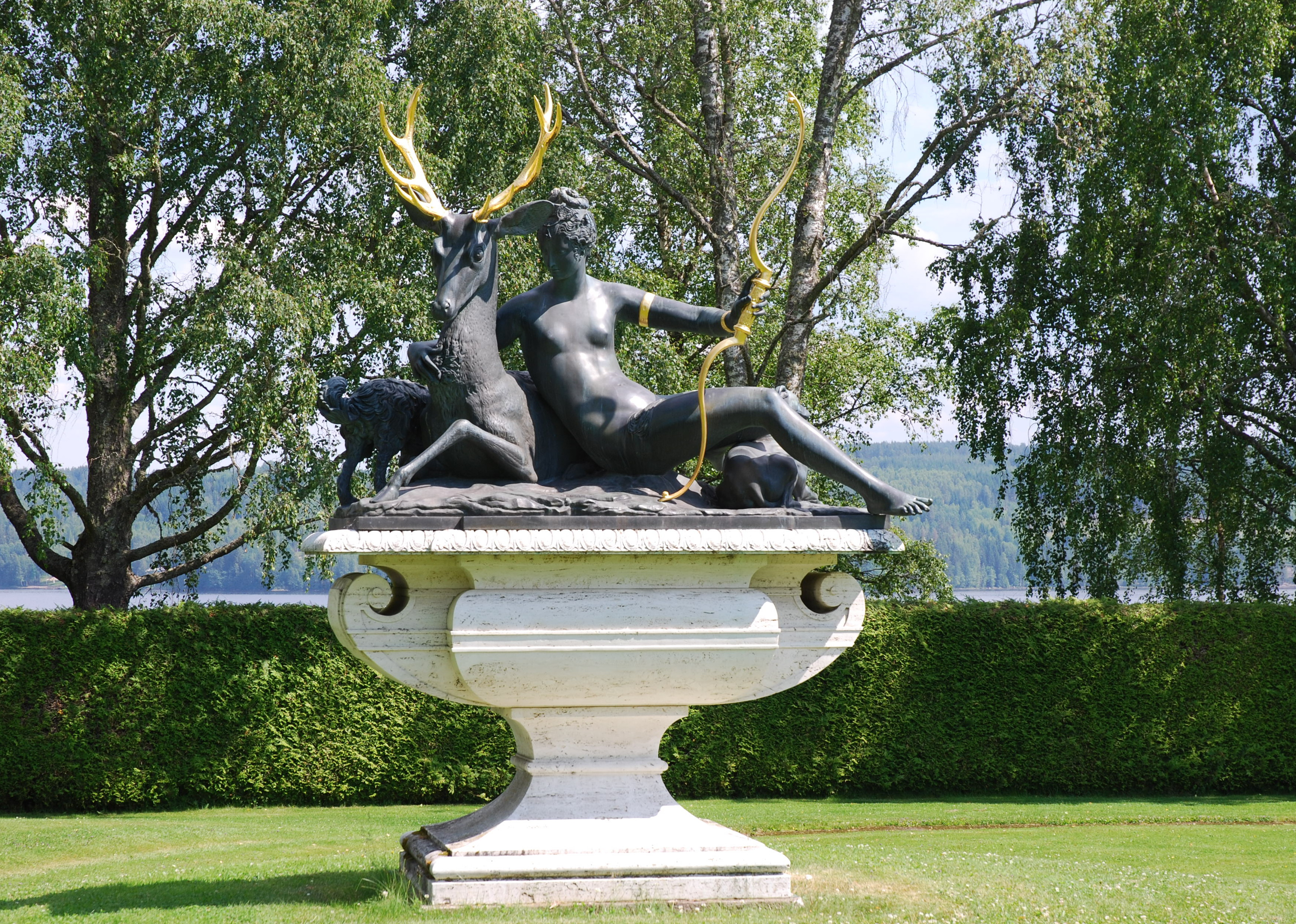
- Jean Goujon's sculpture Diana at rest at Rottneros Park
- Established: 1932
- Location: Sunne Municipality, Värmland County, Sweden
- Coordinates: 59°47′51″N 13°07′39″E
- Type: sculpture garden
- Director: Rottneros Park Trädgård AB
- Public transit access: Rottneros Station
- Website: http://rottnerospark.se/

Rottneros Park is a floral and sculpture park in Rottneros, a locality situated in Sunne Municipality (Sweden), and west of the Lake Fryken. It has an area of 22 hectares.

The park was built - starting in 1932 - by Svante Påhlson, who was at that time the miller in Rottneros and lived there in a manor house. Before that, the old manor house in Rottneros had been destroyed by a fire during the night of the feast of Saint Lucy in 1929.

In the 1950s, Påhlson constructed yet a new manor house reflecting the Ekeby from Selma Lagerlöf's novel Gösta Berling. He made sure that - as in other classical parks - the two axes (north-south and east–west axis), which intersect at the manor house, were preserved. The manor house may not be visited, because it is the private home of Påhlson's grandson.

There is no real master plan for the park. Every now and then, new sculptures are set up in the park's area. There are more than 100 sculptures. Besides the sculptures, the park contains also a huge number of flowerbeds. There is also a playground area, the Nils Holgersson's adventure park for children.

The park was part of the Interreg North Sea Project CUPIDO (Culture Power: Inspire to Develop Rural Areas) from 2019 to 2020. The CUPIDO project develops new business opportunities in the cultural and heritage sector around the North Sea. They produced short films about Värmland's cultural environments and explain why they are of national interest, one of which is Rottneros Park.

== Gallery ==
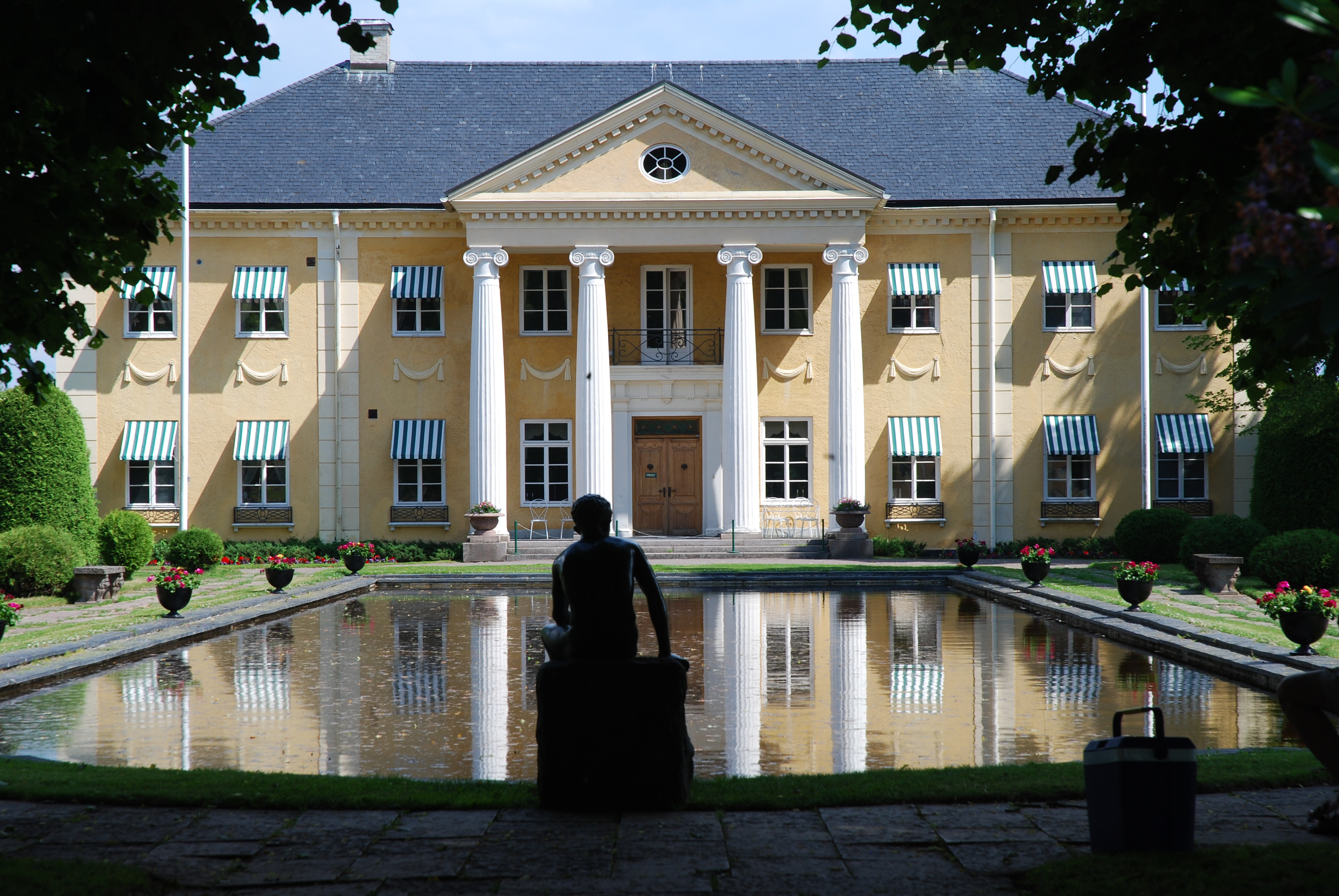
The current manor house of Rottneros. In the foreground, the Resting Hermes

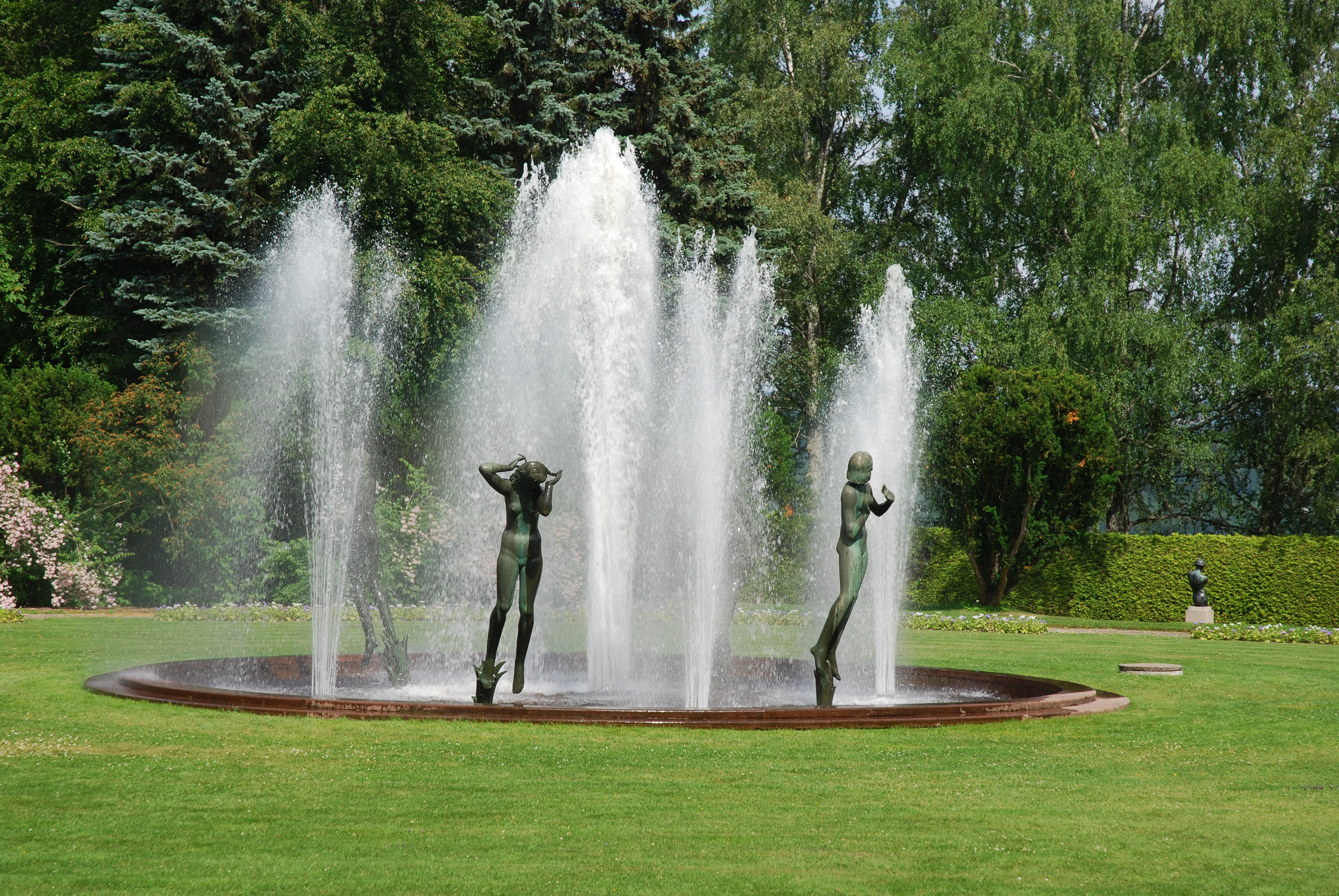
Milles Square with four female figures from the Orpheus group by Carl Milles

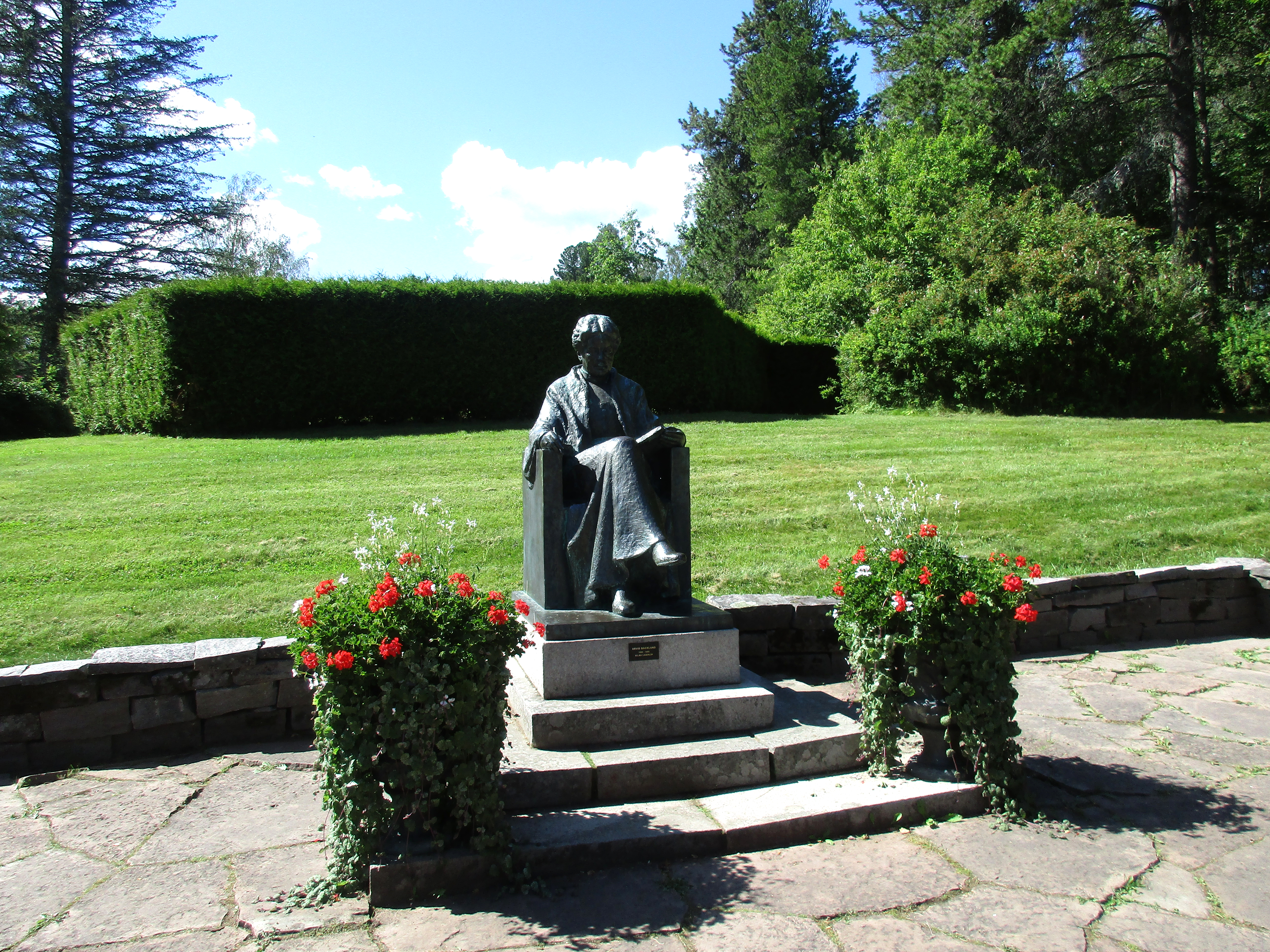
Sculpture of Selma Lagerlöf in Rottneros Park

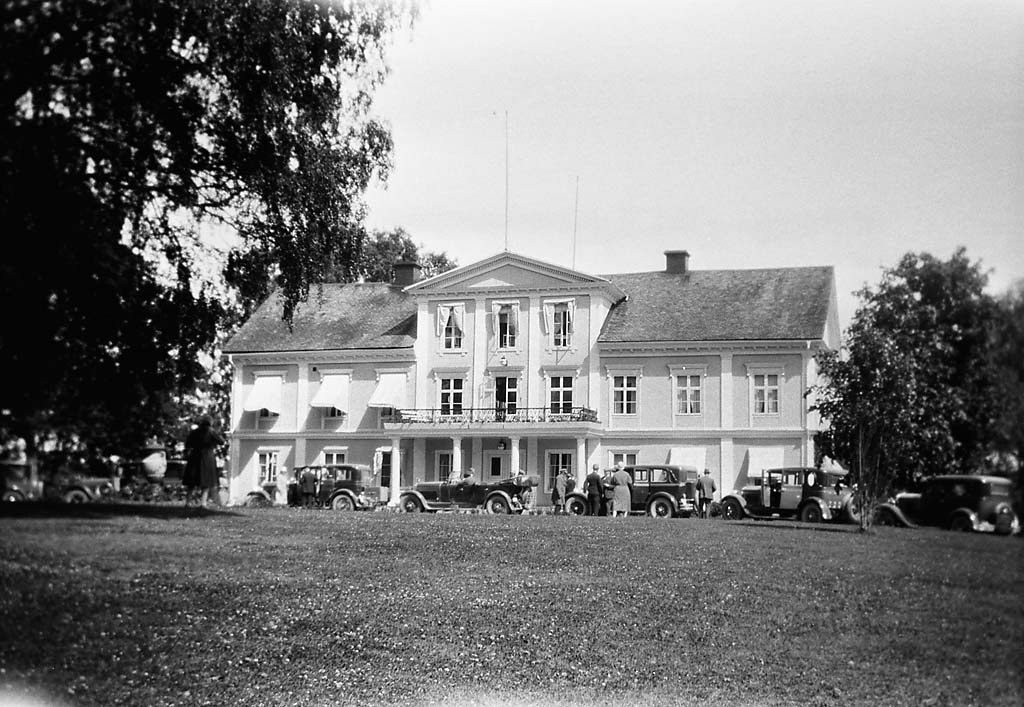
Old manor house, destroyed by the fire in 1929
