= Johan Niclas Byström =

Swedish sculptor (1783–1848)

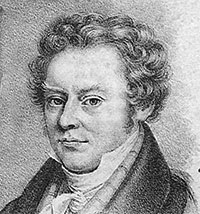
Johan Niclas Bystrom

Johan Niclas Byström (December 18, 1783 – 1848) was a Swedish sculptor.

Byström was born at Filipstad and went to Stockholm at the age of twenty, studying there for three years under Johan Tobias Sergel. In 1809 he gained the prize of the Royal Academy of Arts, and in the following year visited Rome. He sent home a beautiful work, "The Reclining Bacchante," in half life size, which raised him at once to the first rank among Swedish sculptors.

On his return to Stockholm in 1816, he presented the crown prince (the later king Charles XIV) with a colossal statue of himself, and was entrusted with several important works. Although he was appointed professor of sculpture at the academy, he soon returned to Italy, and with the exception of the years from 1838 to 1844 continued to reside there. He died in Rome in 1848.

Among Byström's numerous productions the best were his representations of the female form, such as Hebe, Pandora, Juno suckling Hercules (infra), and Girl Entering the Bath. His colossal statues of the Swedish kings were also much admired.

== Gallery ==
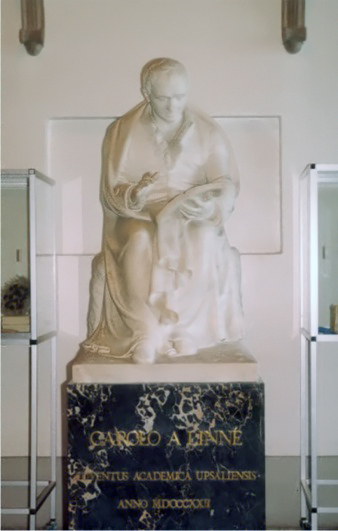
Byström's seated statue of Linnaeus, Uppsala.

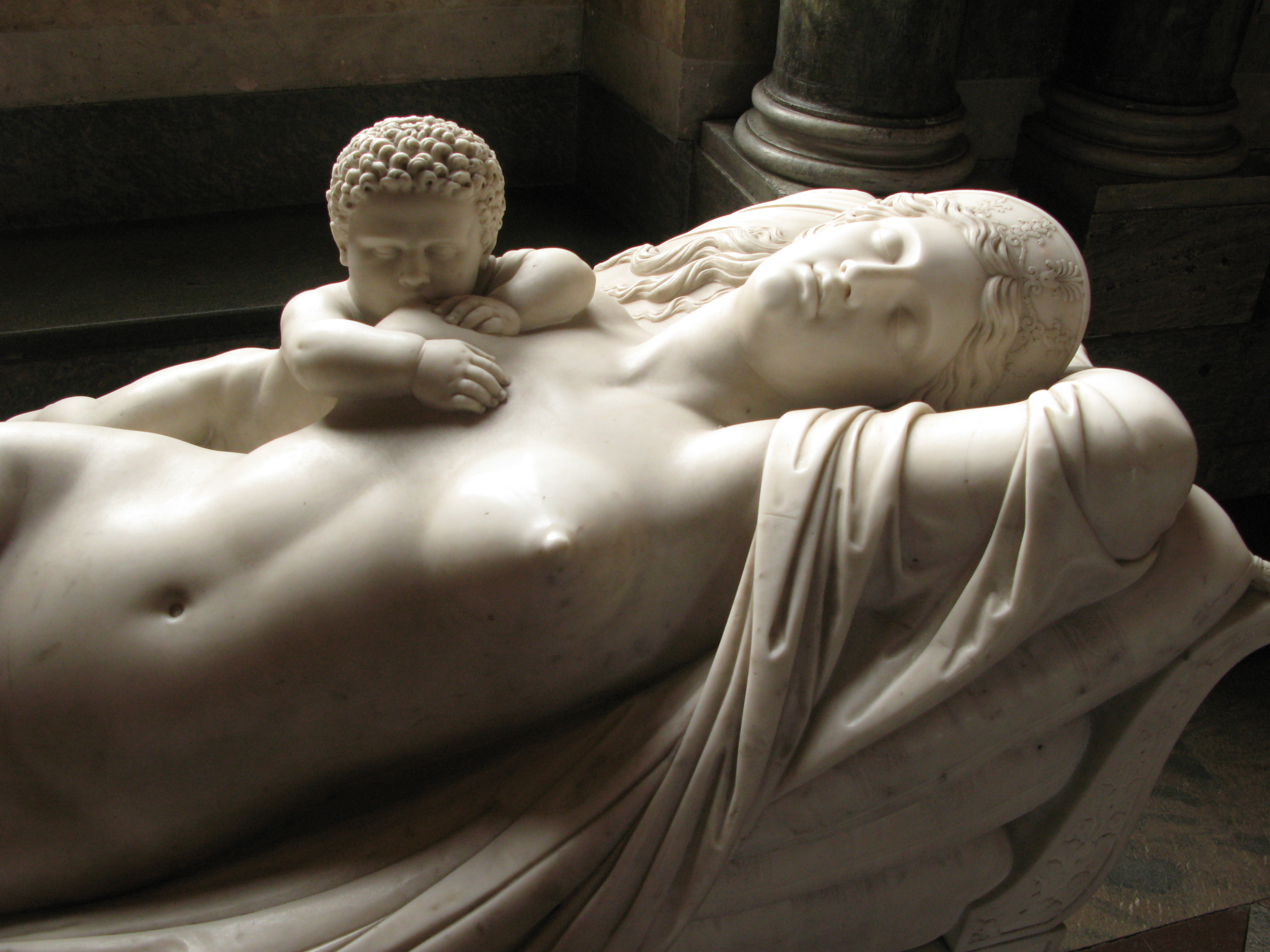
Juno suckling the infant Hercules, Royal Palace, Stockholm

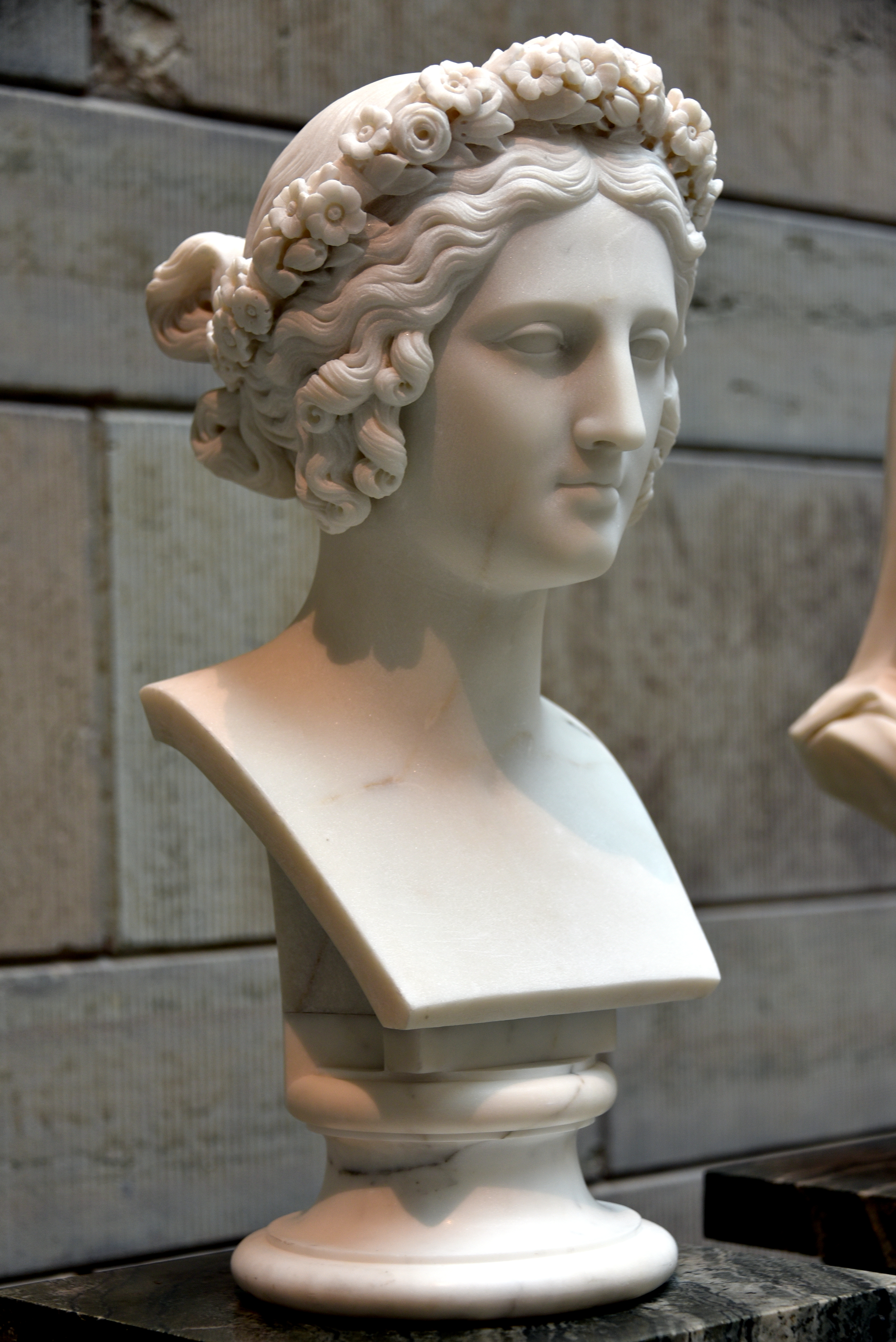
Young woman with flowers wreath in her hair, by Johan Niklas Byström. Marble. Nationalmuseum, Stockholm, Sweden

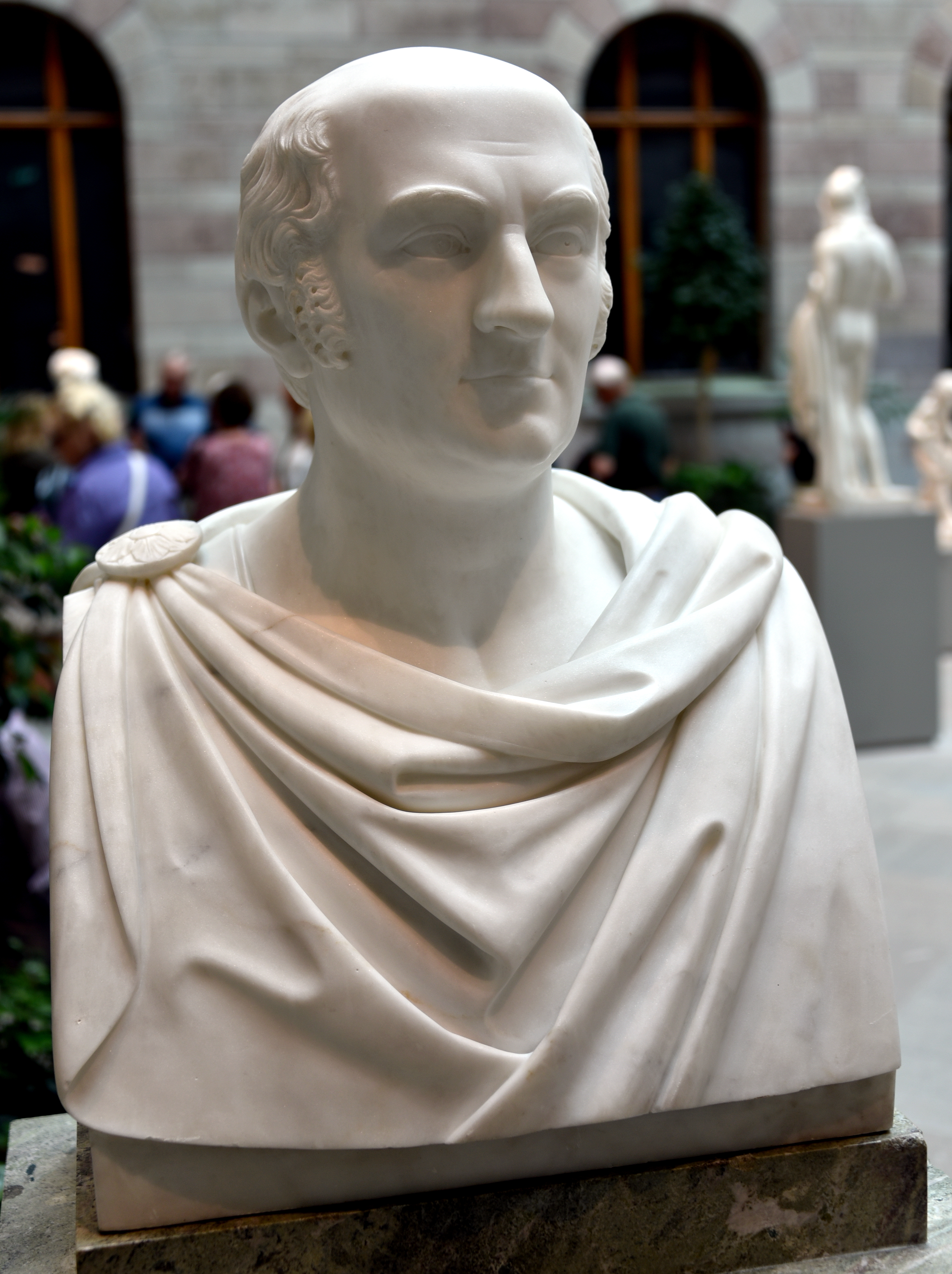
Carl Johan Adlercreutz, count, officer, and statesman, by Johan Niklas Bystroms. Marble. Nationalmuseum, Stockholm, Sweden
