= Pierre Hubert L'Archevêque =

Swedish sculptor (1721–1778)

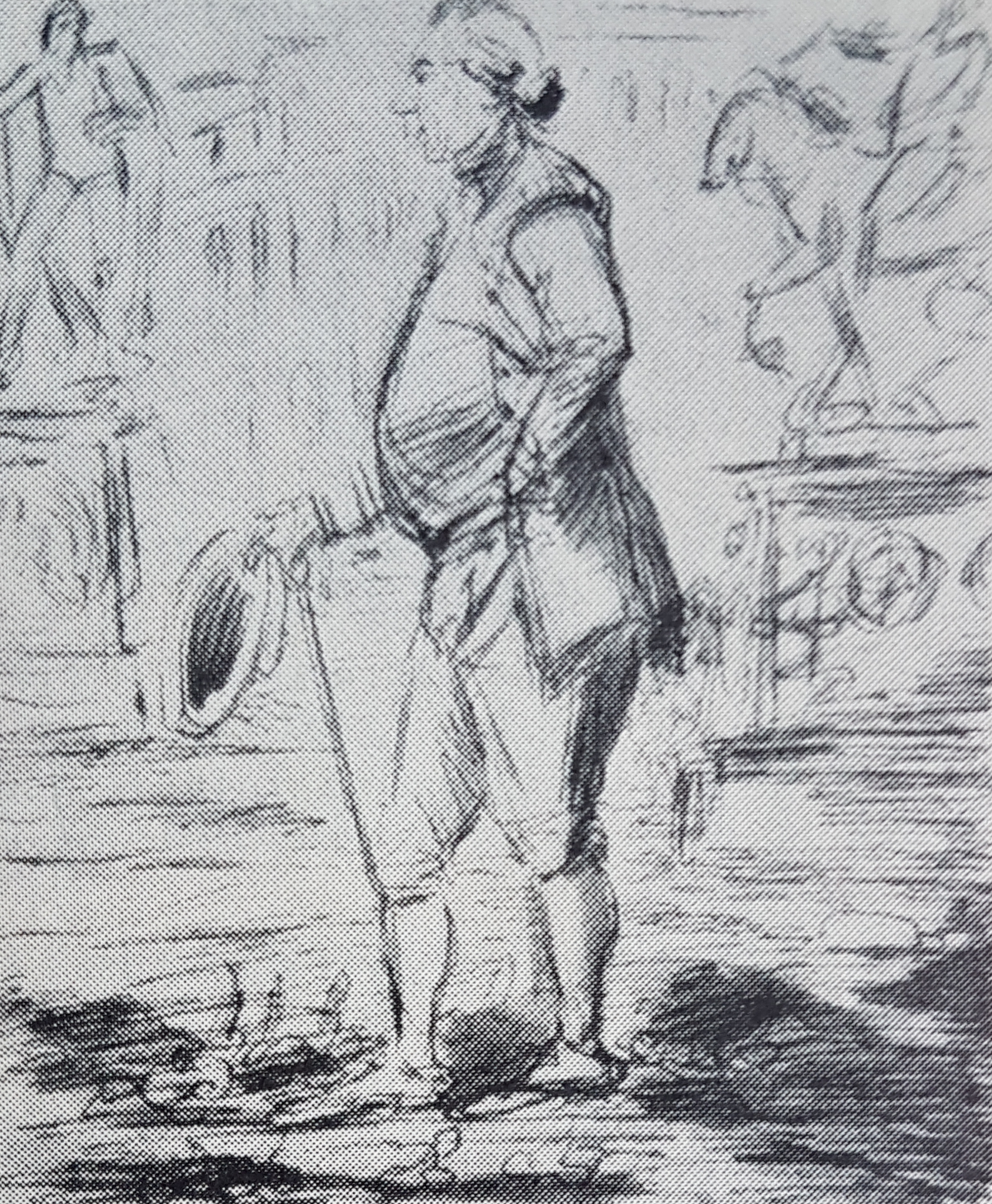
PH L'Archevêque between his statues drawn by JT Sergel, photographed portrait image from Allhem's Swedish Artists Lexicon.

Pierre Hubert L'Archevêque (May 1, 1721 – September 25, 1778) was a Swedish sculptor and director of the Swedish Academy of the Arts 1768–77. L'Archevêque was a disciple of Edmé Bouchardon in Paris, and served as a royal fellow in 1744 to Rome's sculpture academy. After five years of residence, he returned to Paris, where he received several assignments. In 1755 he moved to Stockholm, Sweden to be the royal chief statue. For the county hall at the castle of Stockholm, he made at least four of the seven allegorical statues (righteousness, caution, faithfulness and religion). He also created several portraits, including Jonas Alströmer, Olof von Dalin and Anders Plomgren, a grave monument over Gustaf von Seth in the Church of Byarum, and participated in the adornment of King Adolf Fredriks bisetting and funeral.

He was promoted to the director of the Painting and Sculpture Academy in Stockholm, and became an associate at the painting academy in Paris. He was elected in 1768 as a foreign member number 62 of the Royal Academy of Sciences. L'Archevêque is represented at, among others, Gothenburg Art Museum and The National Museum in Stockholm.
