= Risberget =

Risberget may refer to the following places:

- Risberget, Grue, a village in Grue Municipality in Innlandet county, Norway
- Risberget, Våler, a village the Våler Municipality in Innlandet county, Norway
- Risberget Chapel, a chapel in Våler Municipality in Innlandet county, Norway
