= Åsnes og Våler Municipality =

Former municipality in Hedmark, Norway

Åsnes og Våler Municipality Åsnes og Våler herred Aasnes og Vaaler herred
- Former municipality
- Hedmark within Norway

- Åsnes og Våler within Hedmark
- Coordinates: 60°38′2.91″N 11°54′42.93″E
- Country: Norway
- County: Hedmark
- District: Østerdalen
- Established: 1849
  - Preceded by: Hof Municipality
- Disestablished: 1854
  - Succeeded by: Åsnes and Våler Municipality
- Administrative centre: Flisa

Area (upon dissolution)
  - Total: 1,342 km^{2} (518 sq mi)
- Highest elevation: 705.51 m (2,314.7 ft)

Population (1854)
  - Total: 7,087
  - Density: 5.281/km^{2} (13.68/sq mi)
- Demonym(s): Åsnessokning; Vålsokning
- Time zone: UTC+01:00 (CET)
  - Summer (DST): UTC+02:00 (CEST)
- ISO 3166 code: NO-0425

Åsnes og Våler or Aasnes og Vaaler is a former municipality in the old Hedmark county, Norway. The 1,342-square-kilometre (518 sq mi) municipality existed from 1849 until its dissolution in 1854. The area is now divided between Åsnes Municipality and Våler Municipality in the traditional district of Solør. The administrative centre was the village of Flisa, where Åsnes Church is located.

== General information ==
The municipality of Aasnes og Vaaler was established in 1849 when the large Hof Municipality was divided into two parts (see formannskapsdistrikt law). Initially, Aasnes og Vaaler had a population of 7,087. In 1854, the municipality was divided to create two new municipalities: Aasnes Municipality (population: 3,677) in the south and Vaaler Municipality (population: 3,410) in the north. Both municipalities still exist, but the spelling of the names are slightly different (Åsnes and Våler).

=== Name ===
The municipal name was created in 1849 (and in use until 1854) when the old Hof Municipality was divided. The new name was a combination of two areas that made up the new municipality. The word og, meaning "and", was in between the two names. The name of the municipality was always spelled Aasnes og Vaaler during its existence, but on 21 December 1917, a royal resolution enacted the 1917 Norwegian language reforms (long after this municipality was dissolved). This reform changed the spelling in the Norwegian language so that the digraph "aa" was no longer used and instead, the letter å was used. This is why the name is now usually seen written using the modern spelling: Åsnes og Våler, but this was never used during the existence of the municipality.

The first name comes from the old Aasnes farm (Old Norse: Ásnes) since the first Åsnes Church was built there. The first element is áss which means "mountain ridge". The last element is nes which means "headland". The headland that it is referring to is made by the river Glomma near the Åsnes farm which is located beneath a hill. The second name comes from the old Vaaler farm (Old Norse: Válir) since the first Våler Church was built there. The first element is the plural form of váll which means "clearing in the woods".

=== Churches ===
The Church of Norway had two parishes (sokn) within Aasnes og Vaaler Municipality. At the time of the municipal dissolution, it was part of the Aasnes prestegjeld and the Sør-Østerdal prosti (deanery) in the Diocese of Hamar.

Churches in Aasnes og Vaaler
Parish (sokn)	Church name	Location of the church	Year built
Aasnes	Åsnes Church	Flisa	1744
Vaaler	Våler Church	Våler	1806*
*Note: This church burned down in 2009 and was rebuilt.

== Geography ==
The municipality was located in the Solør district. Elverum Municipality was to the north, the Älvdal Hundred in Sweden was to the east, Hof Municipality was to the south, Romedal Municipality was to the west, and Løten Municipality was to the northwest. The highest point in the municipality was the 705.51-metre (2,314.7 ft) tall mountain Kjølberget, located near the border with Trysil Municipality and Sweden.

== Government ==
While it existed, Aasnes og Vaaler Municipality was governed by a municipal council of directly elected representatives (Norwegian: herredsstyre). The mayor (Norwegian: ordfører) was indirectly elected by a vote of the municipal council.

== See also ==
- List of former municipalities of Norway
