= Haslemoen Airstrip =

- IATA: none; ICAO: none

Summary
- Airport type: Private
- Owner: Våler Municipality
- Operator: Solungen Mikroflyklubb
- Serves: Våler, Norway
- Location: Haslemoen, Våler
- Elevation AMSL: 175 m / 575 ft
- Coordinates: 60.6543°N 011.9105°E

Map
- Location in Norway

Runways
Direction	Length		Surface
Direction	m	ft	Surface
~~17/35~~	~~1,800~~	~~5,910~~	~~Concrete~~
16/34	585	1,919	Grass

Haslemoen Airstrip (Norwegian: Haslemoen flyplass) is a recreational airfield situated at Haslemoen in the village of Våler in Våler Municipality in Innlandet county, Norway. Since 2003 the aerodrome only features a 585-meter (1,919 ft) grass runway used mostly by ultralight aircraft and general aviation aircraft. This is located next to a closed 1,800-meter (5,900 ft) formerly military runway.

The field was planned by the Norwegian Army Air Service as a main air station during the late 1930s, but the plans were stopped by the outbreak of the Second World War. Haslemoen was built as a labor camp in 1943 and then taken over by Luftwaffe, who built the airport. Opening in August 1944, its main purpose was to station a squadron of Focke-Wulf Fw 200 Condors. Haslemoen was rebuilt and opened as the base of the Artillery Battalion in 1955. Operations resumed in 1960 with the delivery of Cessna O-1 Bird Dog observation aircraft. They remained in service with the artillery until 1992. The grass ultralight runway was established in 1990 and was sold to Våler Municipality in 2007.

== History ==
The interest to establish an airfield and military base at Haslemoen was first articulated by the Norwegian Army Air Service in the late 1930s. Their two main air stations in Eastern Norway, Kjeller and Gardermoen, were both too small. They therefore proposed that the relatively flat, forested areas at Haslemoen would be a suitable site for a main air station. Grants to expropriate 5.7 square kilometers (2.2 sq mi) was granted by Parliament in February 1940. Clearing of 2.0 square kilometers (0.77 sq mi) was completed by April. A planned meeting om 9 April concerning further construction was, however, interrupted by the German invasion.

Haslemoen was built in 1943 as a camp for conscripted labor services, serving in the Våler area. Haslemoen served in this capacity until the end of the year, when it was taken over by Luftwaffe. They were concerned about an attack on Norway and wanted to establish a reserve air base for Gardermoen, located far from the coast. Construction began in late 1943. Originally the airport was proposed to also have a water airport on the lake Gjesåssjøen, using water during summer and the ice and runway during winter.

The airfield was taken into use in late 1944, although minor works continued until the end of the war in May 1945. Both a runway, measuring 1,800 by 60 meters (5,910 by 200 ft), and a taxiway were built, along with auxiliary buildings, barracks, hangars, storehouses and workshops. The concrete for the runway was of poor quality and caused problems with frost heaving.

The airport saw little action during the remainder of the Second World War, after its opening in August 1944. From 21 November it served as a base for a squadron of the remaining Focke-Wulf Fw 200 Condors in Norway, reaching 28 aircraft by 28 December. Thereafter their numbers dwindled as they were transferred to the Continent. The squadron was disbanded on 7 March 1945, by which time only two Condors remained in Norway. Haslemoen was also home to a target tug squadron.

The aerodrome was taken over by the Royal Norwegian Air Force after the war ended on 8 May 1945. Initially Haslemoen was used as a transit camp for German soldiers before being repatriated. RNoAF allocated Haslemoen to a light bomber squadron, which was to be operated on a repetition- and mobilization basis. Soon the air force decided to re-prioritize its fleet procurement, and by 1948 it was clear that Haslemoen would not be used as an air station.

Haslemoen Base was, however, rebuilt for the Artillery Battalion and opened on 24 April 1955. The Air Force took delivery of the Cessna O-1 Bird Dog in 1960, and those allocated to Southern Norway were stationed at Haslemoen. These were used for aerial observations to support the artillery. They remained in service until 1992.

A government commission considered Haslemoen in 1988 as a potential main air station for Eastern Norway. Although there was ample space available and the area relatively flat, the airport was cut early in the process. The main concern was that its proximity to Sweden meant that operations would cause problems for the self-imposed no-fly zone for allied aircraft. The runway needed to be shifted 150 meters (490 ft) east, meaning that little of the existing infrastructure could be used.

Solungen Mikroflyklubb was established in 1990. In cooperation with the military it built a parallel, 500-meter (1,600 ft) grass runway to the east of the concrete runway. A second proposal for a Haslemoen Air Base came in 1992, during the retirement of the Bird Dogs: the Air Force proposed replacing the observation services with helicopters. While the Army preferred basing them with the artillery at Haslemoen, the Air Force preferred basing them at either Rygge Air Station or Bardufoss Air Station. In the end no replacement aircraft were bought for the Bird Dogs.

The artillery was moved to Rena Base in 2003 and Haslemoen subsequently closed. The 18-square-kilometer (7 sq mi) property was bought by Våler Municipality for 46 million Norwegian krone in 2007. The military abandonment saw the airport facilities being used for motor sports. The pinnacle was hosting 2007 Rally Norway. The municipality changed the focus away from motor sports and instead initiated a program to cultivate 6 square kilometers (2.3 sq mi) of the former base, including the airfield area.

== Facilities ==
In its military days, the air base boasted a concrete runway measuring 1,800 by 60 meters (5,910 by 200 ft). It also had a series of taxiways and aircraft shelters for a squadron of aircraft. This included taxiways to the shelters and also a parallel taxiway located west of the runway. The control tower was situated between the runway and parallel taxiway. The workshop and communications centre were located close to the garrison, west of the aerodrome.

The current runway consists of a grass cover measuring 585 by 15 meters (1,919 by 49 ft). It is used by ultralight and general aviation aircraft and is operated by Solungen Mikroflyklubb.

== Bibliography ==
- Arheim, Tom; Hafsten, Bjørn; Olsen, Bjørn; Thuve, Sverre (1994). Fra Spitfire til F-16: Luftforsvaret 50 år 1944–1994 (in Norwegian). Oslo: Sem & Stenersen. ISBN 82-7046-068-0.
- Gamst, Thorbein (1998). Befalsskolen for Feltartilleriet 1931–1996 (in Norwegian). Oslo: Artilleriregimentet og Artilleriets offisersforening. ISBN 8299465206.
- Hafsten, Bjørn; Larsstuvold, Ulf; Olsen, Bjørn; Stenersen, Sten (1991). Flyalarm: Luftkrigen over Norge 1939–1945 (in Norwegian). Oslo: Sem & Stenersen. ISBN 82-7046-058-3.
- Ministry of Defence (1988). Innstilling fra Jagerflyplassutvalget (in Norwegian). Oslo.
