= Braskereidfoss =

Village in Våler Municipality, Innlandet, Norway

- Village
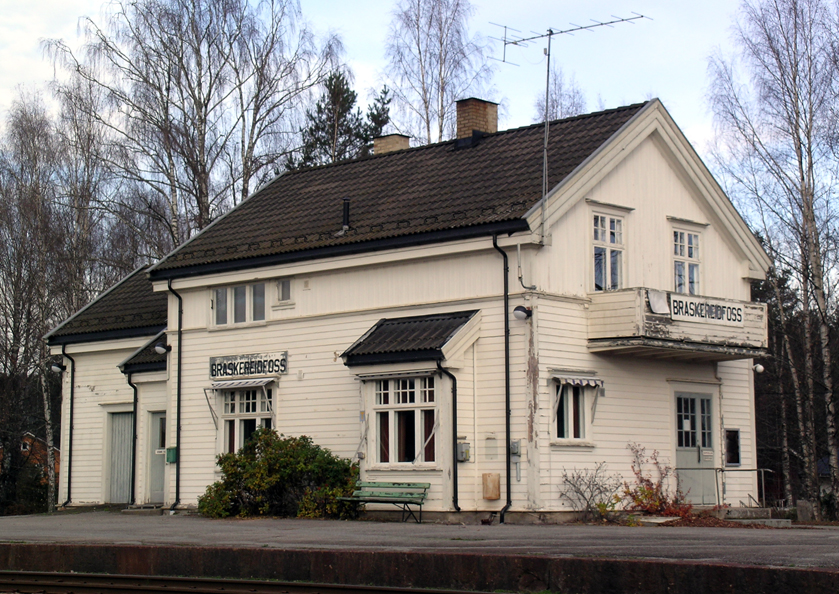
- Braskereidfoss train station
- Interactive map of Braskereidfoss
- Location within Innlandet Location within Norway
- Coordinates: 60.7247°N 11.80197°E
- Country: Norway
- Region: Eastern Norway
- County: Innlandet
- District: Solør
- Municipality: Våler Municipality

Area
  - Total: 1.61 km^{2} (0.62 sq mi)
- Elevation: 181 m (594 ft)

Population (2024)
  - Total: 249
  - Density: 155/km^{2} (400/sq mi)
- Time zone: UTC+01:00 (CET)
  - Summer (DST): UTC+02:00 (CEST)
- Post Code: 2435 Braskereidfoss

Braskereidfoss is a village in Våler Municipality in Innlandet county, Norway. The village is located along the river Glomma, about 6 kilometres (3.7 mi) north of the village of Våler. The Norwegian National Road 2 and the Solørbanen railway line both run through the village.

The 1.61-square-kilometre (400-acre) village has a population (2024) of 249 and a population density of 155 inhabitants per square kilometre (400/sq mi).

Braskereidfoss Station lies along the Solørbanen railway line which is currently a freight-only railway line since 1994. This is the only operating station between Elverum Station in Elverum at the north end of the line and Kongsvinger Station in Kongsvinger at south end. This station is primarily used for the on-loading of lumber, used by the local forestry industry.

The village is also close to an hydroeelectric generation dam, Braskereidfoss powerstation situated on the nearby Glomma river. The dam suffered a catastrophic failure during heavy rains and flooding in August 2023.

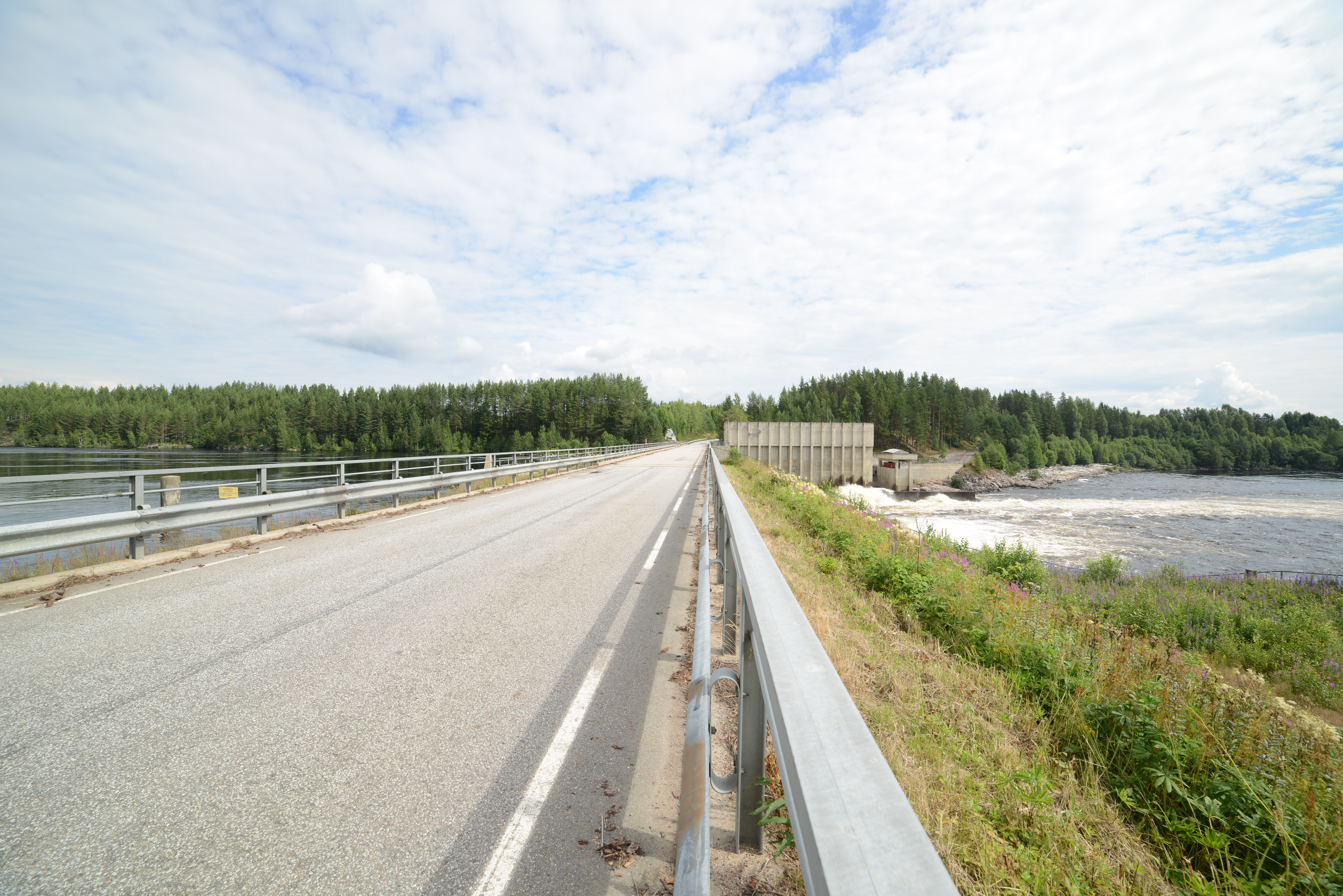
The dam before the breach

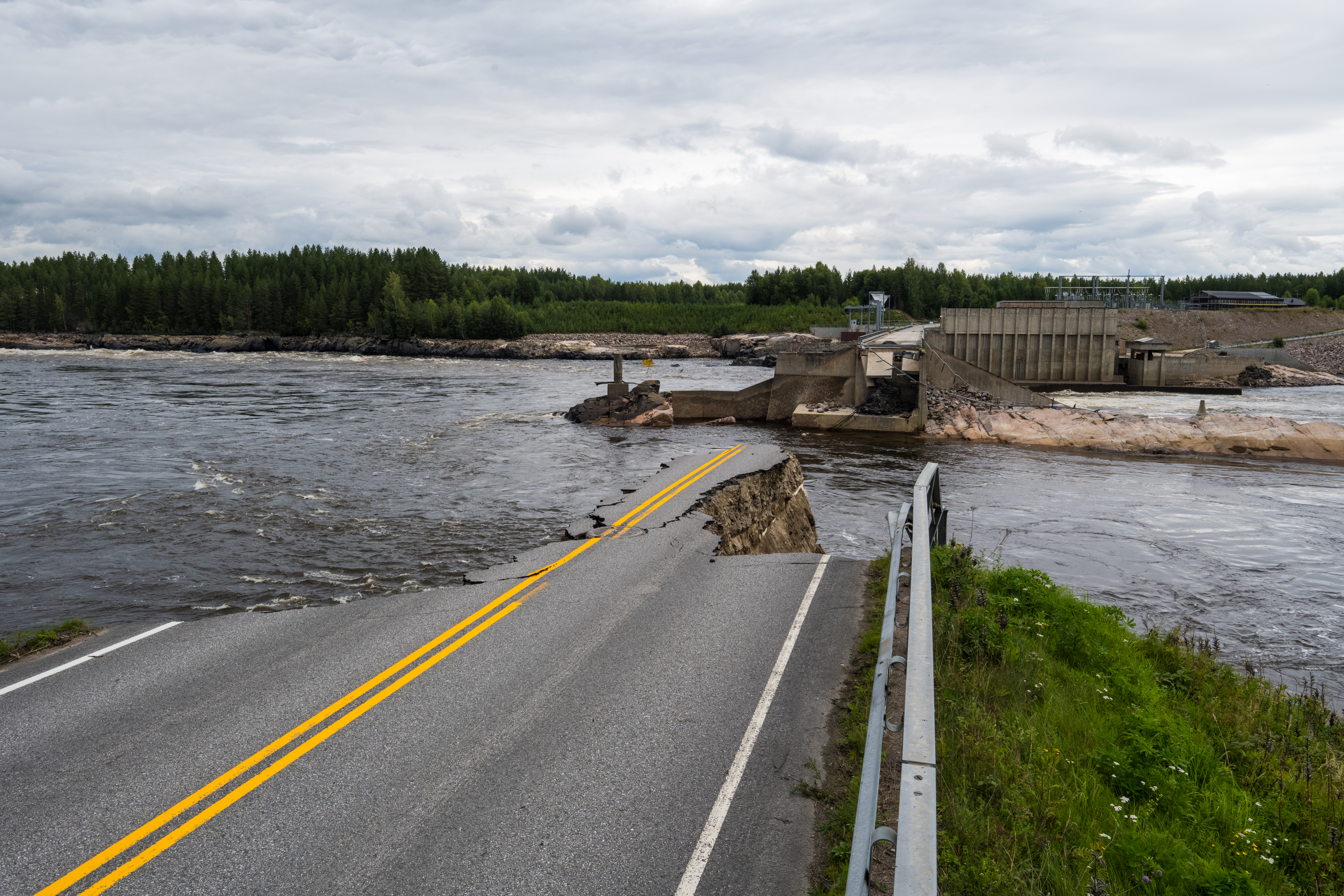
The dam after the breach
