= Johannes Skraastad =

Norwegian artist

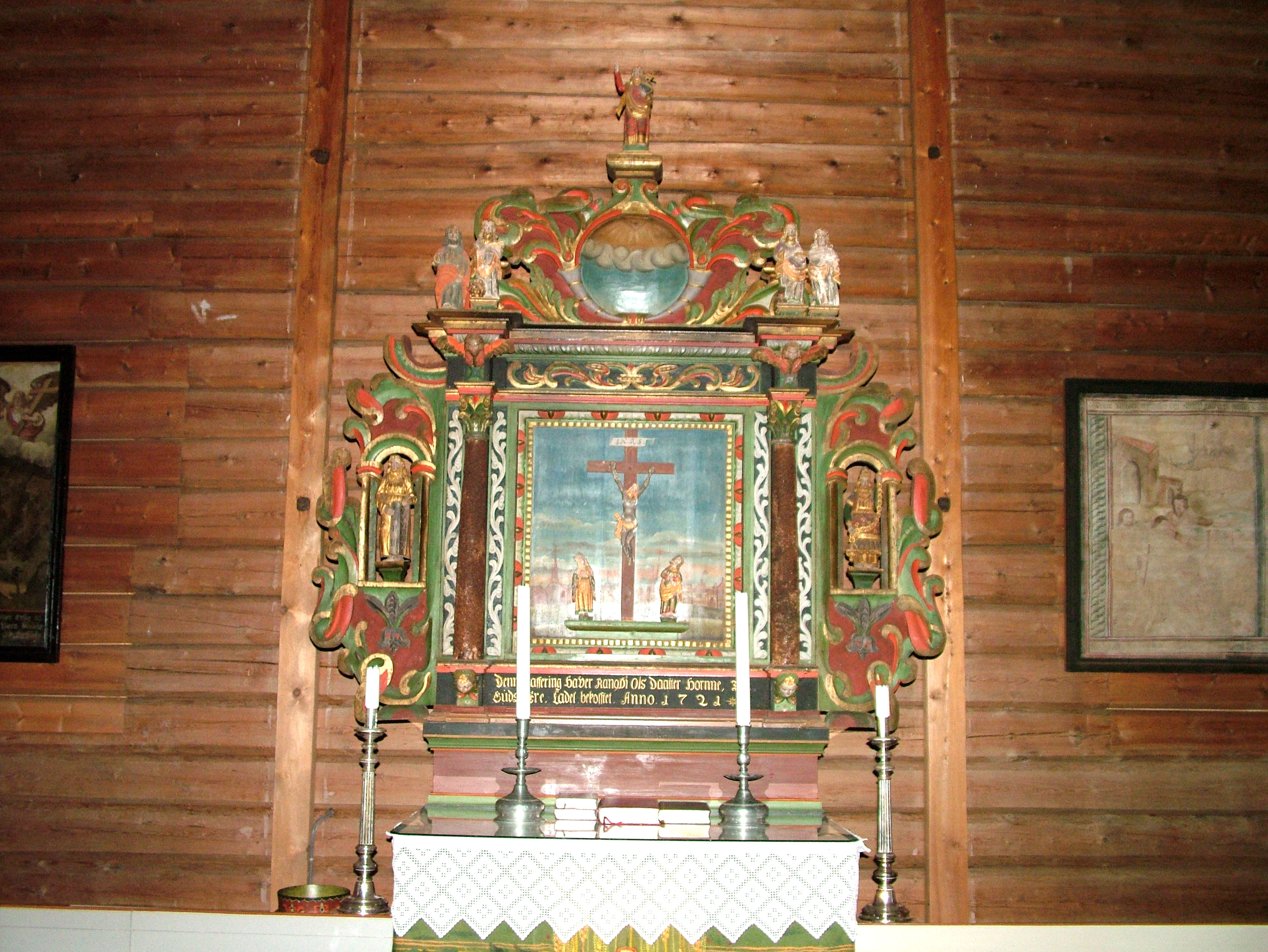
Christ on the cross between Mary and John altarpiece by Johannes Skraastad, Vallset church, 1686

Johannes Skraastad (1648–1700) was a Norwegian artist from Vang. He carved a number of well-known altar pieces and pulpits, many of which can still be seen today. Skraastad is best known for carving the altar pieces in Våler Church, Øvre Rendal Church, Folldal Church, Elverum Church, Veldre Church, Tomter Church, and Hof Church as well as the pulpit at Romedal Church.
