= Haslemoen =

Former military base in Våler, Innlandet, Norway

Coordinates: 60.651°N 11.871°E

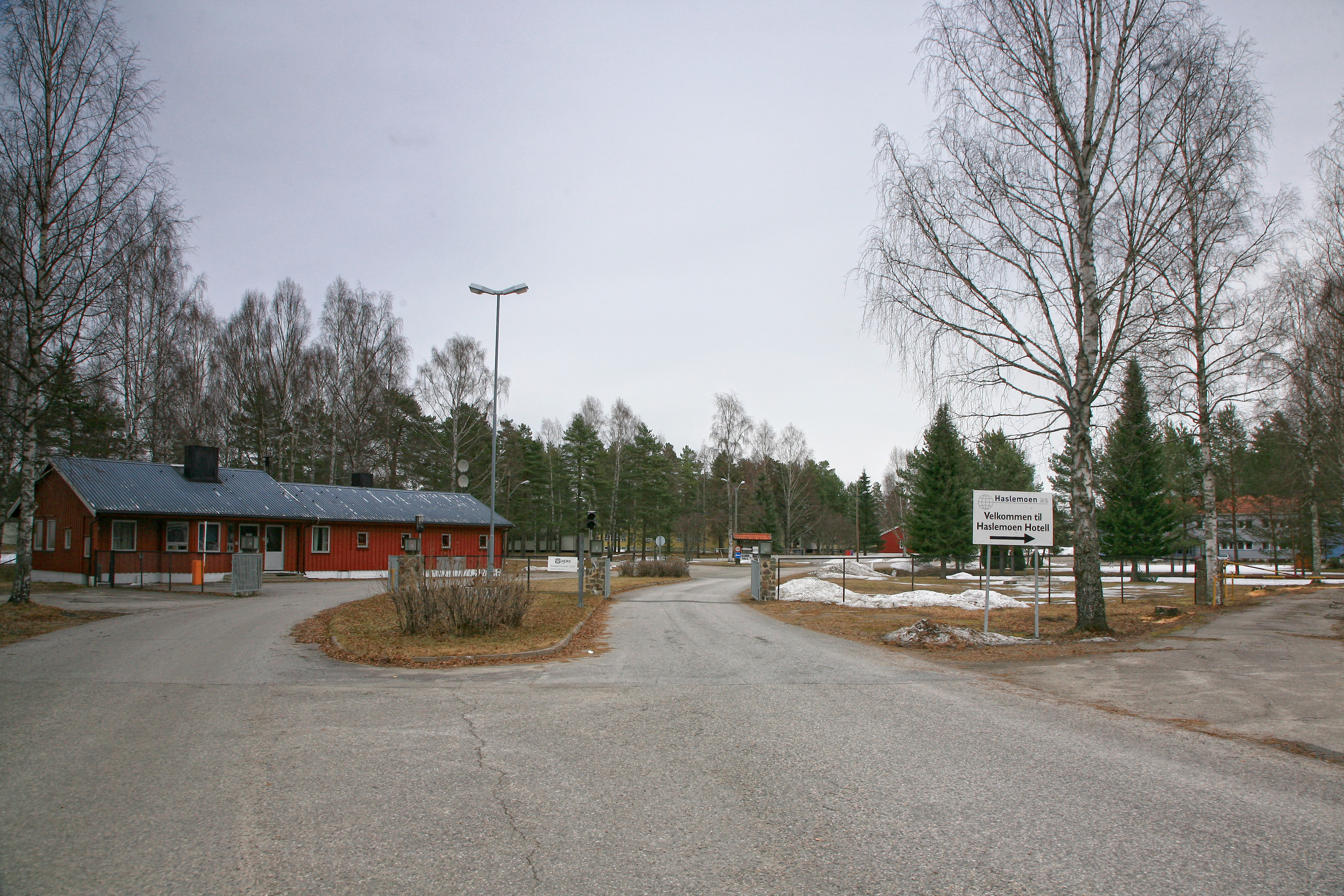
Entrance

Haslemoen is a former military base situated in the village of Våler which lies in Våler Municipality in Innlandet county, Norway. It was a military base from 1943 until its closure in 2003. It is also the site of Haslemoen Airstrip. It was also the site of Haslemoen Station, a stop along the Solørbanen railway line. Haslemoen is now used as a sporting center and it has been partially transformed into farmland. It also hosts a transit base for asylum seekers.

== History ==
The interest to establish an airfield and military base at Haslemoen was first articulated by the Norwegian Army Air Service in the late 1930s. Their two main air stations in Eastern Norway, Kjeller and Gardermoen, were both too small. They therefore proposed that the relatively flat, forested areas at Haslemoen would be a suitable site for a main air station. Grants to expropriate 5.7 square kilometers (2.2 sq mi) was granted by Parliament in February 1940. Clearing of 2.0 square kilometers (0.77 sq mi) was completed by April. A planned meeting on 9 April concerning further construction was, however, interrupted by the German invasion.

Haslemoen was built in 1943 as a camp for conscripted labor services, serving in the Våler area. Haslemoen served in this capacity until the end of the year, when it was taken over by Luftwaffe. The airfield was taken into use in late 1944, although minor works continued until the end of the war in May 1945. Both a runway, measuring 1,800 by 60 meters (5,910 by 200 ft), and a taxiway were built, along with auxiliary buildings, barracks, hangars, storehouses and workshops.

Haslemoen Base was rebuilt for the Artillery Battalion and opened on 24 April 1955. The base hosted the World Military Pentathlon Championship in 1964.

The artillery was moved to Rena Base in 2003 and Haslemoen subsequently closed. The 18-square-kilometer (7 sq mi) property was bought by Våler Municipality for 46 million Norwegian krone in 2007. The military abandonment saw the aeronautic facilities being used for motor sports. The pinnacle was hosting 2007 Rally Norway. The municipality changed the focus away from motor sports and instead initiated a program to cultivate 6 square kilometers (2.3 sq mi) of the former base, including the airfield area.
