= Halvdan Aarsrud =

Norwegian politician

Halvdan Aarsrud (29 September 1878 – 25 July 1925) was a Norwegian bailiff and politician for the Labour Party.

He was born in Våler Municipality in Hedmark as a son of farmer and politician Hermann Hansen Aarsrud (1837–1927) and Amalie Lundeby (1849–1915). After finishing primary school and county school, he graduated from Jønsberg Agricultural School. In 1907, he settled as a farmer in Våler, first at the farm Nervåle and later at Sole. From 1918, he was also the bailiff of Våler; and he was the director of the local savings bank.

He was a member of the municipal council of Våler Municipality from 1913 to 1925, serving as mayor from 1913 to 1918. He was also a member of the school board and county roads committee. He chaired the constituency branch of the Labour Party in Solør. In the 1915 parliamentary election he was fielded as the running mate of Labour's candidate Ivar Hvamstad, and with 3,679 votes Hvamstad edged out the closest challenger, Liberal Per Aasness with a wide margin. Hvamstad assumed his parliamentary seat in early 1916, but died in May 1916, upon which point Aarsrud replaced him as an MP. Aarsrud then ran for re-election in 1918, now with A. G. Fjeldseth as his running mate, and with 3,952 votes he edged out Aasness as the closest challenger who tallied 1,637 votes. Aarsrud served through 1921 as a member of the Standing Committee on Forestry and Water Resources. From 1920 to 1923, he was a deputy board member of the Norwegian Water Resources and Energy Agency. He died in July 1925.
