= John Eggen =

Norwegian politician

John Eggen (15 June 1885 – 6 January 1966) was a Norwegian politician for the Labour Party.

He was born at Eggen in Elverum Municipality as a son of smallholders. After finishing primary education, he worked as a forest and construction worker until 1915, then as a supervisor in the Norwegian Public Roads Administration.

In 1925 he was elected to the executive committee of the municipal council for Våler Municipality. He served as mayor from 1931 to 1940, when he was removed during the occupation of Norway by Nazi Germany. He also lost his place as chairman of the school board, which he had become in 1931. From 1945 to 1947, he was again an executive committee member. He served as a deputy representative to the Parliament of Norway from Hedmark during the term 1931–1933. He met in the place of Olav Sæter in parliamentary session in April 1932 and May 1933. In January 1966, Eggen was fatally hit by car in Våler.
