= Gravberget Church =

Church in Innlandet, Norway

- Gravberget kirke
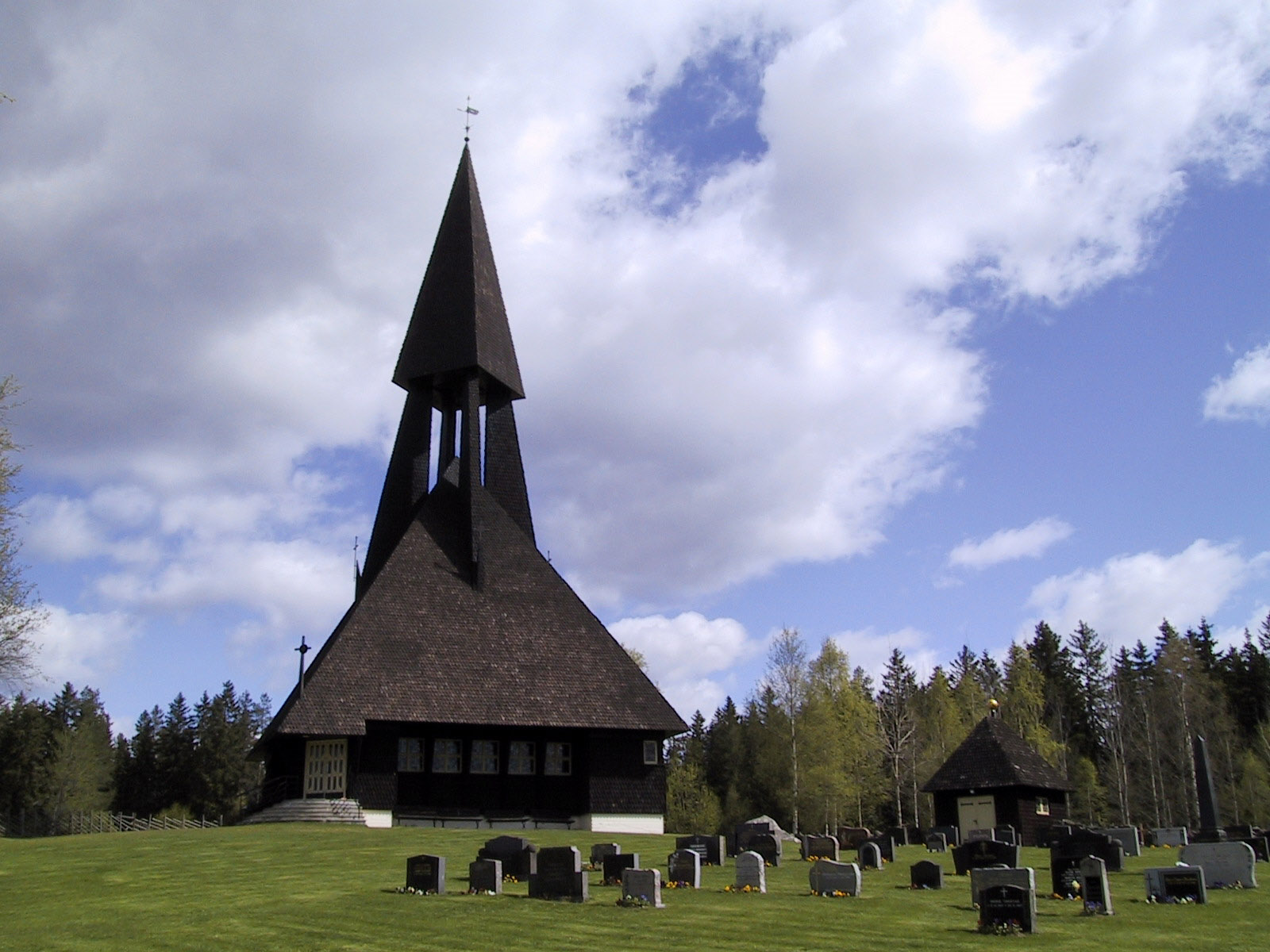
- View of the church
- Gravberget Church
- 60°52′44″N 12°14′43″E
- Location: Våler Municipality, Innlandet
- Country: Norway
- Denomination: Church of Norway
- Churchmanship: Evangelical Lutheran

History
- Status: Parish church
- Founded: 1955
- Consecrated: 30 October 1955

Architecture
- Functional status: Active
- Architect: Magnus Poulsson
- Architectural type: Fan-shaped
- Completed: 1955 (71 years ago)

Specifications
- Capacity: 150
- Materials: Wood

Administration
- Diocese: Hamar bispedømme
- Deanery: Solør, Vinger og Odal prosti
- Parish: Gravberget
- Norwegian Cultural Heritage Site
- Type: Church
- Status: Protected
- ID: 84411

Gravberget Church (Norwegian: Gravberget kirke) is a parish church of the Church of Norway in Våler Municipality in Innlandet county, Norway. It is located in the village of Gravberget. It is the church for the Gravberget parish which is part of the Solør, Vinger og Odal prosti (deanery) in the Diocese of Hamar. The brown, wooden church was built in a fan-shaped design in 1955 using plans drawn up by the architect Magnus Poulsson. The church seats about 150 people.

== History ==
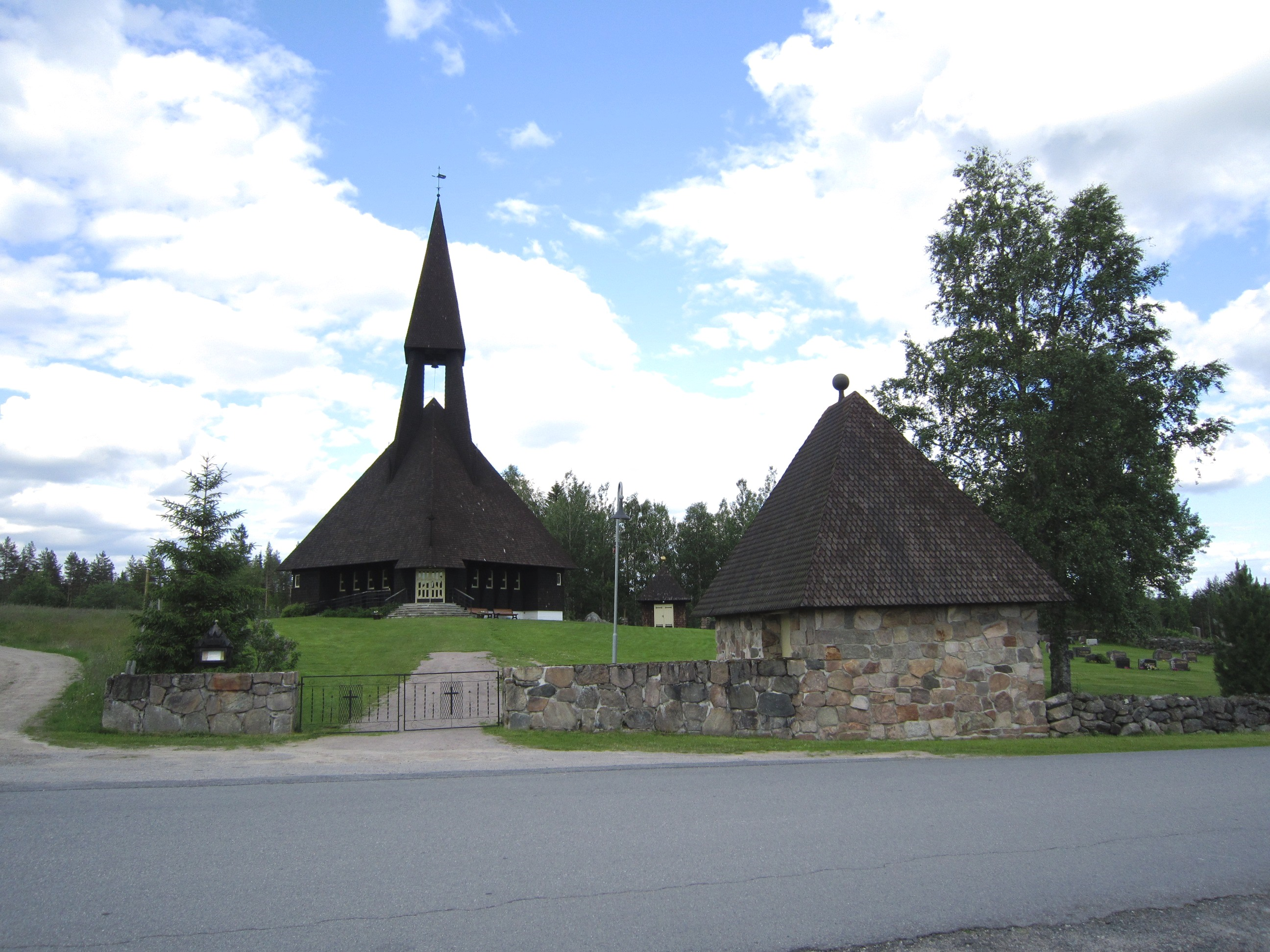
View of the church. Credit: Jan-Tore Egge

During the 1950s, the parish decided to build a church in the Finnskogen forest area in eastern Våler. In 1952, Magnus Poulsson was hired to design the new church. The church design is reminiscent of the shape of a spruce tree. The base is almost square, and the tower superstructure is pyramid-shaped. The tower above the roof is set diagonally in relation to the building itself. It thus becomes a pyramid diagonally above the pyramid. The church was built in 1955 and it was consecrated on 30 October 1955 by the Bishop Kristian Schjelderup.

== See also ==
- List of churches in Hamar
