= Hermann Hansen Aarsrud =

Norwegian politician

Hermann Hansen Aarsrud (14 July 1837 – 14 February 1927) was a Norwegian farmer and politician for the Liberal Party.

He was elected as a deputy representative to the Parliament of Norway from the constituency Hedemarkens Amt in 1888, and moved up as a regular representative following the 1890 death of Eivind Torp. He was re-elected in 1891, 1894 and 1897, serving through 1900. He was a farmer and merchant in Våler Municipality. He served as mayor of Våler Municipality from 1879 to 1904.

Together with Amalie Lundeby (1849–1915) he had the son Halvdan Aarsrud, who became a member of Parliament in 1916.
