= Solør Line =

Railway line in Innlandet, Norway

Coordinates: 60.6133°N 11.9544°E

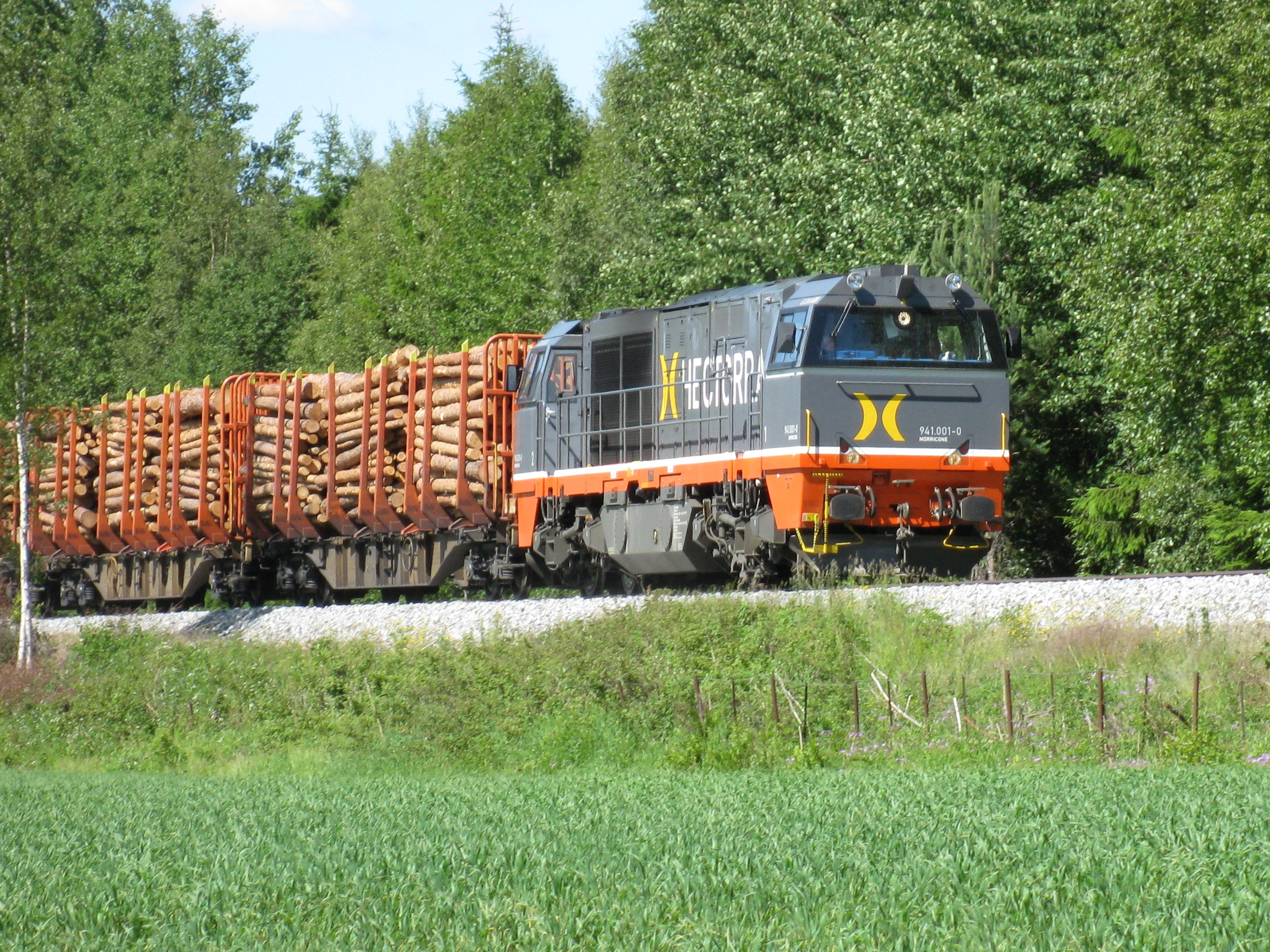
- Hector Rail Vossloh G2000 BB hauling a lumber train

Overview
- Native name: Solørbanen
- Owner: Norwegian National Rail Administration
- Termini: Kongsvinger Station; Elverum Station

Service
- Type: Railway
- System: Norwegian railway network
- Operator(s): Hector Rail; TÅGAB; TX Logistik

History
- Opened: 3 November 1893; 131 years ago (to Flisa); 4 December 1910; 114 years ago (to Elverum)

Technical
- Line length: 93.6 km (58.2 mi)
- Number of tracks: Single
- Character: Freight
- Track gauge: 1,435 mm (4 ft 8 1/2 in)
- Electrification: No
- Operating speed: 130 km/h (81 mph)
- Highest elevation: 187 m (614 ft) AMSL

The Solør Line (Norwegian: Solørbanen) is a 93.6-kilometer (58.2 mi) railway line that runs through district of Solør in Innlandet county, Norway. The line connects the Kongsvinger Line at Kongsvinger Station with the Røros Line at Elverum Station, running through the municipalities of Kongsvinger, Grue, Åsnes, Våler, and Elverum. The standard gauge line lacks electrification and centralized traffic control; it is solely used by freight trains, mostly hauling lumber and wood chippings.

Proposals for a railway through Solør were first launched in 1857, but was not approved until 1890. Work commenced the following year on the section from Kongsvinger to Flisa, opening on 3 November 1893. The section from Flisa Station to Elverum was approved in 1894, but a dispute concerning the route postponed construction for thirteen years. The northern section opened on 4 December 1910. The Solør Line had a major impact on the area, leading to industrialization. Communities such as Flisa, Kirkenær and Roverud grew rapidly because they received stations.

Diesel multiple units were introduced from the 1930s. Passenger services were reduced in 1963 and were finally abolished in 1994. The line received upgrades to its permanent way in 1964 and 1993, and three lumber terminals were opened in 1987. Since 2012 the line has seen a dramatic increase in lumber traffic. There are proposals to electrify and centralize traffic control along the line.

== Route ==
The 93.6-kilometer (58.2 mi) Solør Line connects the Kongsvinger Line at Kongsvinger Station to the Røros Line at Elverum Station. The line runs through the traditional district of Solør, through the municipalities of Kongsvinger, Grue, Åsnes, Våler and Elverum. The line predominantly runs along the east bank of the river Glomma, except the northernmost 7 kilometers (4.3 mi), which runs on the west bank. The Solør Line is, by Norwegian standards, exceptionally straight and flat. The line has single track and standard gauge, but is not electrified and lacks centralized traffic control and automatic train control. It is equipped with GSM-R train radio. The railway line is owned and maintained by the Norwegian National Rail Administration.

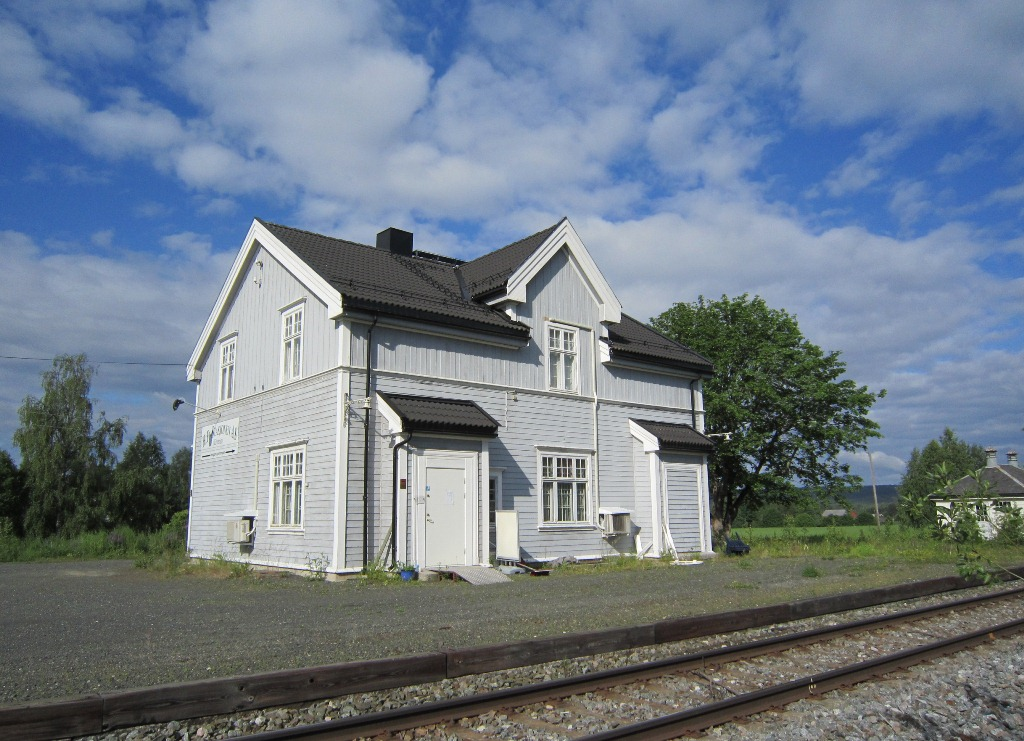
Heradsbygd Station is in the plainer style designed by Harald Kaas

The line branches off from the Kongsvinger Line at 100.28 kilometers (62.31 mi) from Oslo Central Station, at an elevation of 148 meters (486 ft) above mean sea level. Elverum Station, located 194.60 kilometers (120.92 mi) from Oslo, is at en elevation of 187 meters (614 ft). There are three passing loops, located at Kirkenær, Flisa and Braskereidfoss Stations. These are staffed when passing is necessary. There are three lumber terminals on the line, Norsenga, Braskereidfoss and Vestmo. The line is—for its era—built with a slack 400-meter (1,300 ft) minimum curve radius and a maximum gradient of 0.6 percent (1:154). The Solør Line can boast with the two longest straight sections of track in the country not located in tunnels. The longest is a 8,195-meter (26,886 ft) section at Namnå, followed by a 5,490-meter (18,010 ft) section at Grinder. Large parts of the line is rated for 130 kilometers per hour (81 mph). The line could, if it received centralized traffic control and all level crossings were removed, be rated for 160 kilometers per hour (99 mph) without further modification.

== History ==
=== Planning ===
The rationale for building a railway through Solør was first and foremost tied to the large lumber resources in the area, especially in Finnskogen. Engebret Soot proposed in 1851 that Glomma be connected to the Swedish canal network. It was mostly technical difficulties which resulted in the plans being shelved. Glomma would need to receive several parallel canals and locks. The river is iced half the year and there are shifting sandbanks. The interest for a railway arose with the construction of the Kongsvinger Line, approved in 1857 and completed in 1862.

A local planning committee was established in 1857 to look into the possibilities of a branch from the Kongsvinger Line to serve Solør. For a while a combined rail and canal project was considered, but eventually discarded. Work accelerated in 1869 when the municipal councils teamed up to support the project. Two years later Railway Director Carl Abraham Pihl led a survey group. Their work concluded in 1875, ending in a recommendation to build the line. Two route proposals were made, one across Gjelsåsen and one following Glomma. Parliament dismissed approving the line in 1877. By then the country had fallen into an economic decline and Parliament did not want to issue further funding to railways not already under construction.

A government commission came in 1882 with recommendations for future railway construction. They placed the Solør Line at the top of their priority list. In addition to it being perceived as having a good return on investment, the limited amount of funding available cautioned the commission to recommend trunk routes which would largely be futile unless completed to their intended termini. During this period there was a major controversy concerning rail gauge in Norway. Some lines were being built in standard gauge, others in narrow gauge. With the Kongsvinger Line being built in standard gauge, a deviating gauge in Solør with require transshipment. Pihl argued for narrow gauge, but standard gauge was ultimately chosen.

An 1886 plan discarded the Solør Line, instead wanting to focus on trunk lines. By 1888 the economy had begun to grow again and the Sverdrup's Cabinet therefore proposed that three new railways be built, including the first part of the Solør Line, from Kongsvinger to Flisa. The following year the Railway Committee of 1889 included the Solør Line with a high priority in its recommendation. Construction was approved by Parliament on 8 July 1890, with 91 against 20 votes.

=== Kongsvinger–Flisa ===
The line was built as a state railway by the Norwegian State Railways. As was common at the time, a local contribution was required, constituting 1 million Norwegian krone funded through an investment company with a broad public and private ownership. The line was built as Class II, or "light standard gauge", using 25 instead of 30 kilograms per meter (50 vs. 60 lb/yd) as on the Kongsvinger Line.

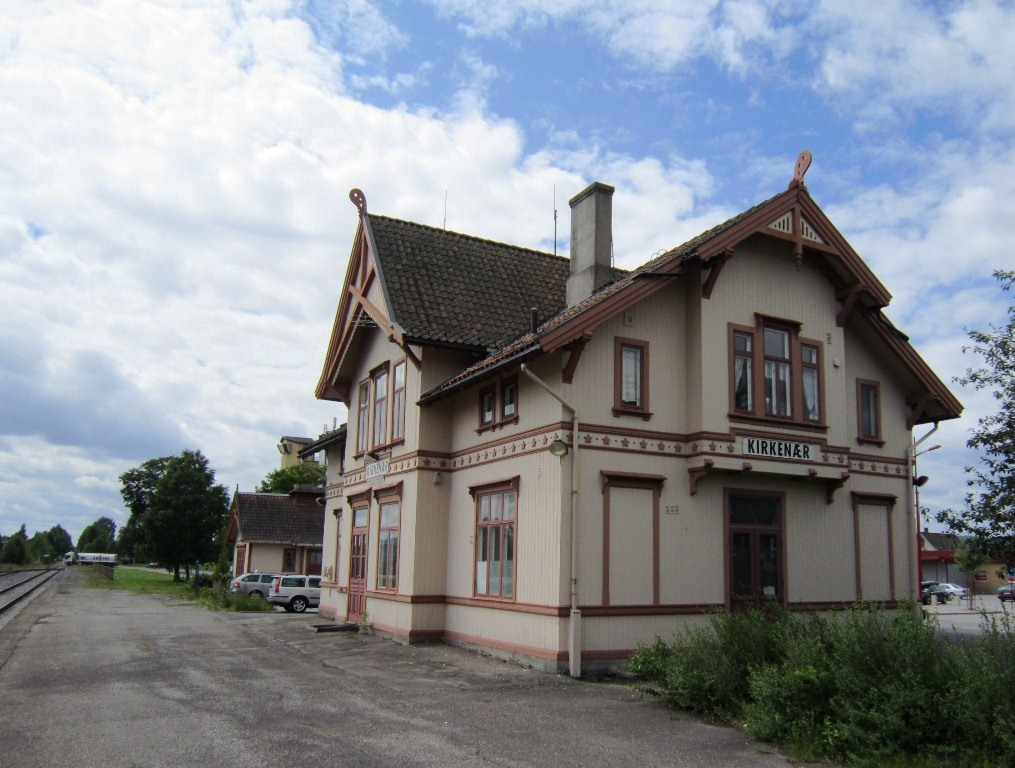
Kirkenær Station—designed in Swiss chalet style by Paul Due—has not seen passenger traffic since 1994, but remains staffed to operate the passing loop

Preliminary work was carried out through the latter part of 1890 and early 1891, while expropriation was conducted from August 1891 and the following months. Construction proper on the section from Kongsvinger to Flisa commenced on 16 September 1891, led by Alfred Kielland. The work was split in two sections. The southern subcontracted the groundwork to P. T. Melby and S. Sørensen, while the railway did this itself on the northern part. The permanent way was built by the railway for the entire line. The northern part was built below budget, while the latter matched it. The subcontracting was an experiment to see if savings could be made this way, but based on the experiences from the line, NSB abandoned the system.

Construction was quick, largely due to the flat landscape and the limited amount of bedrock which needed to be negotiated. There were only a few, short cuttings. There were ten bridges, of which the longest and most complicated was 66.7 meters (219 ft) and ran over Flisa, at the time the longest railway bridge span in the country. A further five overpasses, nine underpasses and 260 level crossings were built for roads. Construction of the station buildings was subcontracted to Johan Heinrich Günther Schüzler. Brandval was the only station to not receive a building.

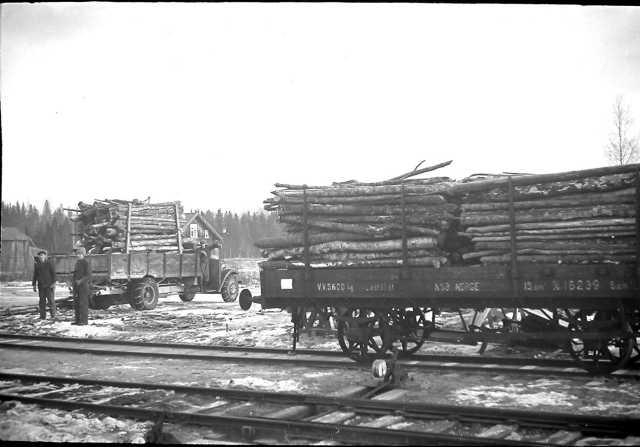
Lumber being loaded onto wagons at Roverud Station in 1947

The 49.2 kilometers (30.6 mi) from Kongsvinger to Flisa were officially opened on 1 November 1893, and regular services commenced two days later. Construction cost 2.9 million Norwegian krone. As long as the line ran to Flisa it served two daily train in each direction. Travel time was just short of two hours. Although popular for carrying passengers and cargo, the lumber industry was never an early adopter of timber trains, instead remaining loyal to log floating. Still, the railway was important for the commercial development in the area and supported the lumber industry through supplies.

With the railway came a stable, waged workforce, a segment which was quite limited previously. Work on the railways was popular and became a stabilizing force in the economy, as well as a good tax income for the municipalities. Manny of the navvies working on the construction settled in the area and became the foundation of the workforce used in the growing industrialization. The postal service was prior to the railway walked by foot either from Elverum or Kongsvinger, and the railway allowed for rapid communication. The railway were sufficient efficient that the steamships went out of business.

Flisa grew rapidly following the opening of the line, and soon had three hotels. It was soon the population and commercial center for all of Solør. With a major station at Kirkenær, the population and commercial center of Grue gradually moved from Tjura, with the administration center following suit. The least affected municipality was Hof, where the commercial and political center remained on the west shore of the river. Several places processing industries, especially wood-based, were established as the railway allowed for easy export of the products.

=== Flisa–Elverum ===
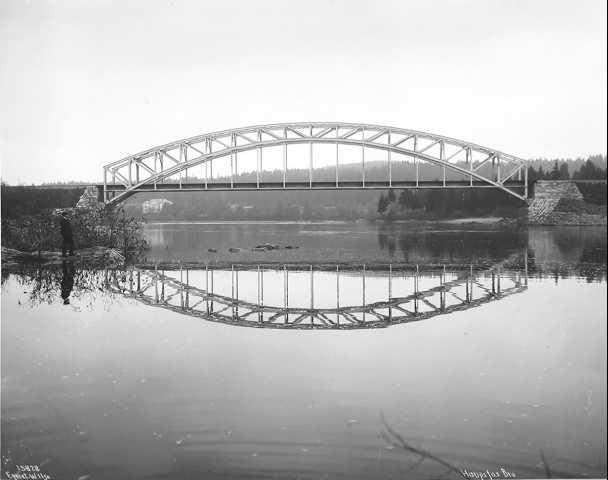
Haugsfoss Bridge had the longest span of any bridge in Norway when it was completed in 1910

Political work to extend the line to Elverum started even before the opening of the southern half, and was debated in Parliament in 1893. Railways were in the wind and there were many projects competing for political support. Initially only a minority was willing to support the line. Several trunk lines were being proposed, and there was political struggling for various parliamentarians to gather support for "their" line. This resulted in the Great Railway Compromise of 1894. The Solør Line was the most popular, receiving 105 against 5 votes on 1 March. The same day four other major railway lines were passed.

Although the line was passed, there was not agreement as to which route it should follow. From Flisa the line could continue along Glomma past Åsnes Church and Haslemoen to the village of Våler. Alternatively, the line could run further north through the parish of Gjesåsen. The Gjesåsen alternative was supported unanimously in Åsnes Municipal Council, while Våler Municipal Council unanimously supporter the river alternative. Hedmark County Council first supported the river and then the Gjesåsen alternative.

The route disagreement persisted for thirteen years, hindering the line from being built. It was not until a visit by the Standing Committee on Railways in 1907 that a decision was finally made in favor of the river alternative. They also decided to cross Glomma at Haugsfoss, discarding a military preference of a more southerly crossing of the river.

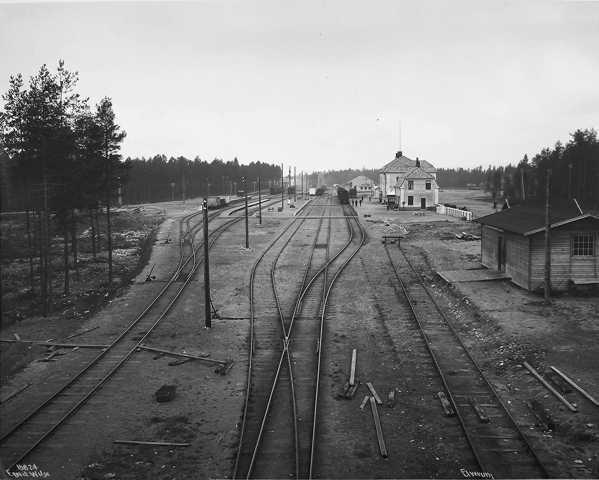
Elverum Station opened in 1913 and received a set of tracks each for standard and narrow gauge

Construction began on 20 January 1908 and was led by J. T. Mæhre. There were similar good building conditions, allowing for rapid construction. The line's only tunnel was built, as were six bridges. The two longest were built to cross Glomma. With a span of 84 meters (276 ft), Haugsfoss Bridge was the longest in the country at the time and work was subcontracted to a German company. Five stations were built. Construction cost NOK 2,869,750, giving the lowest kilometer price of any mainline railway ever built in Norway. The 44.4-kilometer (27.6 mi) segment was officially opened on 3 December 1910 and regular traffic commenced the following day. Work on a new station in Elverum did not commence until 1910, and the new station was opened on 1 May 1913. As the Rorøs Line was narrow gauge, Elverum Station featured break-of-gauge and a transshipment facility until 1919.

=== Operational history ===
Initially the line had three daily trains run from Elverum via Kongsvinger to Oslo, increasing to four after a few years. Travel time varied between departures, but was around three hours on the full line, calling at fifteen stations. Brandval Municipality was similar to other places effected by the new line. The station was placed at Roverud, while the village of Brandval was not given a station, despite the railway passing right by. The issue was resolved through Brandval Station being privately funded, opening on 22 January 1912.

The railway never made an operating profit and from the 1920s there have regularly been proposals to close the railway. These never gained widespread support, and instead there were numerous proposals for various branch lines. NSB conducted trials with multiple units in 1927, and they entered service a during the 1930s.

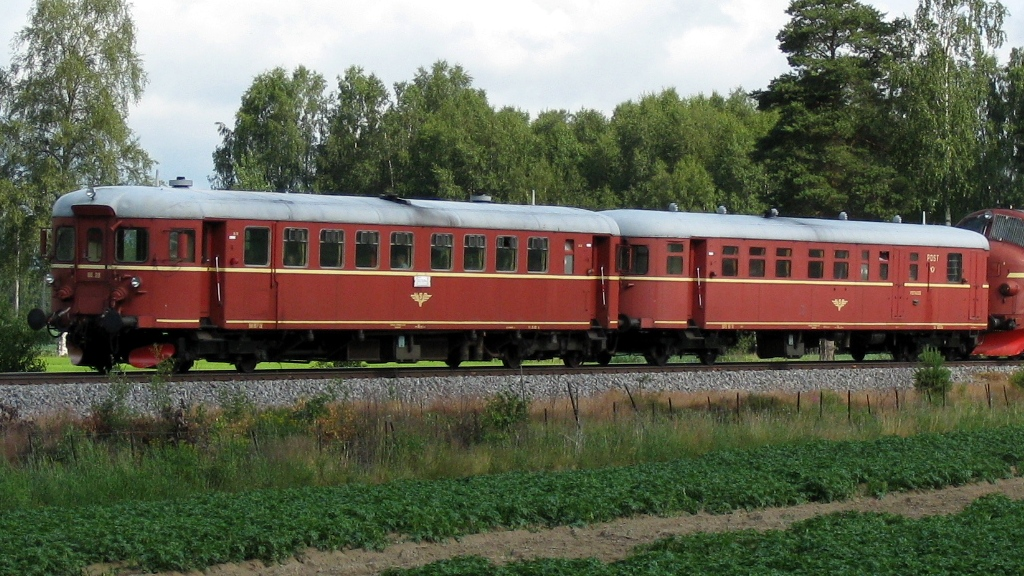
Heritage ride with an NSB Class 86 multiple unit. These trains were used for passenger transport from the 1930s and onwards

The bridges at Nor and Braskereidfoss were blasted during the German invasion of Norway in 1940, delaying the Wehrmacht from advancing northwards by rail. The country's energy needs throughout the Second World War switched to dependence on wood – large and frequent firewood trains were therefore sent from Solør to the capital area and the total freight traffic on the line tripled during the war.

The Kongsvinger Line was electrified in 1951, and there were proposals to quickly electrify the Solør Line, but these never materialized. The opening of a military base at Haslemoen in the 1950s had increased the patronage significantly and by 1961 it had 141,000 annual passengers, between thirteen daily services. From 1963 the number of passenger trains were decimated and instead bus services established. However, the road was of insufficient standard to allow the buses to operate without difficulties. The road was closed because of frost heaving every spring and three overpasses were too small for the buses. NSB retained three daily train services in each direction, using a single multiple unit.

Steam locomotives remained in regular use on freight trains until 1965 and were used sporadically until 1969. To allow for the heavier Di 3 diesel locomotives, the southern part of the line needed to be upgraded to the same standard as the northern. Sturdier 30 kilogram per meter (60 lb/yd) tracks were laid on top of an improved layer of ballast, allowing the line speed to increase from 65 to 95 kilometers per hour (40 to 59 mph). The work allowed NSB to capture a significant amount of the lumber transport after the forest industry terminated its log floating operations in the late 1960s.

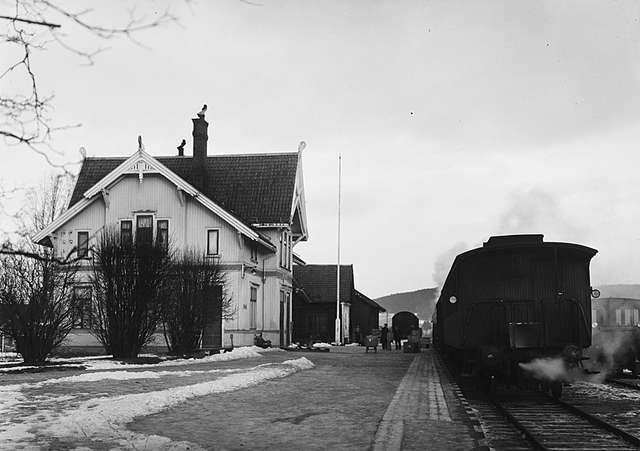
Steam train at Roverud Station in 1945

NSB again considered terminating passenger transport in 1972, leading to a major local political protest. The closing proposals died down, but returned in 1984. This resulted in a proposal to instead operate the long-distance trains between Trondheim and Oslo on the Røros Line via Solør instead of via Hamar. The sleek curvature would allow for high speeds, and the congestion of the Dovre Line could be cut. After considerable political discussion, Hedmark County Council approved a new bus service between Kongsvinger and Elverum and onwards to Hamar. Local train services were thereby terminated from 1 June 1986, the same day a daily day train and a daily night trains to run.

The service was a trade-off, as the longer distance via Solør added an hour to the travel time for passengers from Østerdalen. In exchange, people from Solør and Kongsvinger received a direct service to both Oslo and Trondheim. Passengers from Østerdalen used the train less, among other things because of the lack of a direct service to Hamar. After a three-year trial, the long-distance trains moved back to Hamar and two daily local services were reintroduced through Solør.

A break-through in the use as a lumber line came in 1987, when Borregaard decided to require all lumber to be sent by train or truck. NSB built three lumber terminals along the Solør Line, at Elverum, Brakereidfoss and at Kongsvinger, and started transporting 300,000 cubic meters (11,000,000 cu ft) of lumber the first year. This spurred a need for further upgrades to the line. NOK 110 million was invested in 1992 and 1993, involving the laying of concrete sleepers, 49-kilogram-per-meter (98 lb/yd) continuously welded rails and increasing the permitted axle load to 22.5 tonnes (22.1 long tons; 24.8 short tons). The final chapter for passenger trains took place on 29 August 1994, when all passenger train services were terminated.

Lumber traffic increased steadily through the 1990s and 2000s. A dramatic increase of export lumber took place after 2012, when three major pulp and paper mills were closed in rapid succession – Norske Skog Follum, Peterson Moss and Södra Cell Tofte. Nationally the amount transported by rail tripled in a few years, a large portion of which ran along the Solør Line.

== Operations ==
The Solør Line is exclusively used for freight trains. As of 2012 the line saw an average ten to eleven weekly southbound trainloads of lumber and wood choppings, although this number has since increased. These have their origins at various lumber terminals either along the Solør Line or along the Røros Line. There is also one train per week with northbound to Norske Skog Skogn. Due to the lack of electric traction the line is not used for intermodule trains.

The density of forest in Hedmark along both the Solør and Røros Lines is amongst the most productive in the country, and these lines see an unprecedented amount of lumber trains compared to elsewhere in the country. Norsenga Lumber Terminal has an annual loading of 536,546 tonnes of lumber in 2013, making it the busiest such terminal in Norway. It was followed by Vestmo, with 470,292 tonnes. Braskereidsfoss is the fifth-busiest, with 66,863 tonnes. Train operators include Hector Rail, TX Logistik and Tågåkeriet i Bergslagen. The largest customer is Stora Enso, which mostly imports the lumber for use at its plant in Karlstad, Sweden. Lesser quantities are transported to Gävle and Sundsvall.

== Architecture ==
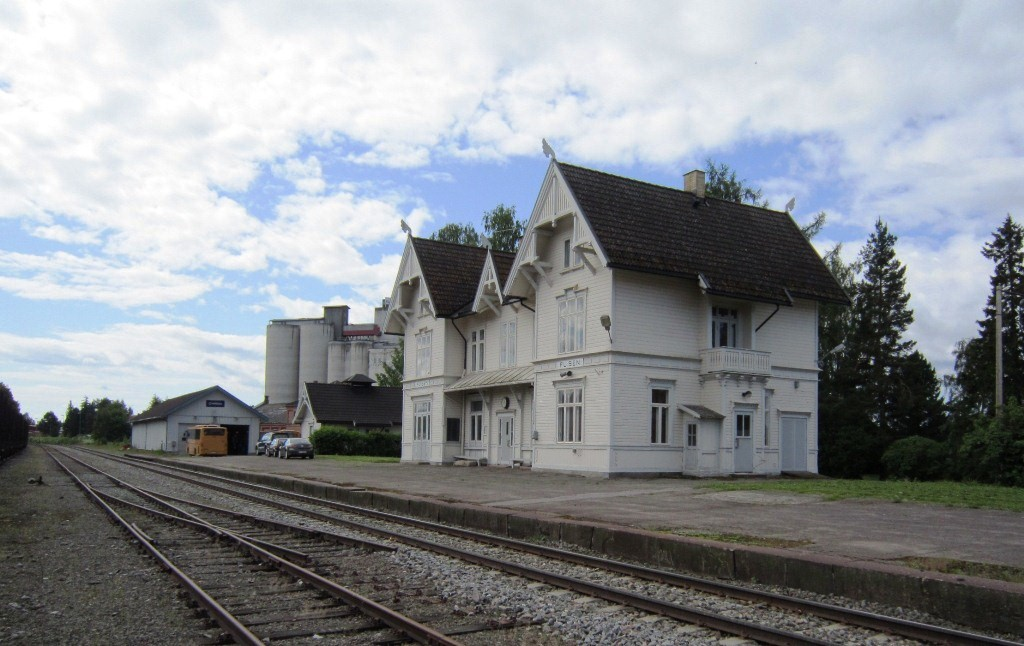
Flisa Station was the original terminus and thus the largest intermediate station on the line.

As the Kongsvinger–Flisa Line was the first railway built by NSB in over a decade, the design of the stations was granted to Paul Due as his début railway project. The stations were characterized by Swiss chalet style, although it was the first steps towards the larger popular Dragon Style. As the first line in Norway, the stations received a through waiting room. Because of the prominence of lumber traffic, each station was set up with the station building on the one side and a lumber terminal on the other. Each platform was 90 meters (300 ft) long, with the station building in the center and the outhouse and cargo house placed at each end. The latter was built in a dominant Dragon Style. The centerpiece was Flisa, the only first-class station. Kirkenær and Roverud were mid-sized second-class stations, and small, standardized third-class stations were built at Arneberg, Grinder, Namnå and Nor.

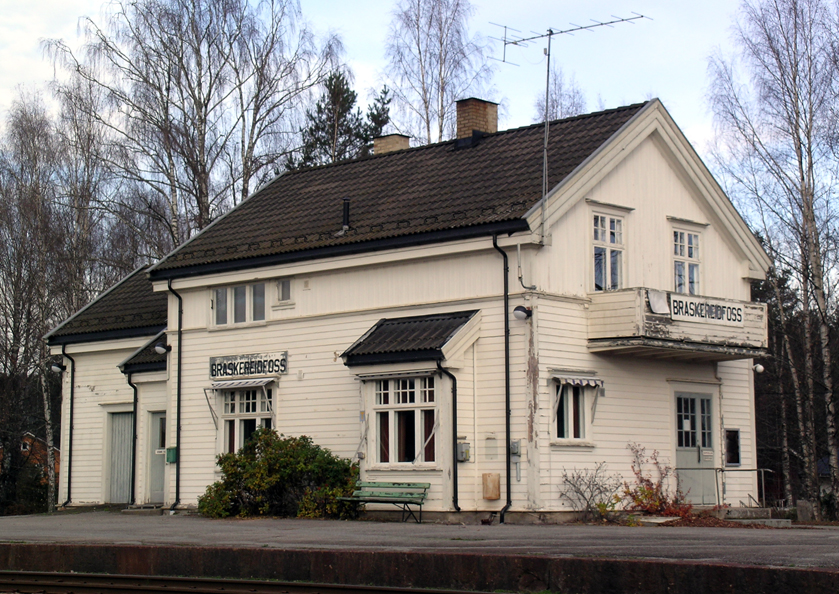
Braskereidfoss Station was a third-class station on the northern station. These stations were plainer than those built on the southern half.

By the time the Flisa–Elverum Line was built, the style preferences had changed. Harald Kaas was the head architect for the project, although Due designed Elverum Station. As it was a transfer station, a new stone building was built in Neo-baroque style with elements of Jugendstil. By the 1910s the Swiss style was too controversial to be reused and so the remaining buildings received a much plainer design. Second-class stations were built at Våler and Heradsbygd, while third-class stations were built at Braskereidfoss and Jømna.

Because of the limited traffic along the Solør Line, the stations have not been subject to repeated expansions and changes like many other lines. They therefore represent a unique heritage of authentic Swiss chalet style buildings from a period with heavy construction of railways. Roverud, Nor, Grinder, and Flisa have all been listed, as has the water tower at Jømna.

== Future ==
Two major developments have been proposed for the Solør Line – electrification and installation of centralized traffic control. The latter is scheduled to take place as part of nationwide implementation of European Train Control System, which is scheduled to be completed within 2021. The National Rail Administration is considering the possibilities of electrifying the Solør Line along with all its other diesel lines. If a go-head was given, it would probably be in conjunction with the electrification of the Røros Line.

The primary impact of electrification would be a severe cut in operating costs of the railway companies, and thus better margins for forest owners, who could increase their export. A secondary impact would allow the Solør Line to also handle intermodule transport. Cargo trains could run directly from Gothenburg to Trondheim, via the Norway/Vänern, Värmland, Solør and Røros Lines, bypassing the congested cargo lines through Oslo. Intermodule cargo trains operate from Oslo to Trondheim via the Dovre Line, despite its higher elevation, because of the electric traction. If the Solør and Røros Lines were electrified, they could act as a reserve for the Dovre Line. This is not a possibility today because the train companies lack diesel locomotives. Further traffic increase could be handled through operating northbound trains along the Solør/Røros Line and southbound via the Dovre Line.

There have been political initiatives in Hedmark to re-establish passenger traffic on the line. Both the track and stations hold sufficient standard, but a concern is that some level crossings may need removing to allow for increased traffic. A 2012 report estimated that passenger services calling at four stations would allow a travel time between Kongsvinger and Elverum of 1 hour and 20 minutes, 35 minutes less than the current bus service. It recommended that the line be electrified and receive centralized traffic control first, which would allow for direct train services onwards to Oslo.

== Bibliography ==
- Bjerke, Thor; Holom, Finn (2004). Banedata 2004 (in Norwegian). Hamar / Oslo: Norwegian Railway Museum / Norwegian Railway Club. ISBN 82-90286-28-7.
- Broch, Just (1937). Av Norges statsbaners historie – III Anleggenes renessanse (in Norwegian). Oslo: J.W. Cappelens Forlag.
- Civitas (2012). Utvikling av Røros-og Solørbanen (PDF). Oslo: Civitas. Archived from the original on 17 June 2015.
- Gillebo, Rolf; Lein, Kristian (2002). Utvikling av Rørosbanen – rammebetingelser og betydning (PDF). Lillehammer: Østlandsforskning. ISBN 82-7356-516-5. ISSN 0809-1617. Archived (PDF) from the original on 17 June 2015.
- Hartmann, Eivind; Mangset, Øistein; Reisegg, Øyvind (1997). Neste stasjon (in Norwegian). Oslo: Gyldendal Norsk Forlag. ISBN 82-05-25294-7.
- Toreng, Egil; Stubberud, Juel (1994). Solørbanen 100 år – Kongsvinger–Flisa (in Norwegian). Kongsvinger: J. Stubberud.
