= Risberget Chapel =

Church in Innlandet, Norway

- Risberget kirkesal
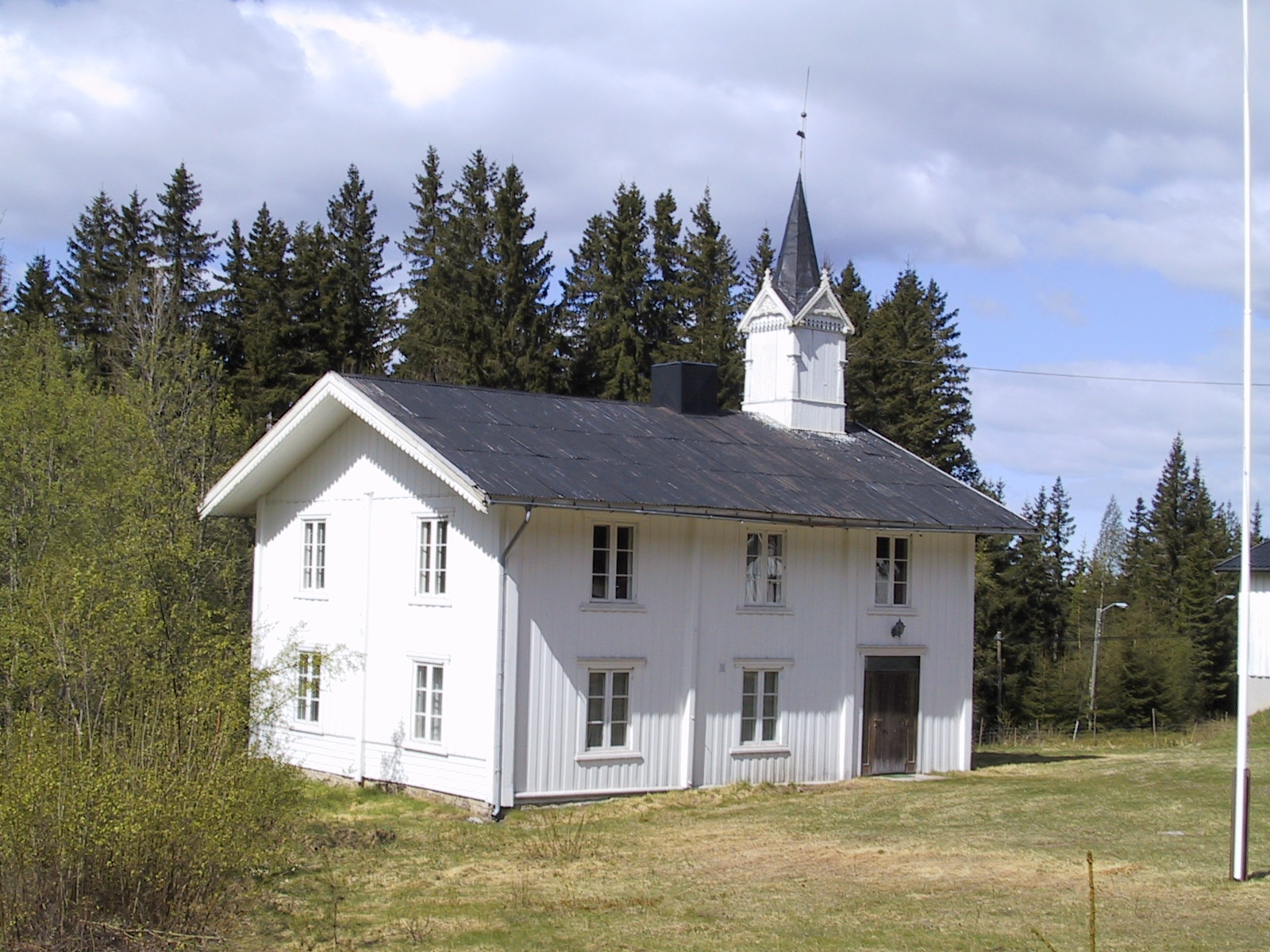
- View of the chapel
- Risberget Chapel
- 60°51′31″N 12°03′12″E
- Location: Våler Municipality, Innlandet
- Country: Norway
- Denomination: Church of Norway
- Churchmanship: Evangelical Lutheran

History
- Status: Chapel
- Founded: 1862
- Consecrated: 18 October 1863

Architecture
- Functional status: Active
- Architectural type: Rectangular
- Completed: 1862 (164 years ago)

Specifications
- Capacity: 60
- Materials: Wood

Administration
- Diocese: Hamar bispedømme
- Deanery: Solør, Vinger og Odal prosti
- Parish: Våler
- Norwegian Cultural Heritage Site
- Type: Church
- Status: Protected
- ID: 85301

Risberget Chapel (Norwegian: Risberget kirkesal) is a chapel of the Church of Norway in Våler Municipality in Innlandet county, Norway. It is located in the village of Risberget. It is an annex chapel in the Våler parish which is part of the Solør, Vinger og Odal prosti (deanery) in the Diocese of Hamar. The white, wooden chapel was built in a rectangular design in 1862 using plans drawn up by an unknown architect. The chapel seats about 60 people.

== History ==
Risberget Chapel is a rather unique church building in Norway. It looks like a 2-story house rather than a traditional church. When it was built in 1862, it was designed as a school house with an apartment for the teacher on the main floor. The second floor was designed as a large rectangular church hall where services can be held. The building was completed in 1862 and on 18 October 1863, the second floor was consecrated for church use. In 1899, a small bell tower was built on the roof. The school on the first floor is no longer used and this is the only "church hall" still in use in Norway (the others have been torn down and replaced with actual church buildings). Around the year 2010, the building was renovated to fix some rot problems with the structure and to refurbish the building.

== See also ==
- List of churches in Hamar
