= Våler (village) =

Village in Våler Municipality, Innlandet, Norway

Våler Vålbyen Vaaler (historic)
- Village
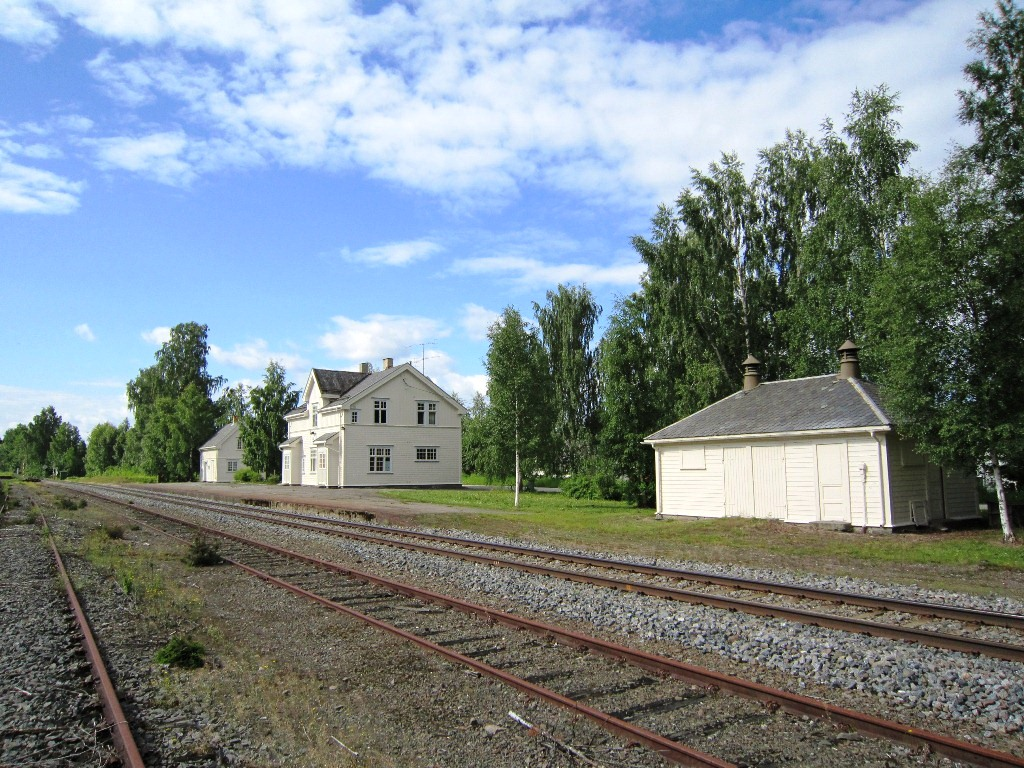
- View of the village railway station, along the Solørbanen
- Interactive map of Våler; Vålbyen
- Location within Innlandet Location within Norway
- Coordinates: 60.67123°N 11.83461°E
- Country: Norway
- Region: Eastern Norway
- County: Innlandet
- District: Solør
- Municipality: Våler Municipality

Area
  - Total: 1.28 km^{2} (0.49 sq mi)
- Elevation: 168 m (551 ft)

Population (2024)
  - Total: 1,110
  - Density: 867/km^{2} (2,250/sq mi)
- Time zone: UTC+01:00 (CET)
  - Summer (DST): UTC+02:00 (CEST)
- Post Code: 2436 Våler i Solør

Våler or Vålbyen is the administrative center of Våler Municipality in Innlandet county, Norway. The village lies along the river Glomma, about 14 kilometres (8.7 mi) northwest of the village of Flisa and about 30 kilometres (19 mi) southeast of the town of Elverum. The Norwegian National Road 2 and the Solørbanen railway line both run through the village. The village of Braskereidfoss lies about 6 kilometres (3.7 mi) to the north of this village.

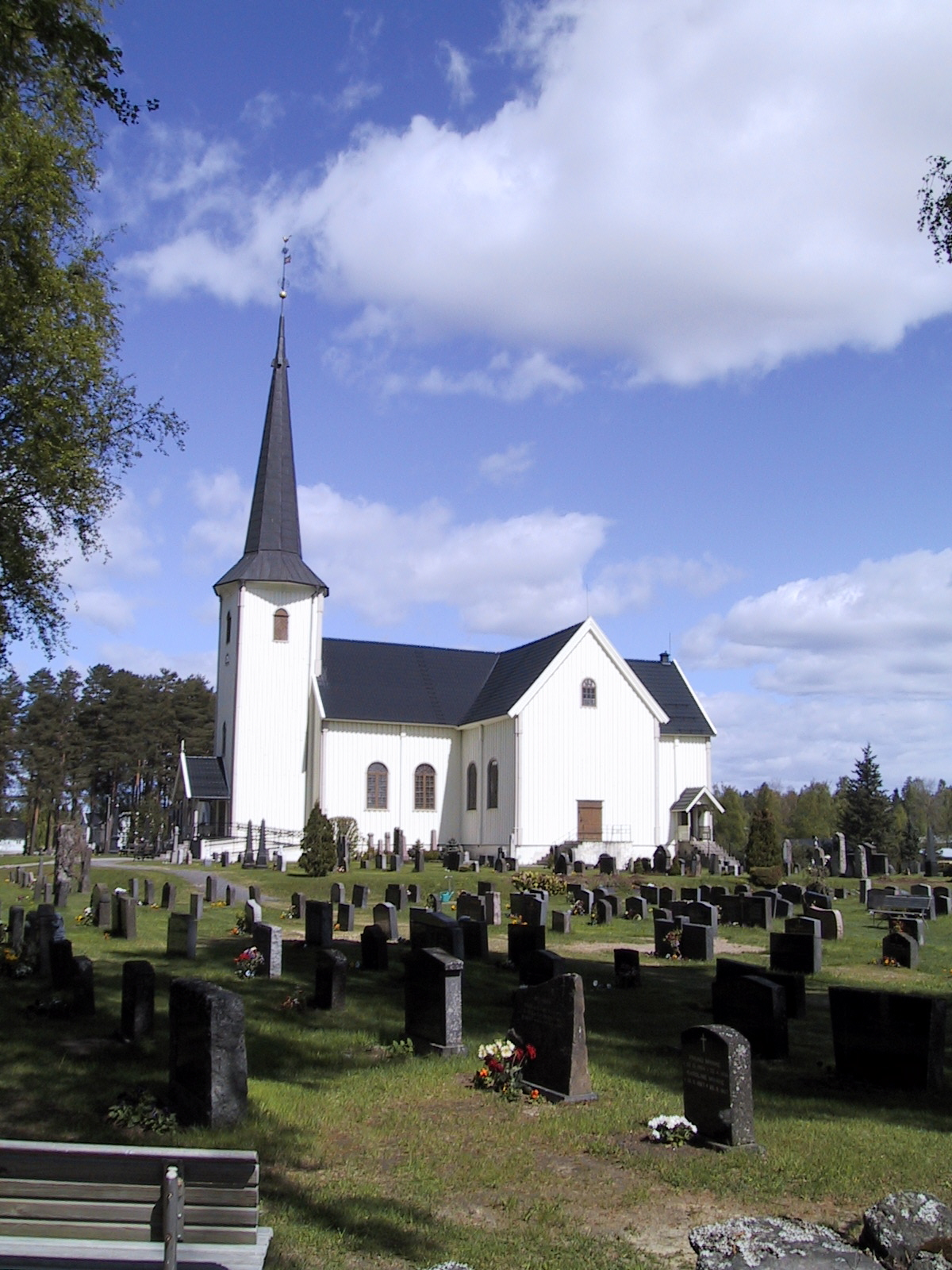
Våler Church (this building burned down in a fire in 2009) and it was subsequently rebuilt.

The 1.28-square-kilometre (320-acre) village has a population (2024) of 1,110 and a population density of 867 inhabitants per square kilometre (2,250/sq mi).

Between 1910 and 1994, the village was served by Våler Station which sat along on the Solørbanen railway line. Våler Church is also located in the village. The Haslemoen Airstrip lies just outside the village and it is used for small recreational aircraft. It is located on the site of the former Haslemoen military base before its closure in 2003.
