= Våler Church =

Church in Innlandet, Norway

- Våler kirke
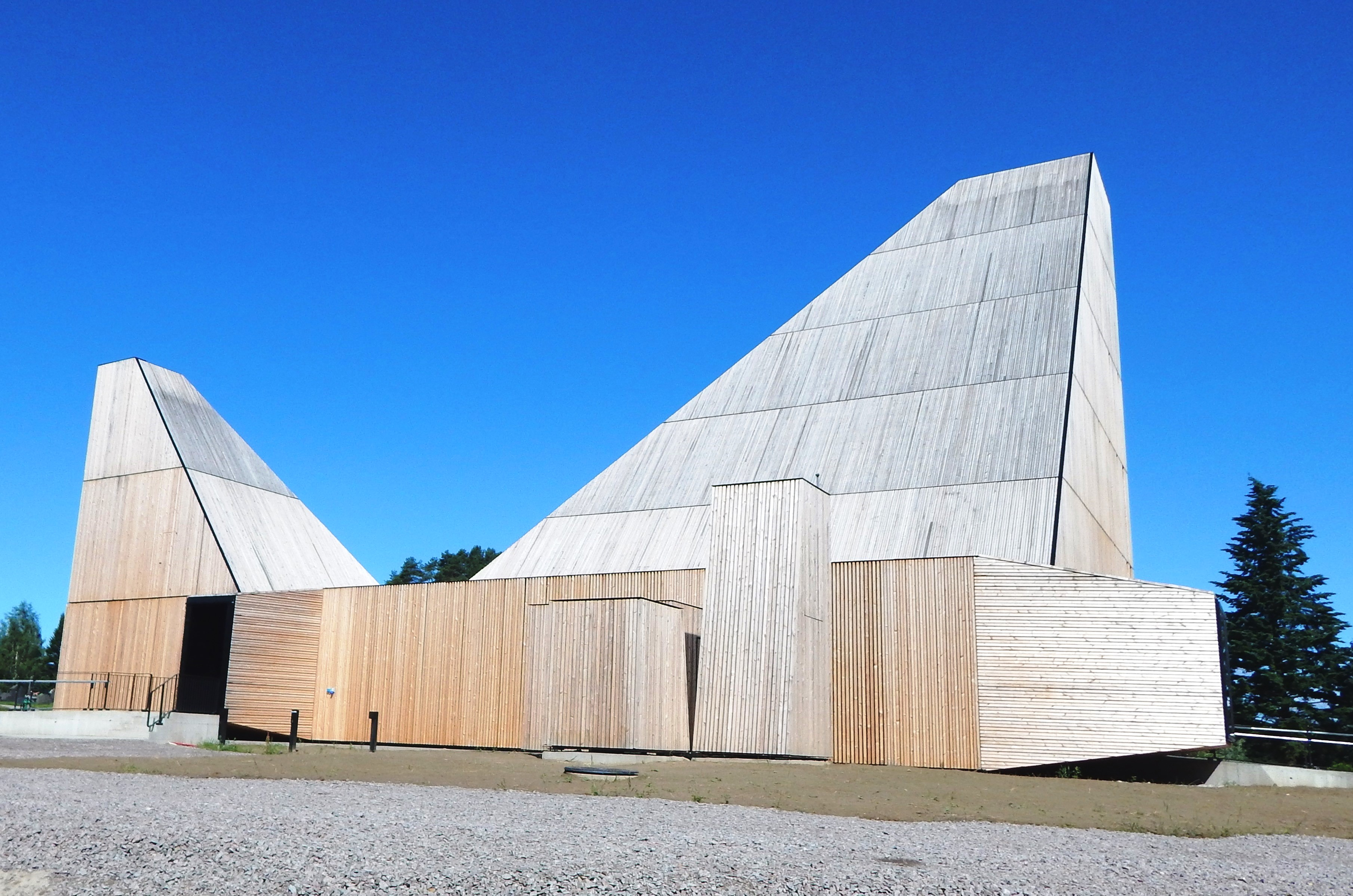
- View of the church Credit: Jan-Tore Egge
- Våler Church
- 60°40′22″N 11°50′10″E
- Location: Våler Municipality, Innlandet
- Country: Norway
- Denomination: Church of Norway
- Previous denomination: Catholic Church
- Churchmanship: Evangelical Lutheran

History
- Status: Parish church
- Founded: 11th century
- Consecrated: 24 May 2015
- Events: 2009: Fire

Architecture
- Functional status: Active
- Architect: Espen Surnevik
- Architectural type: Fan-shaped
- Completed: 2015 (11 years ago)

Specifications
- Capacity: 350
- Materials: Wood

Administration
- Diocese: Hamar bispedømme
- Deanery: Solør, Vinger og Odal prosti
- Parish: Våler
- Norwegian Cultural Heritage Site
- Type: Church
- Status: Not protected
- ID: 85885

Våler Church (Norwegian: Våler kirke) is a parish church of the Church of Norway in Våler Municipality in Innlandet county, Norway. It is located in the village of Våler. It is the church for the Våler parish which is part of the Solør, Vinger og Odal prosti (deanery) in the Diocese of Hamar. The beige, wooden church was built in a fan-shaped design in 2015 using plans drawn up by the architect Espen Surnevik. The church seats about 350 people.

== History ==
The earliest existing historical records of the church date back to the year 1394, but the church was not new that year. The first church in Våler was a wooden post church. According to tradition, the church was likely built during the 11th century, not long after Saint Olaf brought Christianity to the region in the year 1022. This church was located along the river Glomma, about 1.3 kilometres (0.81 mi) south of the present church site. Around the year 1200, a new, larger wooden stave church was built on the same site after the old church was torn down. There are decorative pieces from this old church that date to around the year 1200 that are preserved in museums. Some time before the year 1739, the old church had been renovated and enlarged by adding transepts to create a cruciform floor plan. By the year 1786, the church was described as in very poor condition and at the start of the 1800s, the parish was planning for a new church.

On 27 January 1804, the parish received permission to build a new timber-framed cruciform church on a new site about 1.3 kilometres (0.81 mi) to the north of the old site. This new site was closer to the village and further from the river, so it was a much better location. Construction began in 1804 on the new church and by 1806, the structure was completed and the interior furnishings were all in place. The new building was consecrated on 26 June 1806. The choir of the new building was in the eastern cross-arm of the nave, with a small sacristy attached to it. On the western end of the western cross-arm of the nave, there was a church porch and tower. During the 1860s, the interior was remodeled and redecorated. In 1916, the church was restored by Domenico Erdmann as a consultant and it was partly restored to the way it looked in the early 1800s as well as some of the medieval furnishings from the 13th century church.

On 29 May 2009, the old church caught fire and burned down. It was suspected that it was a case of arson, but no one was ever arrested for the crime. Some of the historic items from the church were saved including a medieval baptismal font, the old church silver, and some artwork. Planning for a new church began soon after. The old church was torn down, but the foundation was saved and cleaned up as a sort of memorial site that now sits in the middle of the graveyard. An architectural competition was held for the design of the new church and it was won by Espen Surnevik. The parish determined that the new church would be built beside the graveyard, about 75 metres (246 ft) east of the old church site. The new building is very modern-looking. It is a large square shape with two "towers" that look somewhat like slanted pyramids. The new building was consecrated on 24 May 2015.

=== Relics and ornaments ===
Among the church's relics, the baptismal font of soapstone is probably the oldest. It's from the 12th century, and is still in use. It is in the Romanesque style with interwoven patterns and vined acanthus ornamentation. It was probably carved at one of the stone quarries in Gudbrandsdal.

A beautiful chalice in Gothic style is an example of excellent 13th century craftsmanship, although it needed restoration in 1717.

A wrought iron ornament, also of the 13th century, which originally decorated the entrance door to the old stave church, is now reused in a 17th-century door placed in one of the church's side entrances.

An even older relic, Olavsspenningen or St. Olav's buckle, is now kept in the collection of ancient relics in Oslo. It is an iron buckle which is forged to look like a withy binding, and legend has it that it was on St. Olav's horse's bridle when St. Olav shot the arrow that determined the location of the Våler church. The buckle apparently fell off, and subsequently was presented as a memorial of the occasion.

A new altar piece was carved in 1697 by Johannes Skraastad (1648–1700) from Vang in Hedmark. The old altar piece from the 17th century, was restored around 1860 and now hangs in the northern end of the church.

== Media gallery ==
Images of the old church (1806–2009)

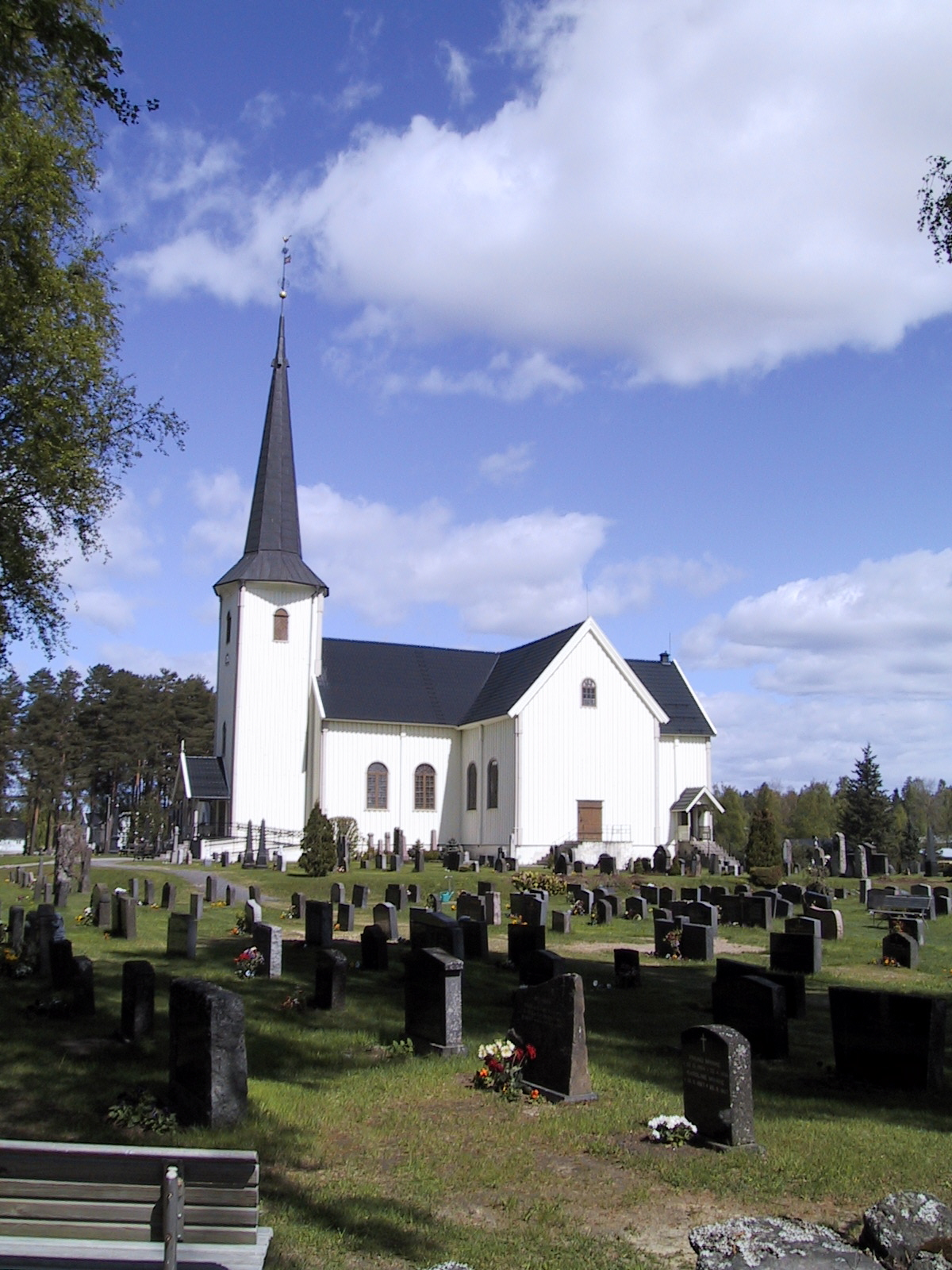

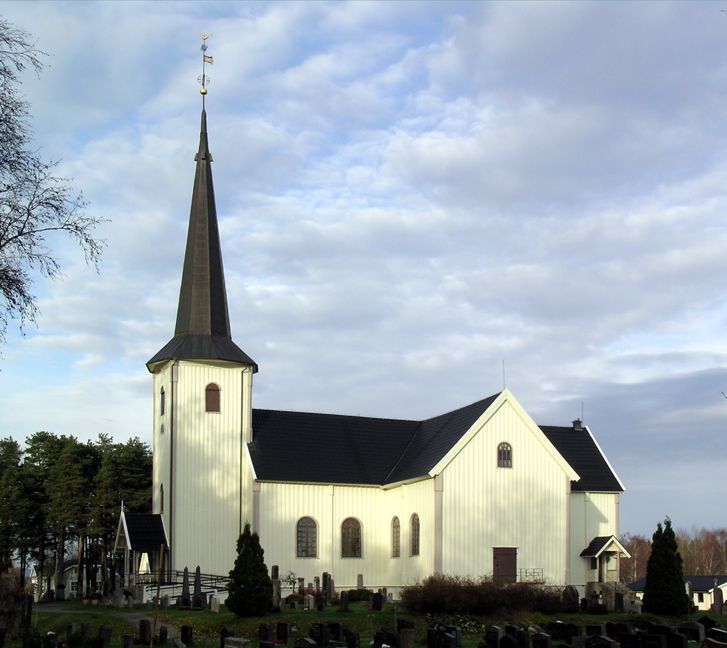

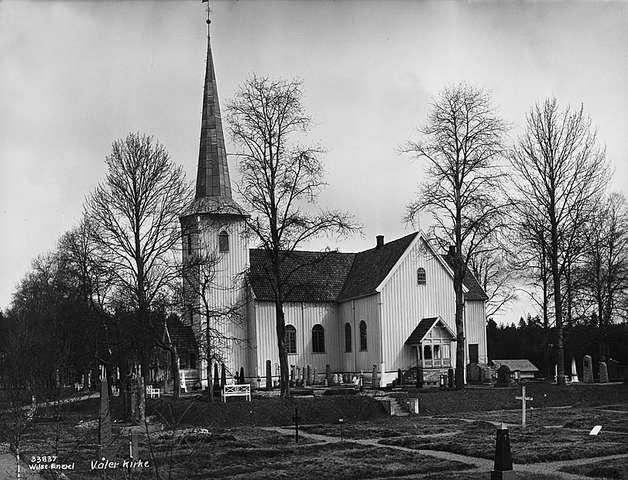

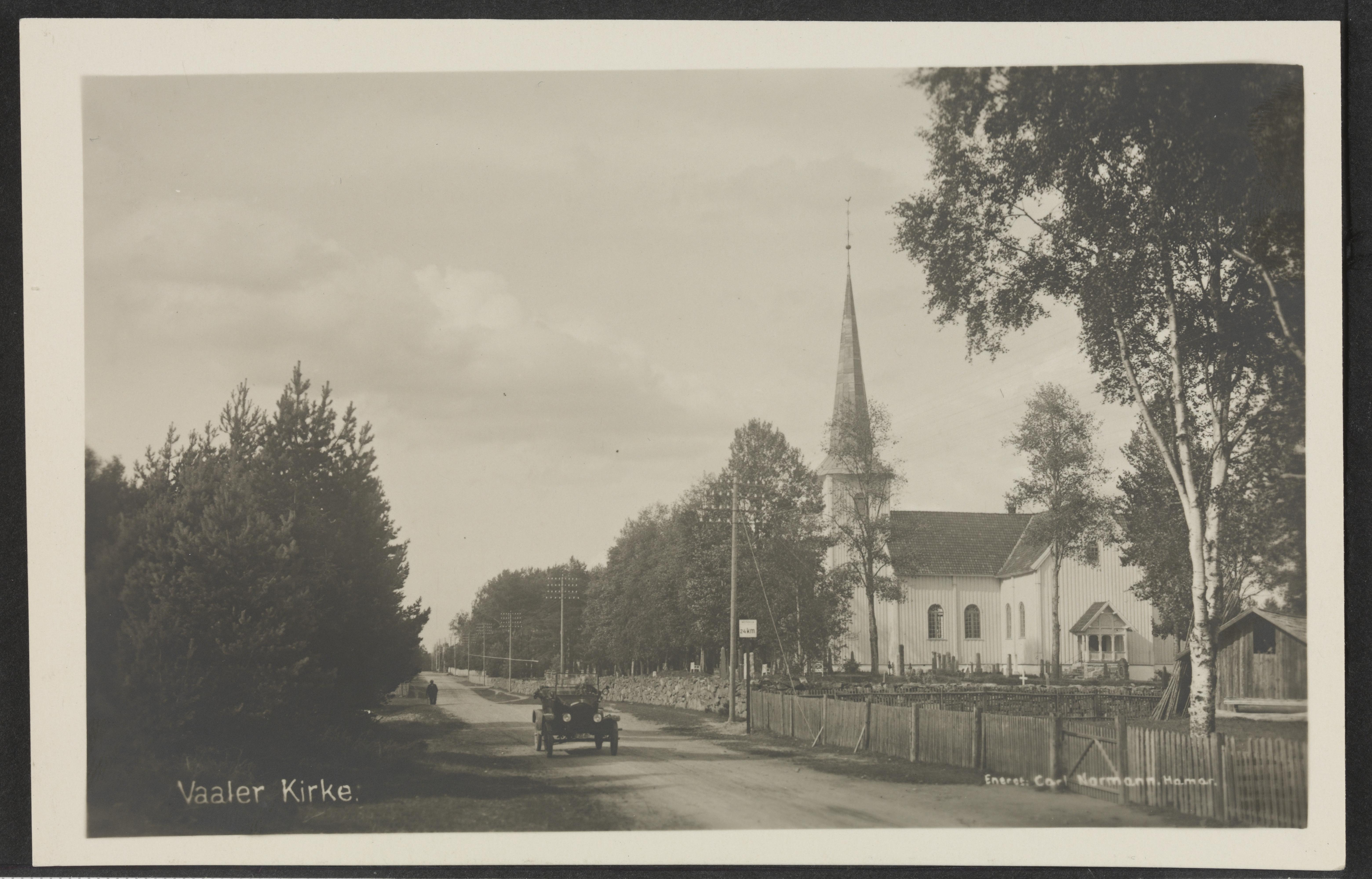

== See also ==
- List of churches in Hamar
