= Christian Halvorsen Svenkerud =

Norwegian politician

Christian Halvorsen Svenkerud (25 August 1798 – 2 April 1886) was a Norwegian politician.

He hailed from Solør.

He was elected to the Norwegian Parliament in 1839, 1842, 1848 and 1851, representing the rural constituency of Hedemarkens Amt (today named Hedmark). He worked as a farmer.
