= Våler Municipality (Innlandet) =

Municipality in Innlandet, Norway

Våler Municipality Våler kommune Våler i Solør
- Municipality
- Vaaler herred (historic name)
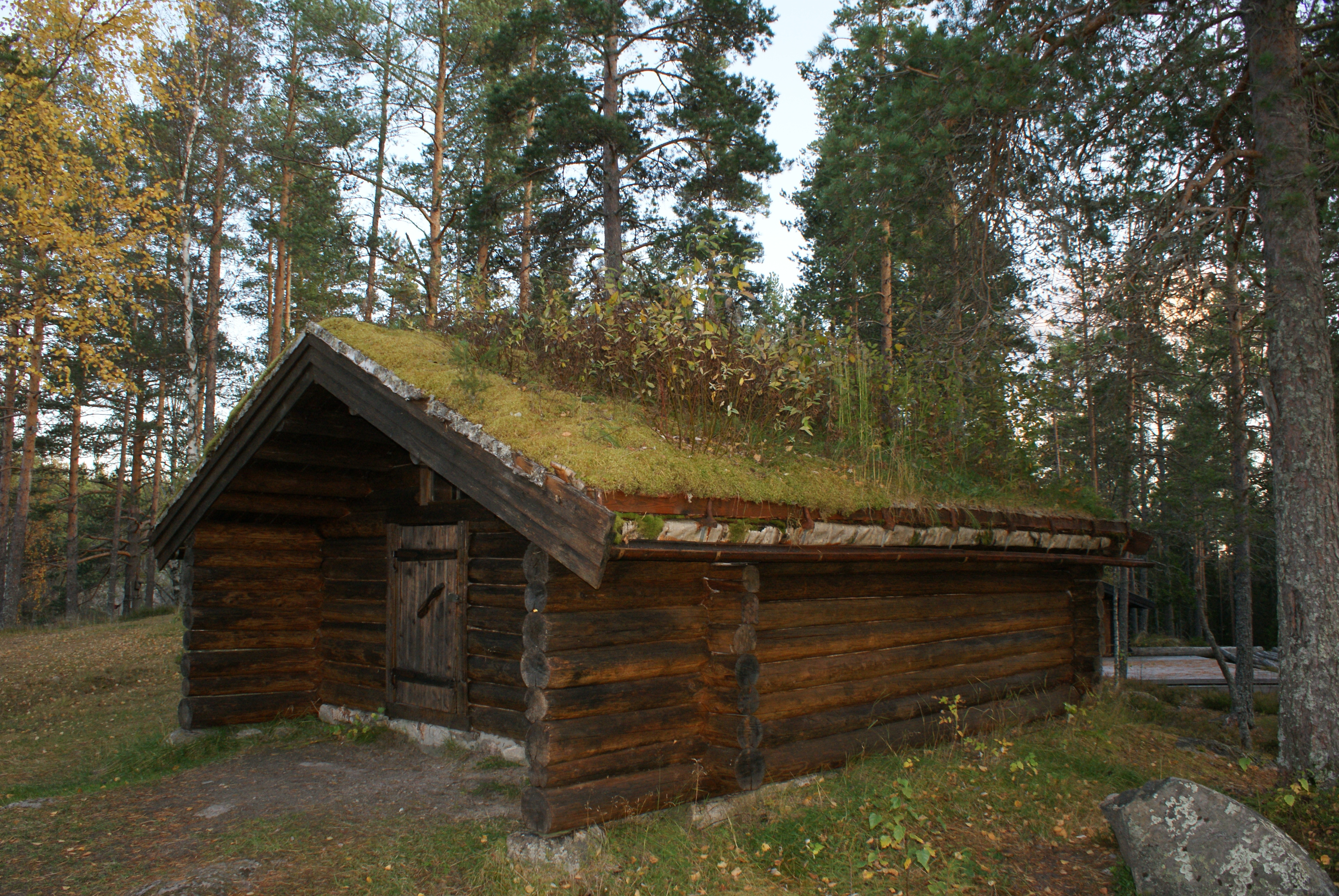
- Old cabin in the Våler forest

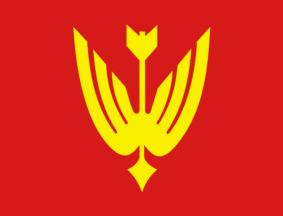
- Flag Coat of arms

- Innlandet within Norway

- Våler within Innlandet
- Coordinates: 60°45′12″N 11°53′51″E
- Country: Norway
- County: Innlandet
- District: Solør
- Established: 1854
  - Preceded by: Åsnes og Våler Municipality
- Administrative centre: Våler

Government
  - Mayor (2023): Harry Vinje (H)

Area
  - Total: 705.28 km^{2} (272.31 sq mi)
  - Land: 677.71 km^{2} (261.67 sq mi)
  - Water: 27.57 km^{2} (10.64 sq mi) 3.9%
  - Rank: #164 in Norway
- Highest elevation: 705.51 m (2,314.7 ft)

Population (2025)
  - Total: 3,559
  - Rank: #214 in Norway
  - Density: 5/km^{2} (13/sq mi)
  - Change (10 years): ▼ −6.1%
- Demonym(s): Vålsokning; Vålersokning

Official language
  - Norwegian form: Bokmål
- Time zone: UTC+01:00 (CET)
  - Summer (DST): UTC+02:00 (CEST)
- ISO 3166 code: NO-3419
- Website: Official website

Våler is a municipality in Innlandet county, Norway. It is located in the traditional district of Solør. The administrative centre of the municipality is the village of Våler. Other villages in Våler include Braskereidfoss, Gravberget, and Risberget.

The 705-square-kilometre (272 sq mi) municipality is the 164th largest by area out of the 357 municipalities in Norway. Våler Municipality is the 214th most populous municipality in Norway with a population of 3,559. The municipality's population density is 5 inhabitants per square kilometre (13/sq mi) and its population has decreased by 6.1% over the previous 10-year period.

== General information ==
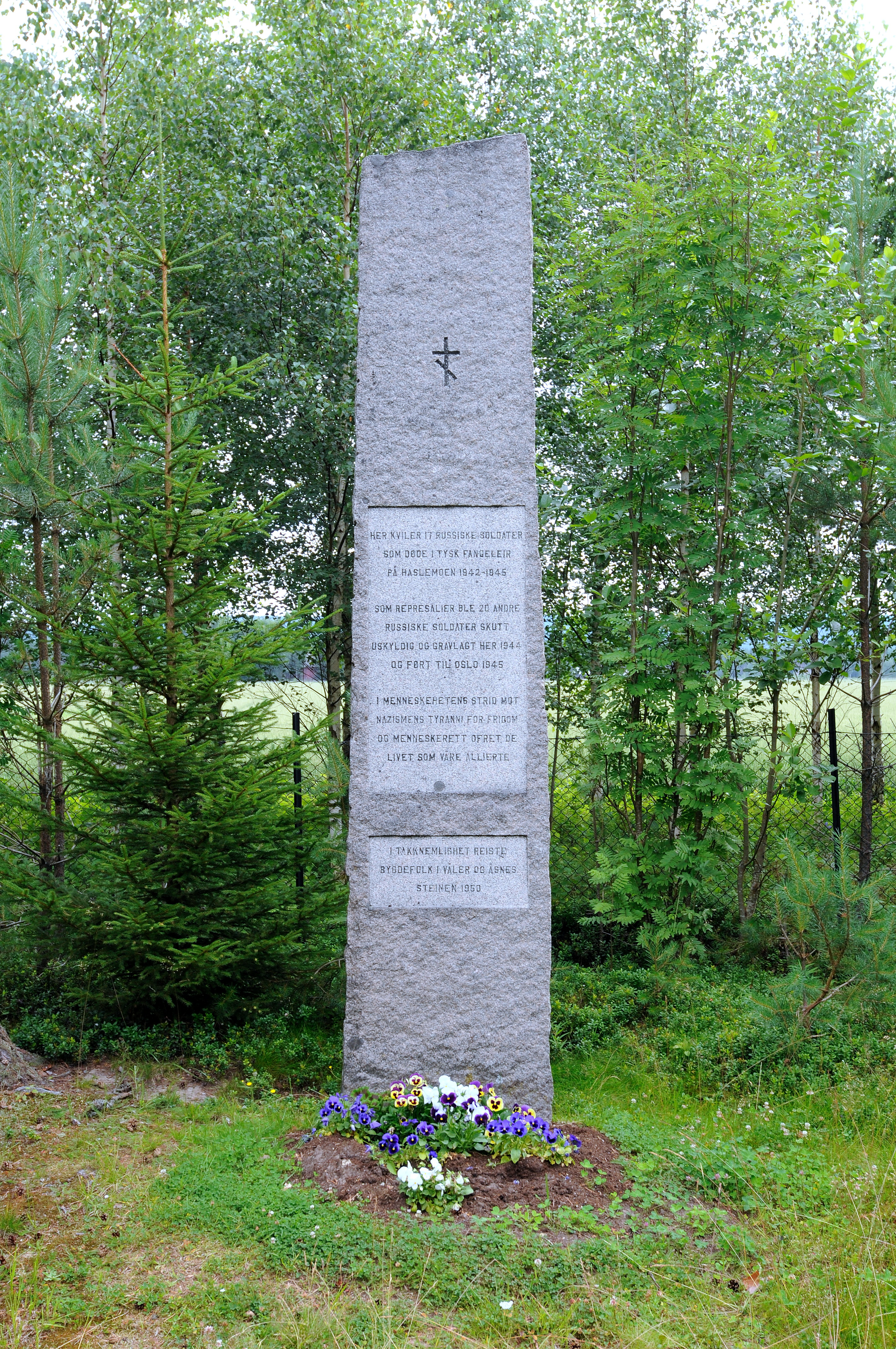
War memorial for Russian soldiers killed at Haslemoen during WWII

The area that is now Våler Municipality was historically part of the old Hof Municipality which was established on 1 January 1838 (see formannskapsdistrikt law). When it was established, Hof Municipality was made up of three areas: Hof, Aasnes, and Vaaler. In 1849, Hof Municipality was divided into two: Hof Municipality (population: 2,913) in the south and Aasnes og Vaaler Municipality (population: 7,087) in the north. In 1854, the relatively new Aasnes og Vaaler Municipality was divided into two again: Aasnes Municipality (population: 3,677) and Vaaler Municipality (population: 3,410). This division happened after a hard struggle, mainly led by Christian Halvorsen Svenkerud, a local member of parliament. The borders have not changed since that time.

Historically, the municipality was part of Hedmark county. On 1 January 2020, the municipality became a part of the newly-formed Innlandet county (after Hedmark and Oppland counties were merged).

=== Name ===
The municipality (originally the parish) is named after the old Våler farm (Old Norse: Válir) since the first Våler Church was built there. The first element is the plural form of váll which means "clearing in the woods".

On 21 December 1917, a royal resolution enacted the 1917 Norwegian language reforms. Prior to this change, the name was spelled Vaaler with the digraph "aa", and after this reform, the name was spelled Våler, using the letter å instead.

=== Coat of arms ===
The coat of arms was granted on 7 August 1987. The official blazon is "Gules, a downwards pointing winged arrow Or" (Norwegian: I rødt en nedvendt vinget gull pil). This means the arms have a red field (background) and the charge is a downwards pointing winged arrow. The charge has a tincture of Or which means it is commonly colored yellow, but if it is made out of metal, then gold is used. The design was chosen to symbolize the legend that in the year 1022, King Olaf II of Norway (Saint Olaf) decided to solve a local disagreement on where a church should be built. He did so by shooting an arrow from his bow, commanding that the church be built wherever the arrow hit the ground. A winged arrow is also a frequent medieval heraldic motif. This design also has a V-shape which alludes to the initial V for Våler. The arms were designed by John Arne Moseng. The municipal flag has the same design as the coat of arms.

=== Churches ===
The Church of Norway has two parishes (sokn) within Våler Municipality. It is part of the Solør, Vinger og Odal prosti (deanery) in the Diocese of Hamar.

Churches in Våler
Parish (sokn)	Church name	Location of the church	Year built
Gravberget	Gravberget Church	Gravberget	1955
Våler	Våler Church	Våler	2015
Våler	Risberget Chapel	Risberget	1862

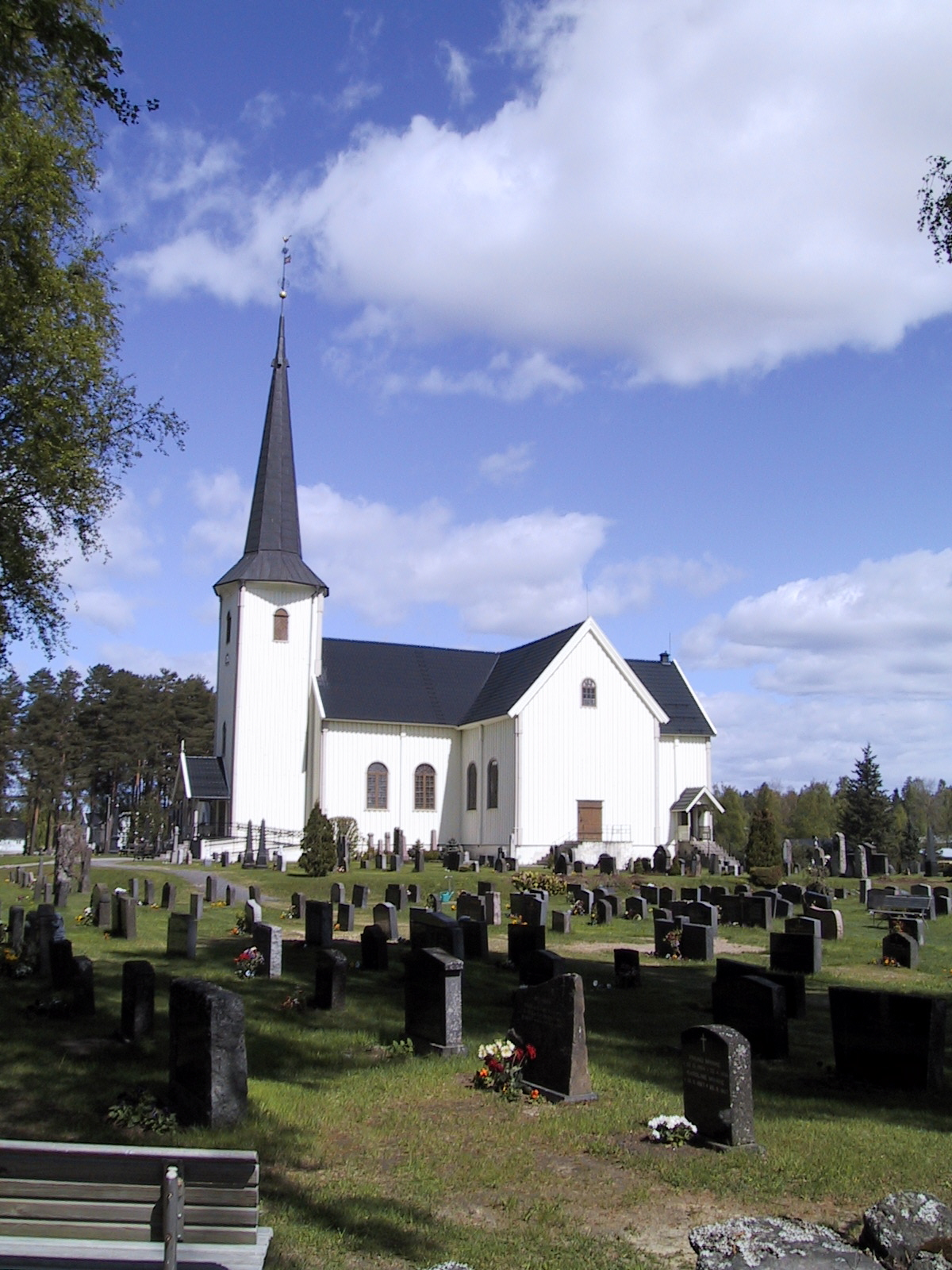
Våler Church

The first Våler Church was known as the Mariakirken. Legend says the church was established by Saint Olaf. The church was rebuilt several times. By 1686, the stave church that was standing at that time was in poor condition so it was renovated and restored. In 1804, the people of Våler asked the King permission to build a new church. It was permitted by the King, and so the construction of a new church started the same year. The church tower is dated 1805, and the dedication of the new church was 26 June 1806. The old stave church was then torn down. Today, there is a monument where the old church stood. On 29 May 2009, Våler Church was destroyed by an arson attack, which is suspected to be an act of satanist. It was rebuilt in 2015.

== Geography ==
The municipality is bordered in the north by Elverum Municipality, in the east by Trysil Municipality and the neighboring country of Sweden, in the south by Åsnes Municipality, and in the west by Stange Municipality.

The municipality lies at the north end of the traditional district of Solør, and it is often referred to as Våler i Solør (lit. 'Våler in Solør'). Solør is the geographical area that lies between the towns of Elverum and Kongsvinger. The eastern part of Solør (in the area bordering Sweden) is known as Finnskogen (lit. 'the forest of the "Finns"'). The highest point in the municipality is the 705.51-metre (2,314.7 ft) tall mountain Kjølberget, located near the border with Trysil Municipality and Sweden.

Agriculture and forestry are the main industries in Våler. With near 90% of the total area covered with forest, Våler is among the larger forested municipalities in Norway. Most of the agricultural areas are found near the river Glomma. The Solør Line runs through the municipality on the east bank of the river. The river Flisa also runs through the municipality.

== Government ==
Våler Municipality is responsible for primary education (through 10th grade), outpatient health services, senior citizen services, welfare and other social services, zoning, economic development, and municipal roads and utilities. The municipality is governed by a municipal council of directly elected representatives. The mayor is indirectly elected by a vote of the municipal council. The municipality is under the jurisdiction of the Hedmarken og Østerdal District Court and the Eidsivating Court of Appeal.

=== Municipal council ===
The municipal council (Kommunestyre) of Våler Municipality is made up of 19 representatives that are elected to four year terms. The tables below show the current and historical composition of the council by political party.

Våler kommunestyre 2023–2027
Party name (in Norwegian)	Number of representatives
Labour Party (Arbeiderpartiet)	5
Progress Party (Fremskrittspartiet)	1
Industry and Business Party (Industri‑ og Næringspartiet)	3
Pensioners' Party (Pensjonistpartiet)	2
Centre Party (Senterpartiet)	3
Local list Våler i Sølør (Bygdelista Våler i Solør)	4
The People's List (Folkelista)	1
Total number of members:	19

Våler kommunestyre 2019–2023
Party name (in Norwegian)	Number of representatives
Labour Party (Arbeiderpartiet)	4
Progress Party (Fremskrittspartiet)	1
Conservative Party (Høyre)	1
Pensioners' Party (Pensjonistpartiet)	1
Centre Party (Senterpartiet)	5
Socialist Left Party (Sosialistisk Venstreparti)	1
Local list Våler i Sølør (Bygdelista Våler i Solør)	3
The People's List (Folkelista)	3
Total number of members:	19

Våler kommunestyre 2015–2019
Party name (in Norwegian)	Number of representatives
Labour Party (Arbeiderpartiet)	6
Conservative Party (Høyre)	3
Pensioners' Party (Pensjonistpartiet)	1
Centre Party (Senterpartiet)	2
Socialist Left Party (Sosialistisk Venstreparti)	1
Liberal Party (Venstre)	4
Local list Våler's Future (Bygdelista Vålers framtid)	2
Total number of members:	19

Våler kommunestyre 2011–2015
Party name (in Norwegian)	Number of representatives
Labour Party (Arbeiderpartiet)	10
Progress Party (Fremskrittspartiet)	1
Conservative Party (Høyre)	2
Pensioners' Party (Pensjonistpartiet)	1
Centre Party (Senterpartiet)	2
Socialist Left Party (Sosialistisk Venstreparti)	1
Liberal Party (Venstre)	2
Total number of members:	19

Våler kommunestyre 2007–2011
Party name (in Norwegian)	Number of representatives
Labour Party (Arbeiderpartiet)	12
Progress Party (Fremskrittspartiet)	2
Conservative Party (Høyre)	1
Pensioners' Party (Pensjonistpartiet)	1
Centre Party (Senterpartiet)	2
Socialist Left Party (Sosialistisk Venstreparti)	1
Total number of members:	19

Våler kommunestyre 2003–2007
Party name (in Norwegian)	Number of representatives
Labour Party (Arbeiderpartiet)	7
Progress Party (Fremskrittspartiet)	3
Conservative Party (Høyre)	2
Pensioners' Party (Pensjonistpartiet)	2
Centre Party (Senterpartiet)	3
Socialist Left Party (Sosialistisk Venstreparti)	2
Total number of members:	19

Våler kommunestyre 1999–2003
Party name (in Norwegian)	Number of representatives
Labour Party (Arbeiderpartiet)	8
Progress Party (Fremskrittspartiet)	3
Conservative Party (Høyre)	4
Centre Party (Senterpartiet)	6
Socialist Left Party (Sosialistisk Venstreparti)	1
Local people's free list (Bygdefolkets frie liste)	1
Total number of members:	23

Våler kommunestyre 1995–1999
Party name (in Norwegian)	Number of representatives
Labour Party (Arbeiderpartiet)	9
Conservative Party (Høyre)	4
Centre Party (Senterpartiet)	6
Socialist Left Party (Sosialistisk Venstreparti)	2
Local people's free list (Bygdefolkets frie liste)	2
Total number of members:	23

Våler kommunestyre 1991–1995
Party name (in Norwegian)	Number of representatives
Labour Party (Arbeiderpartiet)	8
Conservative Party (Høyre)	4
Centre Party (Senterpartiet)	5
Socialist Left Party (Sosialistisk Venstreparti)	3
Local people's free list (Bygdefolkets frie liste)	3
Total number of members:	23

Våler kommunestyre 1987–1991
Party name (in Norwegian)	Number of representatives
Labour Party (Arbeiderpartiet)	10
Conservative Party (Høyre)	3
Centre Party (Senterpartiet)	3
Socialist Left Party (Sosialistisk Venstreparti)	3
Local people's free list (Bygdefolkets frie liste)	4
Total number of members:	23

Våler kommunestyre 1983–1987
Party name (in Norwegian)	Number of representatives
Labour Party (Arbeiderpartiet)	15
Conservative Party (Høyre)	3
Centre Party (Senterpartiet)	2
Socialist Left Party (Sosialistisk Venstreparti)	2
Local people's free list (Bygdefolkets frie liste)	1
Total number of members:	23

Våler kommunestyre 1979–1983
Party name (in Norwegian)	Number of representatives
Labour Party (Arbeiderpartiet)	13
Conservative Party (Høyre)	4
Christian Democratic Party (Kristelig Folkeparti)	1
Centre Party (Senterpartiet)	3
Socialist Left Party (Sosialistisk Venstreparti)	2
Total number of members:	23

Våler kommunestyre 1975–1979
Party name (in Norwegian)	Number of representatives
Labour Party (Arbeiderpartiet)	11
Conservative Party (Høyre)	2
Christian Democratic Party (Kristelig Folkeparti)	1
Centre Party (Senterpartiet)	4
Socialist Left Party (Sosialistisk Venstreparti)	4
Free voters (Frie velgere)	1
Total number of members:	23

Våler kommunestyre 1971–1975
Party name (in Norwegian)	Number of representatives
Labour Party (Arbeiderpartiet)	14
Conservative Party (Høyre)	2
Centre Party (Senterpartiet)	4
Socialist People's Party (Sosialistisk Folkeparti)	2
Socialist common list (Venstresosialistiske felleslister)	1
Total number of members:	23

Våler kommunestyre 1967–1971
Party name (in Norwegian)	Number of representatives
Labour Party (Arbeiderpartiet)	13
Conservative Party (Høyre)	3
Communist Party (Kommunistiske Parti)	1
Centre Party (Senterpartiet)	3
Socialist People's Party (Sosialistisk Folkeparti)	2
Local List(s) (Lokale lister)	1
Total number of members:	23

Våler kommunestyre 1963–1967
Party name (in Norwegian)	Number of representatives
Labour Party (Arbeiderpartiet)	13
Conservative Party (Høyre)	3
Communist Party (Kommunistiske Parti)	3
Centre Party (Senterpartiet)	3
Socialist People's Party (Sosialistisk Folkeparti)	1
Total number of members:	23

Våler herredsstyre 1959–1963
Party name (in Norwegian)	Number of representatives
Labour Party (Arbeiderpartiet)	11
Conservative Party (Høyre)	2
Communist Party (Kommunistiske Parti)	5
Christian Democratic Party (Kristelig Folkeparti)	1
Centre Party (Senterpartiet)	4
Total number of members:	23

Våler herredsstyre 1955–1959
Party name (in Norwegian)	Number of representatives
Labour Party (Arbeiderpartiet)	10
Conservative Party (Høyre)	2
Communist Party (Kommunistiske Parti)	6
Christian Democratic Party (Kristelig Folkeparti)	1
Farmers' Party (Bondepartiet)	4
Total number of members:	23

Våler herredsstyre 1951–1955
Party name (in Norwegian)	Number of representatives
Labour Party (Arbeiderpartiet)	6
Conservative Party (Høyre)	1
Communist Party (Kommunistiske Parti)	6
Farmers' Party (Bondepartiet)	3
Total number of members:	16

Våler herredsstyre 1947–1951
Party name (in Norwegian)	Number of representatives
Labour Party (Arbeiderpartiet)	6
Communist Party (Kommunistiske Parti)	7
Christian Democratic Party (Kristelig Folkeparti)	1
Farmers' Party (Bondepartiet)	2
Total number of members:	16

Våler herredsstyre 1945–1947
Party name (in Norwegian)	Number of representatives
Labour Party (Arbeiderpartiet)	6
Communist Party (Kommunistiske Parti)	7
Joint List(s) of Non-Socialist Parties (Borgerlige Felleslister)	3
Total number of members:	16

Våler herredsstyre 1937–1941*
Party name (in Norwegian)	Number of representatives
Labour Party (Arbeiderpartiet)	9
Communist Party (Kommunistiske Parti)	2
Nasjonal Samling Party (Nasjonal Samling)	1
Farmers' Party (Bondepartiet)	4
Total number of members:	16
Note: Due to the German occupation of Norway during World War II, no elections were held for new municipal councils until after the war ended in 1945.

=== Mayors ===
The mayor (Norwegian: ordfører) of Våler Municipality is the political leader of the municipality and the chairperson of the municipal council. Here is a list of people who have held this position:

- 1854–1857: Christian Halvorsen Svenkerud
- 1858–1861: Rev. N.G. Berg
- 1862–1873: Christian Halvorsen Svenkerud
- 1874–1877: Ole Lundebye
- 1878–1879: Peder P. Rud
- 1880–1904: Hermann Hansen Aarsrud (V)
- 1904–1912: Dr. Peder Nicolai Sjursen (V)
- 1913–1918: Halvdan Aarsrud (Ap)
- 1919–1919: Olaf Rundberget (NKP)
- 1920–1922: Peder Gjerdrum (V)
- 1922–1925: Olaf Rundberget (NKP)
- 1925–1931: Martin Knashaug (NKP)
- 1931–1940: John Eggen (Ap)
- 1941–1945: Ole Græsmo (NS)
- 1945–1945: John Eggen (Ap)
- 1945–1951: Knut K. Hagen (NKP)
- 1951–1959: John Eggen (Ap)
- 1959–1961: Arve Nyberg (Ap)
- 1961–1963: Knut K. Hagen (NKP)
- 1963–1971: Trygve Nordermoen (Ap)
- 1971–1975: Arve Nyberg (Ap)
- 1975–1987: Bård Gundersen (Ap)
- 1987–1991: Mikal Lundstein (H)
- 1991–1999: Inge Lundeby (Ap)
- 1999–2003: Ivar Arnesen (Sp)
- 2003–2015: Kjell Konterud (Ap)
- 2015–2019: Lise Berger Svenkerud (H)
- 2019–2023: Ola Cato Lie (Sp)
- 2023–present: Harry Vinje (H)

== History ==
Number of minorities (1st and 2nd generation) in Våler by country of origin in 2017
Ancestry	Number
Lithuania	45
Poland	41
Sweden	28
Germany	26
Iceland	19

=== Stone Age ===
It is not known for certain when the first humans arrived in Våler, but it is thought to be at the end of the Neolithic era (4000–1800 BC). Tools made of flint have been found that are dated to about 2000 BC. Flint is not natural to the area, indicating it came along trade routes from the south.

The first humans in the deep forests of Våler lived mainly by hunting and fishing. Even though the people around the nearby lake Mjøsa already kept livestock and grew crops, some time passed before the people in Våler settled as farmers.

=== Pre-Christian times ===
From about 1000 BC there are findings that indicate settlements in Våler. In the Viking Age, from about 700–1000 AD, Våler became more than just a few settled farms. At one stage in history, Solør was a powerful petty kingdom.

The name Våler comes from the Old Norse word vål, which means “trunks, or stumps (roots) from burnt trees in a clearing.” Names which are variations of vål are common in Norway as the first stage of clearing woodland for cultivation was to burn the trees and undergrowth.

The conversion of Hedemark to Christianity is mentioned in the book Heimskringla (The Chronicle of the Kings of Norway) by Snorri Sturluson. According to legend, King Olaf II of Norway (Saint Olaf) went to Våler to convert the heathens to Christianity in 1022 AD. At first there was some resistance, but resistance proved to be futile. The farmers were quickly convinced to convert to Christianity, as in many other areas of Norway. The king decided that they had to build a church, but the locals couldn't agree where to place it. So the king settled the matter in a simple and efficient way. He took his bow, and shot an arrow up in the air and declared that wherever the arrow landed, the church was to be built. The arrow landed in a vål at the banks of the river Glomma. This incident gave name to both the place and the church. (Although later the church was called Mariakirken, which translates to Church of Mary). Våler Municipality's coat of arms illustrates Saint Olaf's arrow.

=== Medieval period ===
During the Middle Ages, Våler was just an outpost far from the main travel route. Those few who went through, were either wanderers or pilgrims heading for Saint Olaf's tomb in Nidaros (later Trondheim). One pilgrim's route for Swedish pilgrims lay through Eidskog, Solør, and Elverum; Adam of Bremen mentions this route as early as 1070. Along this route, the pilgrims often stopped at the spring at Våler, where legend had it that Saint Olaf had watered his horse; the water was supposed to possess wonderful curative properties.

The Black Death spread through Norway between 1348 and 1350. We do not know how hard Våler was affected by the plague, but a legend tells that only one boy and one girl survived.

By the 17th century, there was quite a lot of livestock in Våler. As the technology improved, the forestry became more and more important in the forests along the many rivers and lakes in the area.

=== Finnish immigration ===
An important part of Våler's and Solør's history, is the immigration and settlement of people from Finland. From the late 16th century they were encouraged by Swedish king Gustav Vasa to settle in the unpopulated areas of Värmland and Solør, along the border between Norway and Sweden. At that time the forests far from the settled areas of the two countries were of little value, and therefore immigrants could settle in large numbers without coming into conflict with the locals. The Finnish immigration was a result of hunger and turbulent times in Finland. King Gustav Vasa welcomed the immigrants, because he wanted to increase the taxable income from the scarcely populated areas of western Sweden.

The Finns brought with them their unique culture and their way of life. Amongst other things, they imported the agricultural technique, common in Finland and Eastern Sweden, known as svedjebruk or slash-burn agriculture. This involved setting fire to the forest and growing crops on the fertile ash-covered soil. The clearing was initially planted to rye, and then in the second and third year with turnips or cabbages. It then might be grazed for several years before being allowed to return to woodland. In this manner, they periodically moved around and burned down new areas and left their former areas to regrow with forest.

The Finnish language, still has an influence in the area. Many place names and words and expressions in the local dialects derive from the Finnish. The area itself is called Finnskogen, which translates as "The Finnish forest".

== Notable people ==
- Bernt Lund (1812 in Våler, Hedmark – 1885), a landscape artist, author, and military officer
- Hermann Hansen Aarsrud (1837 in Våler, Hedmark – 1927), a farmer, politician, and Mayor of Våler from 1879 to 1904
- Halvdan Aarsrud (1878 in Våler, Hedmark – 1925), a bailiff, politician, and Mayor of Våler during WWI
- Jo Inge Bjørnebye (1946 in Våler, Hedmark – 2013), a ski jumper who competed at the 1968 Winter Olympics
- Finn Halvorsen (born 1947 in Våler, Hedmark), a former ski jumper who competed at the 1976 Winter Olympics
- Aage Rundberget (born 1947 in Våler, Hedmark), a Norwegian judge and civil servant

== See also ==
- Vålerbanen, a motor racing circuit in the municipality.
