= Hof Municipality (Hedmark) =

Former municipality in Hedmark, Norway

Hof Municipality Hof herred
- Former municipality
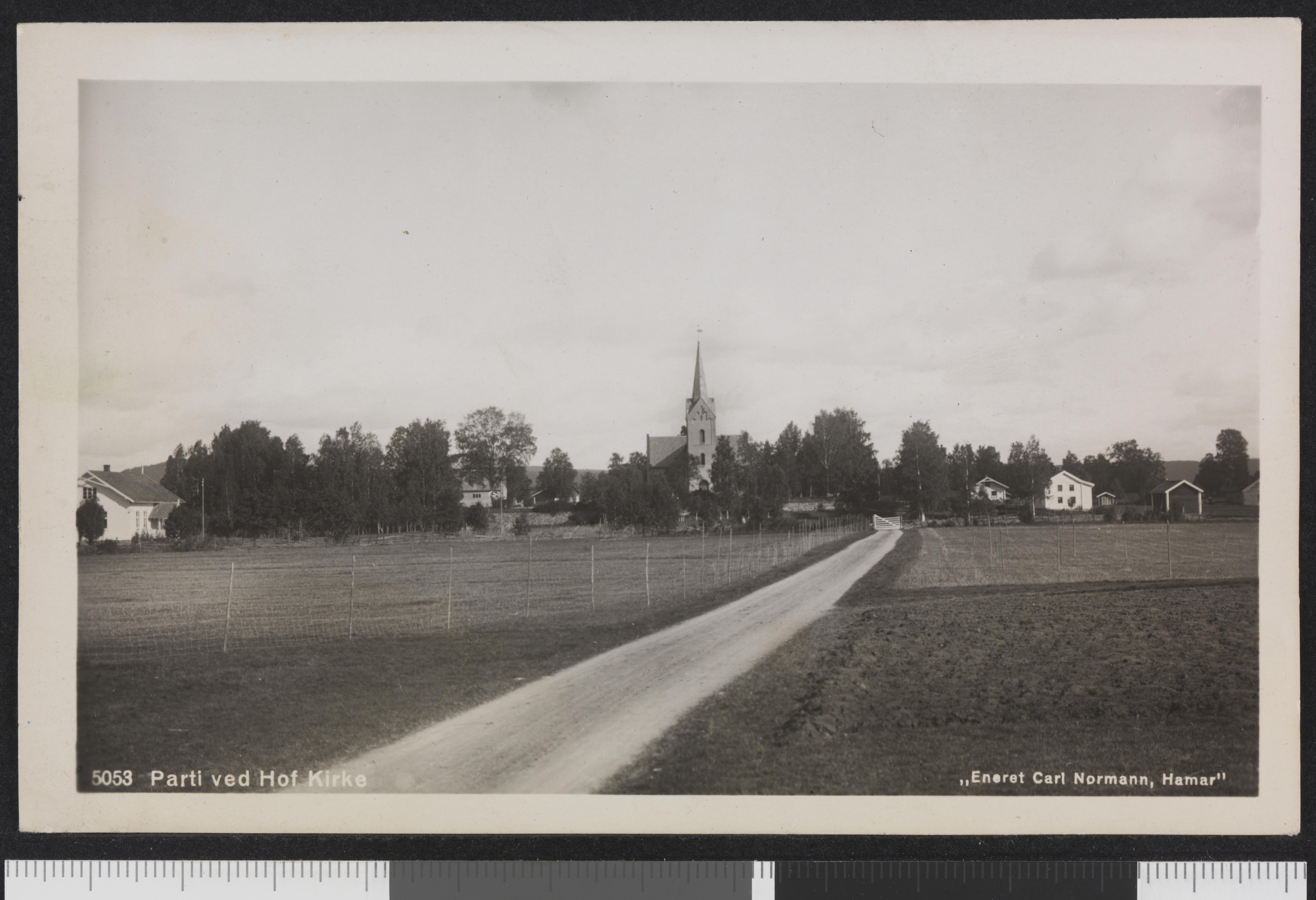
- View of the village of Hof

- Hedmark within Norway

- Hof within Hedmark
- Coordinates: 60°33′10″N 12°01′19″E
- Country: Norway
- County: Hedmark
- District: Solør
- Established: 1 Jan 1838
  - Created as: Formannskapsdistrikt
- Disestablished: 1 Jan 1963
  - Succeeded by: Åsnes Municipality
- Administrative centre: Hof

Government
  - Mayor (1959–1963): Thorstein Haugen (Ap)

Area (upon dissolution)
  - Total: 422.4 km^{2} (163.1 sq mi)
  - Rank: #226 in Norway
- Highest elevation: 634.6 m (2,082 ft)

Population (1962)
  - Total: 3,285
  - Rank: #272 in Norway
  - Density: 7.8/km^{2} (20/sq mi)
  - Change (10 years): ▼ −4.6%

Official language
  - Norwegian form: Bokmål
- Time zone: UTC+01:00 (CET)
  - Summer (DST): UTC+02:00 (CEST)
- ISO 3166 code: NO-0424

Hof is a former municipality in the old Hedmark county, Norway. The 422.4-square-kilometre (163.1 sq mi) municipality existed from 1838 until its dissolution in 1963. The area is now part of Åsnes Municipality in the traditional district of Solør. The administrative centre was the village of Hof where the old Hof Church is located.

Prior to its dissolution in 1963, the 422.4-square-kilometre (163.1 sq mi) municipality was the 226th largest by area out of the 705 municipalities in Norway. Hof Municipality was the 272nd most populous municipality in Norway with a population of about 3,285. The municipality's population density was 7.8 inhabitants per square kilometre (20/sq mi) and its population had decreased by 4.6% over the previous 10-year period.

== General information ==
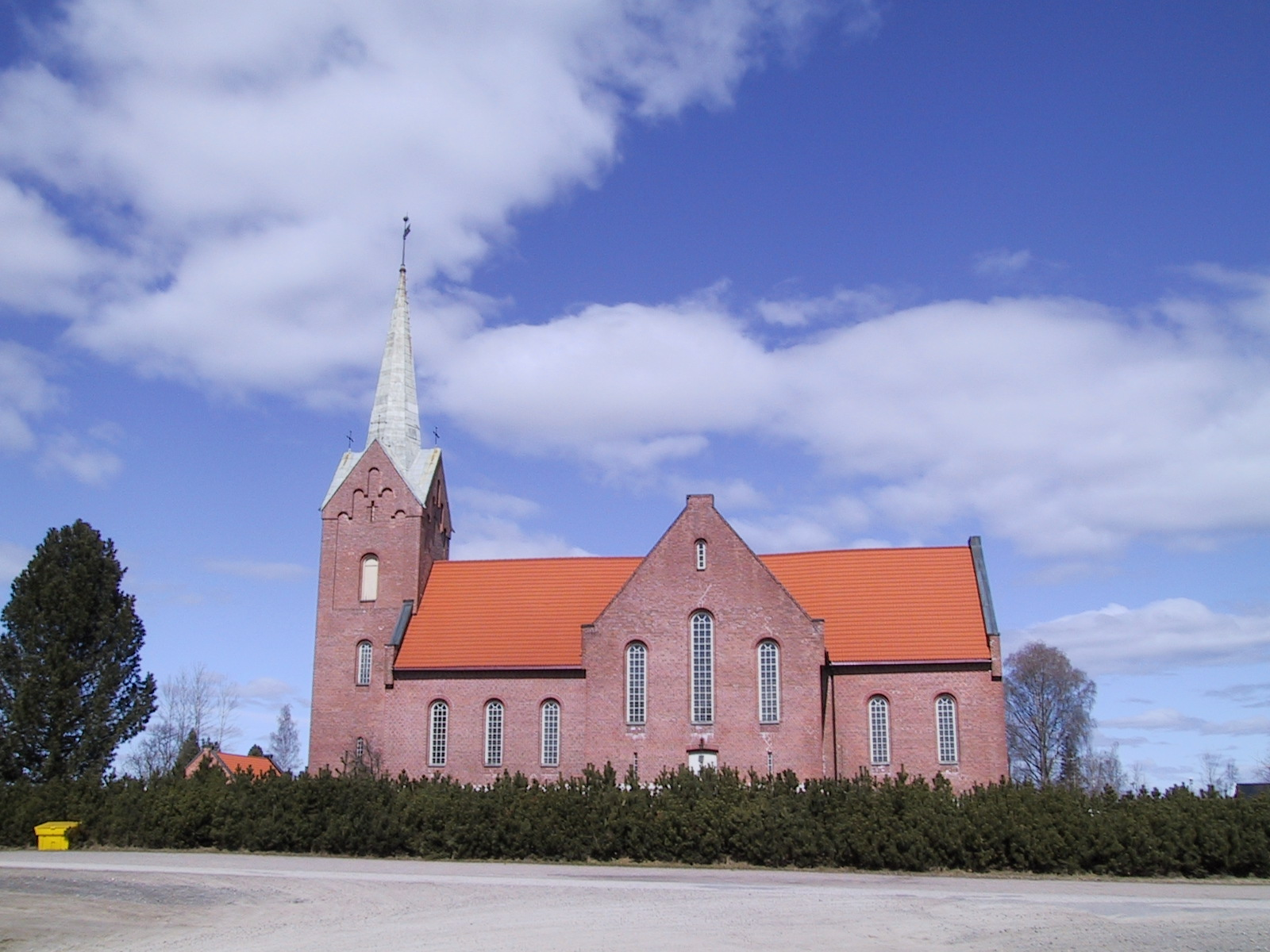
Hof Church in Åsnes

Historically, the prestegjeld of Hof included the main parish plus the sub-parishes of Aasnes and Vaaler. The whole parish of Hof was established as a municipality on 1 January 1838 (see formannskapsdistrikt law). In 1849, the two northern areas of Hof Municipality were separated to form the new Aasnes og Vaaler Municipality (population: 7,087), which drastically reduced the size of Hof Municipality (population: 2,913).

During the 1960s, there were many municipal mergers across Norway due to the work of the Schei Committee. On 1 January 1963, Hof Municipality (population: 3,222) was merged into the neighboring Åsnes Municipality (population: 6,750). On 1 January 1969 the Rotberget area in Åsnes Municipality (population: 23), which had been a part of the old Hof Municipality until the 1963 merger, was transferred to the neighboring Grue Municipality.

=== Name ===
The municipality (originally the parish) is named after the old Hof farm (Old Norse: Hof) since the first Hof Church was built there. The name is identical with the word hof which means "shrine" or a "pagan temple hall" (as in a temple of the Old Norse gods).

=== Churches ===
The Church of Norway had one parish (sokn) within Hof Municipality. At the time of the municipal dissolution, it was part of the Hof prestegjeld and the Solør prosti (deanery) in the Diocese of Hamar.

Churches in Hof
| Parish (sokn) | Church name | Location of the church | Year built |
|---|---|---|---|
| Hof | Hof Church | Hof | 1861 |
| Hof | Arneberg Chapel | Jammerdalen | 1878 |
| Hof | Hof Finnskog Chapel | Dulpetorpet | 1953 |

== Geography ==
Hof was located in the traditional district of Solør. Hof Municipality was bordered by Grue Municipality to the south, Nord-Odal Municipality to the west, Romedal Municipality to the northwest, Åsnes Municipality to the north, and by the Kingdom of Sweden to the east. The eastern part of the municipality was part of the Finnskogen area. The highest point in the municipality was the 634.6-metre (2,082 ft) tall mountain Elgklintsrøysa, a tripoint on the border between Hof Municipality and Åsnes Municipality in Norway and Finnskoga-Dalby Municipality in Sweden (now part of Torsby Municipality).

== Government ==
While it existed, Hof Municipality was responsible for primary education (through 10th grade), outpatient health services, senior citizen services, welfare and other social services, zoning, economic development, and municipal roads and utilities. The municipality was governed by a municipal council of directly elected representatives. The mayor was indirectly elected by a vote of the municipal council. The municipality was under the jurisdiction of the Eidsivating Court of Appeal.

=== Municipal council ===
The municipal council (Herredsstyre) of Hof Municipality was made up of 19 representatives that were elected to four year terms. The tables below show the historical composition of the council by political party.

Hof herredsstyre 1959–1963
| Party name (in Norwegian) | Number of representatives |
|---|---|
| Labour Party (Arbeiderpartiet) | 11 |
| Communist Party (Kommunistiske Parti) | 2 |
| Christian Democratic Party (Kristelig Folkeparti) | 2 |
| Centre Party (Senterpartiet) | 4 |
| Total number of members: | 19 |

Hof herredsstyre 1955–1959
| Party name (in Norwegian) | Number of representatives |
|---|---|
| Labour Party (Arbeiderpartiet) | 11 |
| Communist Party (Kommunistiske Parti) | 3 |
| Christian Democratic Party (Kristelig Folkeparti) | 1 |
| Farmers' Party (Bondepartiet) | 4 |
| Total number of members: | 19 |

Hof herredsstyre 1951–1955
| Party name (in Norwegian) | Number of representatives |
|---|---|
| Labour Party (Arbeiderpartiet) | 9 |
| Communist Party (Kommunistiske Parti) | 2 |
| Christian Democratic Party (Kristelig Folkeparti) | 2 |
| Farmers' Party (Bondepartiet) | 3 |
| Total number of members: | 16 |

Hof herredsstyre 1947–1951
| Party name (in Norwegian) | Number of representatives |
|---|---|
| Labour Party (Arbeiderpartiet) | 8 |
| Communist Party (Kommunistiske Parti) | 4 |
| Christian Democratic Party (Kristelig Folkeparti) | 1 |
| Joint List(s) of Non-Socialist Parties (Borgerlige Felleslister) | 3 |
| Total number of members: | 16 |

Hof herredsstyre 1945–1947
| Party name (in Norwegian) | Number of representatives |
|---|---|
| Labour Party (Arbeiderpartiet) | 7 |
| Communist Party (Kommunistiske Parti) | 4 |
| Christian Democratic Party (Kristelig Folkeparti) | 2 |
| Joint List(s) of Non-Socialist Parties (Borgerlige Felleslister) | 3 |
| Total number of members: | 16 |

Hof herredsstyre 1937–1941*
| Party name (in Norwegian) | Number of representatives |
|---|---|
| Labour Party (Arbeiderpartiet) | 10 |
| Joint List(s) of Non-Socialist Parties (Borgerlige Felleslister) | 4 |
| Local List(s) (Lokale lister) | 2 |
| Total number of members: | 16 |
Note: Due to the German occupation of Norway during World War II, no elections were held for new municipal councils until after the war ended in 1945.

=== Mayors ===
The mayor (Norwegian: ordfører) of Hof Municipality was the political leader of the municipality and the chairperson of the municipal council. The following people have held this position (incomplete list):

- 1838–1841: H.L. Bergh
- 1848-1848: Mr. Poppe
- 1849–1849: Mr. Simensen
- 1850–1852: Pastor Storen
- 1860–1871: M. Isaksen
- 1872–1879: J. Noer
- 1880–1891: H.G. Kveseth (H)
- 1892–1893: Christian Lommerud (V)
- 1893–1895: A. Borg (H)
- 1896–1897: Christian Lommerud (V)
- 1898–1898: H. Østmoe (V)
- 1899–1904: H.G. Kveseth (H)
- 1905–1907: Gustav Kirkemo
- 1908–1916: Lauritz Kluge
- 1917–1919: Arne Hauger (Ap)
- 1920–1922: Asbjørn Kluge (V)
- 1922–1925: Arne Hauger (Ap)
- 1925–1929: Harald Hunsager (Bp)
- 1929–1931: Marius Mathisen (Ap)
- 1932–1944: Kristian Råberget (LL/NS)
- 1945–1945: Arne Aanstad (NS)
- 1945–1959: Kåre Torp (Ap)
- 1959–1963: Thorstein Haugen (Ap)

== See also ==
- List of former municipalities of Norway
