= David Enskog =

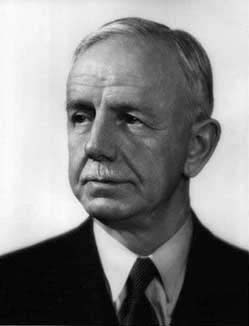

David Enskog (22 April 1884, Västra Ämtervik, Sunne – 1 June 1947, Stockholm) was a Swedish mathematical physicist. Enskog helped develop the kinetic theory of gases by extending the Maxwell–Boltzmann equations.

== Biography ==
After undergraduate studies at Uppsala University he received a licentiate degree in physics in 1911, working on gas diffusion under professor Gustaf Granqvist, who was an experimentalist. Enskog did not wish to continue with experimental physics, however, and transferred to professor Carl Wilhelm Oseen for his Ph.D. From 1913, Enskog worked as a high school teacher in mathematics and physics to support himself and his family, while continuing his research and thesis writing in his free time. In 1917 he completed his thesis on kinetic theory of gases at Uppsala. As his thesis was considered obscure and difficult to grasp, he received a rather mediocre grade on it, which did not qualify him to become a docent, which was the essential next step in a Swedish academic career.

Enskog therefore continued to work as a high school teacher, but contacted Sydney Chapman, who had worked on the same problems as Enskog. Already in 1917, Chapman recognised the importance of Enskog's work. In the 1920s Enskog's contributions to the kinetic theory of gases became more recognised. In 1929, Enskog tried to make a comeback into the academic world by applying for two professorships in Stockholm, one in mechanics and mathematical physics at Stockholm University College and one in mathematics and mechanics at the Royal Institute of Technology (KTH). Enskog did not get the professorship at the University College, and the selection committee at KTH was divided and leaning towards Hilding Faxén until Chapman, on a visit to Sweden, voiced strong support for Enskog and wrote a letter of recommendation on his behalf. Finally, Enskog was appointed professor at KTH on 12 December 1930. As a KTH professor, Enskog mainly got caught up in teaching duties, and did not do much further research.

The fusion of Chapman's and Enskog's theories later became known as the Chapman–Enskog method for solving the Boltzmann equation. In a 1939 book called The Mathematical Theory of Non-Uniform Gases, written by Chapman and Thomas Cowling and dedicated to David Enskog, the authors expanded this theory under the Chapman-Enskog designation.

Further recognition of Enskog's work came in 1945, when the Smyth Report on the US atomic weapons project was published. Chapman and Enskog were mentioned as the discoverers of thermal diffusion, which was one of the methods used to enrich uranium 235 for the first nuclear weapons. Enskog was the only Swedish scientist mentioned in this report.

Enskog was elected to the Royal Swedish Academy of Engineering Sciences in 1941, and finally to the Royal Swedish Academy of Sciences on 28 May 1947, only days before his death.
