= Norsälven =

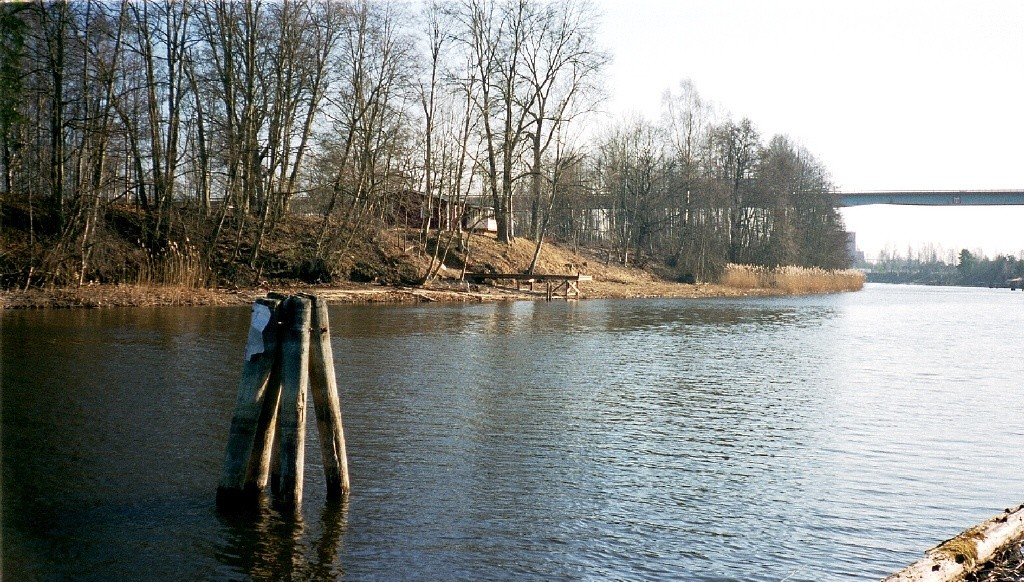
- Norsälven at Älvenäs

Location
- Country: Sweden
- County: Värmland

Physical characteristics
- Source: Fryken
  - elevation: 62 m (203 ft)
- Mouth: Vänern
  - coordinates: 59°21′50″N 13°11′10″E
  - elevation: 44 m (144 ft)
- Length: 180 km (110 mi)
- Basin size: 4,160 km^{2} (1,610 sq mi)
- Discharge
  - average: 56 m^{3}/s (2,000 cu ft/s)
  - maximum: 192 m^{3}/s (6,800 cu ft/s)

Basin features
- Tributaries
  - left: Rottnan, Röjdan
  - right: Ljusnan River

Norsälven (Swedish pronunciation: [ˈnûːʂˌɛlːvɛn]) is a river flowing between Fryken and Vänern in Värmland, Sweden. It used to be an important river for log driving. During the 1950s, there were 6.23 million logs annually floating in the river. The length is 28 km (including Ljusnan River, 179 km).
