= Fryken =

Chain of three lakes in Värmland, Sweden

Coordinates: 59°43′40.883″N 13°10′11.50″E

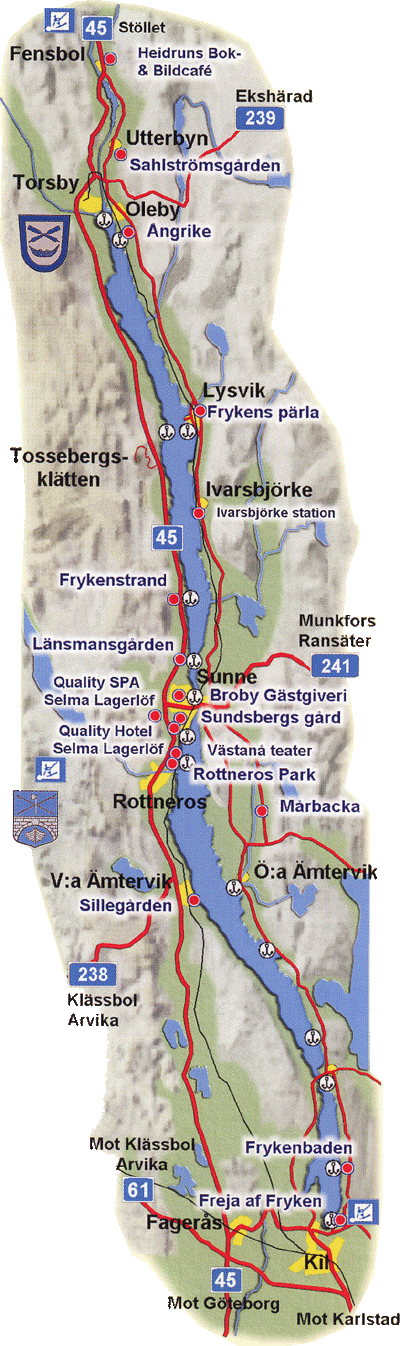
Fryken valley

Fryken (Swedish pronunciation: [ˈfry̌ːkɛn]) is a chain of three lakes in Värmland, Sweden: Upper, Middle and Lower Fryken. The lakes are separated by two sounds, Sunnesundet and Nilsbysundet. The total length of Fryken is 80 km, but it is only 3 km wide at the widest part. The maximum depth is 120 meters and it is located at 62 meters above sea level. Fryken is drained by Norsälven.

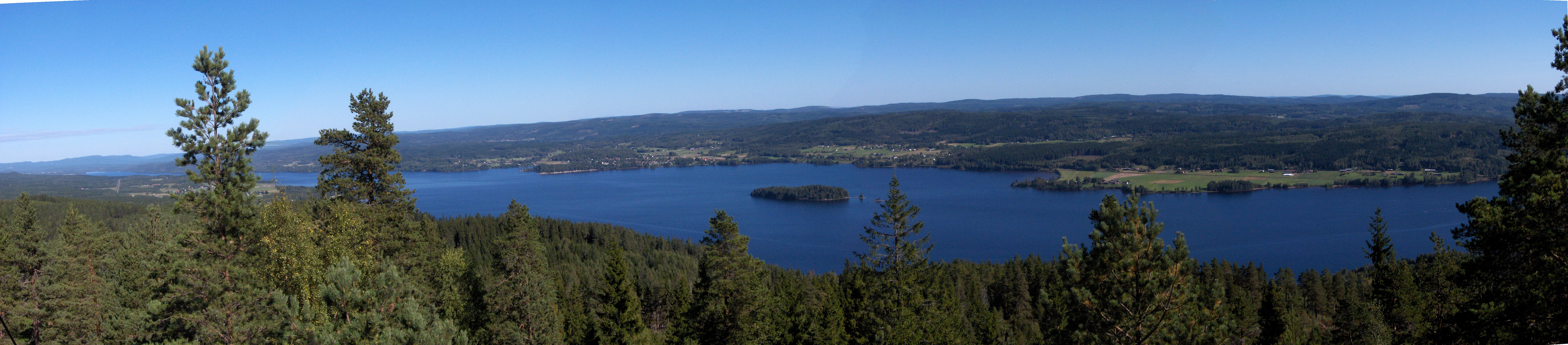
Upper Fryken

== Upper Fryken (Övre Fryken) ==
The locality Torsby is situated at the north end of Upper Fryken with the main tributary Ljusnan and the smaller river Röjdån.

The football manager Sven-Göran Eriksson owned a country house at the south-east side of Upper Fryken until his death in 2024.

The locality Sunne is situated in the south at the sound between Upper Fryken and Middle Fryken.

== Middle Fryken (Mellan-Fryken) ==
The locality Rottneros is situated in the north-west of Middle Fryken as well as the largest tributary Rottnan. Middle Fryken separates the localities Östra Ämtervik and Västra Ämtervik.

The Nobel Prize in Literature winner Selma Lagerlöf is buried in Östra Ämtervik.

== Lower Fryken (Nedre Fryken) ==
The sound Nilsbysundet, separates Middle Fryken from Lower Fryken. The locality Kil is situated near the south end of Lower Fryken. Lower Fryken is drained in the south-west by Norsälven down to Lake Vänern.
