= Rottnan =

Rottnan (Swedish) Rotna (Norwegian)
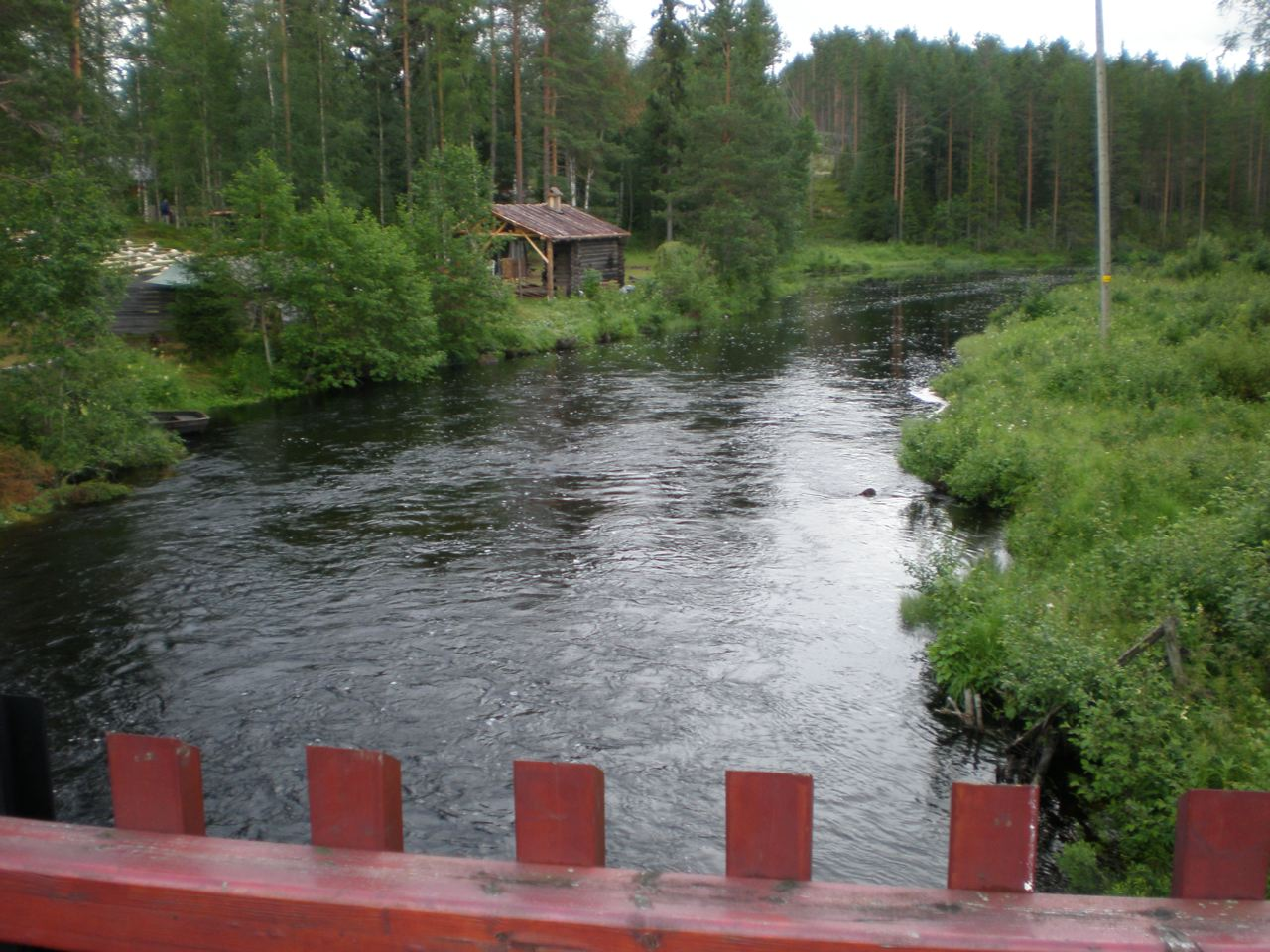
- River Rotna in Svullrya, Norway
- Interactive map of the lake

Location
- Countries: Norway, Sweden
- Counties: Innlandet, Värmland
- Municipalities: Åsnes, Grue, Torsby, Sunne

Physical characteristics
- Source: Lake Helveteskjelda
  - location: Åsnes, Norway
  - coordinates: 60.55034°N 12.4229°E
  - elevation: 520 metres (1,710 ft)
- Mouth: Lake Mellan-Fryken
  - location: Rottneros, Sweden
  - coordinates: 59.793310°N 13.129954°E
  - elevation: 62 metres (203 ft)
- Length: 110 km (68 mi)
- Basin size: 960 km^{2} (370 sq mi)
- Discharge
  - average: 12.9 m^{3}/s (460 cu ft/s)
  - maximum: 63 m^{3}/s (2,200 cu ft/s)

Rottnan (Swedish) or Rotna (Norwegian) is a 110-kilometre (68 mi) long river in Norway and Sweden. The river starts south of the Hof Finnskog Church in Solør, Norway and discharges into lake Mellan-Fryken at Rottneros in Värmland, Sweden. The main river begins at the Rundtjern, but that lake is fed by several streams and small lakes on and surrounding the Evensbergklinten and Husuberget mountains. The highest source is the small lake Helveteskjelda, at an elevation of 520 metres (1,710 ft) above sea level. The river passes through the municipalities of Åsnes and Grue in Innlandet county, Norway and through the municipalities of Torsby and Sunne in Värmland County, Sweden.

Rottnan used to have three waterfalls close to the mouth in Fryken. Rottnafallet was the last and tallest at 26 metres (85 ft) height. The waterfalls were built in 1927 for hydroelectric power. The name Rottnan comes from the old Swedish word Rotn which means "the roaring".

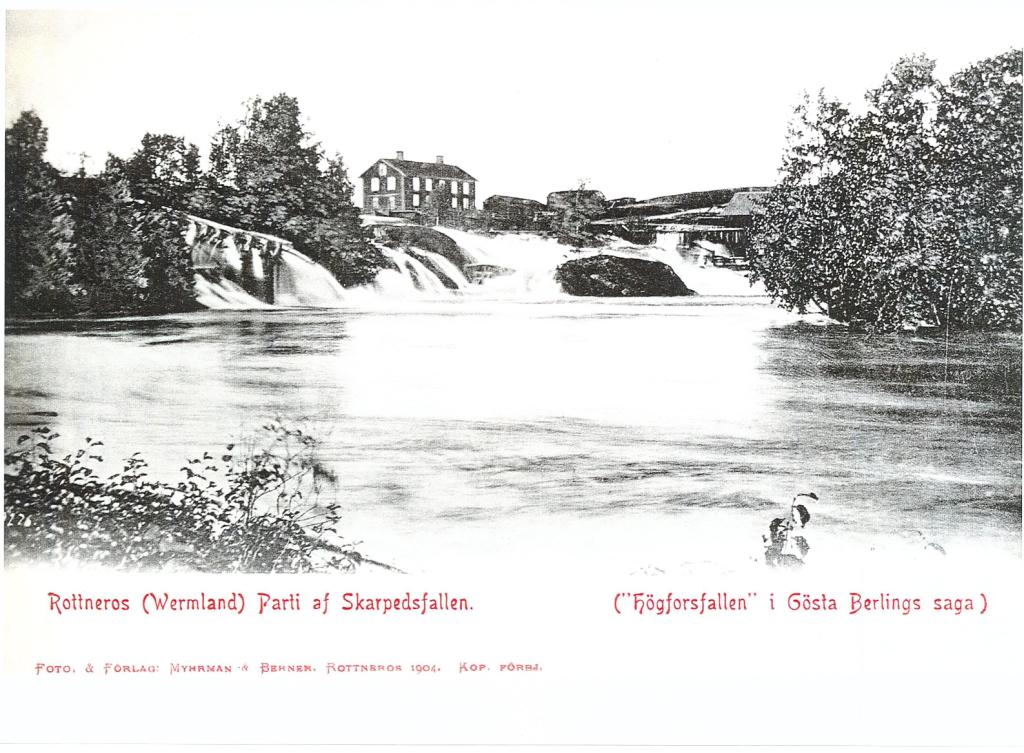
The waterfall Skarpedsfallet in Rottneros, Sweden

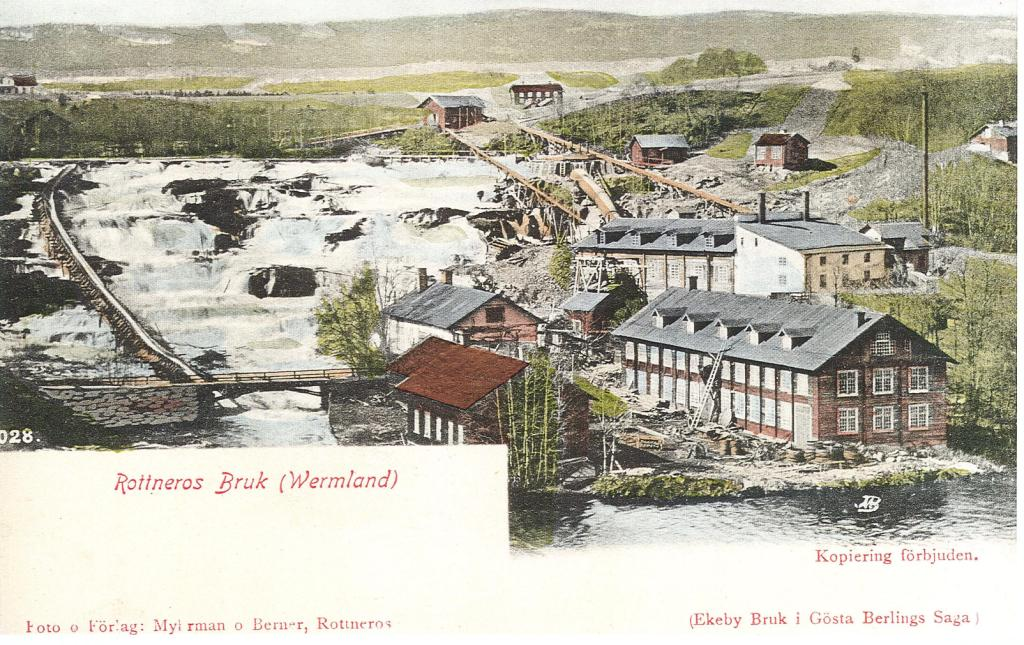
The waterfall Rottnafallet and the pulp mill Rottneros bruk in Rottneros, Sweden

== See also ==
- List of rivers in Norway
