= Uddheden =

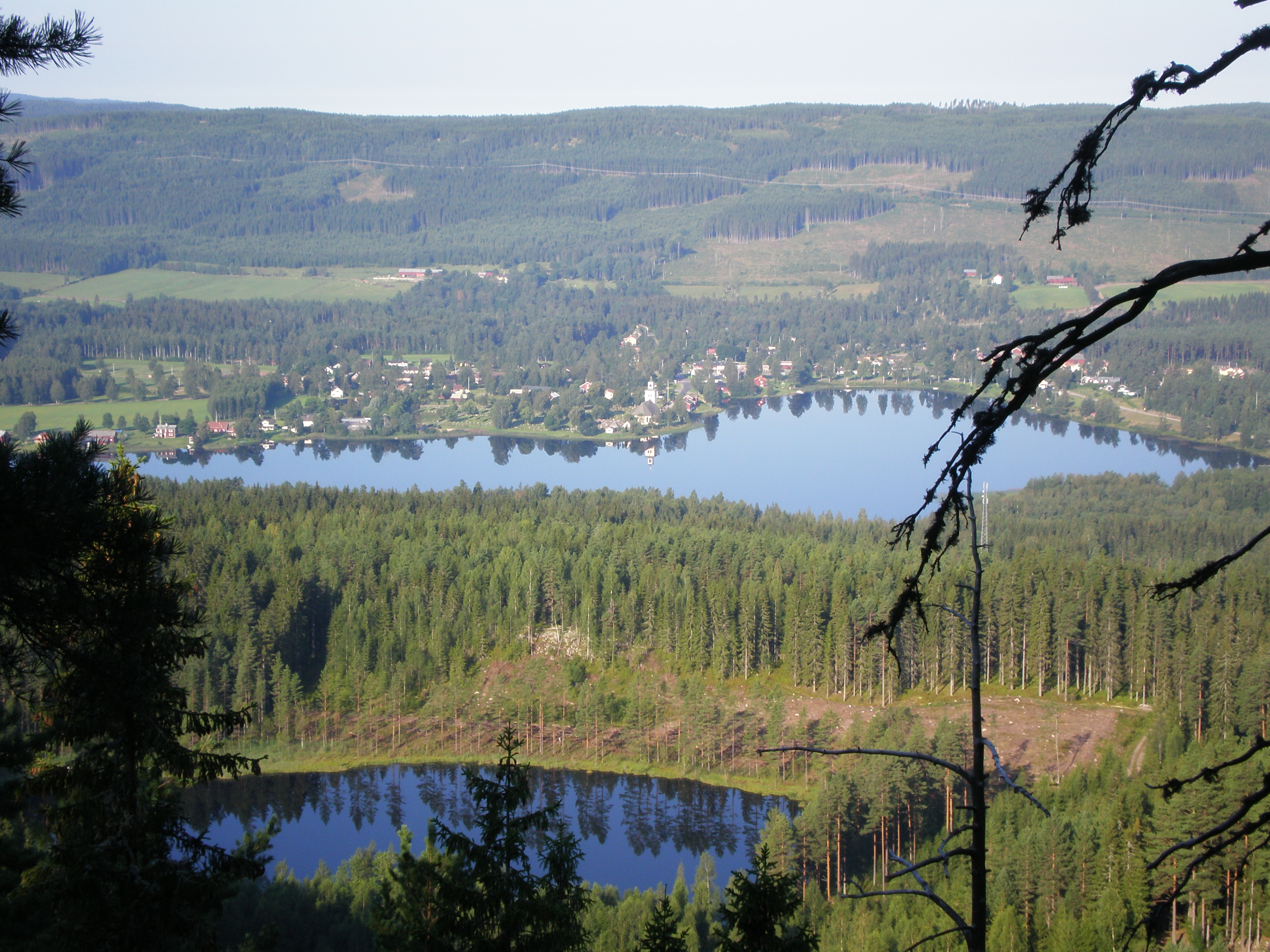
- View of Uddheden and Gräsmark church

- Location within Sweden
- Coordinates: 59°57′N 12°54′E
- Country: Sweden
- Province: Värmland
- County: Värmland County
- Municipality: Sunne Municipality

Area
  - Total: 0.74 km^{2} (0.29 sq mi)

Population (31 December 2010)
  - Total: 258
  - Density: 349/km^{2} (900/sq mi)
- Time zone: UTC+1 (CET)
  - Summer (DST): UTC+2 (CEST)

Uddheden is a locality situated in Sunne Municipality, Värmland County, Sweden with 258 inhabitants in 2010.
