= Rottneros =

- Location within Sweden
- Coordinates: 59°48′N 13°07′E
- Country: Sweden
- Province: Värmland
- County: Värmland County
- Municipality: Sunne Municipality

Area
  - Total: 1.58 km^{2} (0.61 sq mi)

Population (31 December 2010)
  - Total: 448
  - Density: 283/km^{2} (730/sq mi)
- Time zone: UTC+1 (CET)
  - Summer (DST): UTC+2 (CEST)

Rottneros (Swedish pronunciation: [rɔtnɛrˈuːs]) is a locality situated in Sunne Municipality, Värmland County, Sweden with 448 inhabitants as of 2010. Rottneros means "roaring river mouth" in old Swedish. The river Rottnan used to have three waterfalls close to the discharge into lake Fryken. The waterfalls were built in 1927 for hydroelectric power.
