= Hof, Åsnes =

Village in Åsnes Municipality, Norway

Hof
- Village
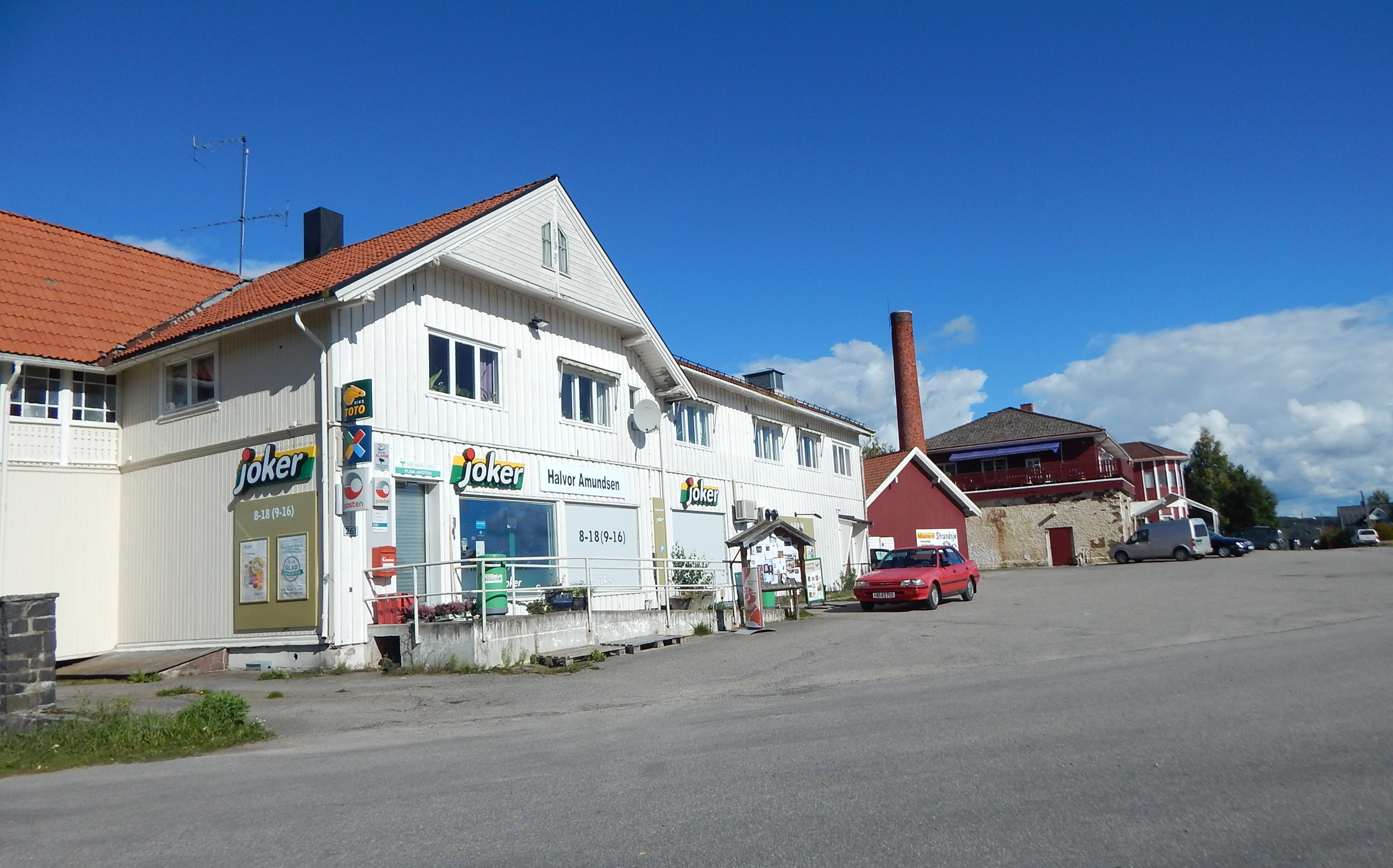
- View of the village centre
- Interactive map of Hof
- Location within Innlandet Location within Norway
- Coordinates: 60.55275°N 12.02188°E
- Country: Norway
- Region: Eastern Norway
- County: Innlandet
- District: Solør
- Municipality: Åsnes Municipality
- Elevation: 155 m (509 ft)
- Time zone: UTC+01:00 (CET)
  - Summer (DST): UTC+02:00 (CEST)
- Post Code: 2266 Arneberg

Hof is a village in Åsnes Municipality in Innlandet county, Norway. The village is located on the west shore of the river Glomma, about 8 kilometres (5.0 mi) south of the village of Flisa. The village sits in a fairly flat agricultural area. Hof is also a parish within the municipality, based at the local Hof Church.

== History ==
The historic Hof Church (whose name refers to an heathen temple) has been located in this village for centuries. The church and village area of Hof are located on the west side of the river Glomma, although the river actually changed course in the area around the year 1450. Previously the church was on the east side before the river broke through its boundaries and changed course, going the other way around the village and leaving an oxbow lake at the former site of the river.

Hof was the administrative centre of the old Hof Municipality which existed from 1838 to 1963.

== Media gallery ==
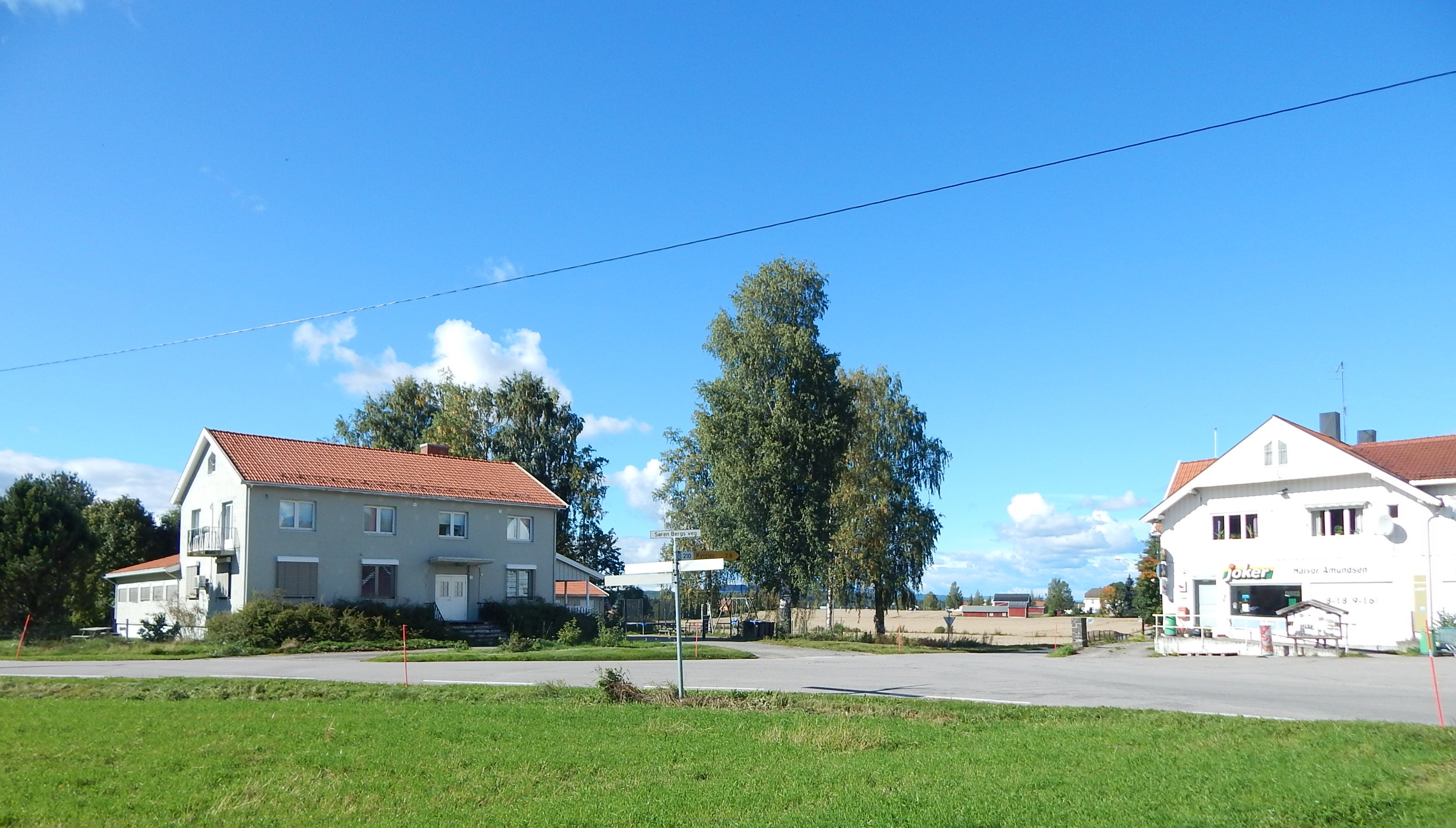

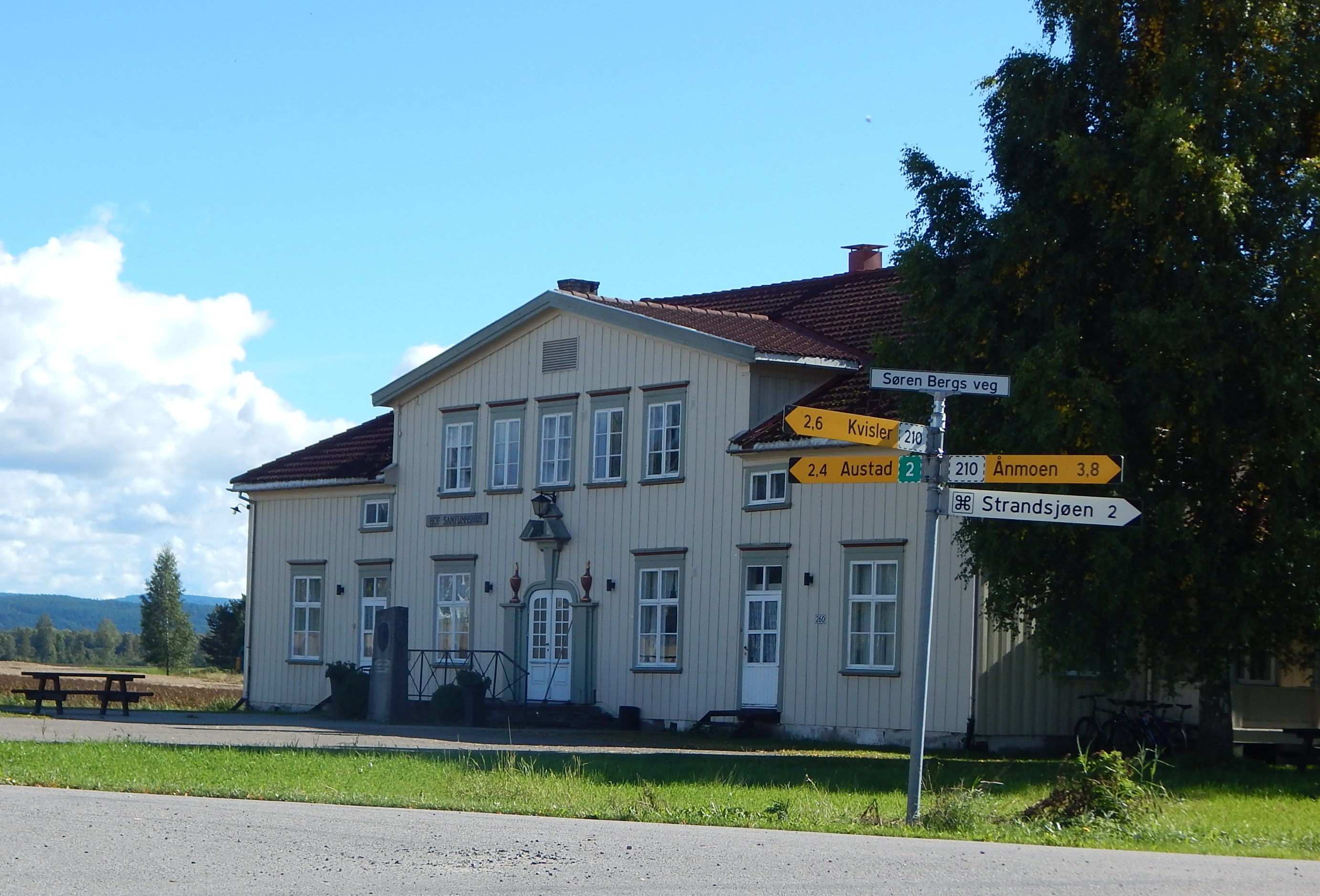

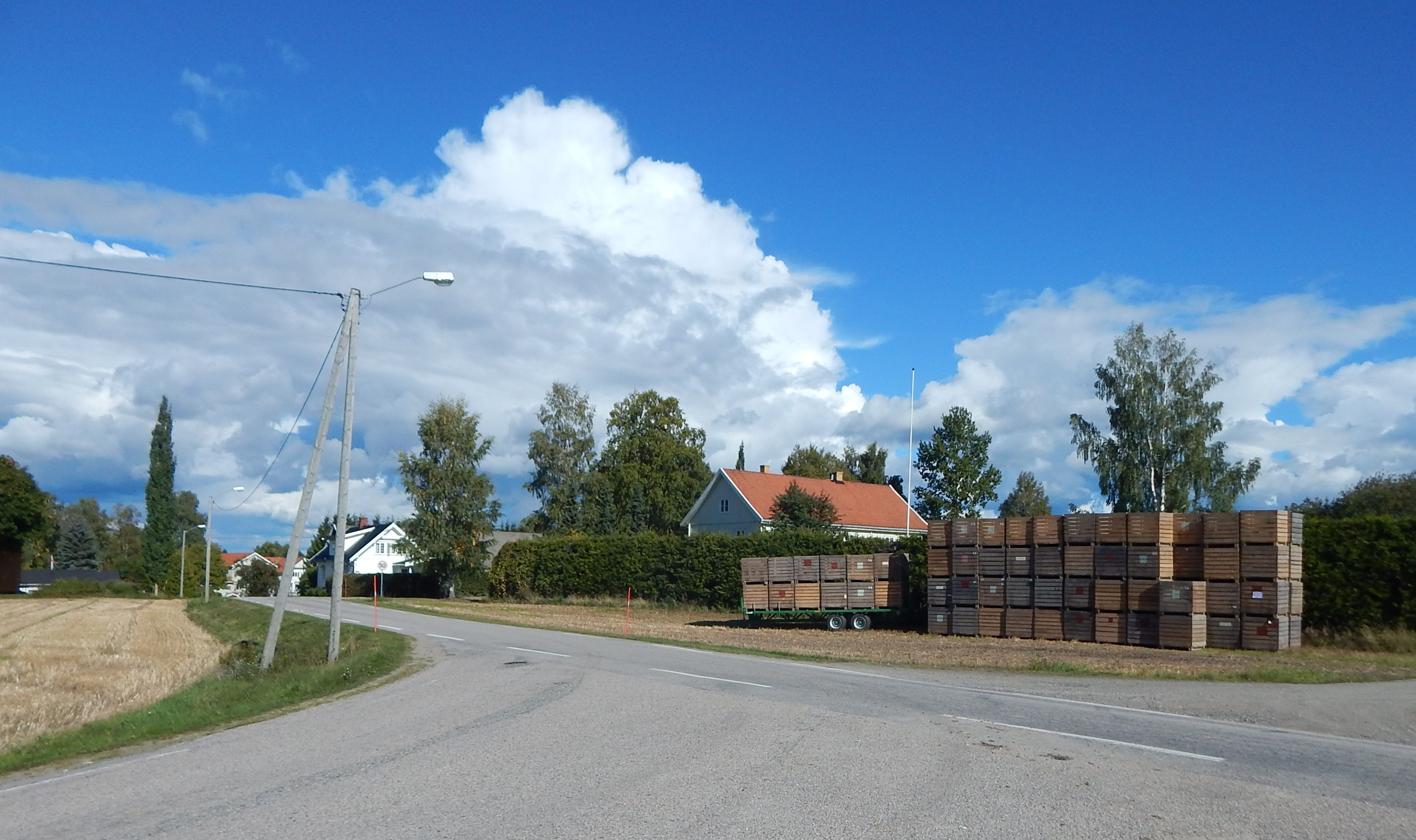

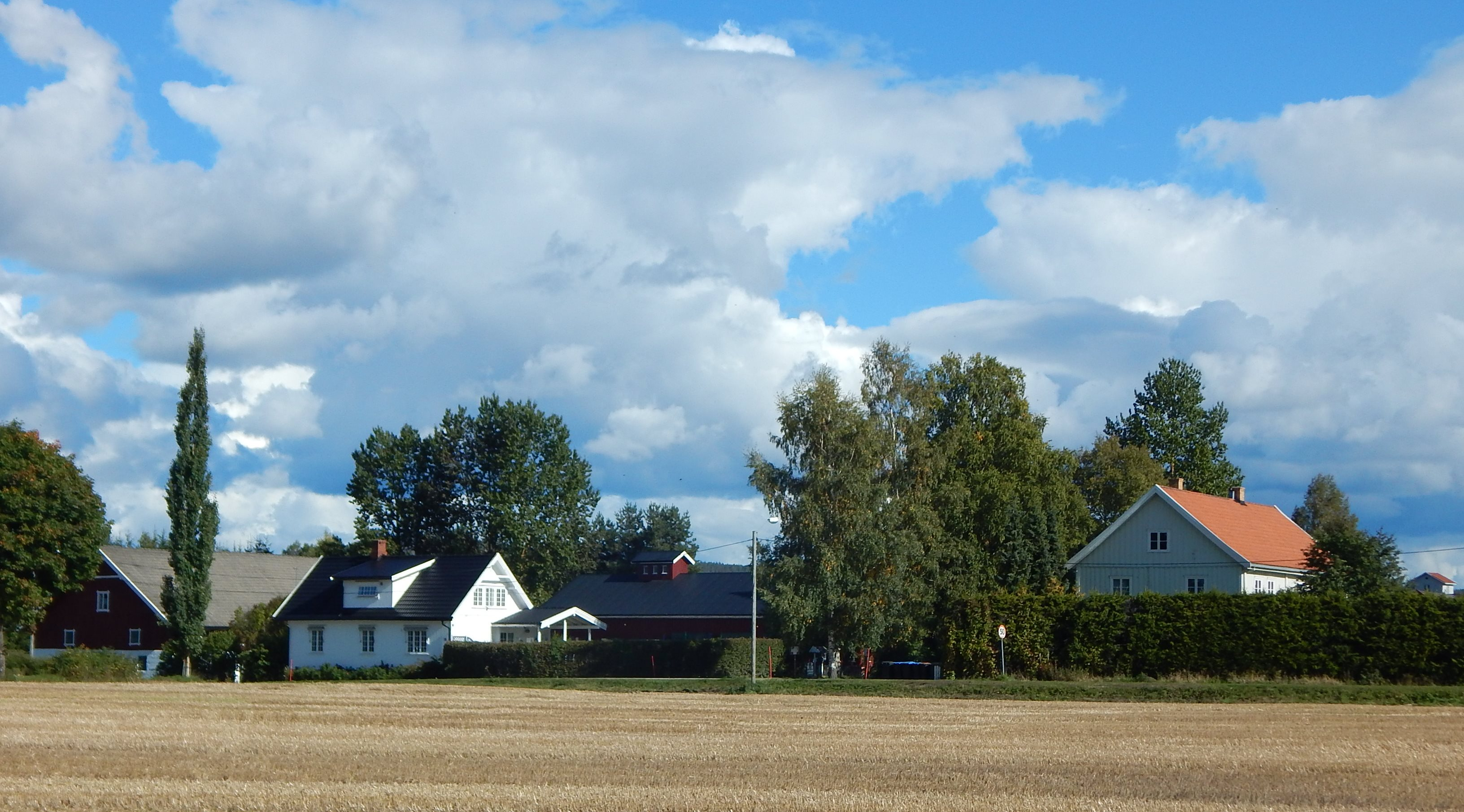

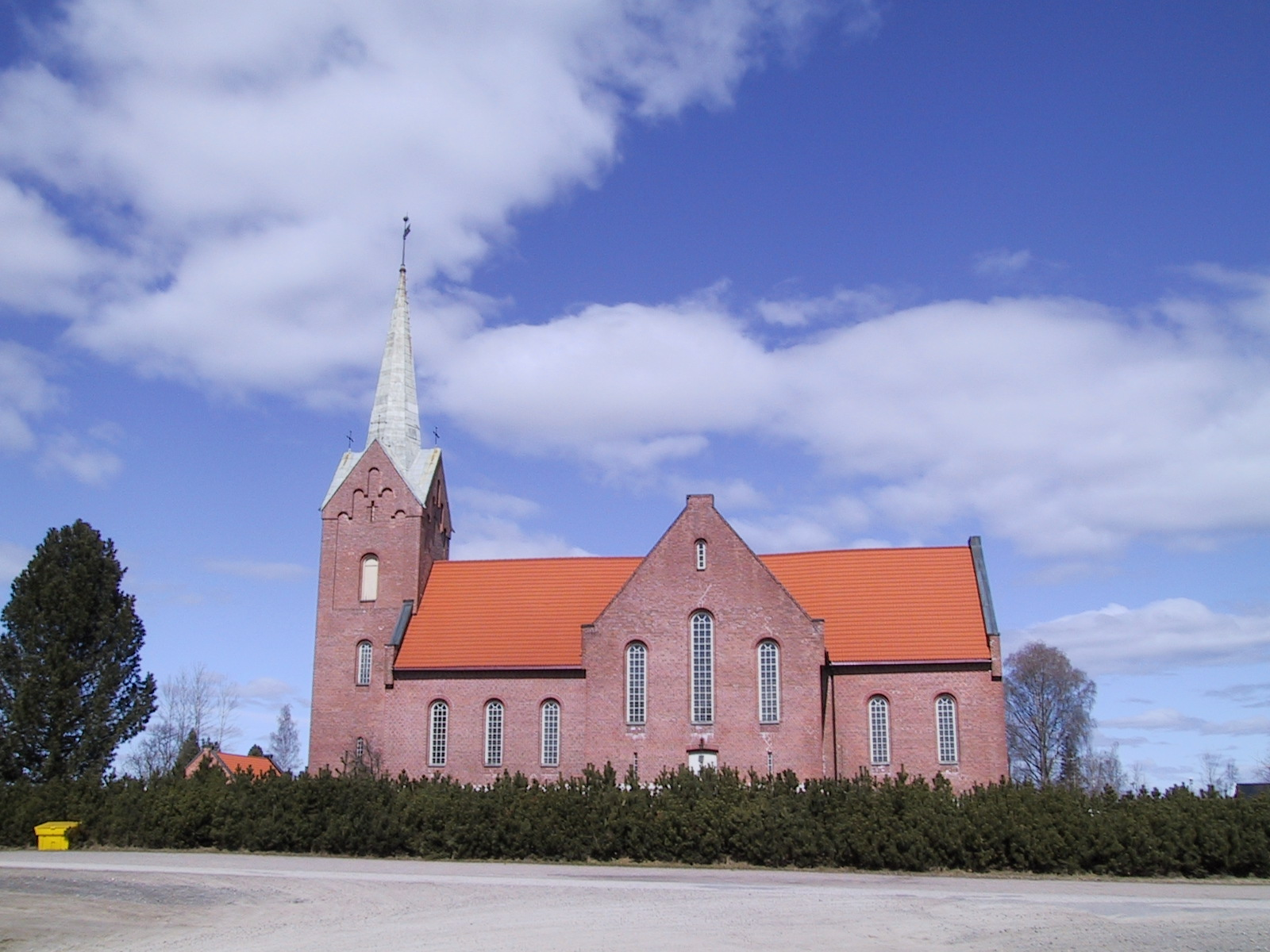
