= Arneberg Church =

Church in Innlandet, Norway

- Arneberg kirke
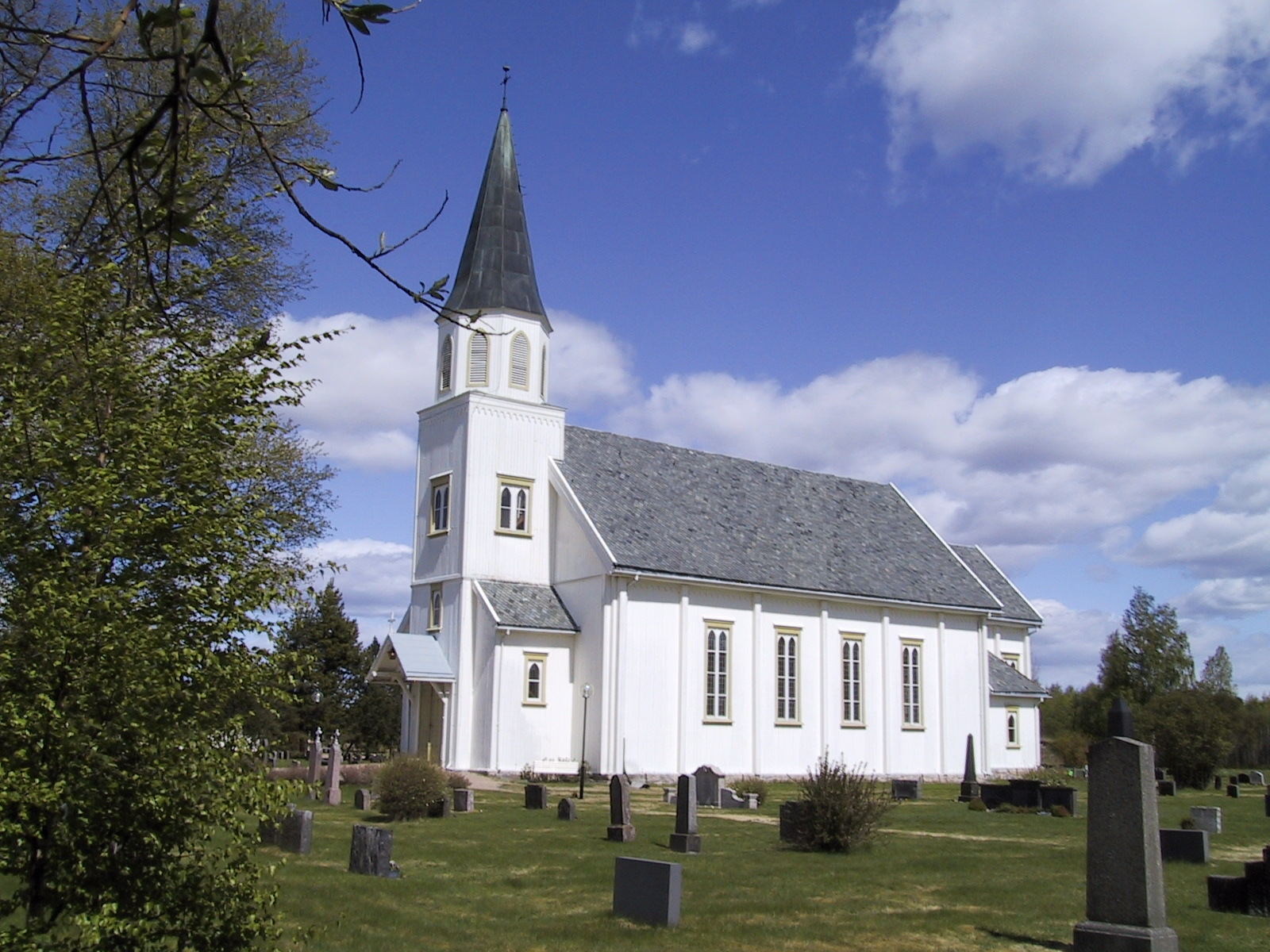
- View of the church
- Arneberg Church
- 60°34′04″N 12°03′30″E
- Location: Åsnes Municipality, Innlandet
- Country: Norway
- Denomination: Church of Norway
- Churchmanship: Evangelical Lutheran

History
- Status: Parish church
- Founded: 1878
- Consecrated: 9 October 1878

Architecture
- Functional status: Active
- Architect: Henrik Nissen
- Architectural type: Long church
- Completed: 1878 (148 years ago)

Specifications
- Capacity: 350
- Materials: Wood

Administration
- Diocese: Hamar bispedømme
- Deanery: Solør, Vinger og Odal prosti
- Parish: Arneberg
- Norwegian Cultural Heritage Site
- Type: Church
- Status: Not protected
- ID: 83794

Arneberg Church (Norwegian: Arneberg kirke) is a parish church of the Church of Norway in Åsnes Municipality in Innlandet county, Norway. It is located at Arneberg, just north of Jammerdal. It is the church for the Arneberg parish which is part of the Solør, Vinger og Odal prosti (deanery) in the Diocese of Hamar. The white, wooden church was built in a long church design in 1878 using plans drawn up by the architect Johannes Henrik Nissen. The church seats about 350 people.

== History ==
For centuries, the people of southern Åsnes were part of the Hof Church parish. The church sat on the west side of the river Glomma, but many parishioners lived on the east side of the river and had to cross the river to attend their church. On 8 October 1871, three children drowned while crossing the river on their way to confirmation class at the church. After the accident, there was intense local pressure to build an annex chapel on the east side of the river. Land was given by Einar Christiansen Arneberg, and the chapel was built with volunteers and donations. Henrik Nissen from Kristiania designed the new chapel (it was one of his first church buildings that he designed) and Nils Nilsen Hunsager and Günther Schüssler were the main builders. Construction took place in 1878 and the chapel was consecrated on 9 October 1878. Just after the turn of the 20th century, the exterior walls were covered with paneled siding (before that time the log walls were uncovered). More recently, the chapel was upgraded in status to a parish church and it was renamed Arneberg Church.

== Media gallery ==
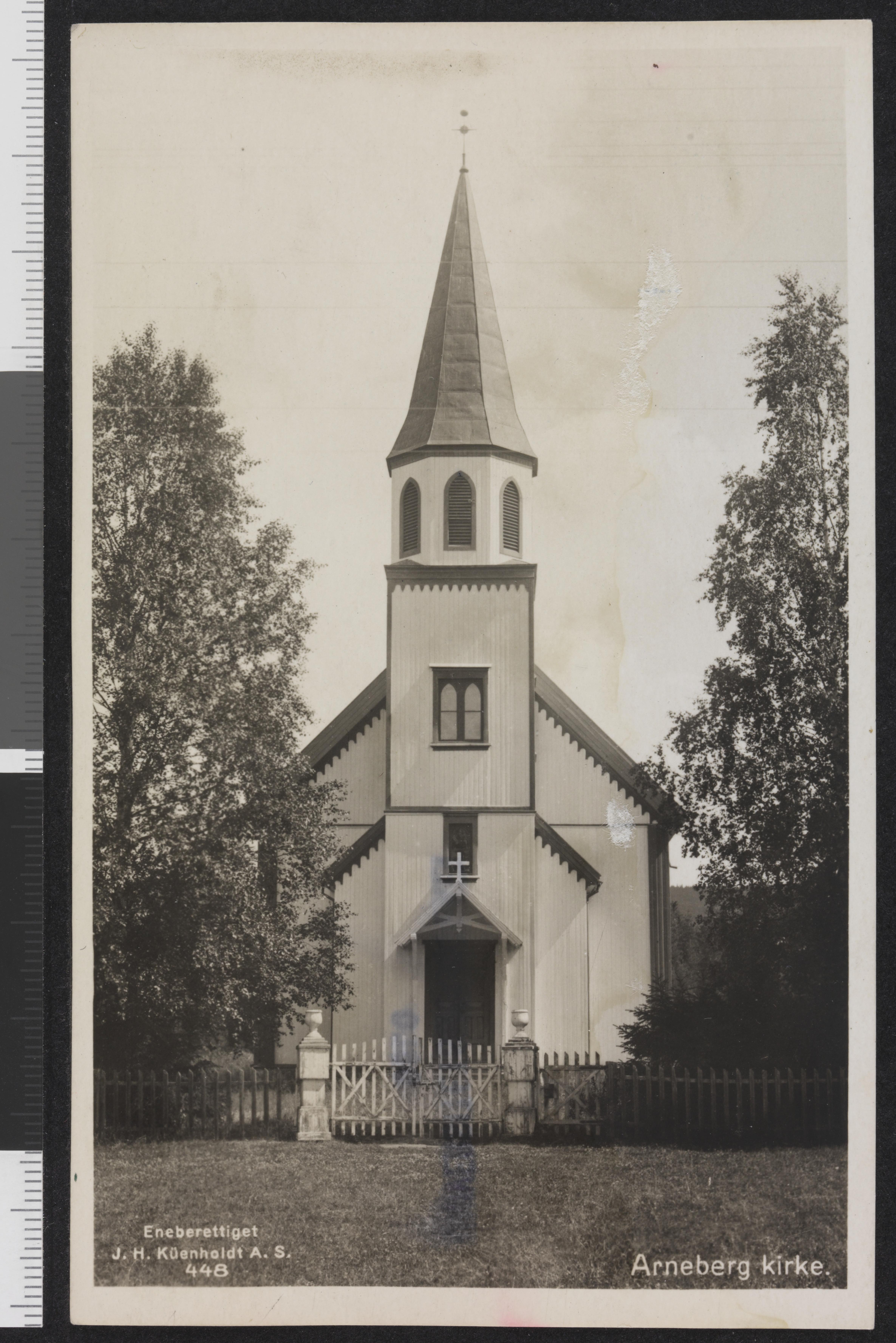

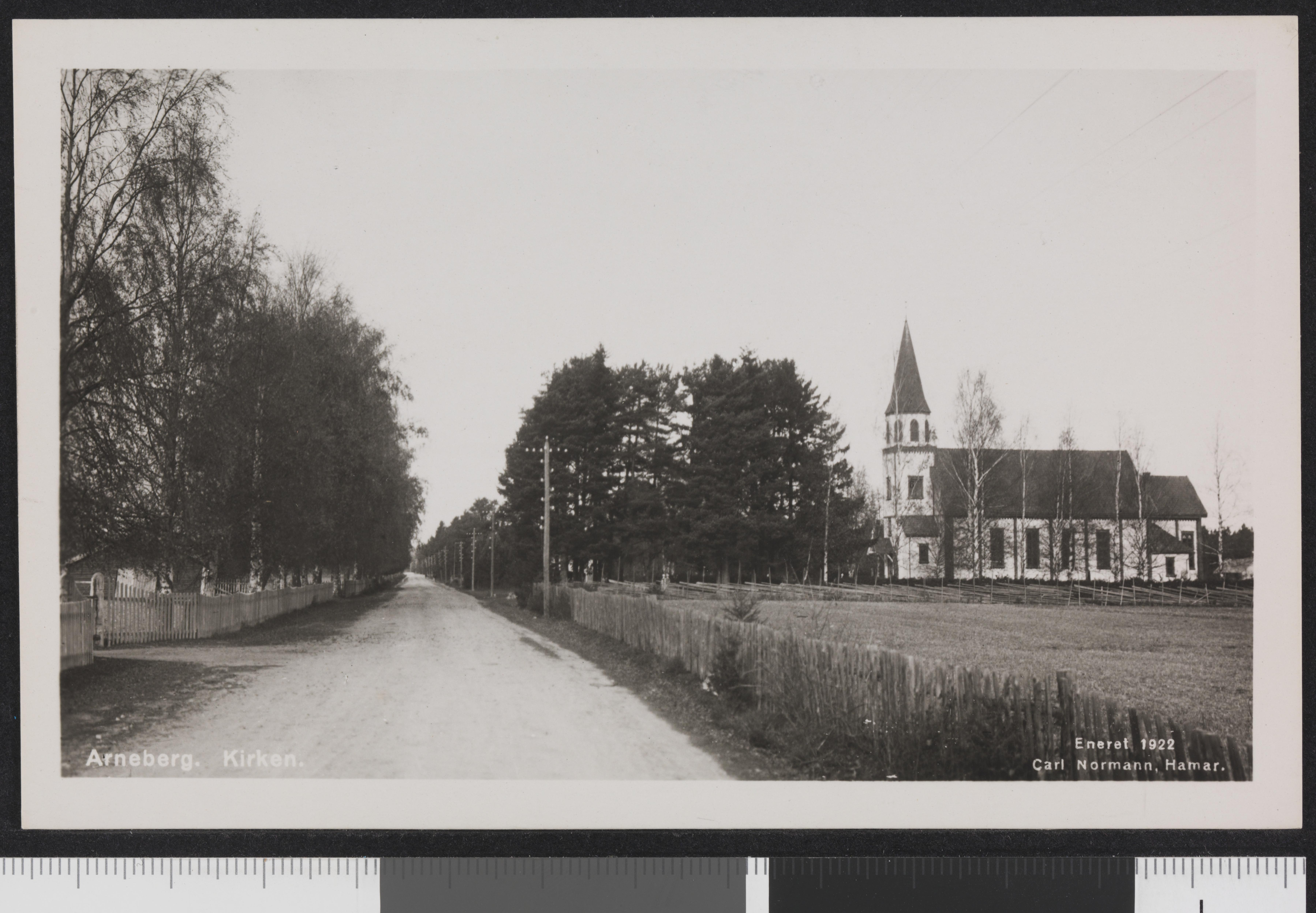

== See also ==
- List of churches in Hamar
