= Ljusnan River (Värmland) =

River in Värmland, Sweden

Coordinates: 61.21862°N 17.06235°E

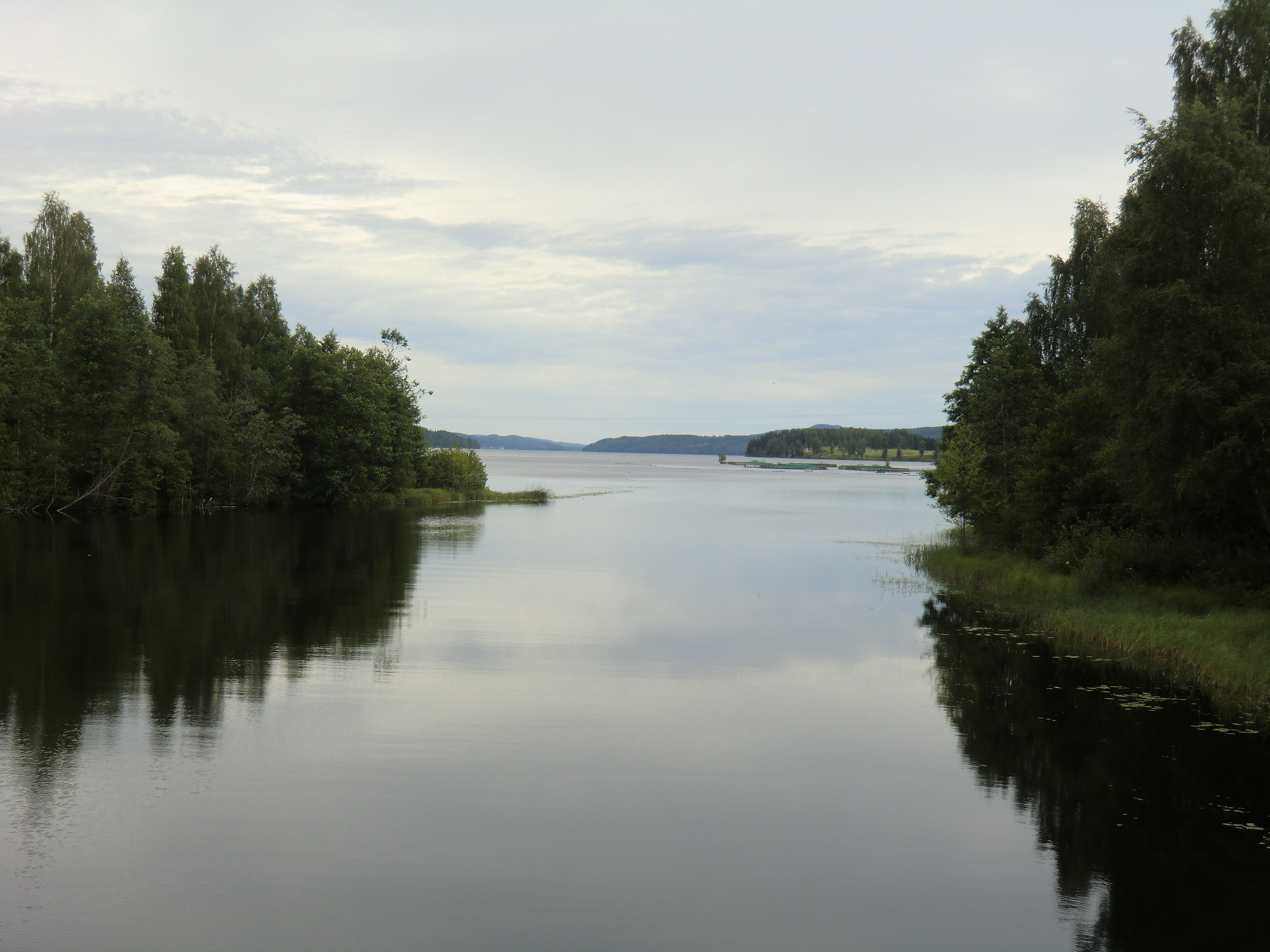
Ljusnan's discharge into lake Fryken.

Ljusnan is a forest river in Northern Värmland, Sweden. The river spring is near the Norwegian border. It has a total length of 430 km (270 mi).
