= Hof Finnskog Church =

Church in Innlandet, Norway

- Hof Finnskog kirke
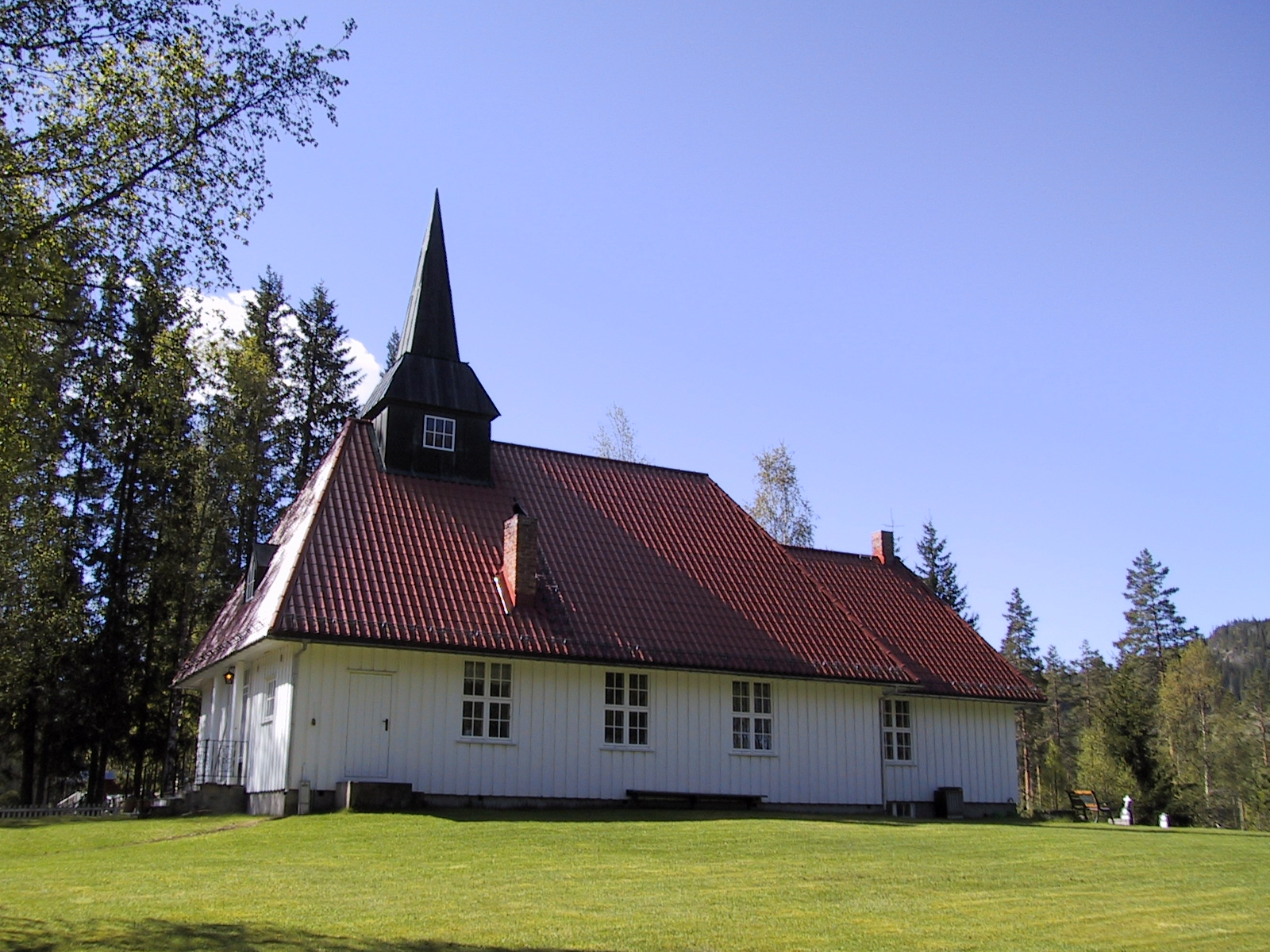
- View of the church
- Hof Finnskog Church
- 60°34′36″N 12°20′17″E
- Location: Åsnes Municipality, Innlandet
- Country: Norway
- Denomination: Church of Norway
- Churchmanship: Evangelical Lutheran

History
- Former name: Dulpetorpet kapell
- Status: Parish church
- Founded: 1877
- Consecrated: 1953

Architecture
- Functional status: Active
- Architect: Riksarkitekten
- Architectural type: Long church
- Completed: 1953 (73 years ago)

Specifications
- Capacity: 100
- Materials: Wood

Administration
- Diocese: Hamar bispedømme
- Deanery: Solør, Vinger og Odal prosti
- Parish: Hof Finnskog
- Norwegian Cultural Heritage Site
- Type: Church
- Status: Not protected
- ID: 84591

Hof Finnskog Church (Norwegian: Hof Finnskog kirke) is a parish church of the Church of Norway in Åsnes Municipality in Innlandet county, Norway. It is located in the village of Dulpetorpet. It is the church for the Hof Finnskog parish which is part of the Solør, Vinger og Odal prosti (deanery) in the Diocese of Hamar. The white, wooden church was built in a long church design in 1953 using plans drawn up by the National Architect (Norwegian: Riksarkitekten). The church seats about 100 people.

== History ==
In 1877, an old school building was consecrated as a chapel to serve the Finnskogen area in the Hof Church parish. This was called the Dulpetorpet Chapel. After World War II was over, plans were made to build a larger church in Dulpetorpet. The National Architect (Norwegian: Riksarkitekten) provided designs for the building and it was to be a wooden long church. The new church was built and consecrated in 1953. Some of the interior furnishings including the pulpit were transferred to the new building from the medieval Hof Church.

== See also ==
- List of churches in Hamar
