= Västra Ämtervik =

- Location within Sweden
- Coordinates: 59°44′N 13°08′E
- Country: Sweden
- Province: Värmland
- County: Värmland County
- Municipality: Sunne Municipality

Area
  - Total: 1.08 km^{2} (0.42 sq mi)

Population (31 December 2010)
  - Total: 366
  - Density: 338/km^{2} (880/sq mi)
- Time zone: UTC+1 (CET)
  - Summer (DST): UTC+2 (CEST)

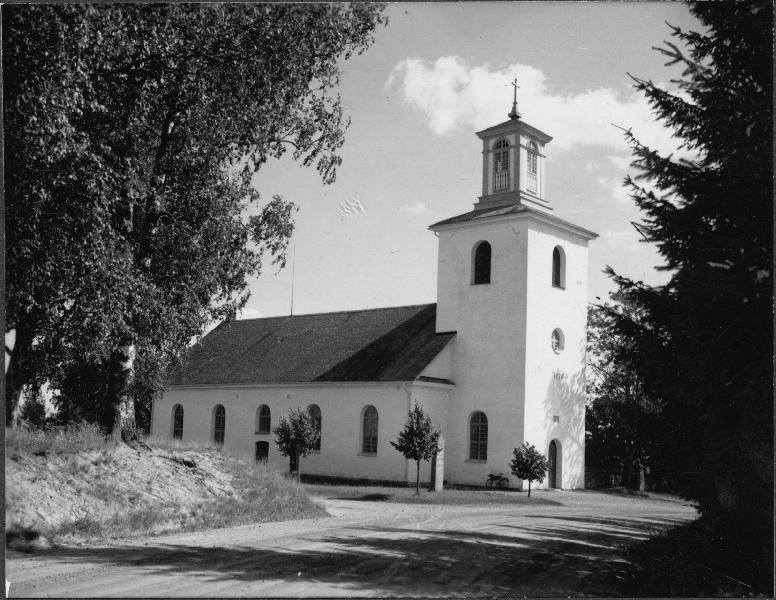
Västra Ämtervik Church

Västra Ämtervik is a locality situated in Sunne Municipality, Värmland County, Sweden with 366 inhabitants in 2010.
