= Sunne Municipality =

Sunne Municipality Sunne kommun
- Municipality
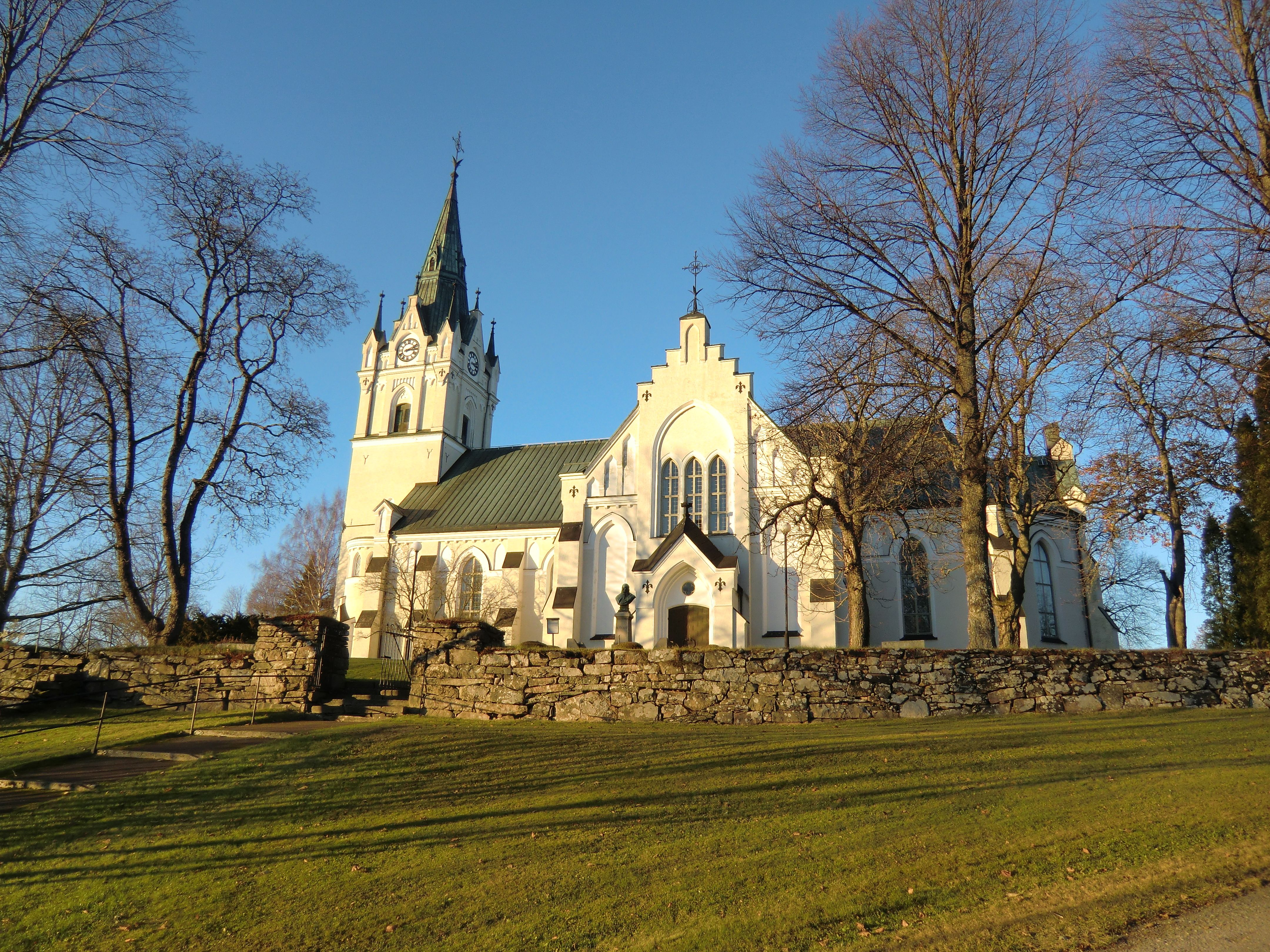
- Sunne church in Värmland, Sweden

- Coat of arms

- Coordinates: 59°50′N 13°08′E
- Country: Sweden
- County: Värmland County
- Seat: Sunne

Area
  - Total: 1,448.25 km^{2} (559.17 sq mi)
  - Land: 1,288.11 km^{2} (497.34 sq mi)
  - Water: 160.14 km^{2} (61.83 sq mi)
- Area as of 1 January 2014.

Population (30 June 2025)
  - Total: 13,352
  - Density: 10.366/km^{2} (26.847/sq mi)
- Time zone: UTC+1 (CET)
  - Summer (DST): UTC+2 (CEST)
- ISO 3166 code: SE
- Province: Värmland
- Municipal code: 1766
- Website: www.sunne.se

Sunne Municipality (Swedish: Sunne kommun) is a municipality in Värmland County in west central Sweden. Its seat is located in the town of Sunne.

The present municipality was created in 1971 when the market town (köping) Sunne (instituted in 1920) was amalgamated with Gräsmark and Lysvik.

== Localities ==
- Lysvik
- Mårbacka
- Rottneros
- Sunne (seat)
- Uddheden
- Västra Ämtervik

Karlstad, which has an international airport, is the nearest large city.

== Demographics ==
This is a demographic table based on Sunne Municipality's electoral districts in the 2022 Swedish general election sourced from SVT's election platform, in turn taken from SCB official statistics.

In total there were 13,352 inhabitants, with 10,393 Swedish citizens of voting age. 44.0% voted for the left coalition and 54.8% for the right coalition. Indicators are in percentage points except population totals and income.

Location	Residents	Citizen adults	Left vote	Right vote	Employed	Swedish parents	Foreign heritage	Income SEK	Degree
Location			%	%					
Brobyäng	1,326	1,023	48.2	51.3	77	85	15	20,908	29
Gräsmark	1,209	923	47.0	51.3	79	88	12	22,211	29
Klockaregården	1,681	1,253	44.1	54.4	71	84	16	23,102	28
Leran	1,607	1,291	45.8	53.0	78	83	17	23,726	32
Lysvik	1,285	990	49.6	49.8	84	91	9	23,979	34
Rottneros	805	648	39.0	60.2	82	89	11	26,517	29
Stöpafors	748	578	40.3	59.1	83	95	5	23,606	25
Södra Borgeby	1,525	1,189	39.5	59.2	84	91	9	25,945	32
Västra Ämtervik	1,024	787	45.5	53.2	84	92	8	25,484	36
Åmberg	1,337	1,055	42.8	57.1	80	92	8	25,168	32
Östra Ämtervik	805	656	42.0	56.5	84	92	8	24,212	39
Source: SVT
