= Hof Church =

Church in Innlandet, Norway

- Hof kirke
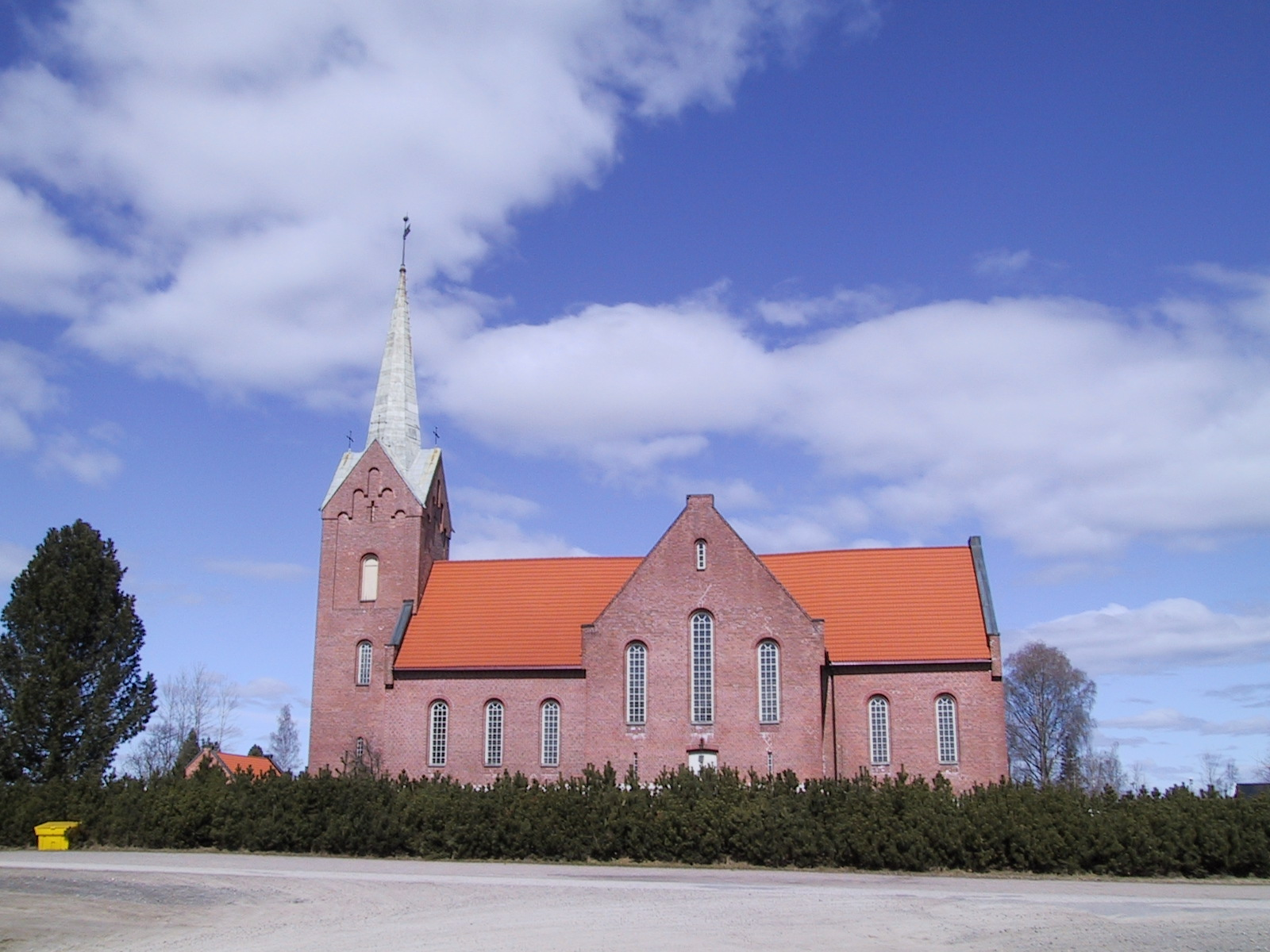
- View of the church
- Hof Church
- 60°33′04″N 12°01′04″E
- Location: Åsnes Municipality, Innlandet
- Country: Norway
- Denomination: Church of Norway
- Previous denomination: Catholic Church
- Churchmanship: Evangelical Lutheran

History
- Status: Parish church
- Founded: 13th century
- Consecrated: 17 October 1860

Architecture
- Functional status: Active
- Architect: Christian Heinrich Grosch
- Architectural type: Cruciform
- Completed: 1860 (166 years ago)

Specifications
- Capacity: 600
- Materials: Brick

Administration
- Diocese: Hamar bispedømme
- Deanery: Solør, Vinger og Odal prosti
- Parish: Hof
- Norwegian Cultural Heritage Site
- Type: Church
- Status: Protected
- ID: 84590

Hof Church (Norwegian: Hof kirke) is a parish church of the Church of Norway in Åsnes Municipality in Innlandet county, Norway. It is located in the village of Hof. It is the church for the Hof parish which is part of the Solør, Vinger og Odal prosti (deanery) in the Diocese of Hamar. The red brick church was built in a cruciform design in 1860 using plans drawn up by the architect Christian Heinrich Grosch. The church seats about 600 people.

Hof Church (whose name refers to an heathen temple) serves the southern part of what is now Åsnes municipality in Solør, with a church on the west side of the river Glomma, although the river actually changed course in the area around the year 1450. Previously the church was on the east side before the river broke through its boundaries and changed course.

== History ==
The earliest existing historical records of the church date back to the year 1388, but the church was not new that year. The first church at Hof was a wooden stave church that was probably built around the beginning of the 13th century. This church stood about 60 metres (200 ft) to the northwest of the present church site. The church had two wooden portals that are still in existence at a museum. Around the year 1600, the old stave church was heavily renovated and enlarged, leaving little of the original structure remaining. The original building had a long church design, but the addition of two transept wings, gave the building a cruciform floor plan. A church porch was built on the west end of the nave. The choir was located in the eastern wing of the church. A sacristy was built on the north side of the choir. The outside of the building was clad with vertical wood siding.

In 1814, this church served as an election church (Norwegian: valgkirke). Together with more than 300 other parish churches across Norway, it was a polling station for elections to the 1814 Norwegian Constituent Assembly which wrote the Constitution of Norway. This was Norway's first national elections. Each church parish was a constituency that elected people called "electors" who later met together in each county to elect the representatives for the assembly that was to meet at Eidsvoll Manor later that year.

In 1858, the old church was torn down. A new, larger brick church was constructed on roughly the same site. The foundation stone was laid in 1858. The building was a cruciform design that was designed by Christian Heinrich Grosch. A man named Schøyen was the lead builder for the project. The new church was consecrated on 17 October 1860. The new church originally sat about 625 people, including 145 seats in the second floor seating galleries. In 1954–1955, the church was renovated. During this project, the second floor seating galleries were all removed.

== Media gallery ==
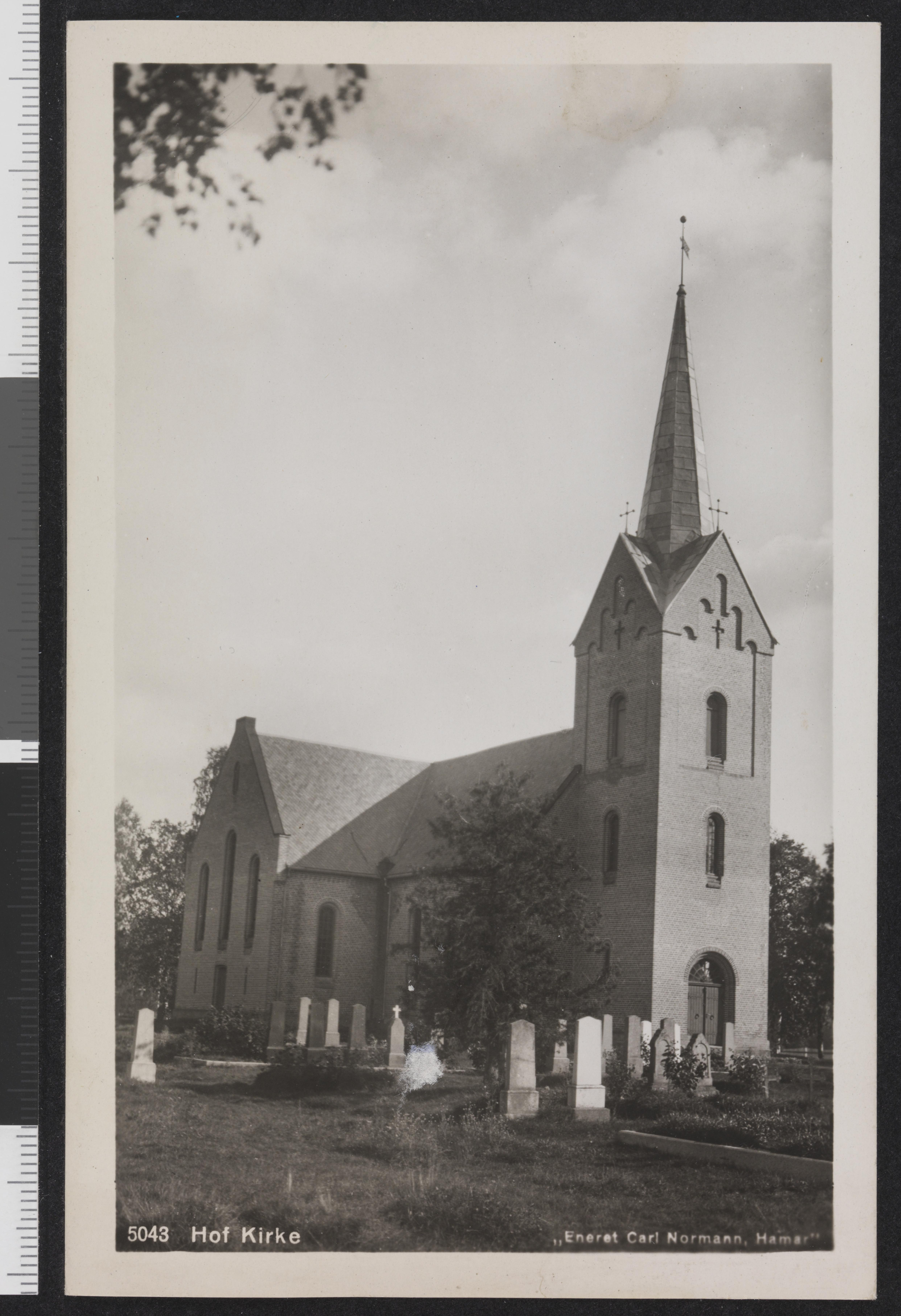

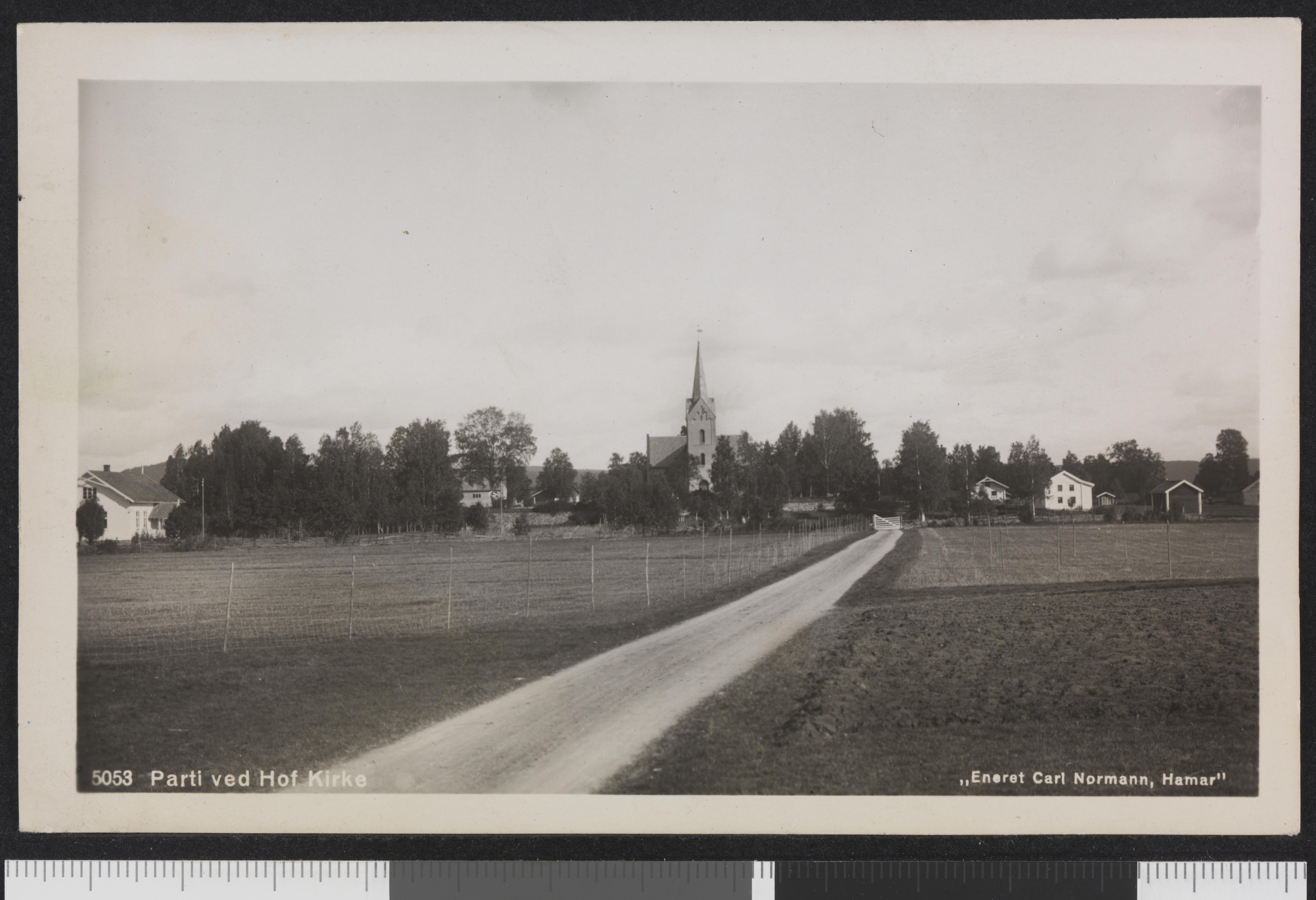

== See also ==
- List of churches in Hamar
