= Elverum (disambiguation) =

Elverum may refer to:

== Places ==
- Elverum Municipality, a municipality in Innlandet county, Norway.
- Elverum (town), a town within Elverum Municipality in Innlandet county, Norway.
- Elverum Stadion, a stadium in the town of Elverum in Innlandet county, Norway.
- Elverum Hospital, a hospital in the town of Elverum in Innlandet county, Norway.
- Elverum Station, a railway station in the town of Elverum in Innlandet county, Norway.
- Elverum Church, a church in the town of Elverum in Innlandet county, Norway.

== People ==
- Phil Elverum, an American musician, songwriter, record producer and visual artist.
- Geneviève Castrée (née Elverum), a Canadian cartoonist, illustrator, and musician.
- Elverum (surname), a list of people with the surname Elverum.

== Sports ==
- Elverum Håndball, a handball team from Elverum Municipality in Innlandet county, Norway.
- Elverum Fotball, an association football team from Elverum Municipality in Innlandet county, Norway.
- Elverum IL, a sports club based in Elverum Municipality in Innlandet county, Norway.

== Other ==
- Elverum Authorization, a law in World War II era Norway to give the Cabinet absolute authority during the Nazi invasion.
