= Norderåa =

River in Innlandet, Norway

Norderåa Nørderåa
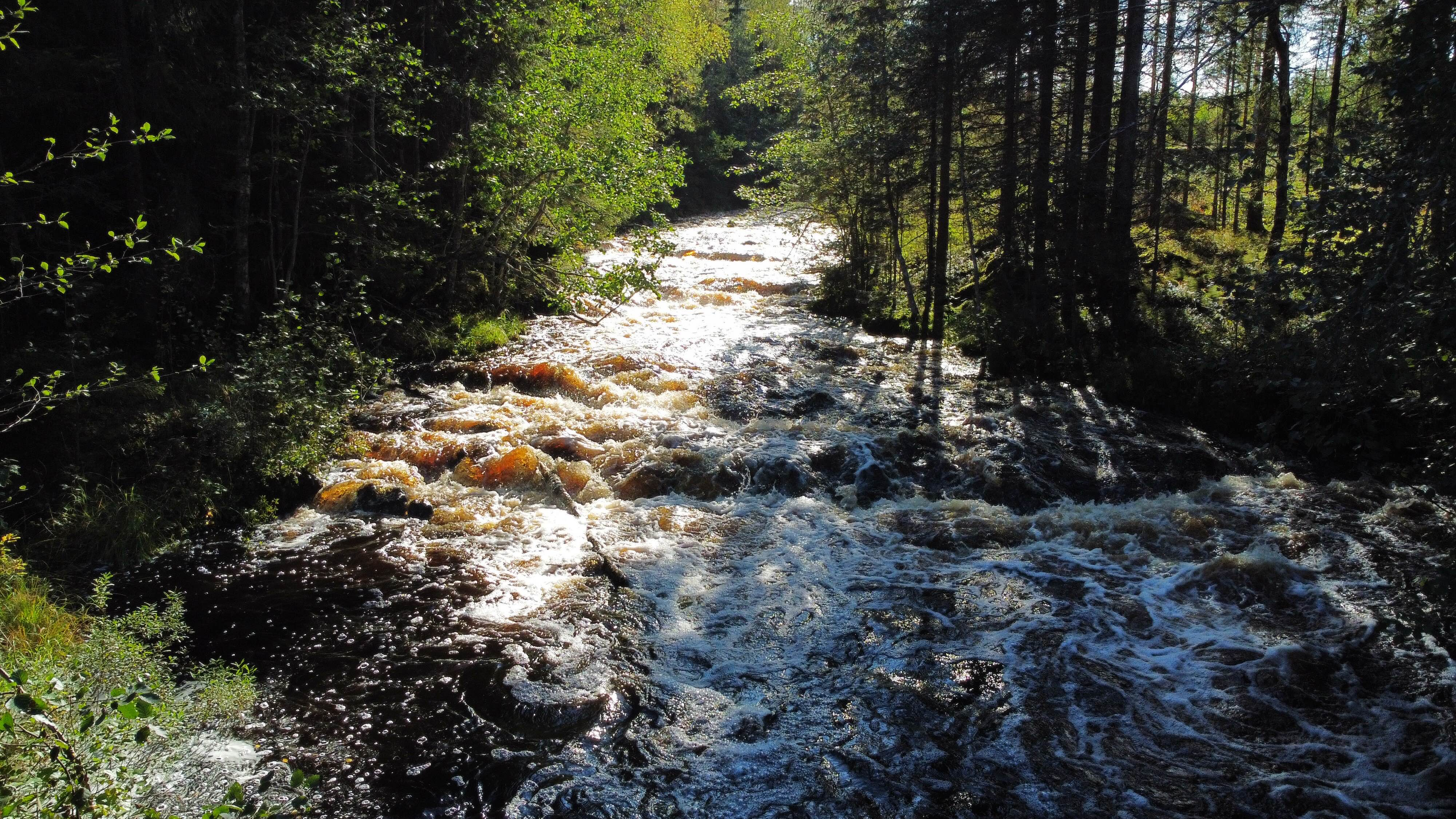
- Etymology: Njörðr

Location
- Country: Norway
- County: Innlandet
- Municipalities: Elverum Municipality

Physical characteristics
- Source: Rudstjennet
  - location: Elverum Municipality, Norway
  - coordinates: 60.79486°N 11.55082°E
  - elevation: 200 metres (660 ft)
- 2nd source: Dyrgåstjennet
  - location: Løten Municipality, Norway
  - coordinates: 60.74504°N 11.59718°E
  - elevation: 421 metres (1,381 ft)
- Mouth: Glomma
  - location: Elverum Municipality, Norway
  - coordinates: 60.80536°N 11.62282°E
  - elevation: 165 metres (541 ft)
- Length: 4.6 km (2.9 mi)

Norderåa (or Nørderåa) is a small river in Elverum Municipality in Innlandet county, Norway. The river mouth lies a short distance to the southwest of the village of Heradsbygd. The main course has a length of 4.6 kilometres (2.9 mi) and it is a tributary of the large river Glomma, falling into it from the west. The river likely got its name from the Norse god Njörðr.

== See also ==
- List of rivers in Norway
