= Nordskogbygda Church =

Church in Innlandet, Norway

- Nordskogbygda kirke
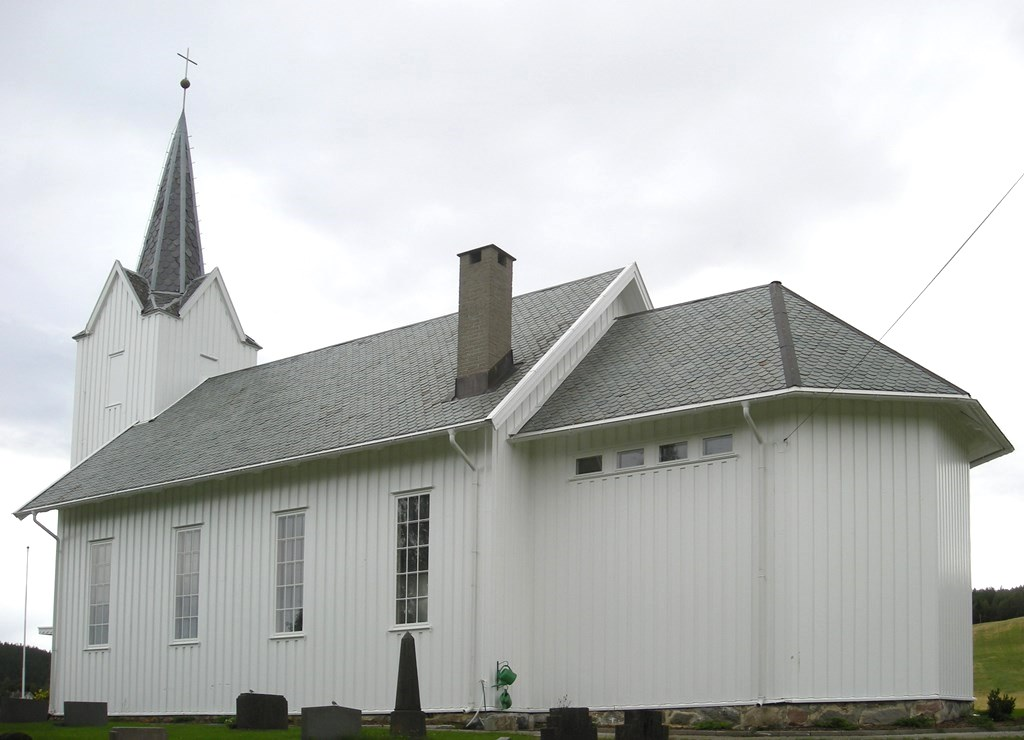
- View of the church
- Nordskogbygda Church
- 60°59′32″N 11°41′46″E
- Location: Elverum Municipality, Innlandet
- Country: Norway
- Denomination: Church of Norway
- Churchmanship: Evangelical Lutheran

History
- Former name: Nedreberg Chapel
- Status: Parish church
- Founded: 1873
- Consecrated: 19 November 1873

Architecture
- Functional status: Active
- Architect: Otto Schønheyder
- Architectural type: Long church
- Completed: 1873 (153 years ago)

Specifications
- Capacity: 250
- Materials: Wood

Administration
- Diocese: Hamar bispedømme
- Deanery: Sør-Østerdal prosti
- Parish: Nordskogbygda
- Norwegian Cultural Heritage Site
- Type: Church
- Status: Not protected
- ID: 85169

Nordskogbygda Church (Norwegian: Nordskogbygda kirke) is a parish church of the Church of Norway in Elverum Municipality in Innlandet county, Norway. It is located in the village of Nordskogbygda. It is the church for the Nordskogbygda parish which is part of the Sør-Østerdal prosti (deanery) in the Diocese of Hamar. The white, wooden church was built in a long church design in 1873 using plans drawn up by the architect Otto Schønheyder. The church seats about 250 people.

== History ==
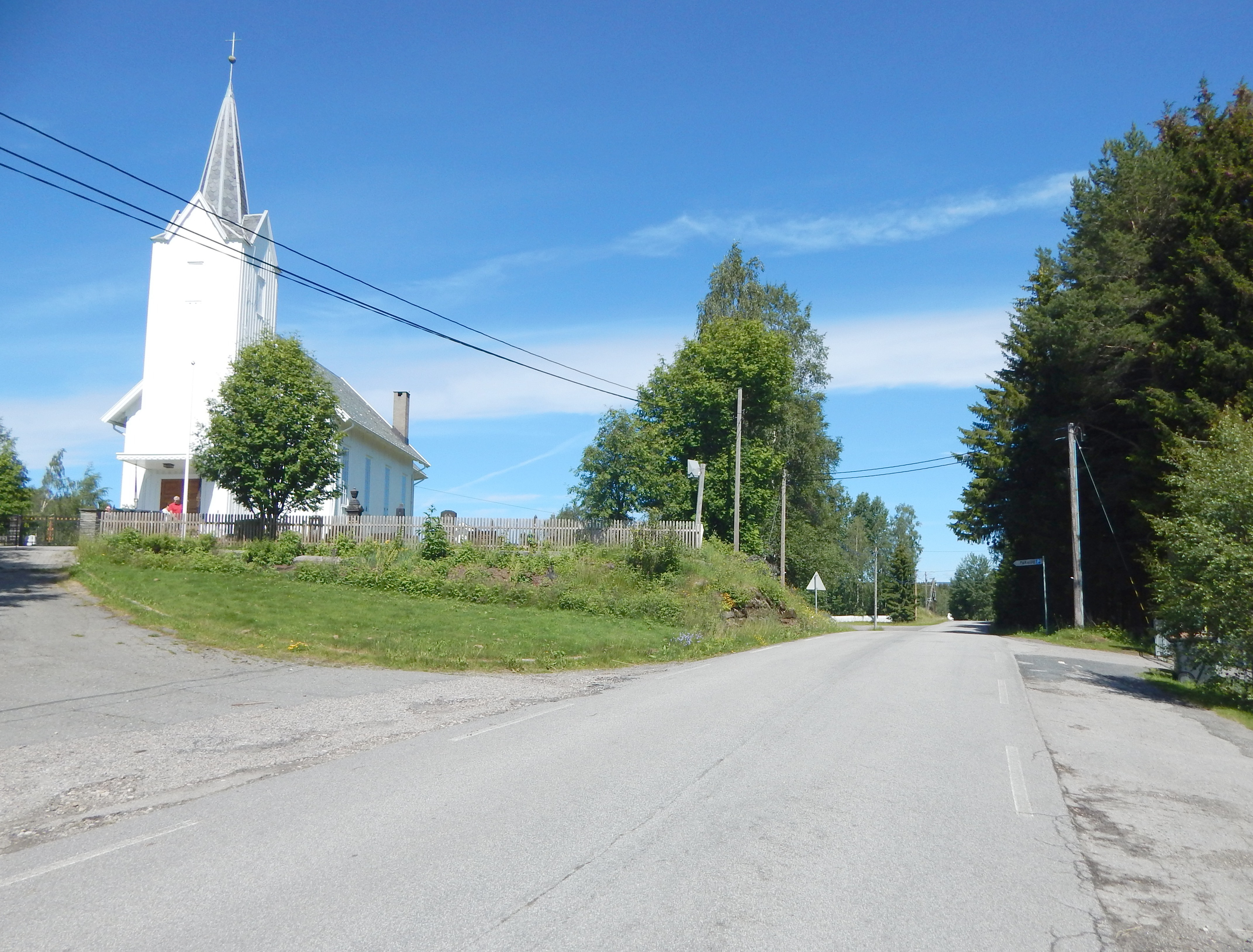
View of the church

In 1869, it was decided to build an annex chapel in Nordskogbygda, northeast of the town of Elverum. (Another chapel at Sørskogbygda was built at the same time by the same architect. Identical buildings except this one was smaller.) Land was donated by the local farmer Iver Nederberg. The church was designed by Otto Schønheyder and the lead builder was Günther Schüssler. The building was constructed in 1873. It was consecrated as Nedreberg Chapel on 19 November 1873. In 1963, the chapel was remodeled using plans by Rolf Prague. At the completion of this project, it was re-named Nordskogbygda Chapel. More recently, the chapel was upgraded to the status of parish church and it was renamed Nordskogbygda Church.

== See also ==
- List of churches in Hamar
