= Sørskogbygda Church =

Church in Innlandet, Norway

- Sørskogbygda kirke
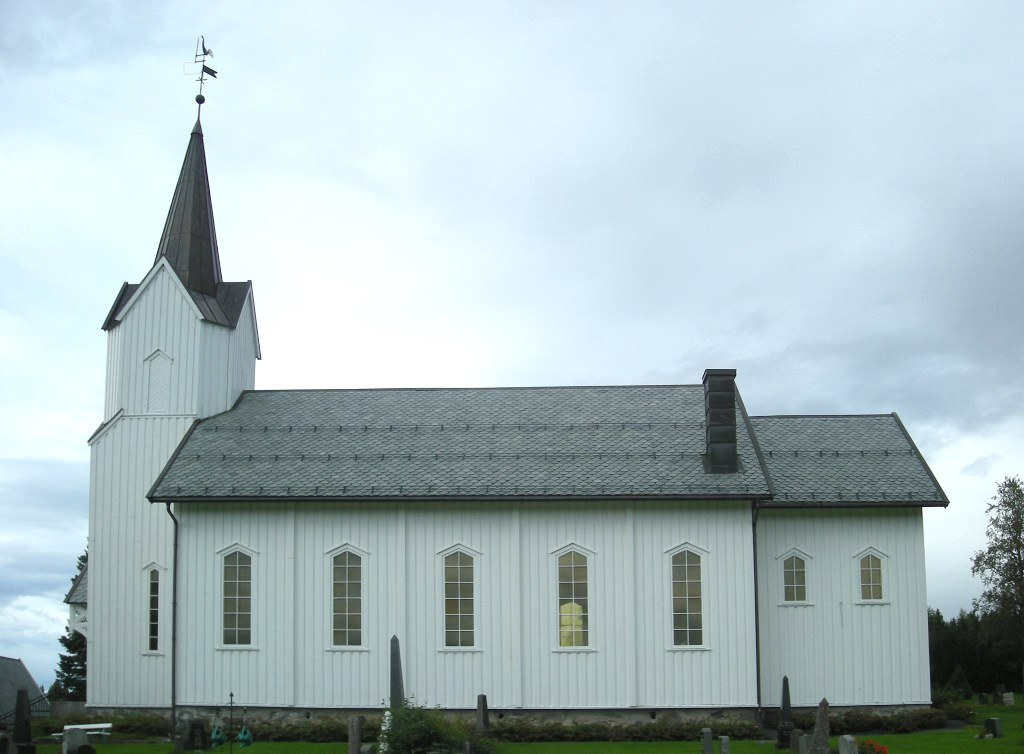
- View of the church
- Sørskogbygda Church
- 60°56′34″N 11°46′26″E
- Location: Elverum Municipality, Innlandet
- Country: Norway
- Denomination: Church of Norway
- Churchmanship: Evangelical Lutheran

History
- Status: Parish church
- Founded: 1873
- Consecrated: 1873

Architecture
- Functional status: Active
- Architect: Otto Schønheyder
- Architectural type: Long church
- Completed: 1873 (153 years ago)

Specifications
- Capacity: 400
- Materials: Wood

Administration
- Diocese: Hamar bispedømme
- Deanery: Sør-Østerdal prosti
- Parish: Sørskogbygda
- Norwegian Cultural Heritage Site
- Type: Church
- Status: Not protected
- ID: 85059

Sørskogbygda Church (Norwegian: Sørskogbygda kirke) is a parish church of the Church of Norway in Elverum Municipality in Innlandet County, Norway. It is located in the village of Sørskogbygda. It is the church for the Sørskogbygda parish, which is part of the Sør-Østerdal prosti (deanery) in the Diocese of Hamar. The white, wooden church was built in a long church design in 1873 using plans drawn up by the architect Otto Schønheyder. The church seats about 400 people.

== History ==
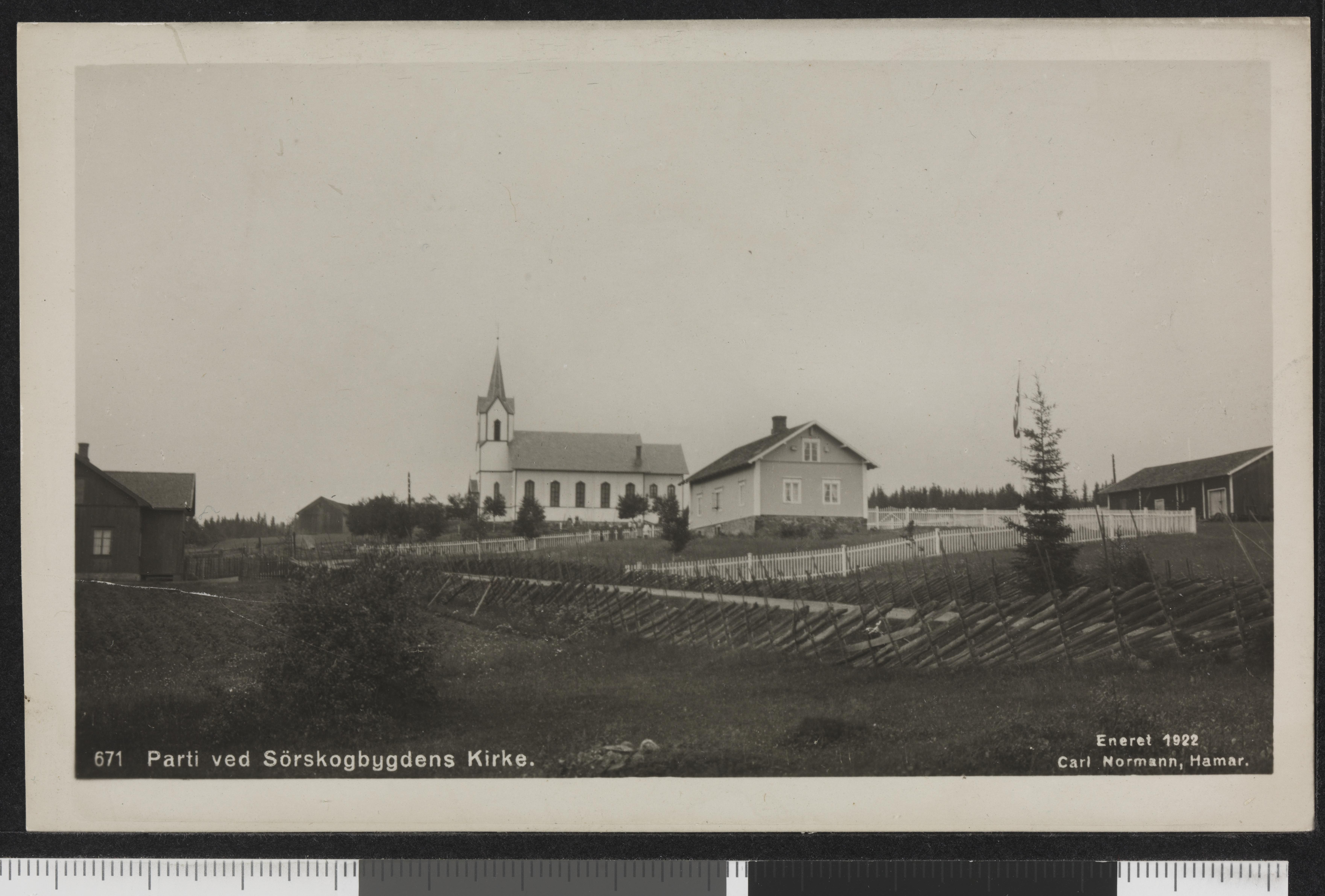
View of the church in 1922.

In 1869, it was decided to build an annex chapel in Sørskogbygda, southeast of Elverum. (Another chapel at Nordskogbygda was built at the same time by the same architect. Identical buildings, except this one was larger.) Otto Schønheyder designed the church, which was built by a group of local carpenters. The style is often described as late Art Nouveau, but the windows and entrance are otherwise very reminiscent of the Swiss chalet style. The church was built and consecrated in 1873.

== See also ==
- List of churches in Hamar
