= Rogstad =

Rogstad is a Norwegian surname. Notable people with the surname include:

- Anker Rogstad (1925–1994), Norwegian safecracker and writer
- Anna Rogstad (1854–1938), Norwegian politician, women's rights activist and educator
- Gunnar Rogstad (1916–2012), Norwegian civil servant and diplomat
- Henrik Rogstad (1916–1945), Norwegian politician
- Niels Wisløff Rogstad (1814–1880), Norwegian civil servant and lawyer
- Olaf Rogstad (1877–1969), Norwegian engineer and civil servant
- Solveig Rogstad (born 1982), Norwegian biathlete

== See also ==
- Rogstad Glacier
