= Heradsbygd Church =

Church in Innlandet, Norway

- Heradsbygd kirke
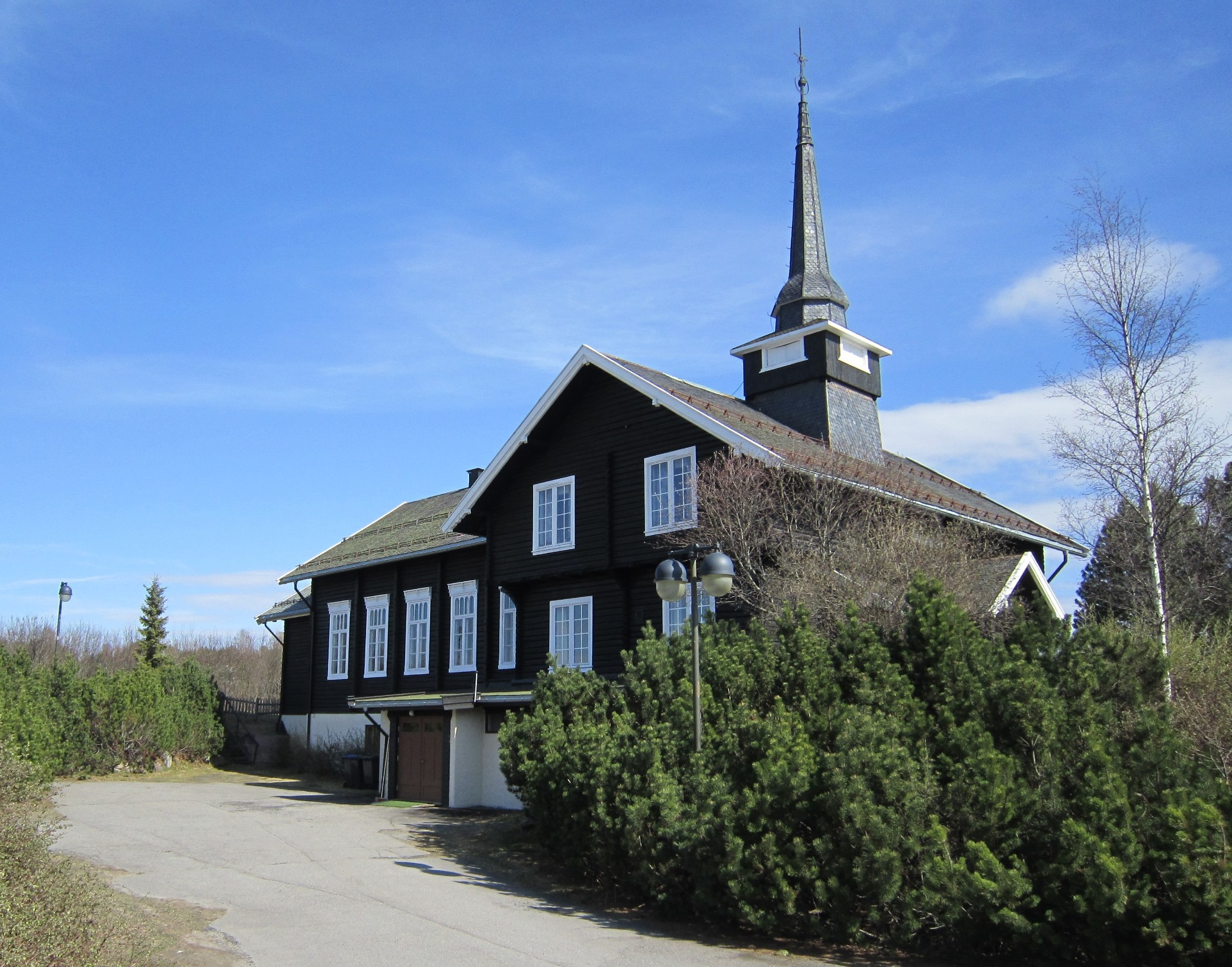
- View of the church
- Heradsbygd Church
- 60°49′22″N 11°38′04″E
- Location: Elverum Municipality, Innlandet
- Country: Norway
- Denomination: Church of Norway
- Churchmanship: Evangelical Lutheran

History
- Status: Parish church
- Founded: 1895
- Consecrated: 1911

Architecture
- Functional status: Active
- Architect: Henrik Bull
- Architectural type: Long church
- Style: National Romantic style
- Completed: 1895 (131 years ago)

Specifications
- Capacity: 180
- Materials: Wood

Administration
- Diocese: Hamar bispedømme
- Deanery: Sør-Østerdal prosti
- Parish: Heradsbygd
- Norwegian Cultural Heritage Site
- Type: Church
- Status: Protected
- ID: 84556

Heradsbygd Church (Norwegian: Heradsbygd kirke) is a parish church of the Church of Norway in Elverum Municipality in Innlandet county, Norway. It is located in the village of Heradsbygd. It is the church for the Heradsbygd parish which is part of the Sør-Østerdal prosti (deanery) in the Diocese of Hamar. The brown, wooden church was built in a long church design in the National Romantic style in 1895 using plans drawn up by the architect Henrik Bull. The church seats about 180 people.

== History ==
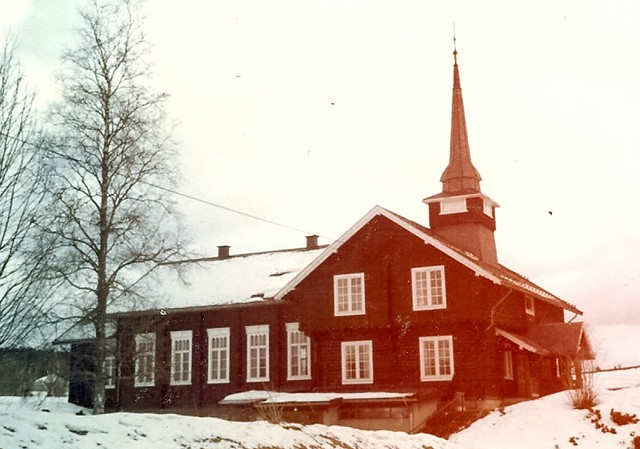
View of the church Credit: www.kirkenorge.no

In 1895, the architect Henrik Bull made designs for the building which was to become a prayer house for the village. It was designed in the National Romantic style. It was built using donations and gifts to fund the construction. Over time, more money was raised and in 1911 it was enlarged and consecrated as an annex chapel for the Elverum Church parish. More recently, the chapel was upgraded to parish church status.

== See also ==
- List of churches in Hamar
