= Neverlia =

Farm area in Elverum Municipality, Norway

- Village
- Interactive map of Neverlia
- Location within Innlandet Location within Norway
- Coordinates: 61.02952°N 11.74599°E
- Country: Norway
- Region: Eastern Norway
- County: Innlandet
- District: Østerdalen
- Municipality: Elverum Municipality
- Elevation: 370 m (1,210 ft)
- Time zone: UTC+01:00 (CET)
  - Summer (DST): UTC+02:00 (CEST)
- Post Code: 2410 Hernes

Neverlia is a small farm area in Elverum Municipality in Innlandet county, Norway. The village area is located about 4 kilometres (2.5 mi) northeast of the village of Nordskogbygda and about 20 kilometres (12 mi) northeast of the town of Elverum. The principal industries of Neverlia are farming and forestry.
