= Hernes Church =

Church in Innlandet, Norway

- Hernes kirke
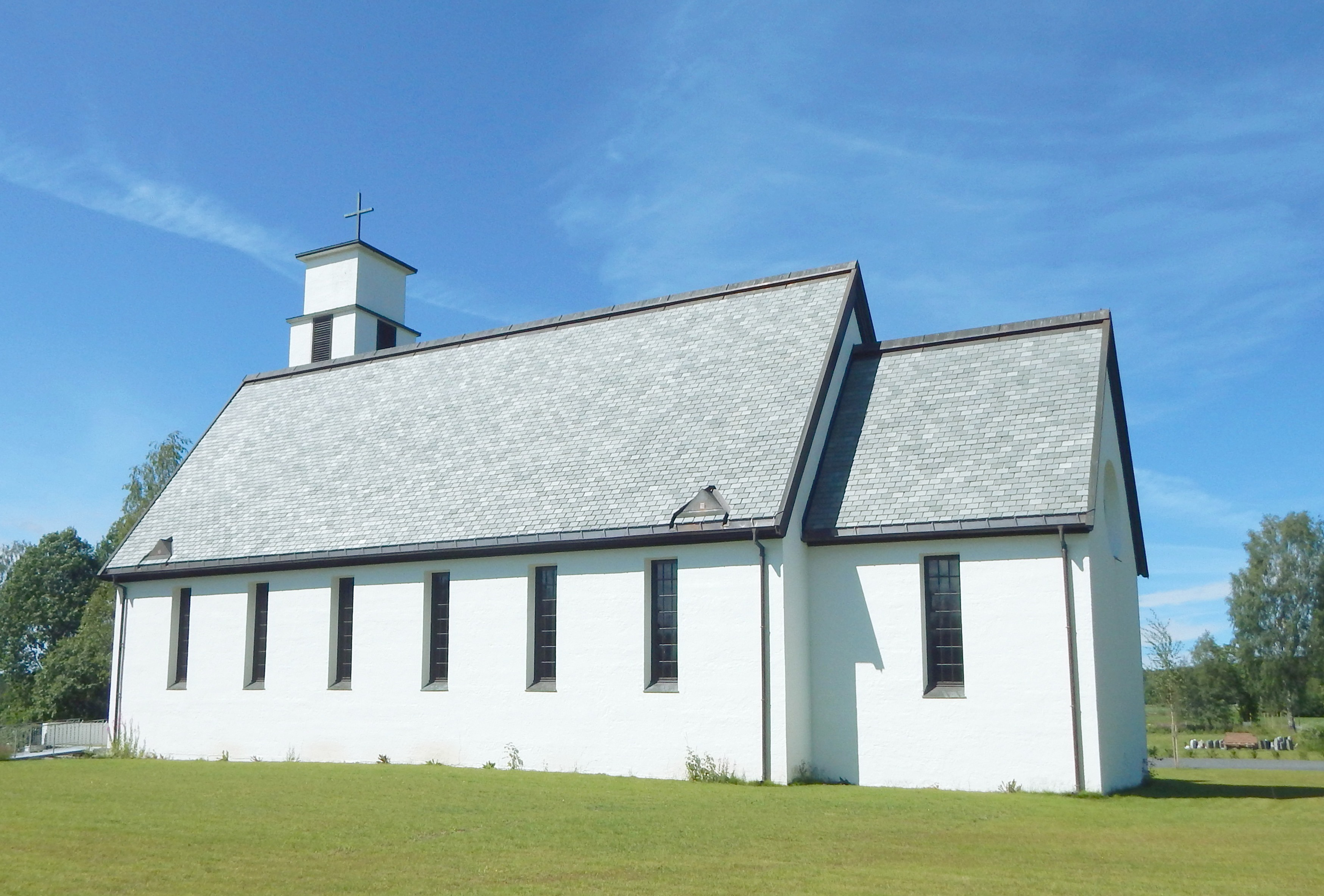
- View of the church
- Hernes Church
- 60°55′37″N 11°38′01″E
- Location: Elverum Municipality, Innlandet
- Country: Norway
- Denomination: Church of Norway
- Churchmanship: Evangelical Lutheran

History
- Status: Parish church
- Founded: 1935
- Consecrated: 4 October 1935

Architecture
- Functional status: Active
- Architect: Gunnar Bjerke
- Architectural type: Long church
- Completed: 1935 (91 years ago)

Specifications
- Capacity: 250
- Materials: Stone

Administration
- Diocese: Hamar bispedømme
- Deanery: Sør-Østerdal prosti
- Parish: Hernes
- Norwegian Cultural Heritage Site
- Type: Church
- Status: Protected
- ID: 85169

Hernes Church (Norwegian: Hernes kirke) is a parish church of the Church of Norway in Elverum Municipality in Innlandet county, Norway. It is located in the village of Hernes. It is the church for the Hernes parish which is part of the Sør-Østerdal prosti (deanery) in the Diocese of Hamar. The white, stone church was built in a long church design in 1935 using plans drawn up by the architect Gunnar Bjerke. The church seats about 250 people.

== History ==
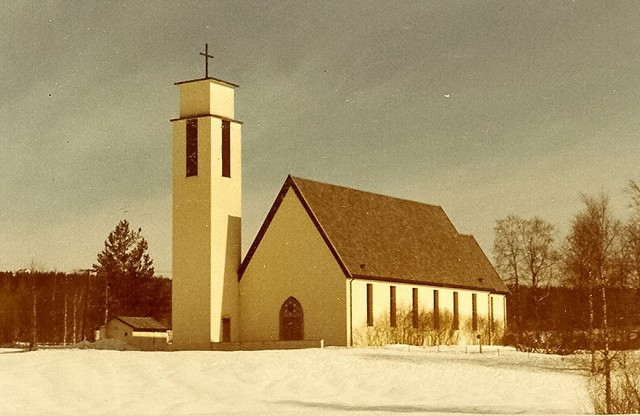
View of the church Credit: www.kirkenorge.no

Planning for a new church in Hernes began in the first part of the 20th century, before World War II. The architect Gunnar Bjerke was hired to design the new church. Construction on the building took place in 1935. It is a stone church with a rectangular nave and a choir on the east end. There are two sacristies on the north side of the nave and an asymmetrically placed tower on the west end of the nave. The building was consecrated on 4 October 1935. In 2005, there was a fire in the church due to a problem with the electrical system. The building was repaired afterwards.

== See also ==
- List of churches in Hamar
