= Åsmund Sveen =

Norwegian poet, novelist and literary critic

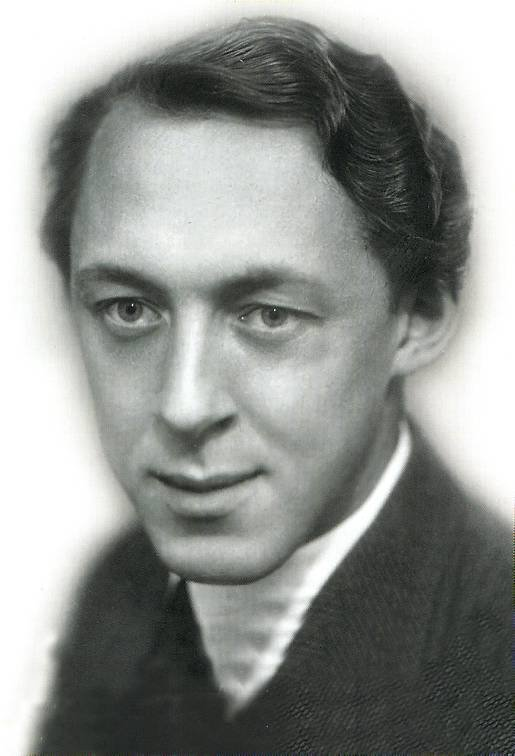
- Born: 28 April 1910; Elverum, Norway
- Died: 31 January 1963 (aged 52)
- Occupations: Poet; Novelist; Literary critic

Åsmund Sveen (28 April 1910 – 31 January 1963) was a Norwegian poet, novelist and literary critic. He was born in Elverum Municipality. Among his poetry collections are Andletet from 1932 and Eros syng from 1935. He published the novel Svartjord in 1937.

In the legal purge in Norway after World War II Sveen was sentenced to several years imprisonment.
