= Heradsbygd =

Village in Elverum Municipality, Norway

Heradsbygd Heradsbygda
- Village
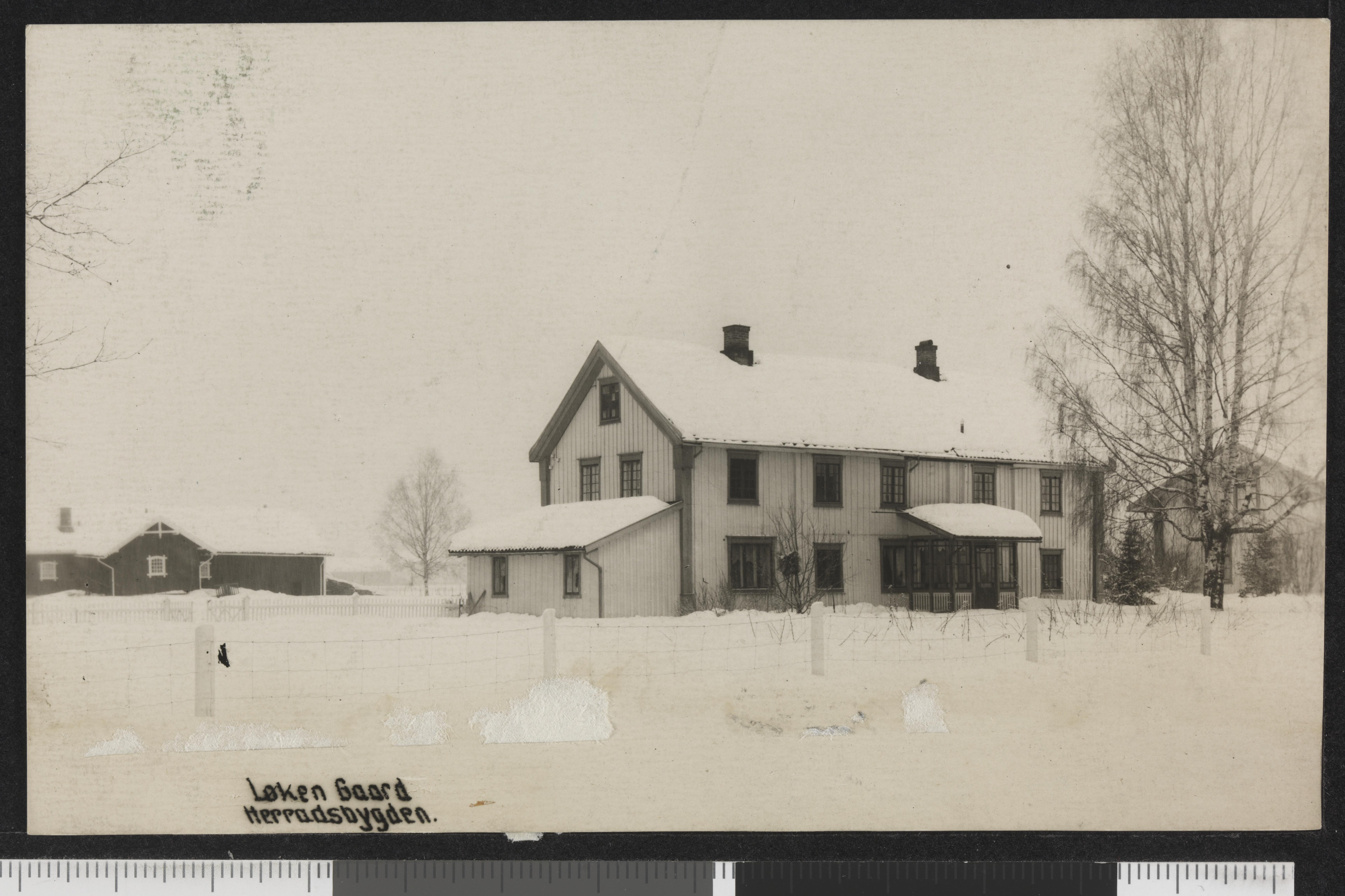
- View of a village farm (c. 1910)
- Interactive map of Heradsbygd
- Location within Innlandet Location within Norway
- Coordinates: 60.82281°N 11.63804°E
- Country: Norway
- Region: Eastern Norway
- County: Innlandet
- District: Østerdalen
- Municipality: Elverum Municipality

Area
  - Total: 1.04 km^{2} (0.40 sq mi)
- Elevation: 186 m (610 ft)

Population (2024)
  - Total: 489
  - Density: 470/km^{2} (1,200/sq mi)
- Time zone: UTC+01:00 (CET)
  - Summer (DST): UTC+02:00 (CEST)
- Post Code: 2415 Heradsbygd

Heradsbygd is a village in Elverum Municipality in Innlandet county, Norway. The village is located along the river Glomma, about 8 kilometres (5.0 mi) south of the town of Elverum. The Norwegian National Road 2 and Solørbanen railway line both pass through the village. Heradsbygd Church is located in the village.

The 1.04-square-kilometre (260-acre) village has a population (2024) of 489 and a population density of 470 inhabitants per square kilometre (1,200/sq mi).
