= Rune Djurhuus =

Norwegian chess grandmaster (born 1970)

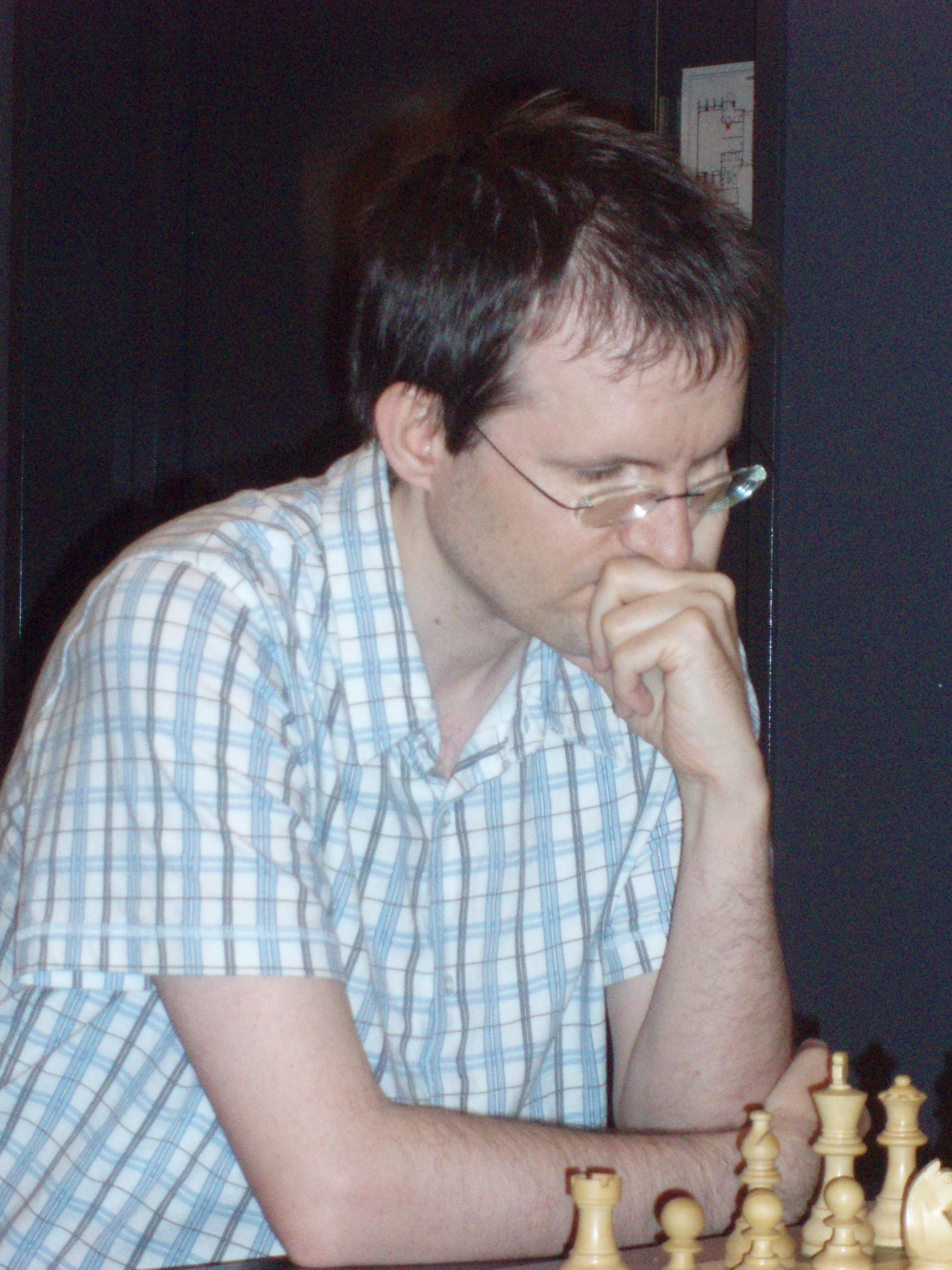
- Djurhuus at the Norwegian Chess Championship at Hamar 2007

Personal information
- Born: 25 January 1970 (age 56) Elverum, Norway

Chess career
- Country: Norway
- Title: Grandmaster (1996), International Correspondence Chess Master (1994)
- Peak rating: 2530 (January 1997)
- ICCF rating: 2574 (July 1999)
- ICCF peak rating: 2584 (July 1996)

Rune Djurhuus (born 25 January 1970 in Elverum) is a Norwegian chess player, and the fourth Norwegian International Grandmaster. Djurhuus plays for the "Akademisk" chess club, which is tied to the University of Oslo. Djurhuus is also the chess columnist for Aftenposten and Adresseavisen.

Djurhuus became the Norwegian Junior Champion in 1985. He gained the title of International Master in 1989. In 1991 he became the European Junior Champion, ahead of Vladimir Kramnik among others. His Grandmaster title was gained after scoring a norm at the Chess Olympiad in Manila in 1992, and two norms at Gausdal, in the 1994-1995 tournament, and the 1995-1996 tournament.

Djurhuus' playing style is aggressive and sharp. With Black, Djurhuus regularly employs the King's Indian against 1.d4, and the Sicilian Defence against 1.e4. With White, Djurhuus usually opens with 1.e4.

== Sample game ==
In an informal poll by the Norwegian Chess Federation in 1999, this game was voted to be the best Norwegian game.

Ķeņģis vs Djurhuus, Gausdal 1991

Position: h1 white rook, e1 white king, d1 white queen, c1 white bishop, a1 white rook, h2 white pawn, g2 white pawn, b2 white pawn, g3 white knight, f3 white knight, d3 white bishop, a3 white pawn, d4 white pawn, e5 white pawn, d5 black pawn, e6 black pawn, c6 black knight, b6 black queen, h7 black pawn, g7 black pawn, e7 black bishop, d7 black knight, b7 black pawn, a7 black pawn, g8 black king, f8 black rook, c8 black bishop, a8 black rook

After 13.fxe5

White: Edvīns Ķeņģis Black: Rune Djurhuus

Opening: French Defence

Event: Gausdal International, 1991

1.e4 e6 2.d4 d5 3.Nd2 Nf6 4.e5 Nfd7 5.f4 c5 6.c3 Nc6 7.Ndf3 Qb6 8.Ne2 cxd4 9.cxd4 Be7 10.a3 0-0 11.Ng3 f6 12.Bd3 fxe5 13.fxe5 (Diagram) 13...Ndxe5 14.dxe5 Nxe5 15.Be2 Bd7 16.Nxe5 Qf2+ 17.Kd2 Rac8 18.Qb3 Bg5+ 19.Kd3 Rf4 20.Nf3 Be8, White resigns.
