= Elverum (surname) =

Elverum is a Norwegian surname. Notable people with the surname include:

- Kim Rene Elverum Sorsell (born 1988), Norwegian ski jumper
- Pete Elverum, American politician
- Phil Elverum (born 1978), American songwriter, producer, and visual artist
