= Olaf Rogstad =

Norwegian engineer and civil servant (1877–1969)

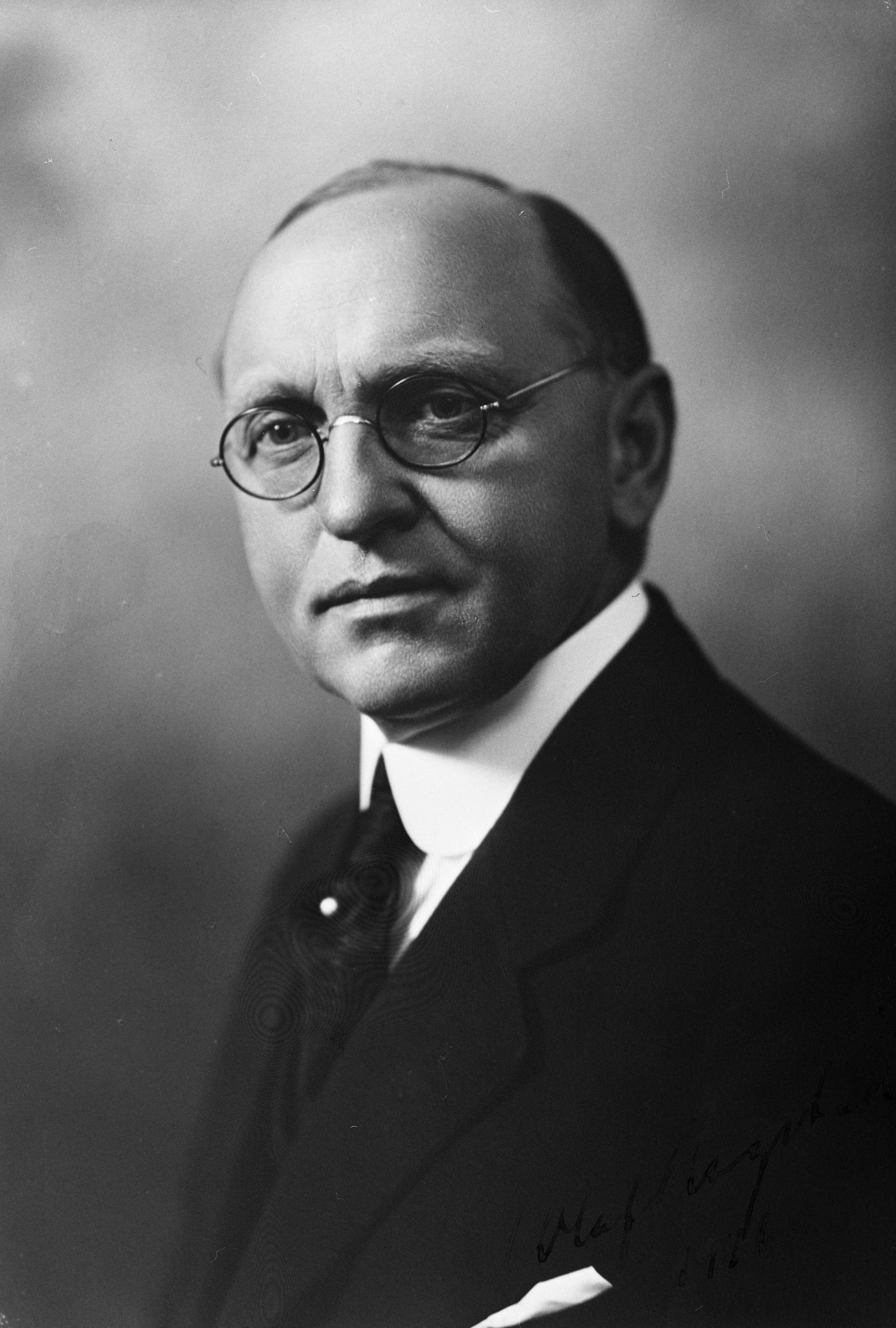
- Image of Olaf Rogstad, from the Norwegian Water Resources and Energy Directorate
- Born: 4 April 1877; Elverum, Norway
- Died: 7 July 1969 (aged 92)
- Education: Trondhjems Tekniske Læreanstalt
- Occupations: Engineer, Civil servant
- Known for: Director-General of the Norwegian Water Resources and Electricity Agency
- Spouse: Hildur Louise Møystad (m. 1903)
- Parent: Ole Rogstad (father)
- Awards: Knight, First Class of Order of St. Olav

Olaf Rogstad (4 April 1877 – 7 July 1969) was a Norwegian engineer and civil servant. He was also a glaciologist. He was decorated as a Knight, First Class of Order of St. Olav.

== Personal life ==
Rogstad was born in Elverum, a son of farmer Ole Rogstad and Petronelle Marthea Grøtting. He was married to Hildur Louise Møystad from 1903.

== Career ==
Rogstad finished his secondary education in 1895 and graduated from the Trondhjems Tekniske Læreanstalt in 1898. He was hired in the Canal Agency in 1898, and the Water Agency in 1907 as head of the hydrographic department. He was promoted to chief engineer in 1920 and director in 1920. From 1925 to 1947 he was the director-general of the Norwegian Water Resources and Electricity Agency, except for the period 1942 to 1945 when he was removed by the German occupiers. Hans Skarphagen was the one who took over in 1942.
