= Elverum Municipality =

Municipality in Innlandet, Norway

Elverum Municipality Elverum kommune
- Municipality
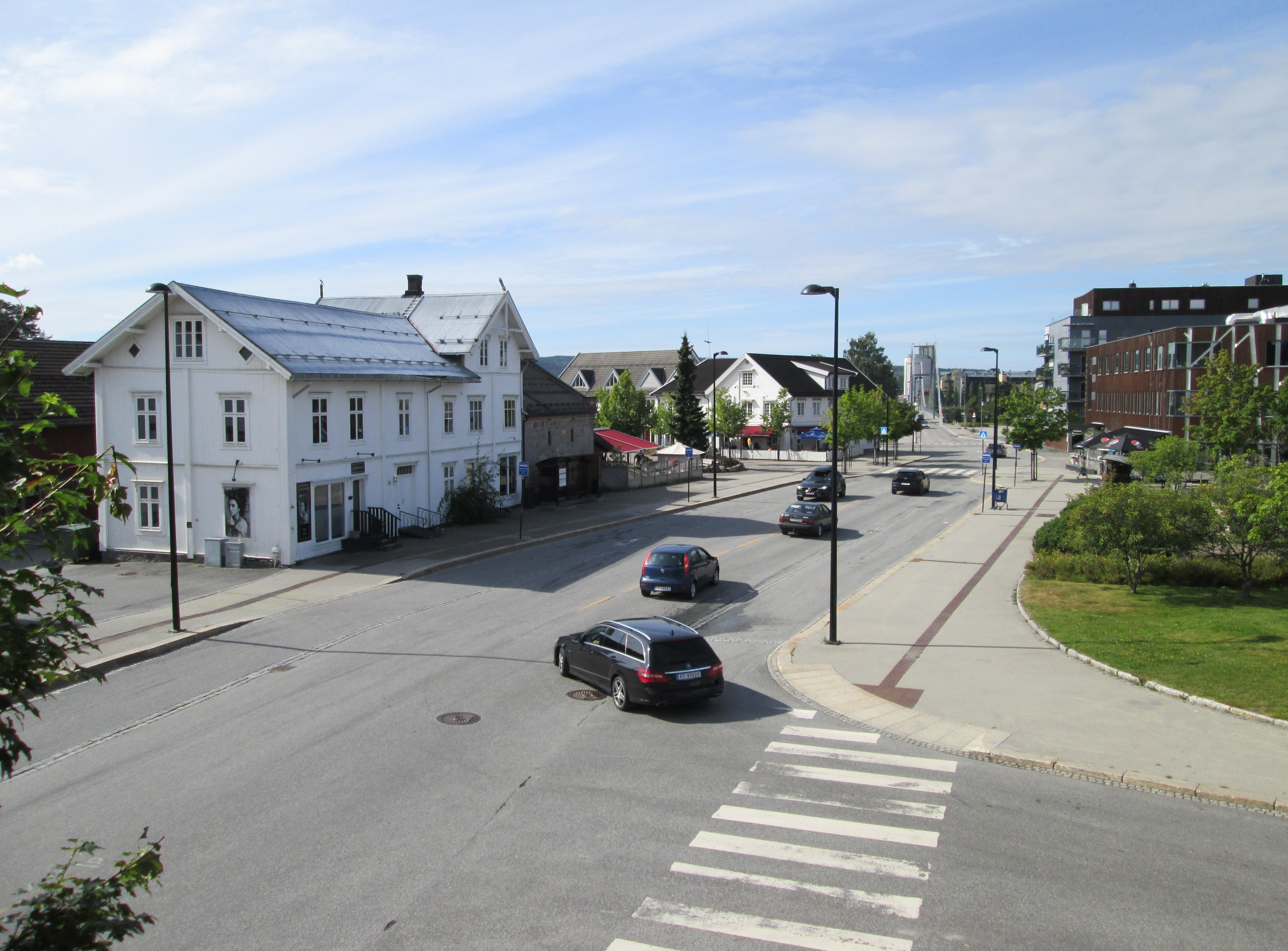
- Ludgaardsvegen at Elverum square, 2022

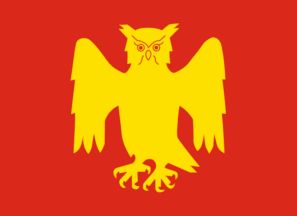
- Flag Coat of arms

- Elverum within Innlandet
- Coordinates: 60°55′39″N 11°42′55″E
- Country: Norway
- County: Innlandet
- District: Østerdalen
- Established: 1 Jan 1838
  - Created as: Formannskapsdistrikt
- Administrative centre: Elverum

Government
  - Mayor (2019): Lillian Skjærvik (Ap)

Area
  - Total: 1,229.27 km^{2} (474.62 sq mi)
  - Land: 1,209.14 km^{2} (466.85 sq mi)
  - Water: 20.13 km^{2} (7.77 sq mi) 1.6%
  - Rank: #87 in Norway
- Highest elevation: 807.81 m (2,650.3 ft)

Population (2025)
  - Total: 21,899
  - Rank: #58 in Norway
  - Density: 17.8/km^{2} (46/sq mi)
  - Change (10 years): ▲ +5.8%
- Demonym(s): Elverumsing; Elverumsokning

Official language
  - Norwegian form: Neutral
- Time zone: UTC+01:00 (CET)
  - Summer (DST): UTC+02:00 (CEST)
- ISO 3166 code: NO-3420
- Website: Official website

Elverum (Norwegian: [ˈɛlvərɵm]) is a municipality in Innlandet County, Norway. It is located in the traditional district of Østerdalen. The administrative centre of the municipality is the town of Elverum. Other settlements in the municipality include the villages of Heradsbygd, Sørskogbygda, and Neverlia. Elverum lies at an important crossroads, with the town of Hamar to the west, the town of Kongsvinger to the south, and village of Innbygda and the Swedish border to the northeast.

The 1,229-square-kilometre (475 sq mi) municipality is the 87th largest by area out of the 357 municipalities in Norway. Elverum Municipality is the 58th most populous municipality in Norway with a population of 21,899. The municipality's population density is 17.8 inhabitants per square kilometre (46/sq mi) and its population has increased by 5.8% over the previous 10-year period.

== General information ==
Elverum Church

The parish of Elverum was established as a municipality on 1 January 1838 (see formannskapsdistrikt law). The borders have not changed since that time.

Historically, the municipality was part of Hedmark county. On 1 January 2020, the municipality became a part of the newly formed Innlandet county (after Hedmark and Oppland counties were merged).

=== Name ===
The municipality (originally the parish) is named after the old Elverum farm (Old Norse: Alfarheimr) since the first Elverum Church was built there. The first element is the genitive case of elfr which means "river" (referring to the Glomma river). The last element is heimr which means "home" or "farm".

=== Coat of arms ===
The coat of arms was granted on 9 December 1988. The official blazon is "Gules, an owl displayed Or" (Norwegian: I rødt ei gull ugle med utslåtte vinger). This means the arms have a red field (background) and the charge is an owl. The owl has a tincture of Or which means it is commonly colored yellow, but if it is made out of metal, then gold is used. This design is a symbol for wisdom and teaching, since Elverum has a number of schools in it. Most owls are forest birds, and the owl can also represent wild animals and birds, and thus symbolize the forest and wilderness areas in and around Elverum. Finally, the owl has lifted wings and claws out which symbolize a determined defense and the fighting spirit of Norwegians. In 1940, when Norway was under attack from the German forces, the government fled to Elverum where King Haakon VII received the power from the Storting to govern the country in exile without the Parliament during the war (Elverum Authorization). The arms were designed by Arvid Sveen. The municipal flag has the same design as the coat of arms.

=== Churches ===
The Church of Norway has five parishes (sokn) within Elverum Municipality. It is part of the Sør-Østerdal prosti (deanery) in the Diocese of Hamar.

Churches in Elverum
| Parish (sokn) | Church name | Location of the church | Year built |
|---|---|---|---|
| Elverum | Elverum Church | Elverum | 1736 |
| Heradsbygd | Heradsbygd Church | Heradsbygd | 1895 |
| Hernes | Hernes Church | Hernes | 1935 |
| Nordskogbygda | Nordskogbygda Church | Nordskogbygda | 1873 |
| Sørskogbygda | Sørskogbygda Church | Sørskogbygda | 1873 |

== Geography ==
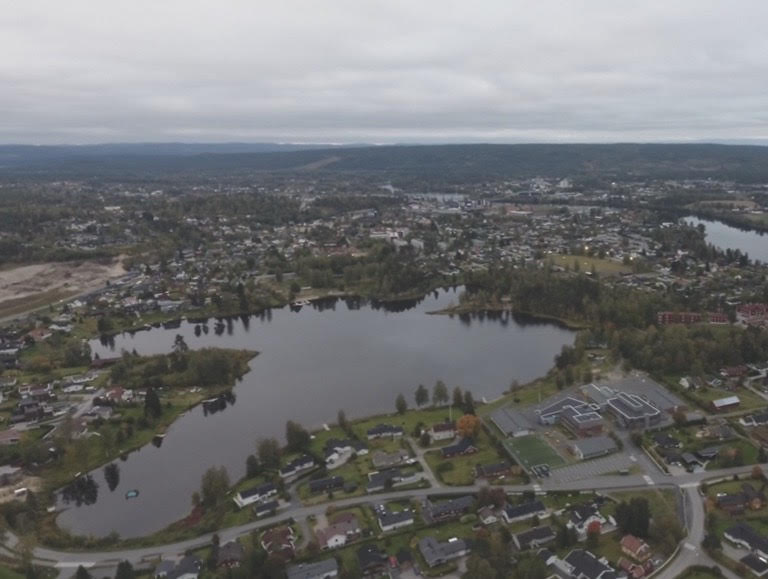
Sagtjernet, as seen from above.

Elverum lies at an important crossroads, with the town of Hamar to the west, the town of Kongsvinger to the south, and village of Innbygda and the Swedish border to the northeast. It is bordered on the north by Åmot Municipality, in the northeast by Trysil Municipality, in the south by Våler Municipality, and in the west by Løten Municipality.

Sagtjernet is a lake in the northern parts of Elverum where lots of residents visit in the summer. It is a lake formed by the last ice age. Rokosjøen is another lake in the municipality. The rivers Julussa, Glomma, and Flisa flow through the municipality. The highest point in the municipality is the 807.81-metre (2,650.3 ft) tall unnamed tripoint on the border of Elverum Municipality, Trysil Municipality, and Åmot Municipality.

== Government ==
Elverum Municipality is responsible for primary education (through 10th grade), outpatient health services, senior citizen services, welfare and other social services, zoning, economic development, and municipal roads and utilities. The municipality is governed by a municipal council of directly elected representatives. The mayor is indirectly elected by a vote of the municipal council. The municipality is under the jurisdiction of the Hedmarken og Østerdal District Court and the Eidsivating Court of Appeal.

=== Municipal council ===
The municipal council (Kommunestyre) of Elverum is made up of 35 representatives that are elected to four year terms. The tables below show the current and historical composition of the council by political party.

Elverum kommunestyre 2023–2027
| Party name (in Norwegian) | Number of representatives |
|---|---|
| Labour Party (Arbeiderpartiet) | 11 |
| Progress Party (Fremskrittspartiet) | 3 |
| Green Party (Miljøpartiet De Grønne) | 1 |
| Conservative Party (Høyre) | 7 |
| Industry and Business Party (Industri‑ og Næringspartiet) | 1 |
| Norway Democrats (Norgesdemokratene) | 1 |
| Pensioners' Party (Pensjonistpartiet) | 3 |
| Centre Party (Senterpartiet) | 4 |
| Socialist Left Party (Sosialistisk Venstreparti) | 3 |
| Liberal Party (Venstre) | 1 |
| Total number of members: | 35 |

Elverum kommunestyre 2019–2023
| Party name (in Norwegian) | Number of representatives |
|---|---|
| Labour Party (Arbeiderpartiet) | 13 |
| Progress Party (Fremskrittspartiet) | 3 |
| Green Party (Miljøpartiet De Grønne) | 2 |
| Conservative Party (Høyre) | 4 |
| Pensioners' Party (Pensjonistpartiet) | 1 |
| Centre Party (Senterpartiet) | 8 |
| Socialist Left Party (Sosialistisk Venstreparti) | 4 |
| Total number of members: | 35 |

Elverum kommunestyre 2015–2019
| Party name (in Norwegian) | Number of representatives |
|---|---|
| Labour Party (Arbeiderpartiet) | 14 |
| Progress Party (Fremskrittspartiet) | 2 |
| Green Party (Miljøpartiet De Grønne) | 1 |
| Conservative Party (Høyre) | 10 |
| Centre Party (Senterpartiet) | 4 |
| Socialist Left Party (Sosialistisk Venstreparti) | 2 |
| Liberal Party (Venstre) | 1 |
| Team Elverum - Politics for town and country (Team Elverum - Politikk for by og bygd) | 1 |
| Total number of members: | 35 |

Elverum kommunestyre 2011–2015
| Party name (in Norwegian) | Number of representatives |
|---|---|
| Labour Party (Arbeiderpartiet) | 14 |
| Progress Party (Fremskrittspartiet) | 3 |
| Conservative Party (Høyre) | 13 |
| Centre Party (Senterpartiet) | 2 |
| Socialist Left Party (Sosialistisk Venstreparti) | 1 |
| Liberal Party (Venstre) | 1 |
| Team Elverum - Politics for town and country (Team Elverum - Politikk for by og bygd) | 1 |
| Total number of members: | 35 |

Elverum kommunestyre 2007–2011
| Party name (in Norwegian) | Number of representatives |
|---|---|
| Labour Party (Arbeiderpartiet) | 14 |
| Progress Party (Fremskrittspartiet) | 6 |
| Conservative Party (Høyre) | 6 |
| Centre Party (Senterpartiet) | 3 |
| Socialist Left Party (Sosialistisk Venstreparti) | 2 |
| Liberal Party (Venstre) | 4 |
| Total number of members: | 35 |

Elverum kommunestyre 2003–2007
| Party name (in Norwegian) | Number of representatives |
|---|---|
| Labour Party (Arbeiderpartiet) | 14 |
| Progress Party (Fremskrittspartiet) | 6 |
| Conservative Party (Høyre) | 4 |
| Christian Democratic Party (Kristelig Folkeparti) | 1 |
| Centre Party (Senterpartiet) | 3 |
| Socialist Left Party (Sosialistisk Venstreparti) | 4 |
| Liberal Party (Venstre) | 3 |
| Total number of members: | 35 |

Elverum kommunestyre 1999–2003
| Party name (in Norwegian) | Number of representatives |
|---|---|
| Labour Party (Arbeiderpartiet) | 17 |
| Progress Party (Fremskrittspartiet) | 6 |
| Conservative Party (Høyre) | 5 |
| Christian Democratic Party (Kristelig Folkeparti) | 1 |
| Centre Party (Senterpartiet) | 5 |
| Socialist Left Party (Sosialistisk Venstreparti) | 4 |
| Liberal Party (Venstre) | 3 |
| Total number of members: | 41 |

Elverum kommunestyre 1995–1999
| Party name (in Norwegian) | Number of representatives |
|---|---|
| Labour Party (Arbeiderpartiet) | 19 |
| Progress Party (Fremskrittspartiet) | 4 |
| Conservative Party (Høyre) | 5 |
| Christian Democratic Party (Kristelig Folkeparti) | 1 |
| Centre Party (Senterpartiet) | 7 |
| Socialist Left Party (Sosialistisk Venstreparti) | 4 |
| Liberal Party (Venstre) | 1 |
| Total number of members: | 41 |

Elverum kommunestyre 1991–1995
| Party name (in Norwegian) | Number of representatives |
|---|---|
| Labour Party (Arbeiderpartiet) | 20 |
| Progress Party (Fremskrittspartiet) | 3 |
| Conservative Party (Høyre) | 8 |
| Centre Party (Senterpartiet) | 8 |
| Socialist Left Party (Sosialistisk Venstreparti) | 9 |
| Liberal Party (Venstre) | 1 |
| Total number of members: | 49 |

Elverum kommunestyre 1987–1991
| Party name (in Norwegian) | Number of representatives |
|---|---|
| Labour Party (Arbeiderpartiet) | 26 |
| Progress Party (Fremskrittspartiet) | 5 |
| Conservative Party (Høyre) | 9 |
| Centre Party (Senterpartiet) | 4 |
| Socialist Left Party (Sosialistisk Venstreparti) | 4 |
| Liberal Party (Venstre) | 1 |
| Total number of members: | 49 |

Elverum kommunestyre 1983–1987
| Party name (in Norwegian) | Number of representatives |
|---|---|
| Labour Party (Arbeiderpartiet) | 26 |
| Progress Party (Fremskrittspartiet) | 3 |
| Conservative Party (Høyre) | 10 |
| Christian Democratic Party (Kristelig Folkeparti) | 1 |
| Centre Party (Senterpartiet) | 5 |
| Socialist Left Party (Sosialistisk Venstreparti) | 3 |
| Liberal Party (Venstre) | 1 |
| Total number of members: | 49 |

Elverum kommunestyre 1979–1983
| Party name (in Norwegian) | Number of representatives |
|---|---|
| Labour Party (Arbeiderpartiet) | 22 |
| Conservative Party (Høyre) | 11 |
| Christian Democratic Party (Kristelig Folkeparti) | 2 |
| Centre Party (Senterpartiet) | 7 |
| Socialist Left Party (Sosialistisk Venstreparti) | 4 |
| Liberal Party (Venstre) | 2 |
| Cross-party local list (Tverrpolitisk Folkelist) | 1 |
| Total number of members: | 49 |

Elverum kommunestyre 1975–1979
| Party name (in Norwegian) | Number of representatives |
|---|---|
| Labour Party (Arbeiderpartiet) | 25 |
| Conservative Party (Høyre) | 7 |
| Christian Democratic Party (Kristelig Folkeparti) | 2 |
| New People's Party (Nye Folkepartiet) | 1 |
| Centre Party (Senterpartiet) | 9 |
| Socialist Left Party (Sosialistisk Venstreparti) | 4 |
| Liberal Party (Venstre) | 1 |
| Total number of members: | 49 |

Elverum kommunestyre 1971–1975
| Party name (in Norwegian) | Number of representatives |
|---|---|
| Labour Party (Arbeiderpartiet) | 26 |
| Conservative Party (Høyre) | 5 |
| Christian Democratic Party (Kristelig Folkeparti) | 1 |
| Centre Party (Senterpartiet) | 10 |
| Liberal Party (Venstre) | 2 |
| Socialist common list (Venstresosialistiske felleslister) | 5 |
| Total number of members: | 49 |

Elverum kommunestyre 1967–1971
| Party name (in Norwegian) | Number of representatives |
|---|---|
| Labour Party (Arbeiderpartiet) | 26 |
| Conservative Party (Høyre) | 6 |
| Communist Party (Kommunistiske Parti) | 1 |
| Christian Democratic Party (Kristelig Folkeparti) | 1 |
| Centre Party (Senterpartiet) | 9 |
| Socialist People's Party (Sosialistisk Folkeparti) | 4 |
| Liberal Party (Venstre) | 2 |
| Total number of members: | 49 |

Elverum kommunestyre 1963–1967
| Party name (in Norwegian) | Number of representatives |
|---|---|
| Labour Party (Arbeiderpartiet) | 28 |
| Conservative Party (Høyre) | 7 |
| Communist Party (Kommunistiske Parti) | 2 |
| Christian Democratic Party (Kristelig Folkeparti) | 1 |
| Centre Party (Senterpartiet) | 8 |
| Socialist People's Party (Sosialistisk Folkeparti) | 2 |
| Liberal Party (Venstre) | 1 |
| Total number of members: | 49 |

Elverum herredsstyre 1959–1963
| Party name (in Norwegian) | Number of representatives |
|---|---|
| Labour Party (Arbeiderpartiet) | 24 |
| Conservative Party (Høyre) | 7 |
| Communist Party (Kommunistiske Parti) | 5 |
| Christian Democratic Party (Kristelig Folkeparti) | 1 |
| Centre Party (Senterpartiet) | 9 |
| Liberal Party (Venstre) | 1 |
| Elverum Social Democratic Party (Elverum Sosialdemokratiske Parti) | 2 |
| Total number of members: | 49 |

Elverum herredsstyre 1955–1959
| Party name (in Norwegian) | Number of representatives |
|---|---|
| Labour Party (Arbeiderpartiet) | 22 |
| Conservative Party (Høyre) | 7 |
| Communist Party (Kommunistiske Parti) | 10 |
| Farmers' Party (Bondepartiet) | 9 |
| Liberal Party (Venstre) | 1 |
| Total number of members: | 49 |

Elverum herredsstyre 1951–1955
| Party name (in Norwegian) | Number of representatives |
|---|---|
| Labour Party (Arbeiderpartiet) | 14 |
| Conservative Party (Høyre) | 6 |
| Communist Party (Kommunistiske Parti) | 7 |
| Farmers' Party (Bondepartiet) | 6 |
| Liberal Party (Venstre) | 2 |
| List of workers, fishermen, and small farmholders (Arbeidere, fiskere, småbrukere liste) | 13 |
| Total number of members: | 48 |

Elverum herredsstyre 1947–1951
| Party name (in Norwegian) | Number of representatives |
|---|---|
| Labour Party (Arbeiderpartiet) | 23 |
| Conservative Party (Høyre) | 6 |
| Communist Party (Kommunistiske Parti) | 12 |
| Farmers' Party (Bondepartiet) | 5 |
| Joint list of the Liberal Party (Venstre) and the Radical People's Party (Radikale Folkepartiet) | 2 |
| Total number of members: | 48 |

Elverum herredsstyre 1945–1947
| Party name (in Norwegian) | Number of representatives |
|---|---|
| Labour Party (Arbeiderpartiet) | 16 |
| Conservative Party (Høyre) | 4 |
| Communist Party (Kommunistiske Parti) | 9 |
| Farmers' Party (Bondepartiet) | 2 |
| Joint list of the Liberal Party (Venstre) and the Radical People's Party (Radikale Folkepartiet) | 1 |
| Total number of members: | 32 |

Elverum herredsstyre 1937–1941*
| Party name (in Norwegian) | Number of representatives |
|---|---|
| Labour Party (Arbeiderpartiet) | 21 |
| Conservative Party (Høyre) | 5 |
| Nasjonal Samling Party (Nasjonal Samling) | 1 |
| Farmers' Party (Bondepartiet) | 4 |
| Liberal Party (Venstre) | 1 |
| Total number of members: | 32 |
Note: Due to the German occupation of Norway during World War II, no elections were held for new municipal councils until after the war ended in 1945.

=== Mayors ===
The mayor (Norwegian: ordfører) of Elverum Municipality is the political leader of the municipality and the chairperson of the municipal council. Here is a list of people who have held this position:

- 1838–1841: Hans Øvergaard
- 1841–1845: Svend Stenersen
- 1845–1847: Gulbrand Øvergaard
- 1847–1851: John Koppang
- 1851–1855: Peter Mathias Bugge
- 1855–1857: Adolph Grüner Næser
- 1857–1859: Andreas Grøtting
- 1859–1861: Otto Gudmundsen Søberg
- 1861–1863: Adolph Grüner Næser
- 1863–1867: Andreas Grøtting
- 1867–1869: John Aakrann
- 1869–1871: Andreas Grøtting
- 1871–1873: John Aakrann
- 1873–1875: Nils Schøyen
- 1875–1879: Andreas Grøtting
- 1879–1881: Gunder Sætersmoen (H)
- 1881–1883: Henrik Opsahl (V)
- 1884–1890: Eivind Torp (V)
- 1890–1893: Anton Matheus Andreassen (V)
- 1893–1893: Helge Væringsaasen (V)
- 1893–1895: Gunnar Skirbekk (V / ArbDem)
- 1895–1897: Peder Christensen Løken (H)
- 1897–1901: Peder Østmoe (V)
- 1902–1907: Olav Andreas Eftestøl (ArbDem)
- 1908–1916: Johan Peter Røkke (ArbDem)
- 1917–1919: Oluf Hansen Haugen (Ap)
- 1920–1922: Elias Johannesen Augestad (Ap)
- 1923–1931: Martinius Røkeberg (Ap)
- 1932–1940: Olav Jørgen Sæter (Ap)
- 1940–1945: Simon Grindalen (NS)
- 1945–1945: Olav Jørgen Sæter (Ap)
- 1945–1945: Enok Sletengen (Ap)
- 1946–1947: Martin Trovåg (NKP)
- 1948–1951: Otto Ødegaard (Ap)
- 1952–1962: Enok Sletengen (Ap)
- 1962–1979: Markvard Bækken (Ap)
- 1980–1983: Kjersti Borgen (Sp)
- 1984–1994: Olav Sæter (Ap)
- 1994–2003: Per-Gunnar Sveen (Ap)
- 2003–2011: Terje Røe (Ap)
- 2011–2019: Erik Hanstad (H)
- 2019–present: Lillian Skjærvik (Ap)

== History ==
Number of minorities (1st and 2nd generation) in Elverum by country of origin in 2018
| Ancestry | Number |
|---|---|
| Somalia | 283 |
| Poland | 238 |
| Sweden | 112 |
| Russia | 109 |
| Iraq | 102 |
| Eritrea | 99 |
| Bosnia-Herzegovina | 98 |
| Syria | 90 |
| Thailand | 79 |
| Afghanistan | 63 |
| Iran | 56 |
| Denmark | 55 |
| Philippines | 52 |
| Lithuania | 51 |

=== Military ties ===
During the Nordic Seven Years' War (1563–1570), Swedish troops invaded Norway in a number of locations, including a number of incursions into Østerdalen. In 1563, Norwegian troops stopped the Swedish advance at Elverum, which provided a strategic point since it lay on both north–south and east–west trade and travel routes.

The parishes of Idre and Särna originally belonged to the prestegjeld of Elverum, but they were occupied by Swedish troops in 1644, and since then they were lost to Sweden.

Construction of fortifications in Elverum started in 1673 during the Gyldenløve War as Hammersberg Skanse. It was renamed Christiansfjeld Fortress in 1685 by King Christian V of Denmark during his visit to Hammersberg Skanse on June 14. Although the fortress was manned through the Great Northern War, the village was spared major battles. In 1742, Christiansfjeld Fortress was closed.

A Norwegian infantry regiment, the Oppland Regiment, was formed in 1657 and Elverum became a garrison. The area of population east of the river called Leiret (literally the camp) adjacent to Christiansfjeld Fortress was built up by soldiers as well as the merchants and craftsmen who settled nearby. The central areas of the town of Elverum on the east side of the river is referred to as Leiret.

In 1878, Terningmoen at Elverum became the home base for the Oppland Regiment and an infantry school was founded here in 1896. The Oppland Regiment had a history which included courageous involvement in combat from the Swedish wars of the 17th century through the German invasion of Norway in 1940. As part of the general restructuring, the unit was disbanded in 2002.

Today, Terningmoen hosts several sub units within the Norwegian army and the Home guard.

=== Regional market ===
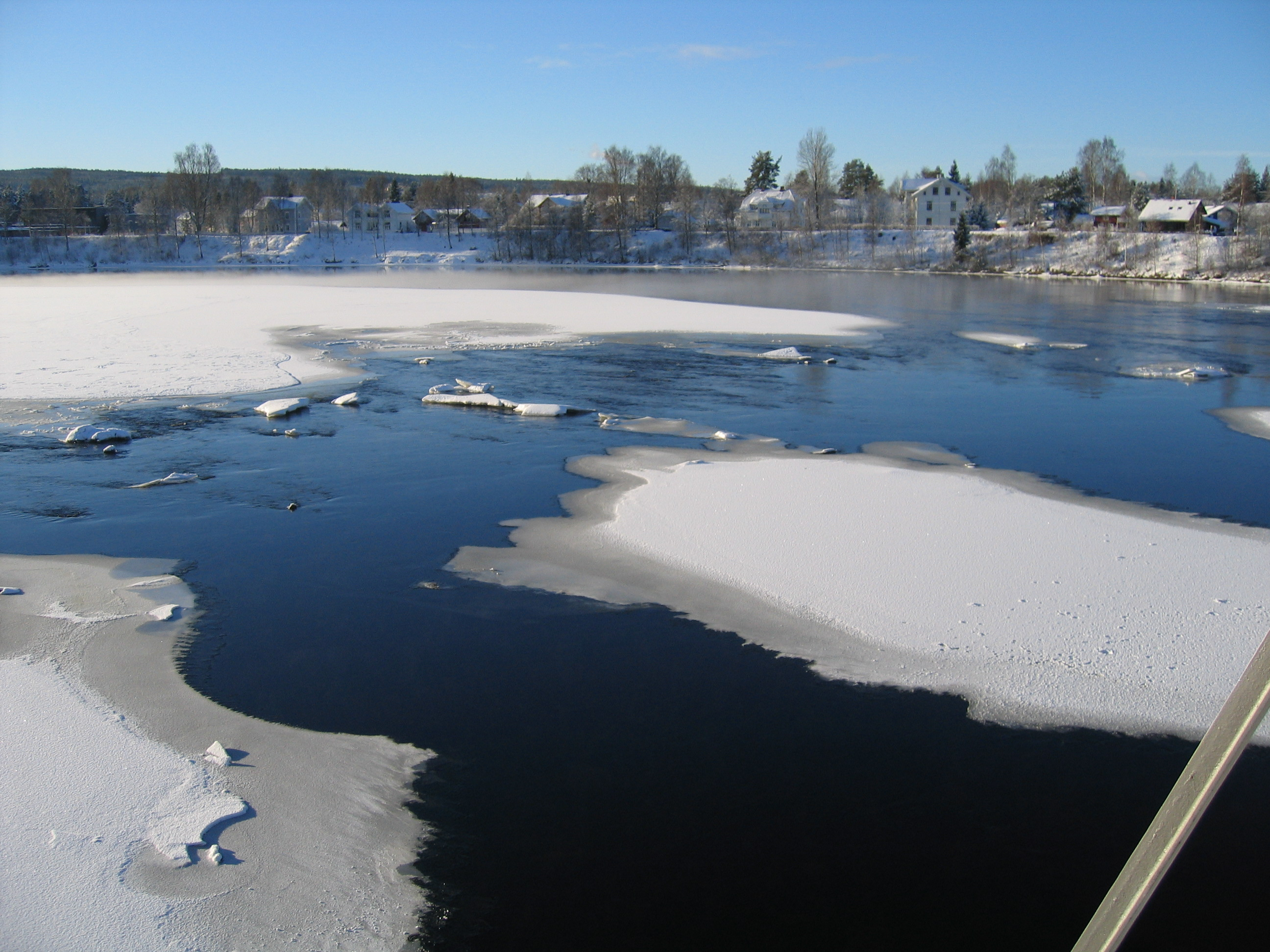
View of the west side of the river Glomma from Gammelbrua

In the Danish-Norwegian period, Elverum was the location for a bailiff (fogd), a judge (sorenskriver), a church provost (prost), and numerous military officers.

It became important as a market town as well. In 1570 Hamar Cathedral in Hamar was burned and Hamarhus castle was destroyed by the Swedish armies during the Seven Years' War with Sweden. Hamar lost its city status, leaving no kjøpstad, or official market city, between Christiania and Trondheim. Eastern Norway needed an organized market for trading goods. The Grundset market (Grundsetmart'n) in Elverum municipality grew to meet the need. It is recorded as existing in the 17th century, and in 1765 the owner of Gaarder obtained special market privileges from the king, to take place six miles north of the population center of Elverum on his estate. By 1767, it was described as Norway's largest and most famous market. In the first week of March, for almost 300 years, the folks of the district met to trade and to celebrate. People from Gudbrandsdal, Oslo, Trøndelag, and Sweden also regularly came to Grundsetmart'n. The Grundset market was finally abandoned in 1901, when pressures of the railroad and other markets made it superfluous.

The railway connecting Oslo and Trondheim passed through Elverum in 1877.

=== World War II ===
Elverum municipality served as a temporary capital of Norway during the World War II German invasion. On 9 April 1940 Norwegian troops prevented German parachute troops from capturing Norway's King Haakon, Crown Prince, and Parliament while the Parliament was meeting to issue the Elverum Authorization, authorizing the exiled government until the Parliament could again convene. On 11 April, shortly after the government's refusal to submit to German terms, the central part of the town of Elverum was reduced to ashes.

== Museums ==
=== Norwegian Forest Museum ===
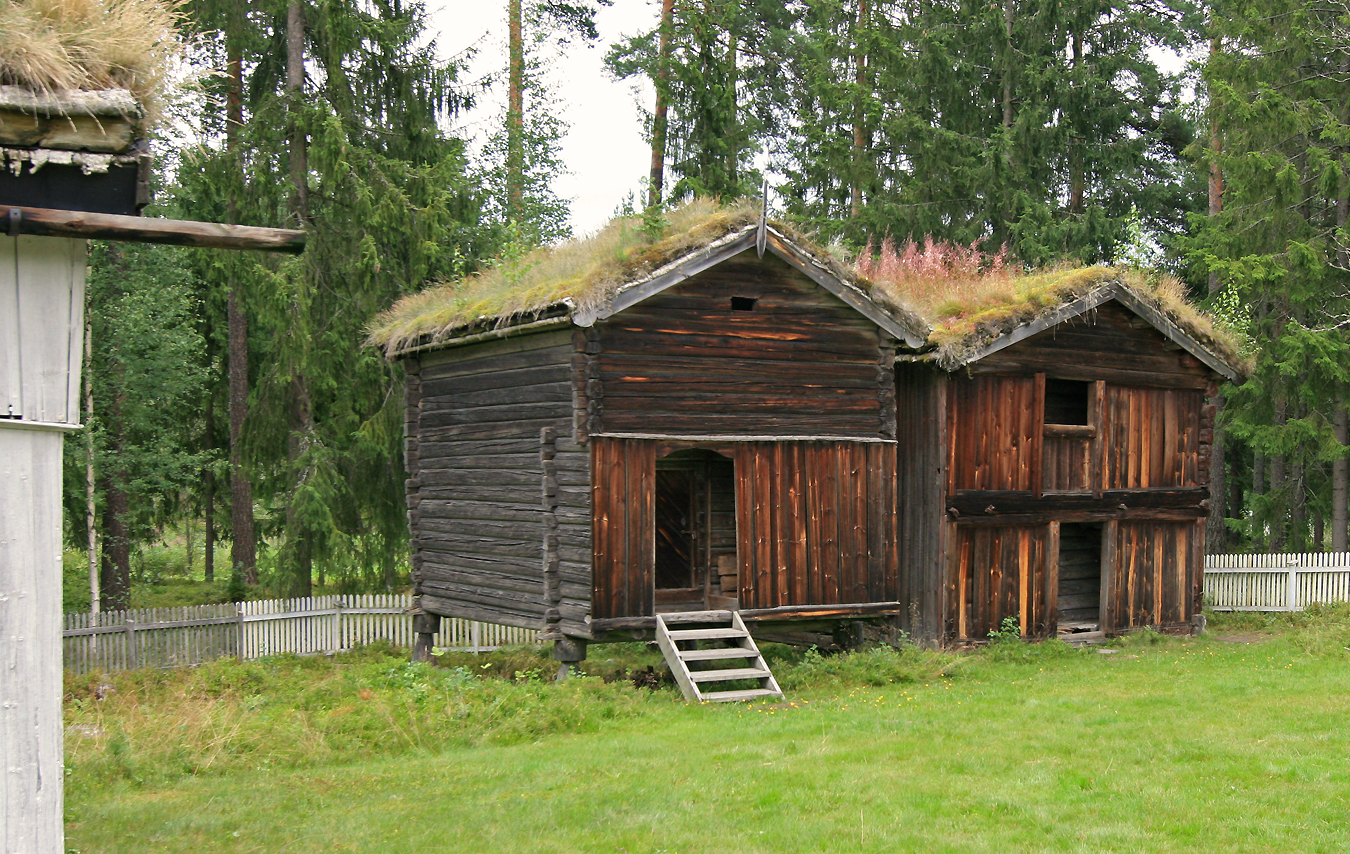
Glomdal Museum

The Norwegian Forest Museum is a national museum recognizing the importance of forestry, hunting, and fishing to the Norwegian history and economy.

=== Glomdal Museum ===
From the eastern side of the Glomma river (the Museum of Norwegian Forestry – Skogmuseet), a pedestrian bridge across the Klokkerfoss waterfall to Prestøya, and then a bridge across the Prestfossen falls leads to the Glomdal Museum, one of the largest Norwegian outdoor museums, with numerous houses from the mountain parishes of Østerdalen and the lowland districts of Solør on the Glomma river valley. The exhibition includes a library with numerous books, including handwritten medieval manuscripts.

== Notable people ==
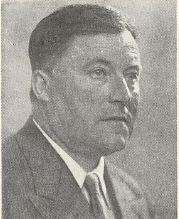
Olav Jørgen Sæter

=== Public service & public thinking ===
- Kristoffer Nilsen Svartbækken Grindalen (1804 in Elverum – 1876), a criminal, killer, and thief
- Stener Johannes Stenersen (1835 in Elverum – 1904), a veterinarian and author of first monograph on the Fjord horse
- Hartvig Andreas Munthe (1845 in Elverum – 1905), a military officer, engineer, and genealogist
- Carl Oscar Munthe (1861 in Elverum – 1952), a Norwegian military officer and historian
- Olaf Rogstad (1877 in Elverum - 1969), former director-general of the Norwegian Water Resources and Electricity Agency
- Olav Jørgen Sæter (1884 in Elverum – 1951), a schoolteacher, newspaper editor, politician, and Mayor of Elverum from 1931 to 1940
- Kristian Løken (1884 in Elverum – 1961), a highly decorated Norwegian military officer
- Knut Storberget (born 1964 in Elverum), a lawyer, politician, and county governor of Innlandet from 2019
- Bjørn Jarle Rødberg Larsen (born 1973), an internet entrepreneur and politician

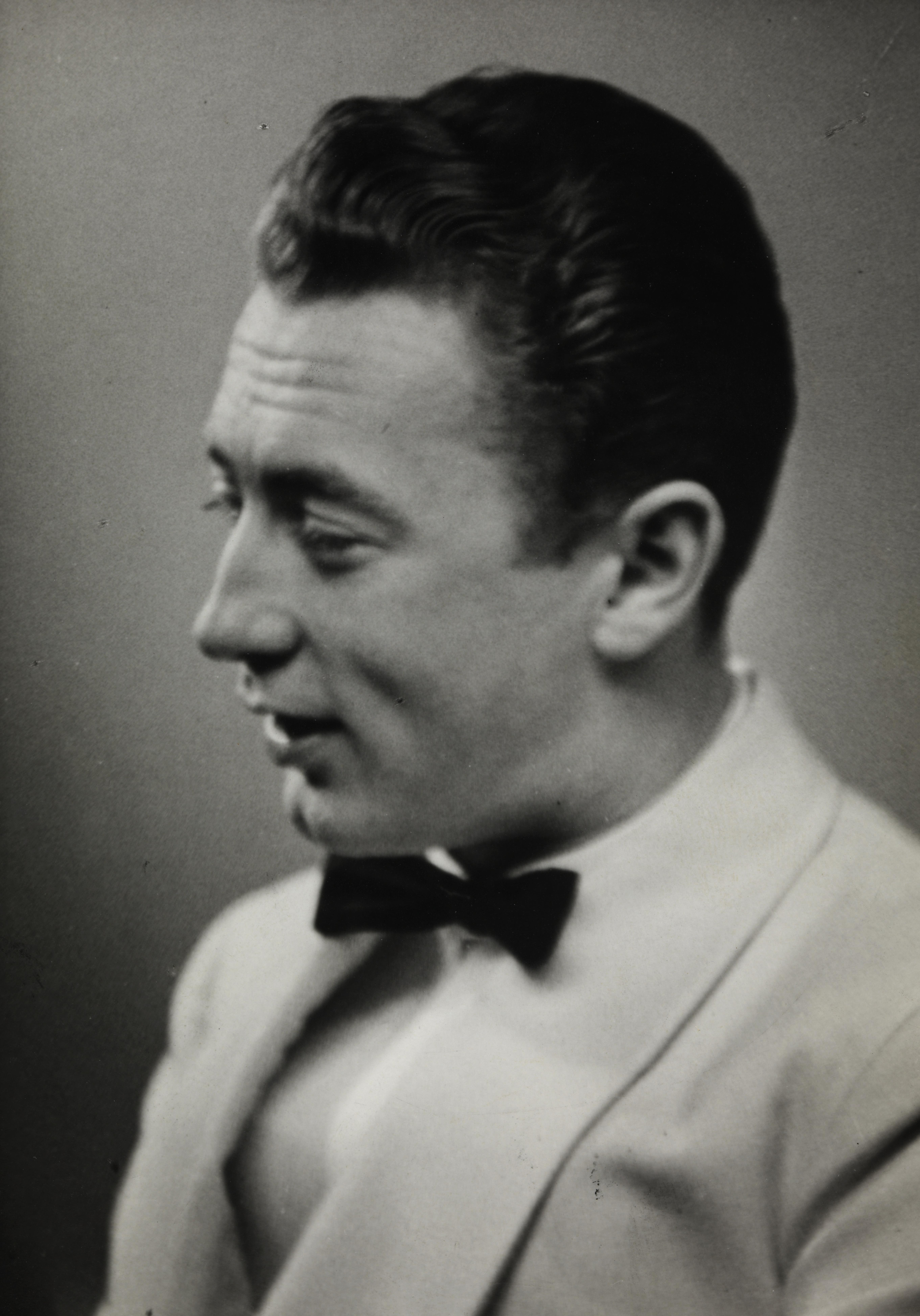
Gunnar Sønstevold

=== The arts ===
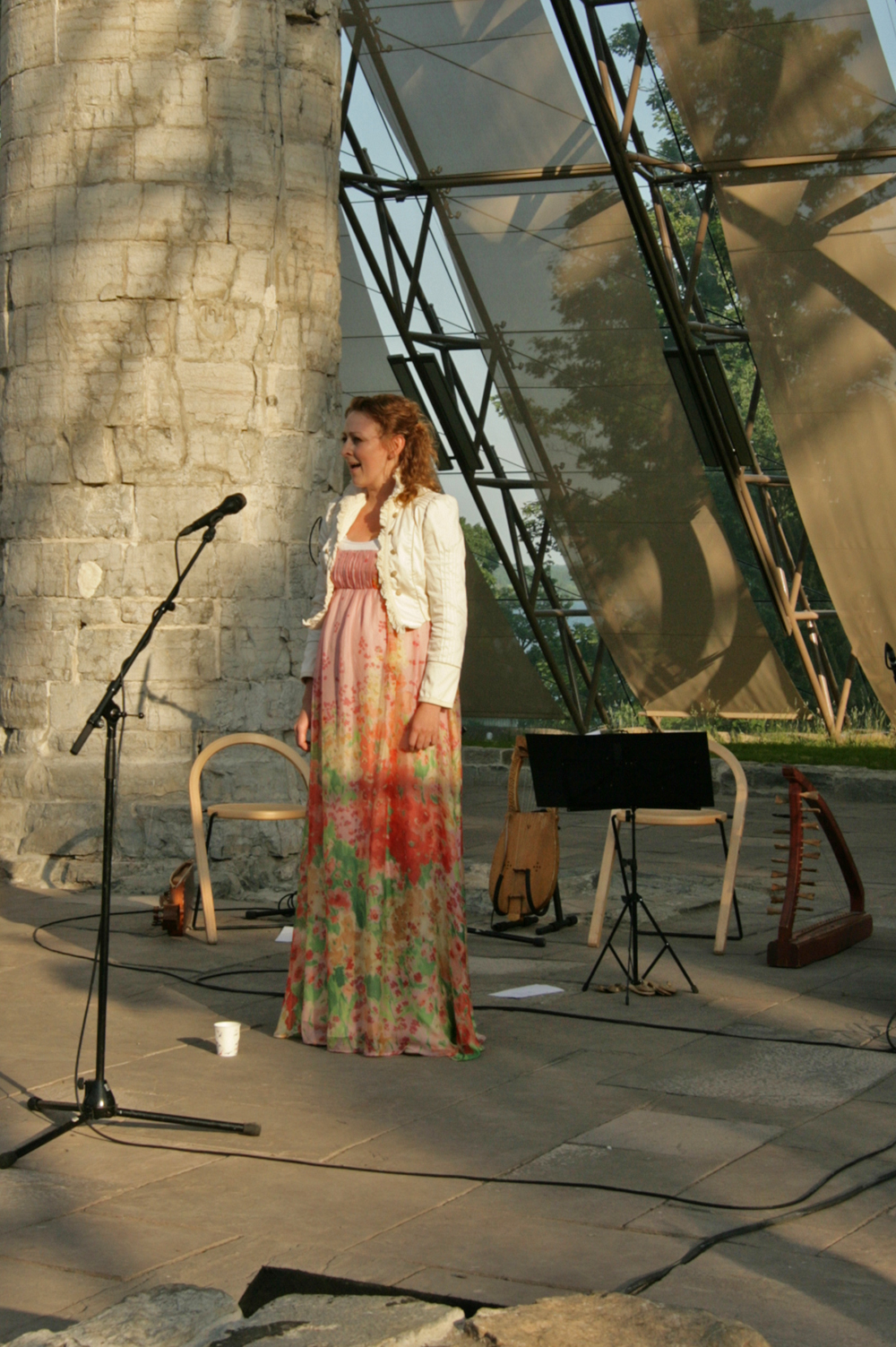
Camilla Granlien, 2008

- Gerhard Munthe (1849 in Elverum – 1929), a painter and illustrator
- Margrethe Munthe (1860 in Elverum – 1931), a children's writer, songwriter, and playwright
- Marie Hamsun (1881 in Elverum – 1969), an actress, writer, and wife of Knut Hamsun
- Åsmund Sveen (1910 in Elverum – 1963), a poet, novelist, and literary critic who was purged after WWII
- Gunnar Sønstevold (1912 in Elverum – 1991), a composer of orchestral works; vocal music; chamber music; and music to a number of plays, ballets, and films
- Dagfinn Grønoset (1920–2008), a journalist and writer who lived in Elverum
- Bjørn Ole Rasch (born 1959 in Elverum), a keyboard player, composer, and producer
- Baard Slagsvold (born 1963 in Elverum), a pop and jazz musician
- Tord Øverland Knudsen, a bass player in The Wombats (an English indie rock band formed in Liverpool in 2003)
- Rawdna Carita Eira (born 1970 in Elverum), a Norwegian and Sámi playwright and author
- Roy Khan (born 1970 in Elverum), a singer-songwriter who was the former lead singer of Kamelot
- Camilla Granlien (born 1974 in Elverum), a Norwegian folk singer, stev performer, and educator
- Sigurd Hole (born 1981 in Elverum), a jazz musician who plays upright bass
- Marcus & Martinus (born 2002 in Elverum), a pop-duo made up of twins brothers Marcus and Martinus Gunnarsen

=== Sport ===
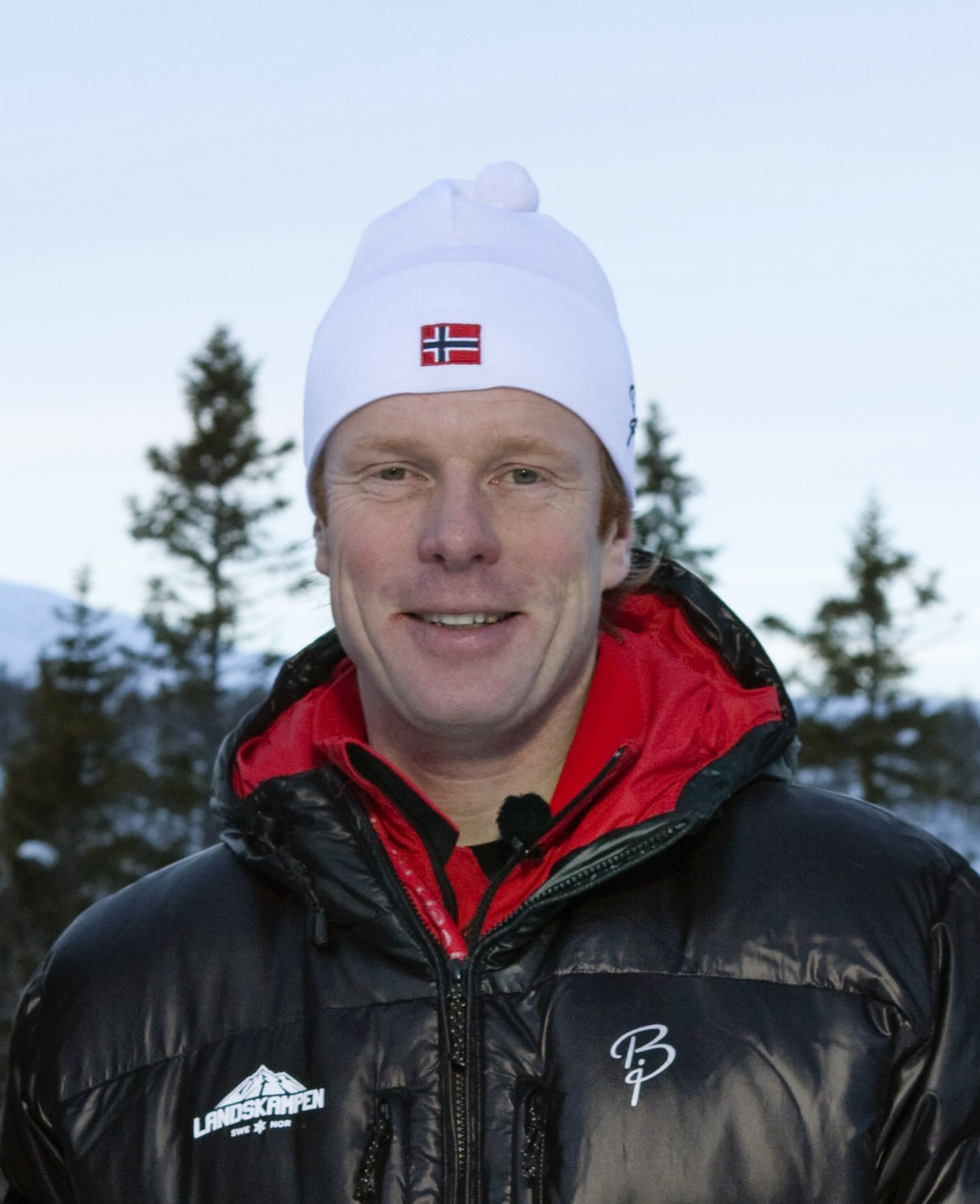
Bjørn Dæhlie, 2011

- Ole Østmo (1866 in Elverum – 1923), a sharpshooting champion who won four medals at the 1900 Summer Olympics
- Hans Anton Aalien (born 1958 in Elverum), a blind gold medalist in disabled skiing at the 1988 Winter Olympics
- Bjørn Dæhlie(born 1967 in Elverum), a retired Norwegian cross-country skier with eight gold and four silver Winter Olympic medals
- Anita Moen (born 1967), a former cross-country skier, won three silver and two bronze medals at the Winter Olympics
- Stig Inge Bjørnebye (born 1969 in Elverum), a former footballer with 317 club caps and 76 for Norway
- Rune Djurhuus (born 1970 in Elverum), a chess player and Norwegian International Grandmaster
- Gyda Ellefsplass Olssen (born 1978 in Elverum), a sport shooter who competed at the 2008 Summer Olympics
- Håvard Storbæk (born 1986 in Elverum), a former footballer with over 320 club caps
- Vegar Eggen Hedenstad (born 1991 in Elverum), a footballer with over 250 club caps

== Twin towns – sister cities ==
Elverum has sister city agreements with the following places:

- Haslev, Denmark
- Siilinjärvi, Finland
- Sunne, Sweden
- Tsumeb, Namibia
