= Elverum Church =

Church in Innlandet, Norway

- Elverum kirke
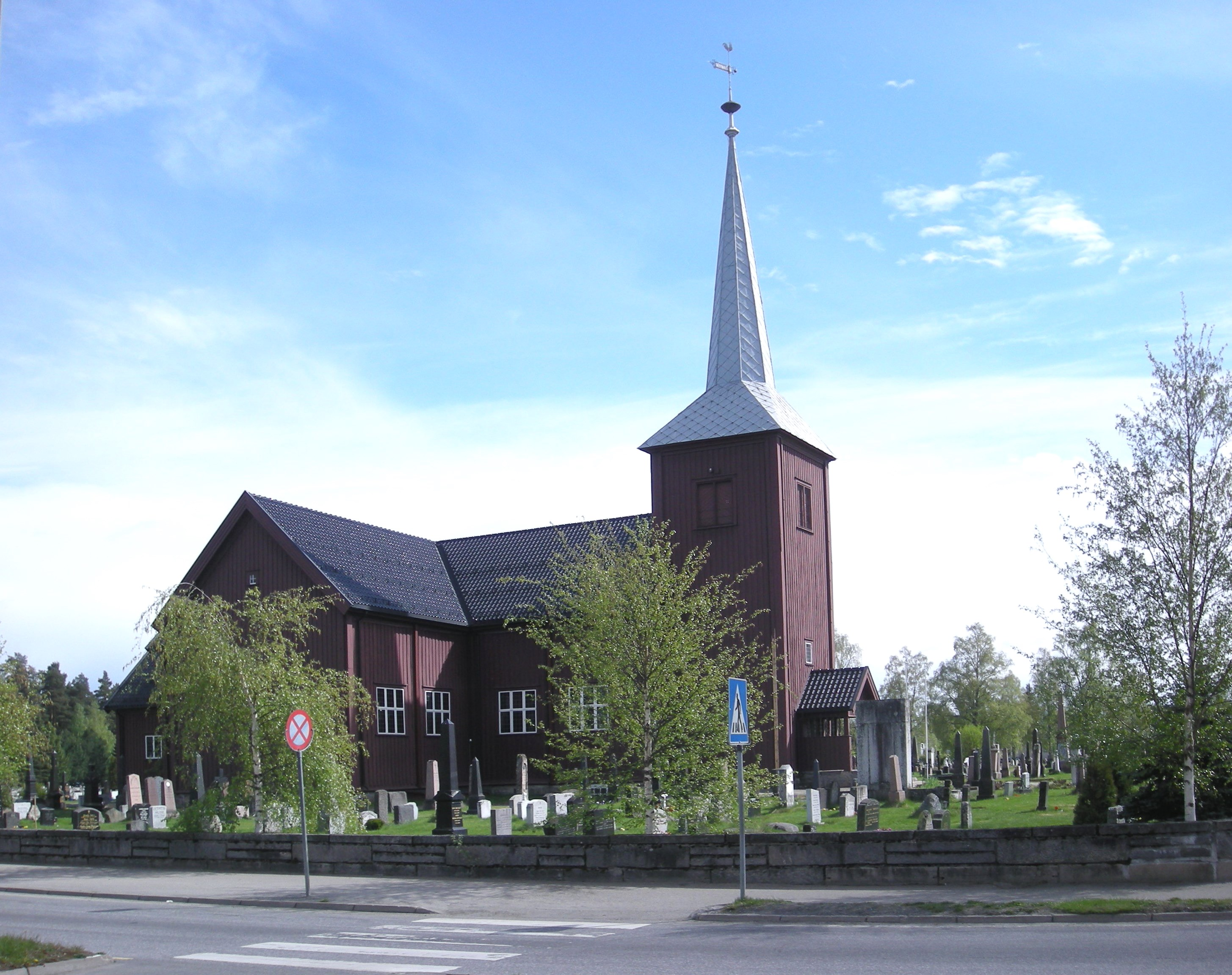
- View of the church
- Elverum Church
- 60°52′39″N 11°33′59″E
- Location: Elverum Municipality, Innlandet
- Country: Norway
- Denomination: Church of Norway
- Previous denomination: Catholic Church
- Churchmanship: Evangelical Lutheran

History
- Status: Parish church
- Founded: 13th century
- Consecrated: 28 January 1738

Architecture
- Functional status: Active
- Architect: Nicolai Gustav Sandberg
- Architectural type: Cruciform
- Completed: 1738 (288 years ago)

Specifications
- Capacity: 700
- Materials: Wood

Administration
- Diocese: Hamar bispedømme
- Deanery: Sør-Østerdal prosti
- Parish: Elverum
- Norwegian Cultural Heritage Site
- Type: Church
- Status: Automatically protected
- ID: 84092

Elverum Church (Norwegian: Elverum kirke) is a parish church of the Church of Norway in Elverum Municipality in Innlandet county, Norway. It is located in the town of Elverum. It is the church for the Elverum parish and the seat of the Sør-Østerdal prosti (deanery) in the Diocese of Hamar. The brown, wooden church was built in a cruciform design in 1738 using plans drawn up by the architect Nicolai Gustav Sandberg. The church seats about 700 people.

== History ==
The first church in Elverum was a small, wooden stave church that was probably built during the 13th century. This church was located about 240 metres (790 ft) north of the present church, roughly on the same site as the town's triangular park. During the Northern Seven Years' War, the church was looted by the invading Swedish Army. After the war, the church gradually declined into disrepair. By the early 1700s, the church roof and windows were both leaking. Around Christmastime in 1729, Morten Leigh took over as the new parish priest in Elverum. He immediately set to work on organizing support for a new church to replace the old, dilapidated building.

In 1735, the parish hired Nicolai Gustav Sandberg to design a new church and hired Even Baardset as the lead builder. A new site was chosen for the new church–about 240 metres (790 ft) to the south of the old church site. The new site offered ample room for a church and graveyard. Construction began in 1736. The church was completed in 1737 and it was consecrated on 28 January 1738. The new building had room for 700 people.

In 1814, this church served as an election church (Norwegian: valgkirke). Together with more than 300 other parish churches across Norway, it was a polling station for elections to the 1814 Norwegian Constituent Assembly which wrote the Constitution of Norway. This was Norway's first national elections. Each church parish was a constituency that elected people called "electors" who later met together in each county to elect the representatives for the assembly that was to meet at Eidsvoll Manor later that year.

In 1878, the church was extensively remodeled according to the tastes of the time using plans by Henrik Thrap-Meyer. The exterior of the church was painted white instead of the original brownish red color and the windows were replaced and made narrower. Inside, the log walls were paneled and painted white, the ceiling was raised. Almost all the old furniture was replaced, only the pulpit and the altarpiece itself were retained.

In the 1930s, there was a desire for a return to the original look of the building, however, this was difficult due to the fact that the old drawings were gone. The work was carried out in 1937-1938 under the leadership of Simen Øyen. The wall paneling was removed, uncovering the bare log walls. The old was tracked down to various places in the village and returned to the church. The windows were replaced and enlarged–regaining their original size. Also, the exterior walls were repainted. By the 1980s, the church structure was starting to sag in the corners and significant rot damage was found. In 1986, the church was closed for ten months for rehabilitation to fix the damage. Again in 2006, an extensive restoration project to again fix the structure of the building was carried out.

== Media gallery ==
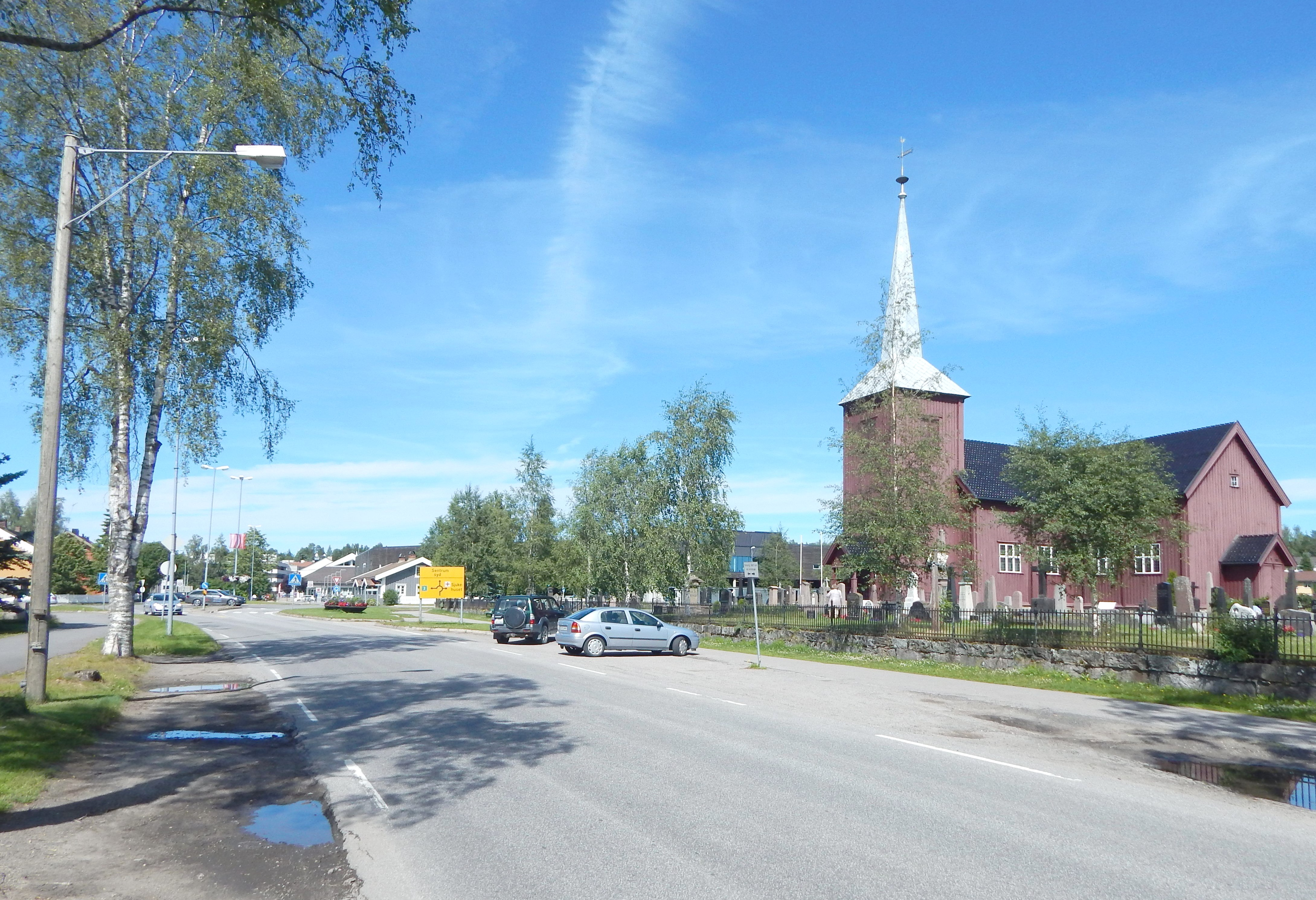

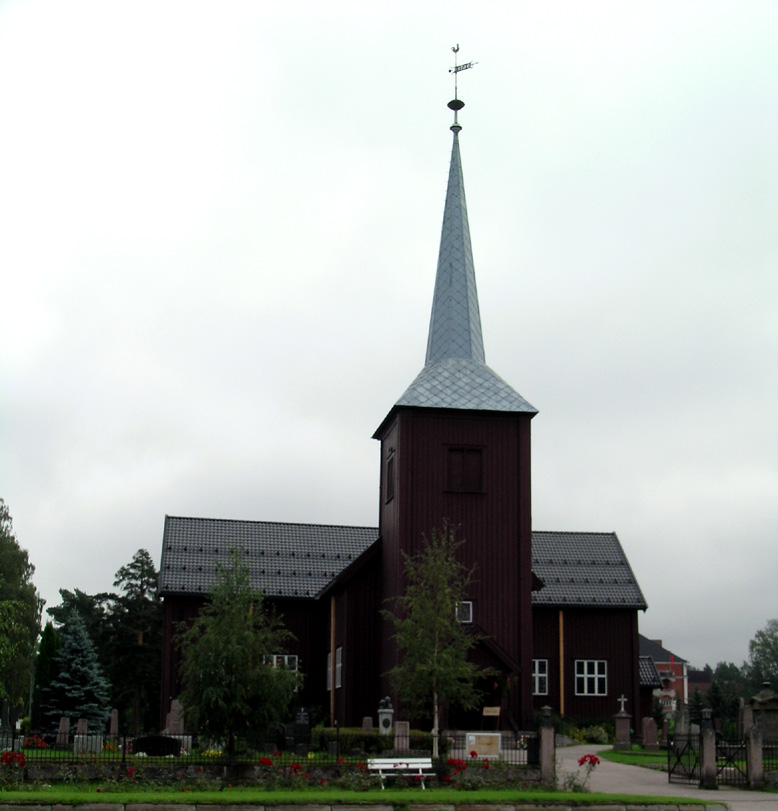

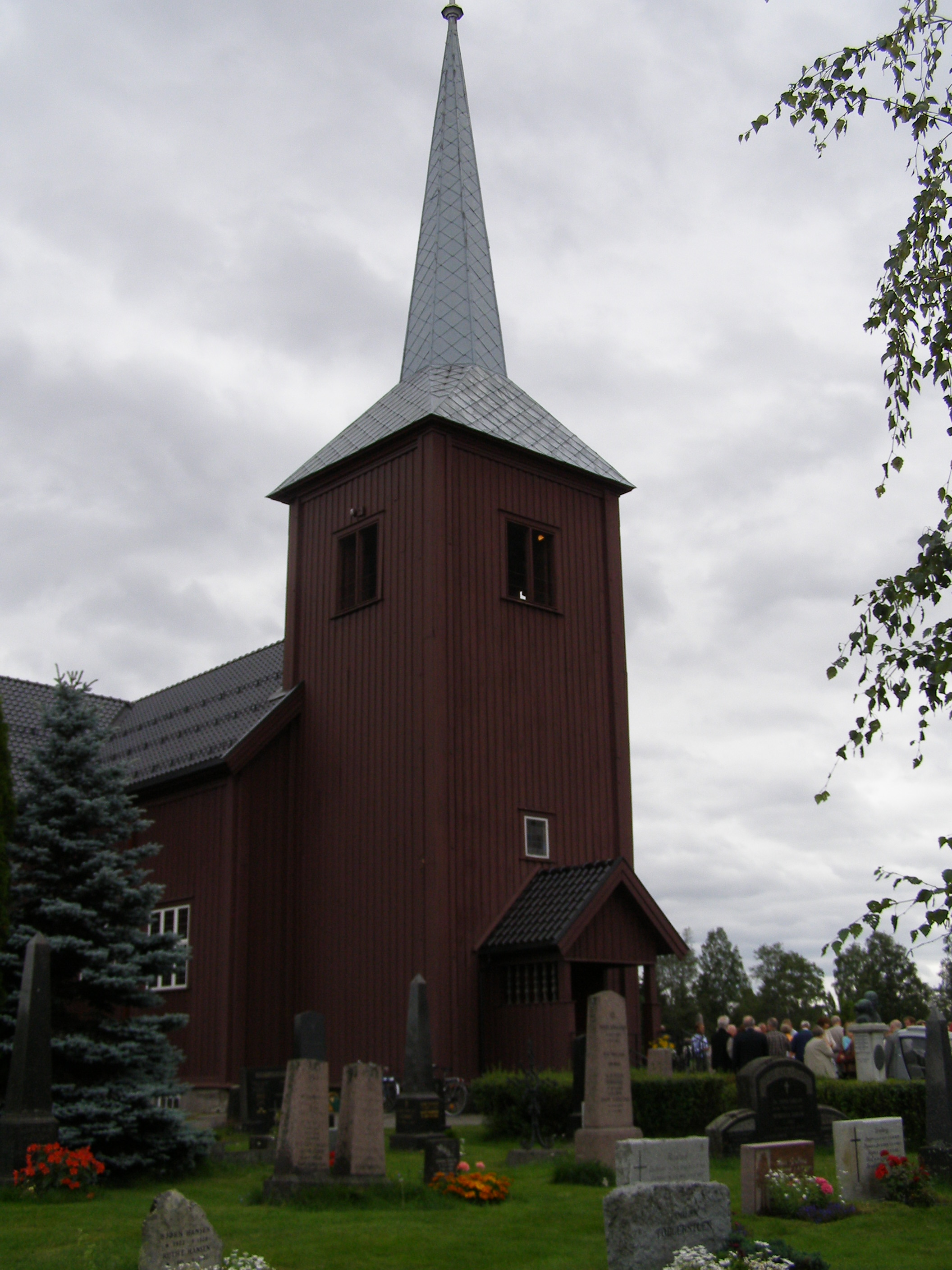

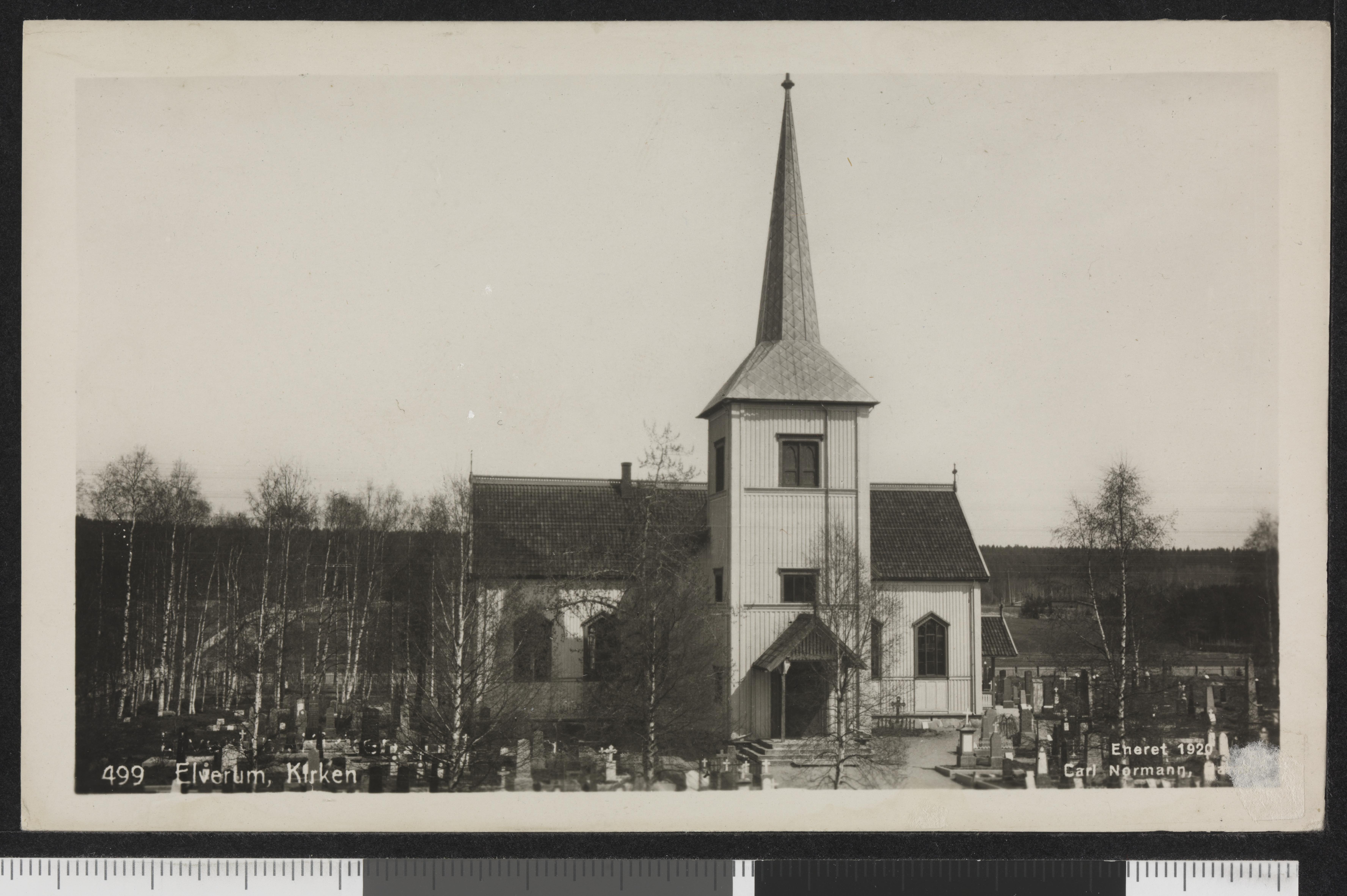

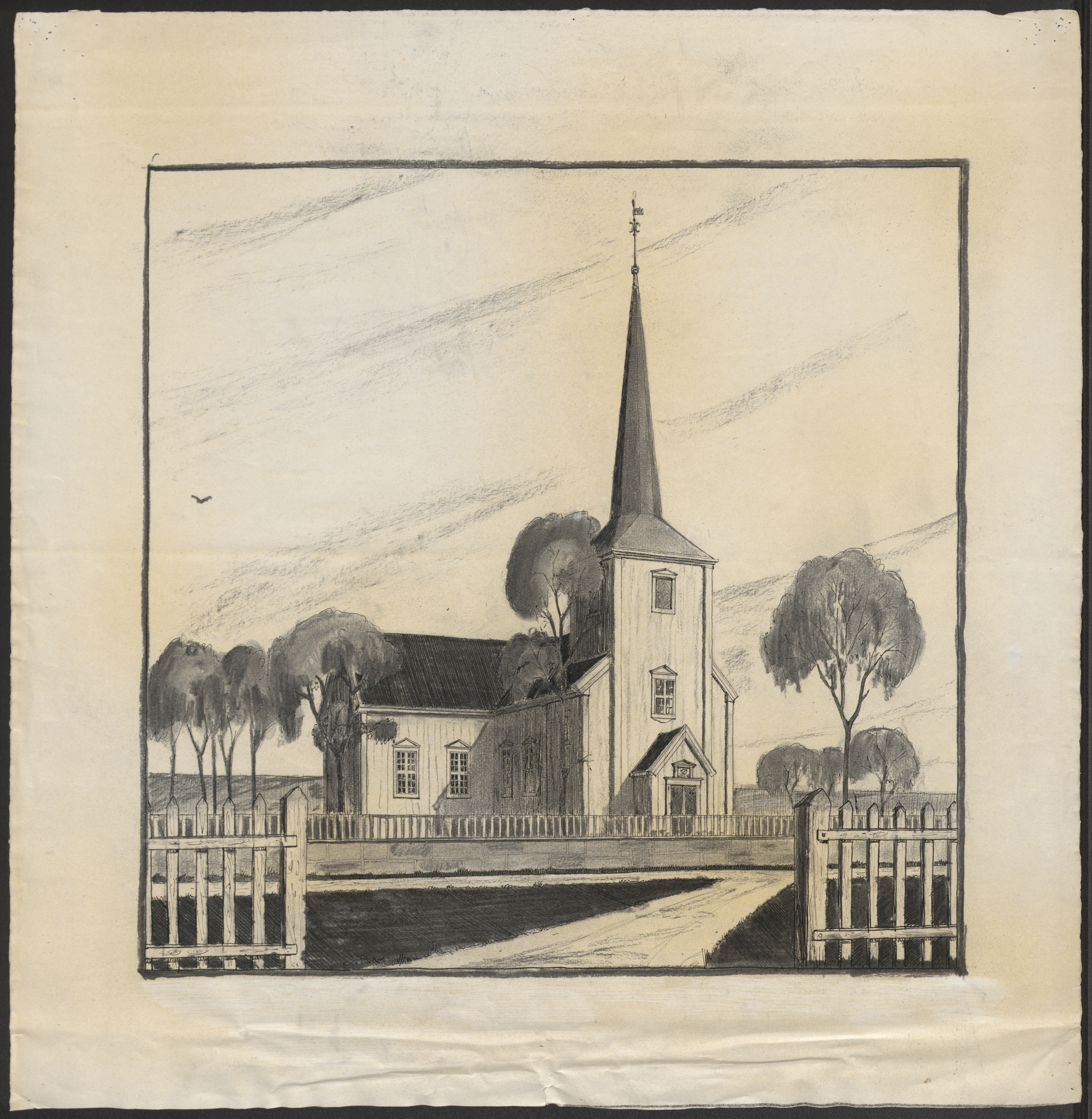

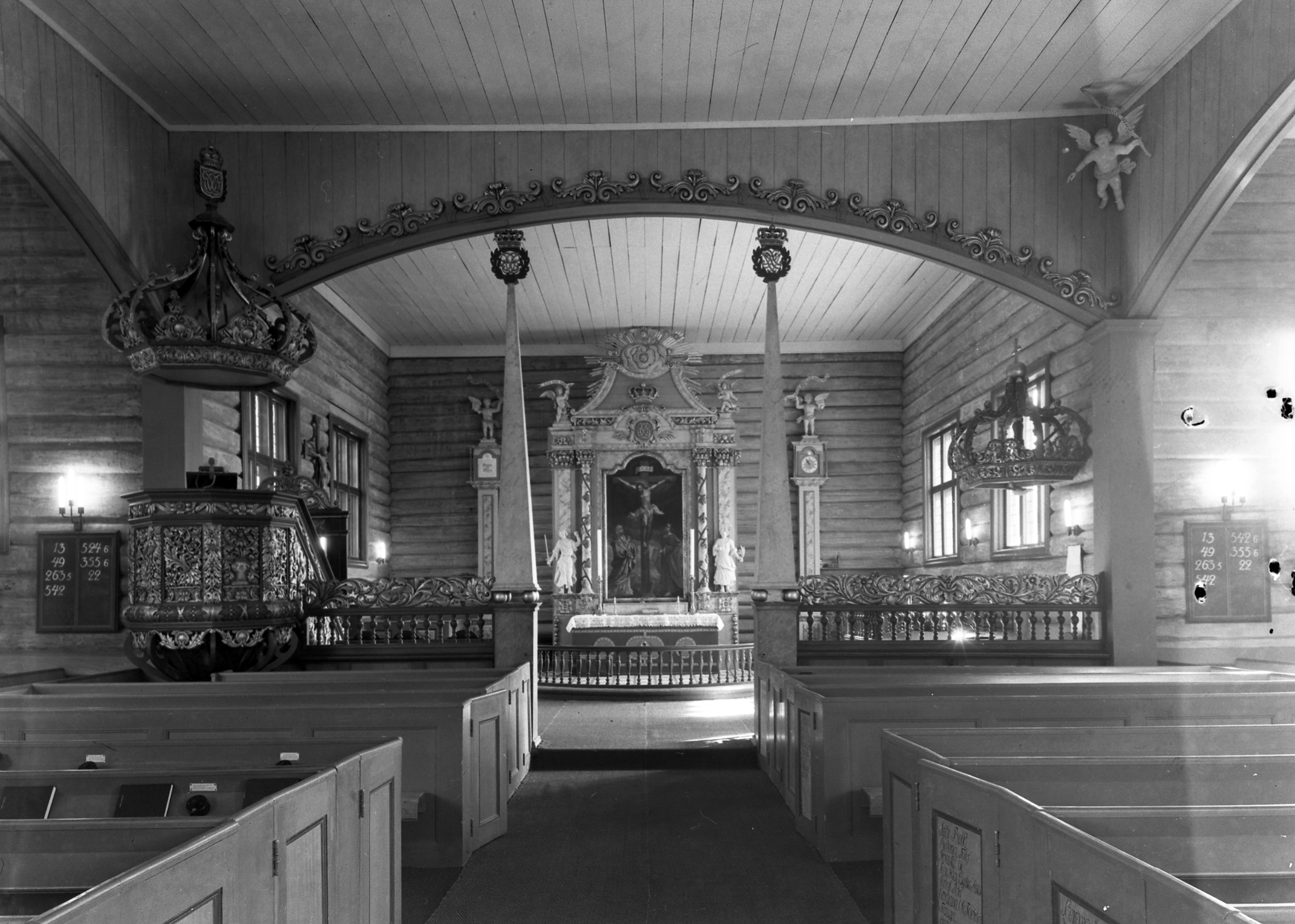

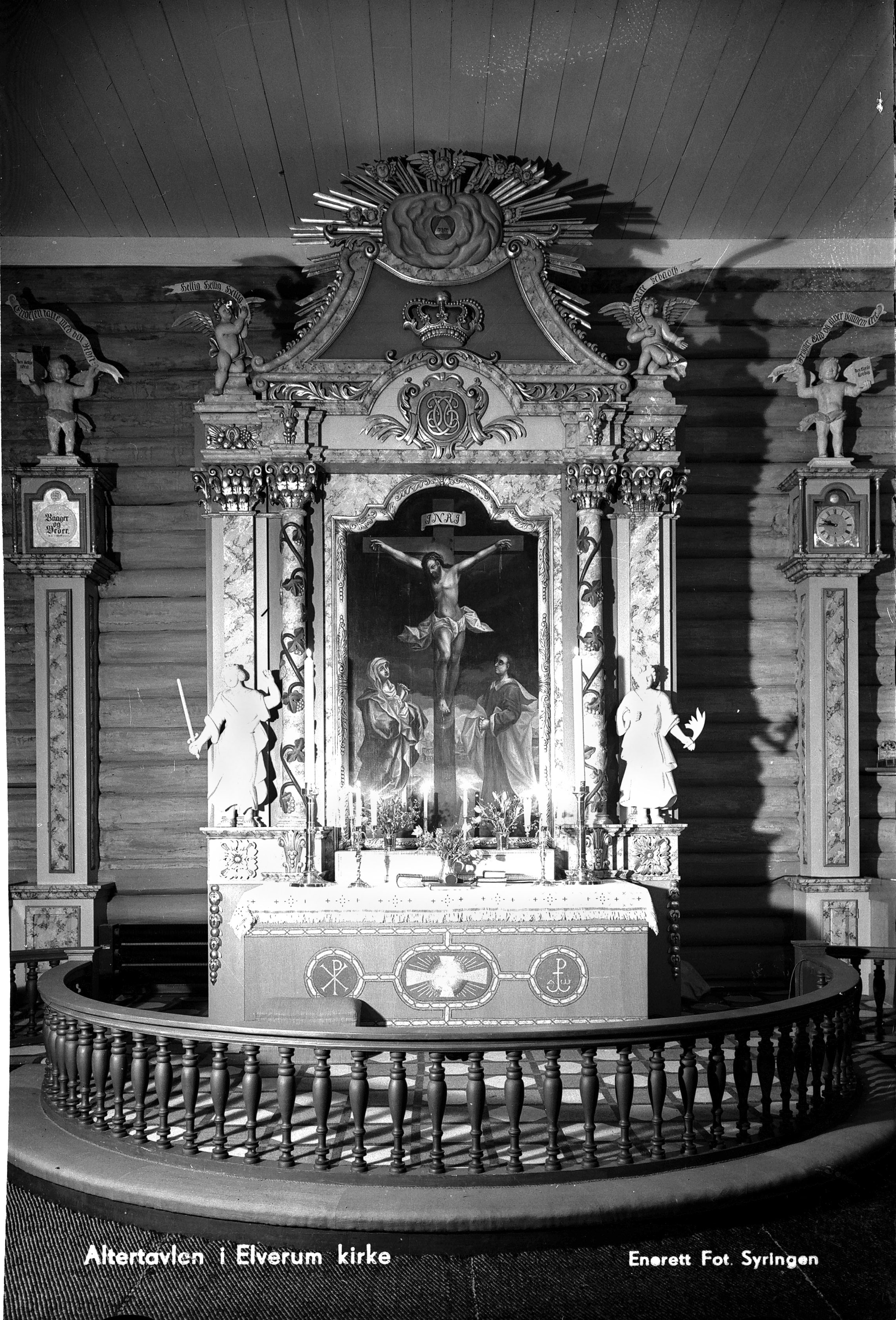

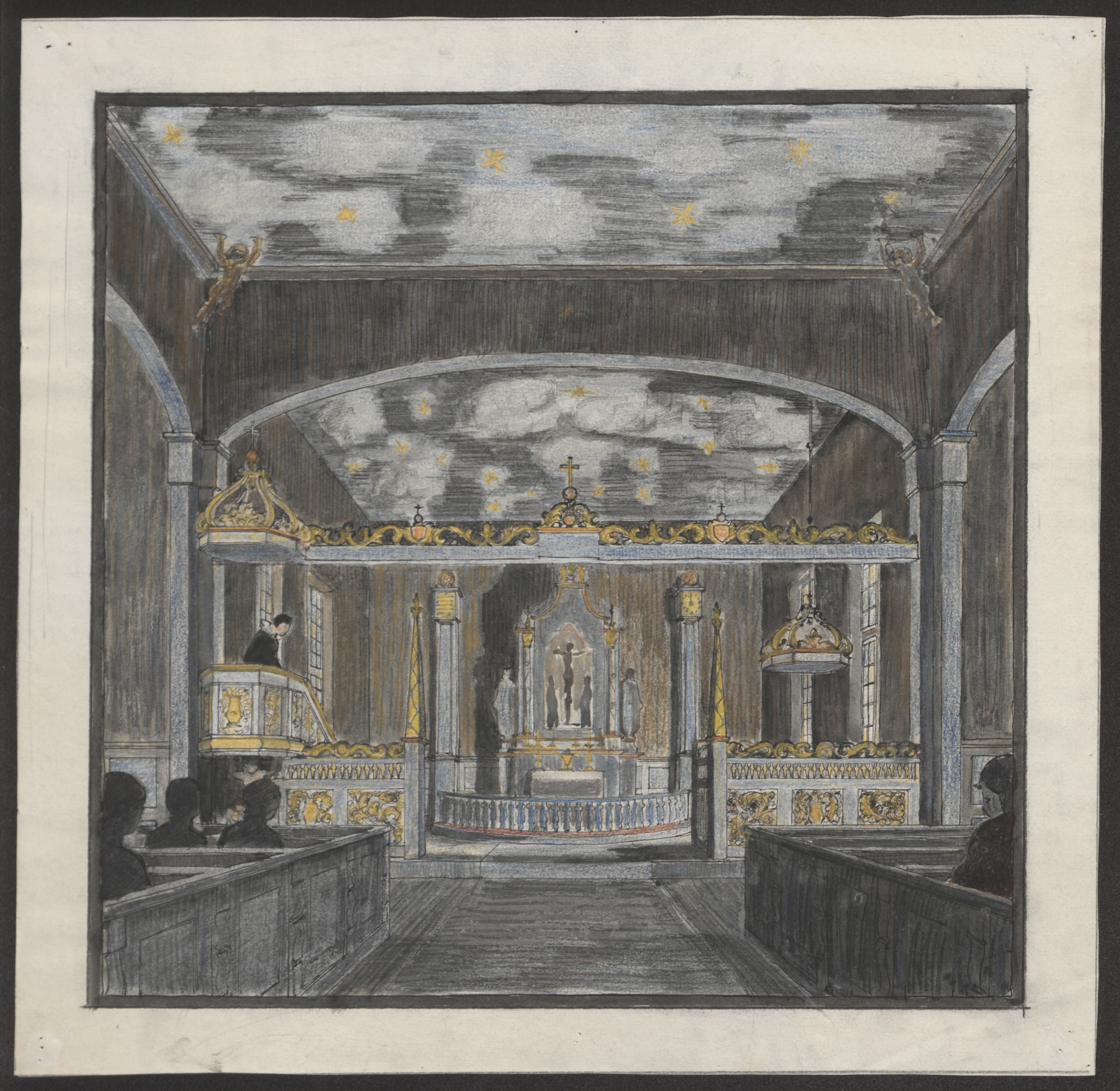

== See also ==
- List of churches in Hamar
