= Elverum (town) =

Town in Innlandet, Norway

- Town/City
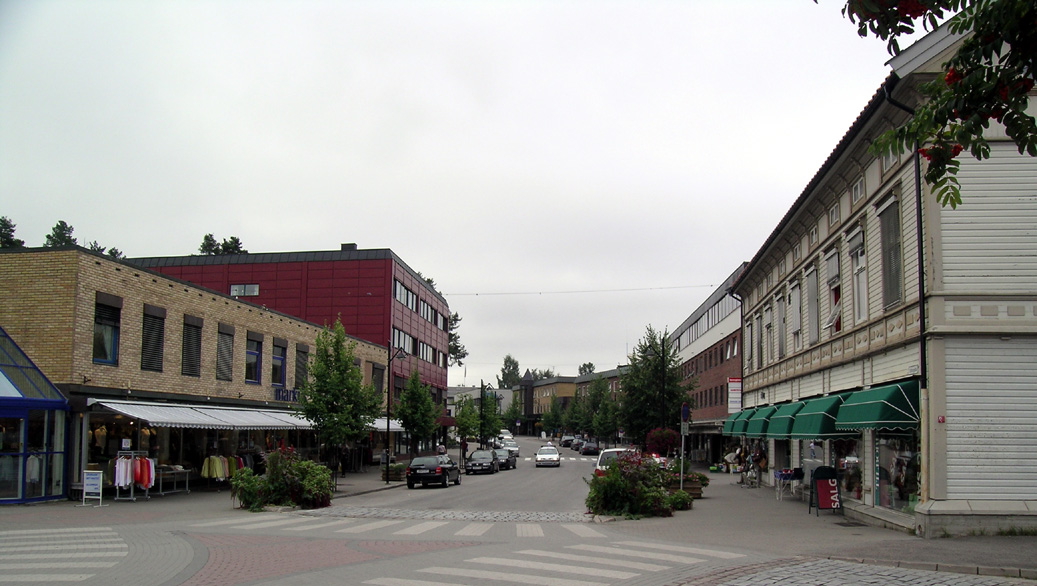
- View of the town
- Interactive map of Elverum
- Location within Innlandet Location within Norway
- Coordinates: 60.88191°N 11.56231°E
- Country: Norway
- Region: Eastern Norway
- County: Innlandet
- District: Østerdalen
- Municipality: Elverum Municipality
- Established as
- Town (By): 1 January 1996

Area
  - Total: 12.24 km^{2} (4.73 sq mi)
- Elevation: 190 m (620 ft)

Population (2024)
  - Total: 15,869
  - Density: 1,296/km^{2} (3,360/sq mi)
- Demonym: Elverumsing
- Time zone: UTC+01:00 (CET)
  - Summer (DST): UTC+02:00 (CEST)
- Post Code: 2414 Elverum

Elverum (Norwegian: [ˈɛlvərɵm]) is a town in Elverum Municipality in Innlandet county, Norway. The town is the administrative centre of the municipality. It is located in the western part of the municipality along the river Glomma, about 30 kilometres (19 mi) east of the town of Hamar. The town is the regional centre for commerce and industry for the middle Østerdalen valley and the northern part of Solør. The old village of Elverum has grown over the years and in 1996, the municipal council of Elverum Municipality granted the urban village of Elverum town status.

The 12.24-square-kilometre (3,020-acre) town has a population (2024) of 15,869 and a population density of 1,296 inhabitants per square kilometre (3,360/sq mi).

The town is located on both sides of the river Glomma. The eastern side of the river is referred to as Leiret. This is where the main commercial area is as well as Elverum Church, Elverum Hospital, Inland Norway University of Applied Sciences, the municipal hall, and other governmental buildings. This area grew up around the Christiansfjell Fortress that was built during the 1680s. The west side of the town is referred to as Vestad. This is where the industrial area is located as well as the Glomdal Museum and the Terningmoen military base. This is also the site of the Elverum Station where the Rørosbanen and Solørbanen railway lines meet.

== History ==
=== Military ties ===
During the Nordic Seven Years' War (1563–1570), Swedish troops invaded Norway in a number of locations, including a number of incursions into Østerdalen. In 1563, Norwegian troops stopped the Swedish advance at Elverum, which provided a strategic point since it lay on both north-south and east–west trade and travel routes.

Construction of fortifications started in 1673 during the Gyldenløve War as Hammersberg Skanse. It was renamed Christiansfjeld Fortress in 1685 by King Christian V of Denmark during his visit to Hammersberg Skanse on 14 June. Although the fortress was manned through the Great Northern War, the area was spared major battles. In 1742, Christiansfjeld Fortress was closed.

A Norwegian infantry regiment, the Oppland Regiment, was formed in 1657 and Elverum became a garrison. The present-day area of Elverum located east of the river is called Leiret (lit. 'the camp') and this area is adjacent to the old Christiansfjeld Fortress. This area was built up by soldiers as well as the merchants and craftsmen who settled in a camp near the fortress.

In 1878, Terningmoen at Elverum became the home base for the Oppland Regiment and an infantry school was founded here in 1896.

The Oppland Regiment had a history which included courageous involvement in combat from the Swedish wars of the 17th century through the German invasion of Norway in 1940. As part of the general restructuring, the unit was disbanded in 2002.

=== Regional market ===
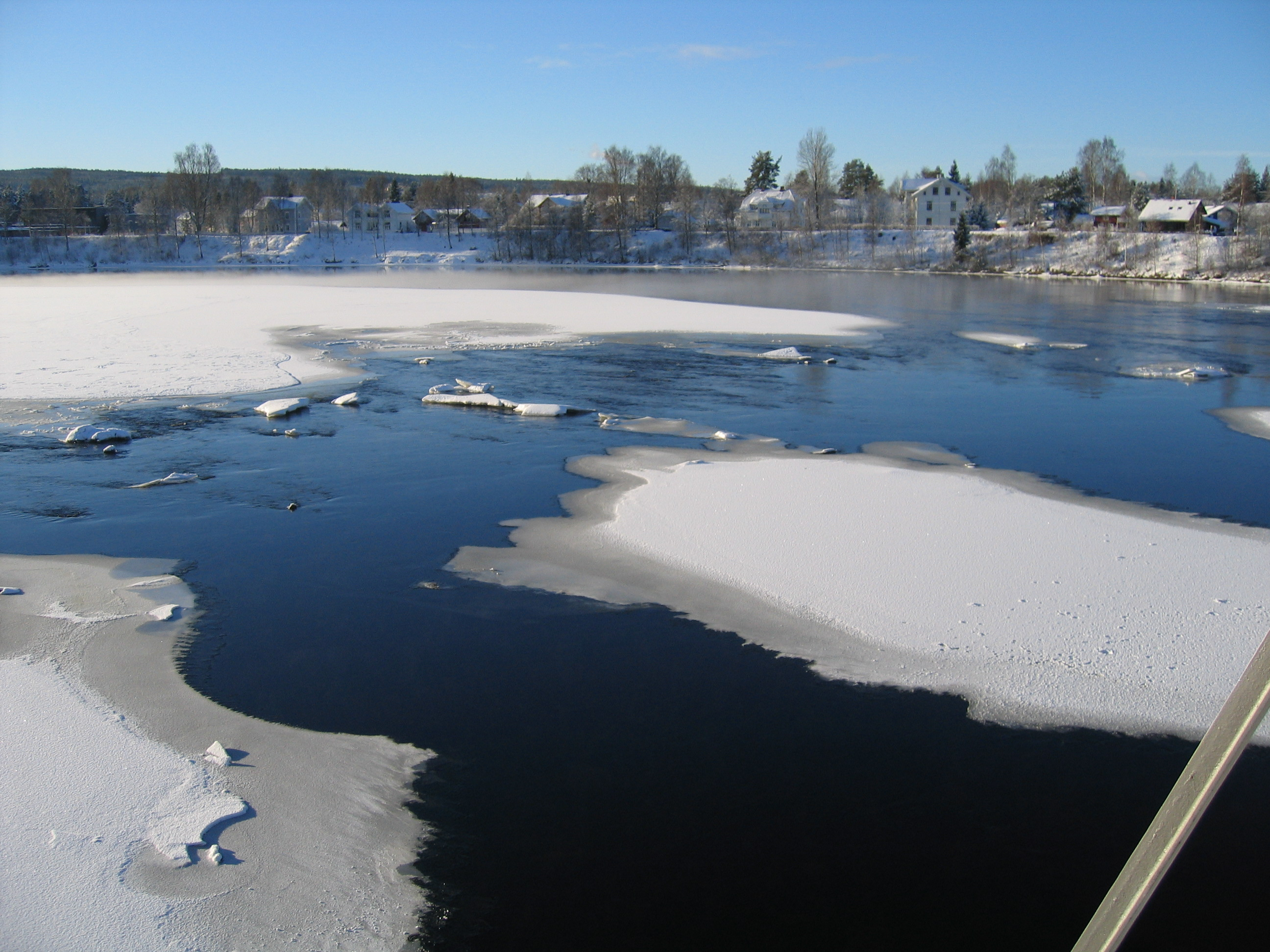
View of the west side of the river Glomma from Gammelbrua

In the Danish-Norwegian period, Elverum was the location for a bailiff (fogd), a judge (sorenskriver), a church provost (prost), and numerous military officers.

It became important as a market town as well. In 1570 Hamar Cathedral in Hamar was burned and Hamarhus castle was destroyed by the Swedish armies during the Seven Years' War with Sweden. Hamar lost its city status, leaving no kjøpstad, or official market city, between Christiania and Trondheim. Eastern Norway needed an organized market for trading goods. The Grundset market (Grundsetmart'n) in Elverum grew to meet the need. It is recorded as existing in the 17th century, and in 1765 the owner of Gaarder obtained special market privileges from the king, to take place six miles north of the population center of Elverum on his estate. By 1767, it was described as Norway's largest and most famous market. In the first week of March, for almost 300 years, the folks of the district met to trade and to celebrate. People from Gudbrandsdal, Oslo, Trøndelag, and Sweden also regularly came to Grundsetmart'n. The Grundset market was finally abandoned in 1901, when pressures of the railroad and other markets made it superfluous.

== Elverum Church ==
Elverum Church (Elverum kirke) is a cruciform church. The church was built in 1736 and inaugurated in 1738. The edifice is of wood and has 700 seats. The church was greatly changed in 1878 under the leadership of architect Henrik Thrap-Meyer. In 1937–1938, the interior from the 1700s was restored with the windows and entrance doors returned to the original shape. The decorative leaf decor in the chancel was completed and galleries reconstructed.

== Sport ==
The local handball Elverum Håndball is one of the most successful teams in Norway.

== See also ==
- List of towns and cities in Norway
