= Schulerud =

Schulerud is a Norwegian surname. Notable people with the surname include:

- Ingrid Schulerud (born 1959), Norwegian diplomat
- Mentz Schulerud (1915–2003), Norwegian author, radio personality, and theatre director
- Anne-Cath. Vestly, born Schulerud
