= Vestly =

Vestly is a surname. Notable people with the surname include:

- Anne-Cath. Vestly (1920–2008), Norwegian author of children's literature
- Johan Vestly (1923–1993), Norwegian illustrator, artist, and film producer
