= Narud =

Narud is a Norwegian surname. Notable people with the surname include:

- Hanne Marthe Narud (1958–2012), Norwegian political scientist
- Ole Gustav Narud (born 1958), Norwegian politician
- Odd Narud (1919–2000), Norwegian businessman
