= Åmot Municipality =

Municipality in Innlandet, Norway

Åmot Municipality Åmot kommune
- Municipality
- Aamot herred (historic name)
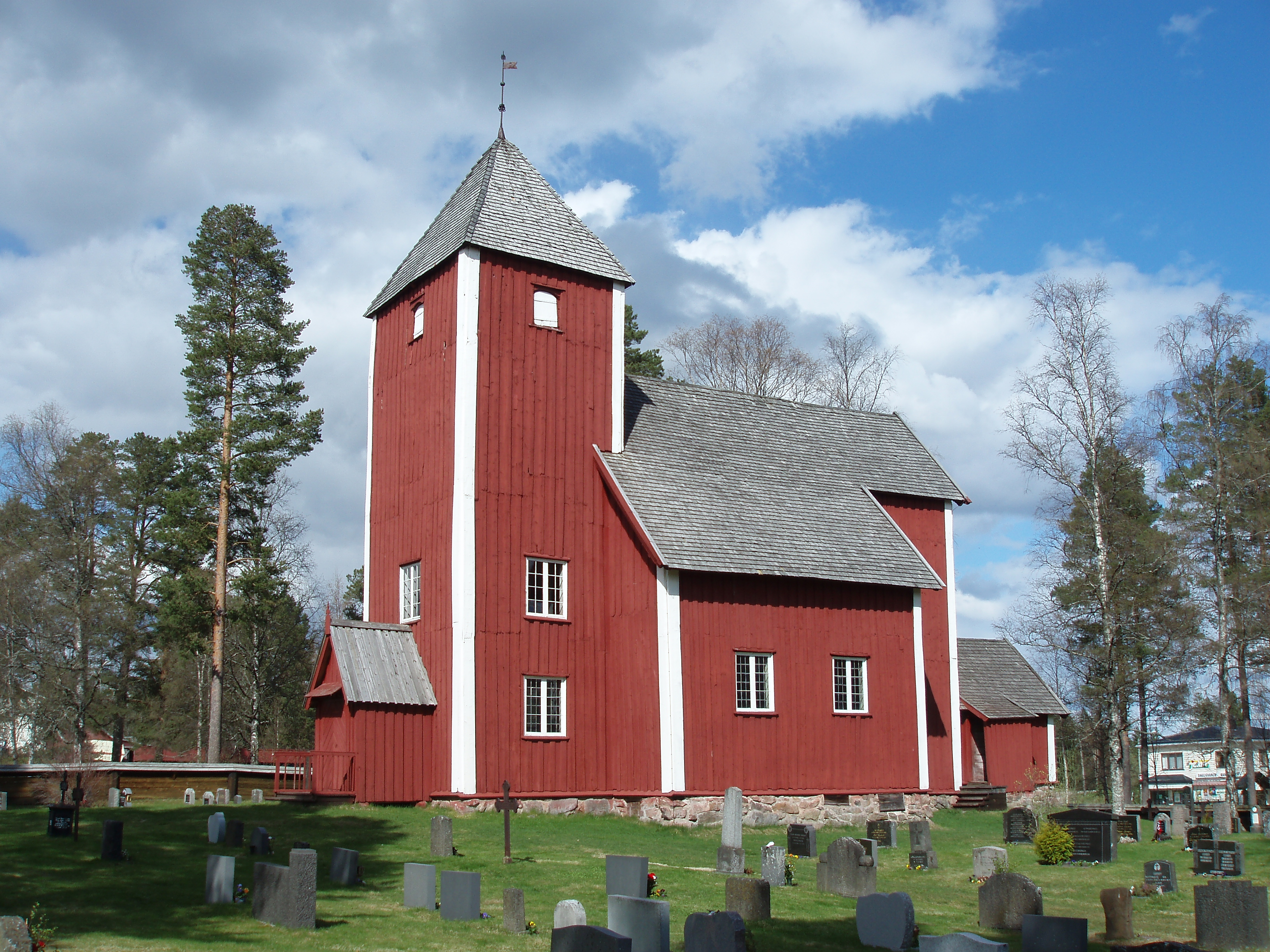
- View of the Old Nordre Osen Church

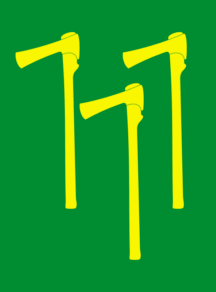
- Flag Coat of arms

- Innlandet within Norway

- Åmot within Innlandet
- Coordinates: 61°8′47″N 11°24′57″E
- Country: Norway
- County: Innlandet
- District: Østerdalen
- Established: 1 January 1838
  - Created as: Formannskapsdistrikt
- Administrative centre: Rena

Government
  - Mayor (2019): Ole Erik Hørstad (H)

Area
  - Total: 1,339.91 km^{2} (517.34 sq mi)
  - Land: 1,293.32 km^{2} (499.35 sq mi)
  - Water: 46.59 km^{2} (17.99 sq mi) 3.5%
  - Rank: #72 in Norway
- Highest elevation: 1,057.31 m (3,468.9 ft)

Population (2025)
  - Total: 4,205
  - Rank: #200 in Norway
  - Density: 3.1/km^{2} (8.0/sq mi)
  - Change (10 years): ▼ −3.7%
- Demonym: Åmoting

Official language
  - Norwegian form: Bokmål
- Time zone: UTC+01:00 (CET)
  - Summer (DST): UTC+02:00 (CEST)
- ISO 3166 code: NO-3422
- Website: Official website

Åmot is a municipality in Innlandet county, Norway. It is located in the traditional district of Østerdalen. The administrative centre of the municipality is the village of Rena. Other villages in the municipality include Åsta, Osneset, and Snippen.

The 1,340-square-kilometre (520 sq mi) municipality is the 72nd largest by area out of the 357 municipalities in Norway. Åmot is the 200th most populous municipality in Norway with a population of 4,205. The municipality's population density is 3.1 inhabitants per square kilometre (8.0/sq mi) and its population has decreased by 3.7% over the previous 10-year period.

Cultural history: In 2026, the Rena hoard, a coin hoard was found.

== General information ==
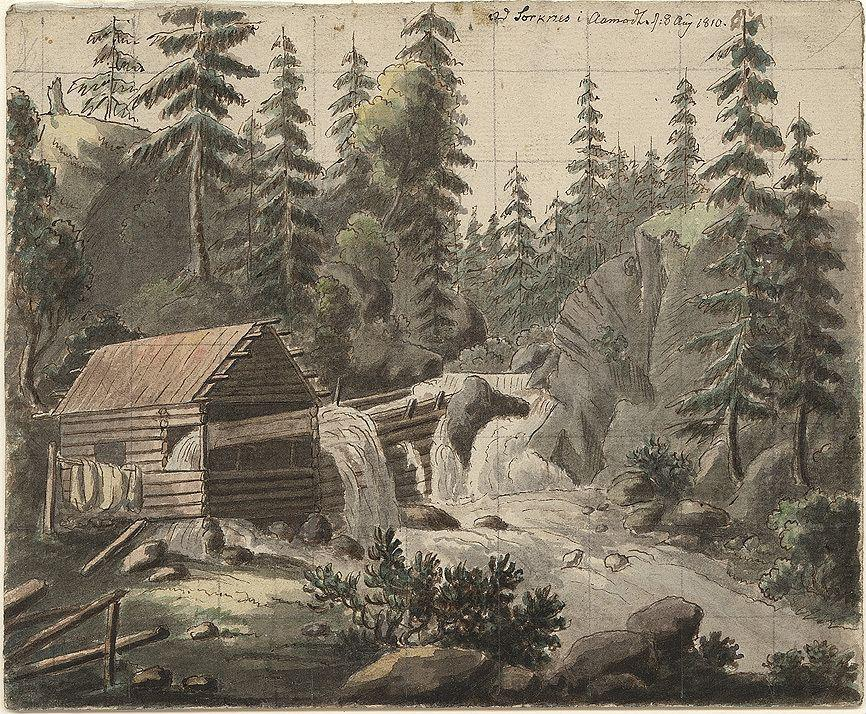
Painting of Åmot from 1810

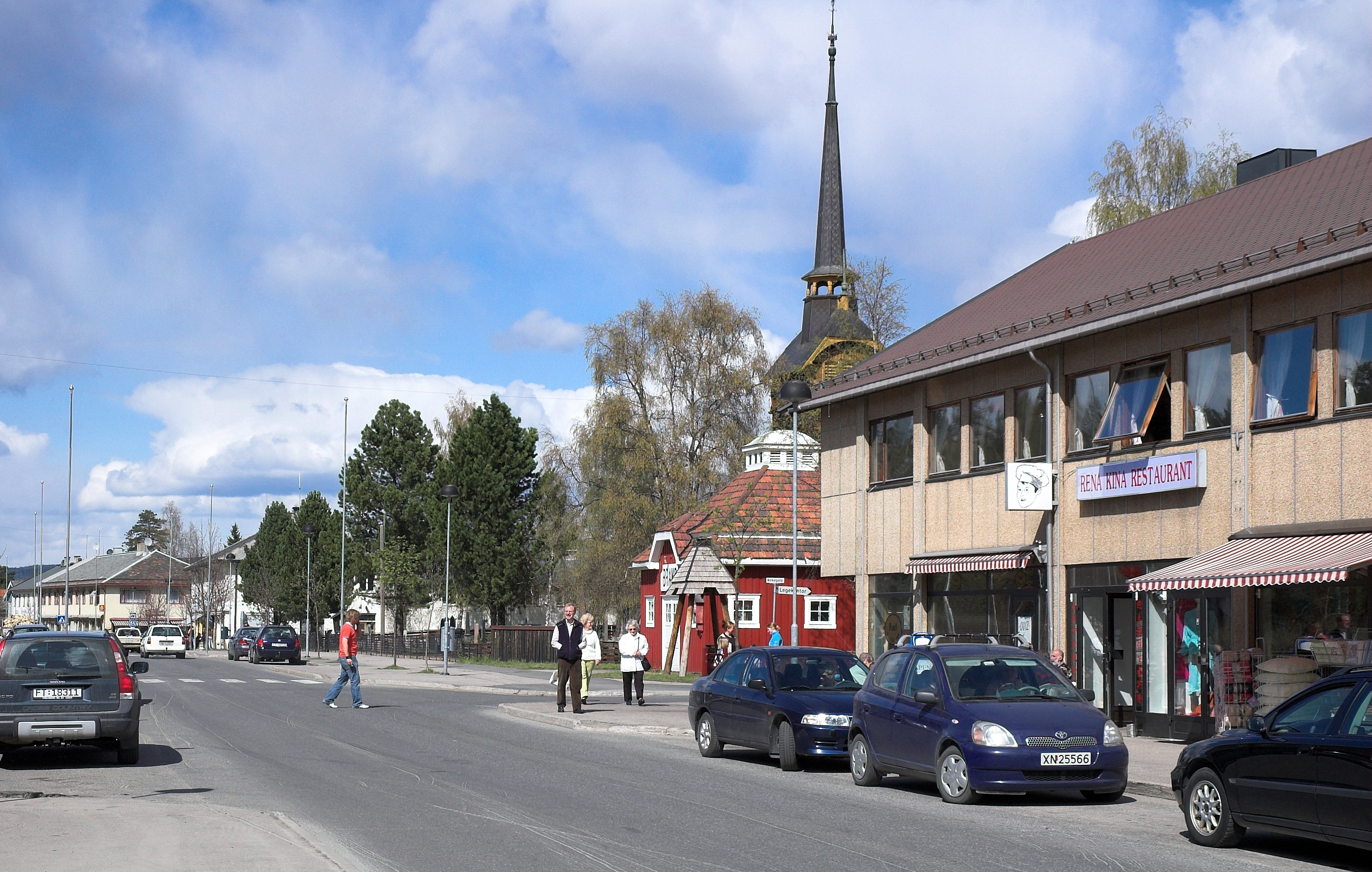
View of the centre of Rena

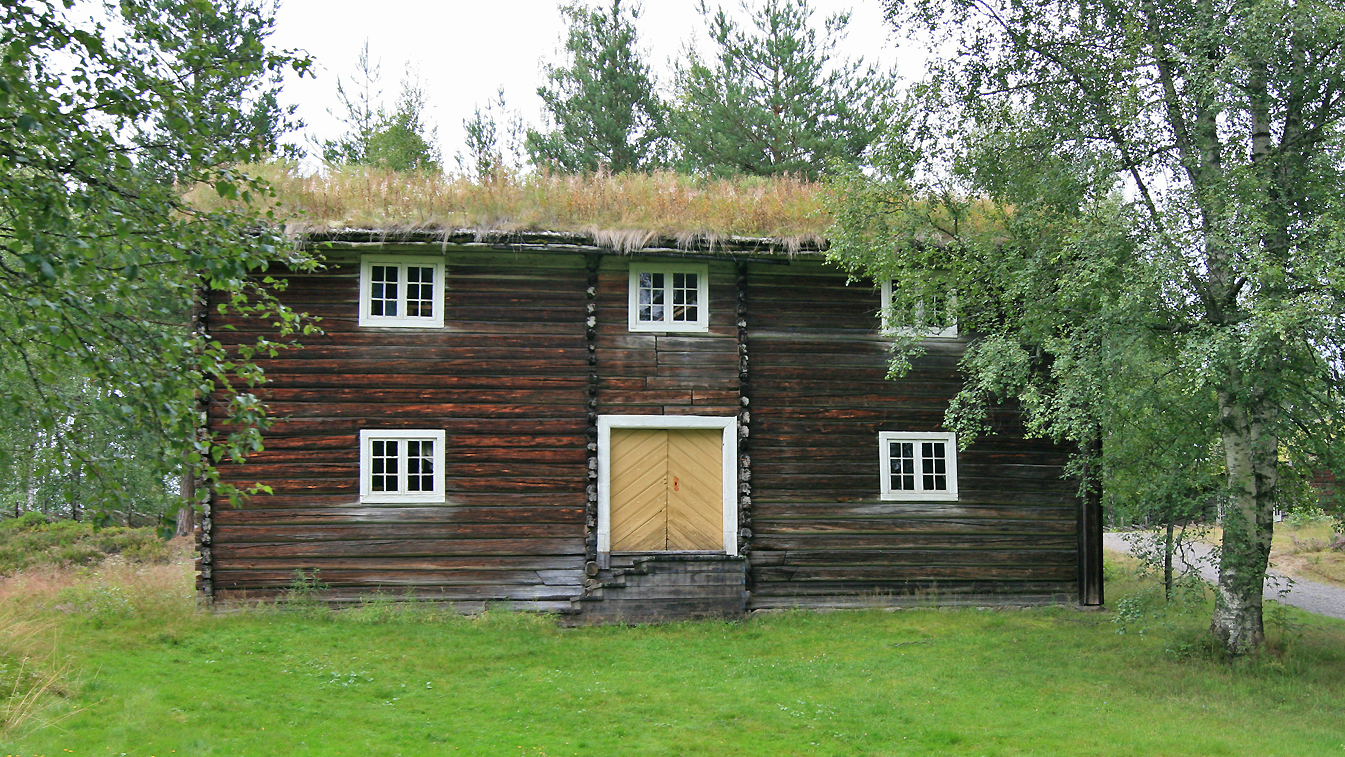
Bergerloftet museum

The parish of Aamot (later spelled Åmot) was established as a municipality on 1 January 1838 (see formannskapsdistrikt law). In 1880, the Nordre Osen area of Trysil Municipality (population: 302) was transferred into Åmot Municipality. The municipal borders have not changed since that time.

Historically, the municipality was part of Hedmark county. On 1 January 2020, the municipality became a part of the newly-formed Innlandet county (after Hedmark and Oppland counties were merged).

=== Name ===
The municipality (originally the parish) is named after the old Åmot farm (Old Norse: Ámót) since the first Åmot Church was built there. The first element is á which means "river". The last element is mót which means "meeting" or "joint". Thus the name means the meeting of the rivers; in this case it is referring to the confluence of the rivers Glomma and Rena. On 21 December 1917, a royal resolution enacted the 1917 Norwegian language reforms. Prior to this change, the name was spelled Aamot with the digraph "Aa", and after this reform, the name was spelled Åmot, using the letter Å instead.

=== Coat of arms ===
The coat of arms was granted on 26 February 1988. The official blazon is "Vert, three axes palewise Or" (Norwegian: I grønt tre opprette gull økser, 2-1). This means the arms have a green field (background) and the charge is a set of three axes. The charge has a tincture of Or which means it is commonly colored yellow, but if it is made out of metal, then gold is used. The design symbolizes the importance and history of the logging industry in the area. For hundreds of years, forestry, together with agriculture, has been the most important source of income in the municipality. The ax that is in the design is called a running axe or narrow axe. It was used by log drivers when they had to chain logs together for transport. The arms were designed by John Digernes. The municipal flag has the same design as the coat of arms.

=== Churches ===
The Church of Norway has three parishes (sokn) within Åmot Municipality. It is part of the Sør-Østerdal prosti (deanery) in the Diocese of Hamar.

Churches in Åmot
Parish (sokn)	Church name	Location of the church	Year built
Deset	Deset Church	Deset	1867
Nordre Osen	Nordre Osen Church	Osneset	1923
Nordre Osen	Old Nordre Osen Church	Osneset	1777
Åmot	Åmot Church	Rena	1901

=== Education ===
Åmot has four schools: Åmot Ungdomsskole (Åmot Lower secondary school), Rena Barneskole, Deset Oppvekstsenter, and Osen Oppvekstsenter.

== Government ==
Åmot Municipality is responsible for primary education (through 10th grade), outpatient health services, senior citizen services, welfare and other social services, zoning, economic development, and municipal roads and utilities. The municipality is governed by a municipal council of directly elected representatives. The mayor is indirectly elected by a vote of the municipal council. The municipality is under the jurisdiction of the Hedmarken og Østerdal District Court and the Eidsivating Court of Appeal.

=== Municipal council ===
The municipal council (Kommunestyre) of Åmot Municipality is made up of 19 representatives that are elected to four year terms. The tables below show the current and historical composition of the council by political party.

Åmot kommunestyre 2023–2027
Party name (in Norwegian)	Number of representatives
Labour Party (Arbeiderpartiet)	3
Progress Party (Fremskrittspartiet)	2
Conservative Party (Høyre)	8
Centre Party (Senterpartiet)	4
Socialist Left Party (Sosialistisk Venstreparti)	2
Total number of members:	19

Åmot kommunestyre 2019–2023
Party name (in Norwegian)	Number of representatives
Labour Party (Arbeiderpartiet)	6
Progress Party (Fremskrittspartiet)	1
Conservative Party (Høyre)	2
Centre Party (Senterpartiet)	8
Socialist Left Party (Sosialistisk Venstreparti)	2
Total number of members:	19

Åmot kommunestyre 2015–2019
Party name (in Norwegian)	Number of representatives
Labour Party (Arbeiderpartiet)	5
Progress Party (Fremskrittspartiet)	1
Conservative Party (Høyre)	2
Centre Party (Senterpartiet)	9
Socialist Left Party (Sosialistisk Venstreparti)	2
Total number of members:	19

Åmot kommunestyre 2011–2015
Party name (in Norwegian)	Number of representatives
Labour Party (Arbeiderpartiet)	7
Progress Party (Fremskrittspartiet)	2
Conservative Party (Høyre)	3
Pensioners' Party (Pensjonistpartiet)	1
Centre Party (Senterpartiet)	8
Socialist Left Party (Sosialistisk Venstreparti)	1
Liberal Party (Venstre)	1
Total number of members:	23

Åmot kommunestyre 2007–2011
Party name (in Norwegian)	Number of representatives
Labour Party (Arbeiderpartiet)	4
Progress Party (Fremskrittspartiet)	2
Conservative Party (Høyre)	1
Centre Party (Senterpartiet)	8
Socialist Left Party (Sosialistisk Venstreparti)	1
Liberal Party (Venstre)	1
Total number of members:	17

Åmot kommunestyre 2003–2007
Party name (in Norwegian)	Number of representatives
Labour Party (Arbeiderpartiet)	5
Progress Party (Fremskrittspartiet)	2
Conservative Party (Høyre)	3
Centre Party (Senterpartiet)	4
Socialist Left Party (Sosialistisk Venstreparti)	3
Total number of members:	17

Åmot kommunestyre 1999–2003
Party name (in Norwegian)	Number of representatives
Labour Party (Arbeiderpartiet)	6
Progress Party (Fremskrittspartiet)	2
Conservative Party (Høyre)	5
Centre Party (Senterpartiet)	6
Socialist Left Party (Sosialistisk Venstreparti)	4
Total number of members:	23

Åmot kommunestyre 1995–1999
Party name (in Norwegian)	Number of representatives
Labour Party (Arbeiderpartiet)	8
Conservative Party (Høyre)	2
Centre Party (Senterpartiet)	10
Socialist Left Party (Sosialistisk Venstreparti)	3
Total number of members:	23

Åmot kommunestyre 1991–1995
Party name (in Norwegian)	Number of representatives
Labour Party (Arbeiderpartiet)	9
Conservative Party (Høyre)	2
Centre Party (Senterpartiet)	6
Socialist Left Party (Sosialistisk Venstreparti)	6
Total number of members:	23

Åmot kommunestyre 1987–1991
Party name (in Norwegian)	Number of representatives
Labour Party (Arbeiderpartiet)	11
Conservative Party (Høyre)	2
Centre Party (Senterpartiet)	4
Joint list of the Socialist Left Party (Sosialistisk Venstreparti) and the Communist Party (Kommunistiske Parti)	6
Total number of members:	23

Åmot kommunestyre 1983–1987
Party name (in Norwegian)	Number of representatives
Labour Party (Arbeiderpartiet)	11
Conservative Party (Høyre)	2
Communist Party (Kommunistiske Parti)	1
Centre Party (Senterpartiet)	4
Socialist Left Party (Sosialistisk Venstreparti)	5
Total number of members:	23

Åmot kommunestyre 1979–1983
Party name (in Norwegian)	Number of representatives
Labour Party (Arbeiderpartiet)	11
Conservative Party (Høyre)	3
Communist Party (Kommunistiske Parti)	1
Centre Party (Senterpartiet)	3
Socialist Left Party (Sosialistisk Venstreparti)	5
Total number of members:	23

Åmot kommunestyre 1975–1979
Party name (in Norwegian)	Number of representatives
Labour Party (Arbeiderpartiet)	11
Conservative Party (Høyre)	2
Centre Party (Senterpartiet)	4
Socialist Left Party (Sosialistisk Venstreparti)	6
Total number of members:	23

Åmot kommunestyre 1971–1975
Party name (in Norwegian)	Number of representatives
Labour Party (Arbeiderpartiet)	12
Conservative Party (Høyre)	1
Centre Party (Senterpartiet)	4
Socialist common list (Venstresosialistiske felleslister)	6
Total number of members:	23

Åmot kommunestyre 1967–1971
Party name (in Norwegian)	Number of representatives
Labour Party (Arbeiderpartiet)	12
Conservative Party (Høyre)	1
Communist Party (Kommunistiske Parti)	5
Centre Party (Senterpartiet)	3
Socialist People's Party (Sosialistisk Folkeparti)	1
Liberal Party (Venstre)	1
Total number of members:	23

Åmot kommunestyre 1963–1967
Party name (in Norwegian)	Number of representatives
Labour Party (Arbeiderpartiet)	12
Conservative Party (Høyre)	2
Communist Party (Kommunistiske Parti)	6
Centre Party (Senterpartiet)	3
Total number of members:	23

Åmot herredsstyre 1959–1963
Party name (in Norwegian)	Number of representatives
Labour Party (Arbeiderpartiet)	10
Conservative Party (Høyre)	1
Communist Party (Kommunistiske Parti)	8
Centre Party (Senterpartiet)	4
Total number of members:	23

Åmot herredsstyre 1955–1959
Party name (in Norwegian)	Number of representatives
Labour Party (Arbeiderpartiet)	9
Conservative Party (Høyre)	2
Communist Party (Kommunistiske Parti)	9
Farmers' Party (Bondepartiet)	3
Total number of members:	23

Åmot herredsstyre 1951–1955
Party name (in Norwegian)	Number of representatives
Labour Party (Arbeiderpartiet)	9
Communist Party (Kommunistiske Parti)	8
Farmers' Party (Bondepartiet)	3
Total number of members:	20

Åmot herredsstyre 1947–1951
Party name (in Norwegian)	Number of representatives
Labour Party (Arbeiderpartiet)	8
Communist Party (Kommunistiske Parti)	7
Joint List(s) of Non-Socialist Parties (Borgerlige Felleslister)	5
Total number of members:	20

Åmot herredsstyre 1945–1947
Party name (in Norwegian)	Number of representatives
Labour Party (Arbeiderpartiet)	7
Communist Party (Kommunistiske Parti)	9
Joint List(s) of Non-Socialist Parties (Borgerlige Felleslister)	4
Total number of members:	20

Åmot herredsstyre 1937–1941*
Party name (in Norwegian)	Number of representatives
Labour Party (Arbeiderpartiet)	8
Communist Party (Kommunistiske Parti)	7
Joint List(s) of Non-Socialist Parties (Borgerlige Felleslister)	5
Total number of members:	20
Note: Due to the German occupation of Norway during World War II, no elections were held for new municipal councils until after the war ended in 1945.

=== Mayor ===
The mayor (Norwegian: ordfører) of Åmot Municipality is the political leader of the municipality and the chairperson of the municipal council. Here is a list of people who have held this position:

- 1838–1839: Ole Bryhnie
- 1840–1844: Andreas Wulfsberg Dircks
- 1845–1845: Ole Bryhnie
- 1846–1847: Peder Alme
- 1848–1849: Jens Hals
- 1850–1851: Johannes Øgle
- 1852–1855: Adolf Iversen Glomstad
- 1856–1857: Ivar Almus
- 1858–1863: Andreas Knudsen
- 1864–1867: Adolf Iversen Glomstad
- 1868–1873: Hans Heggen
- 1874–1877: Haaken Knudsen Skramstad
- 1878–1881: Haaken Øgle
- 1882–1884: Haaken Knudsen Skramstad (V)
- 1885–1889: Haaken Øgle (V)
- 1890–1893: Tollef Kilde (V)
- 1894–1896: Ole S. Aaset (MV)
- 1897–1898: Olav Nergaard (V)
- 1899–1901: Ole S. Aaset (MV)
- 1901–1904: Olav Nergaard (V)
- 1905–1910: Tollef Kilde (V)
- 1911–1919: Haakon Bolstad (ArbDem)
- 1920–1923: Johan Næss (ArbDem)
- 1923–1925: Eivind Petershagen (NKP)
- 1926–1940: Ole Hermansen (NKP)
- 1941–1943: Peder Edvard Vorum (NS)
- 1943–1945: Karsten Rosenberg (NS)
- 1945–1947: Eivind Petershagen (NKP)
- 1947–1959: Ludvig Johansen (Ap)
- 1959–1975: Bjørn Bakke (Ap)
- 1975–1987: Kåre Halvorsen (SV)
- 1987–1991: Per L. Gundersen (Ap)
- 1991–1993: Vivi Nysveen Østerås (SV)
- 1994–1999: Åse Grønlien Østmoe (Sp)
- 1999–2003: Per L. Gundersen (Ap)
- 2003–2011: Ole Gustav Narud (Sp)
- 2011–2015: Espen André Kristiansen (Ap)
- 2015–2019: Ole Gustav Narud (Sp)
- 2019–present: Ole Erik Hørstad (H)

== Geography ==
Åmot is located in the east-central part of Innlandet county. It is bordered to the north by Rendalen Municipality, to the east by Trysil Municipality, to the south by Elverum Municipality, to the southwest by Hamar Municipality and Ringsaker Municipality, and in the west by Stor-Elvdal Municipality.

The Renaelva and Julussa rivers are both tributaries of the large river Glomma, all three of which flow through Åmot. The Kjøllsæter Bridge crosses the river Renaelva, just north of its confluence with the Julussa river. The Julussdalen valley follows the river Julussa through the municipality. The highest point in the municipality is the 1,057.31-metre (3,468.9 ft) tall mountain Hemmelkampen, a tripoint on the border of Åmot Municipality, Stor-Elvdal Municipality, and Ringsaker Municipality.

== Population ==
Number of minorities (1st and 2nd generation) in Åmot Municipality by country of origin in 2017
Ancestry	Number
Lithuania	60
Poland	29
Germany	28
Eritrea	24
Sweden	23

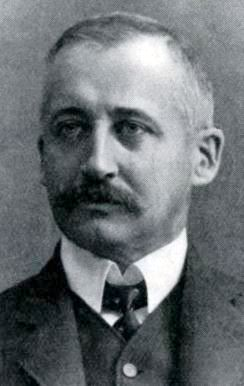
Vilhelm Uchermann

== Notable people ==
- Vilhelm Uchermann (1852 in Åmot – 1929), a physician who was Norway's first otorhinolaryngologist
- Tollef Kilde (1853 in Åmot – 1947), a forest owner, politician, and local Mayor ca.1900
- Hans Storhaug, MM, DSM (1915 in Rena – 1995), a Norwegian resistance member during WWII
- Vidar Sandbeck (1918 in Åmot – 2005), a Norwegian folk singer, composer, and writer
- Anne-Cath. Vestly (1920 in Rena – 2008), an author of children's literature
- Ivar Nergaard (born 1964 in Rena), an actor and writer
- Stian Berget (born 1977 in Rena), a retired footballer with almost 200 club caps
- Tuva Novotny (born 1979), a Swedish actress, director and singer; brought up in Åmot
