= Julussdalen =

Valley in Innlandet, Norway

Geology
- Type: River valley

Geography
- Location: Innlandet, Norway
- Coordinates: 61.098009°N 11.5649557°E

Location
- Interactive map of the valley

Julussdalen is a small valley in Innlandet county, Norway. The valley runs through Elverum Municipality and Åmot Municipality as it follows the river Julussa, about 15 kilometres (9.3 mi) east of the village of Rena. There are scattered settlements in the valley, especially in the lower part in Elverum. Julussdalen has many historic farms with cabins, mills, and mountain pastures.

== Location ==
=== Geography ===
The river Julussa flows through the valley, starting from Bergesjøen which is at an elevation of 318 metres (1,043 ft) above sea level, and ending as the Julussa flows into the large river Glomma. Julussdalen was very important for timber out of the big forests, dating from around the mid-16th century.

=== Etymology ===
Julussdalen is named after the river Julussa. The first part of the name "Juluss" is most likely derived from a Norwegian dialect word that means "silent", and the last part "dalen" is the Norwegian word for "valley". Julussdalen means most likely "the quiet valley" or "the valley of silence".
