= Ole Hermansen =

Norwegian trade unionist (1893–1942)

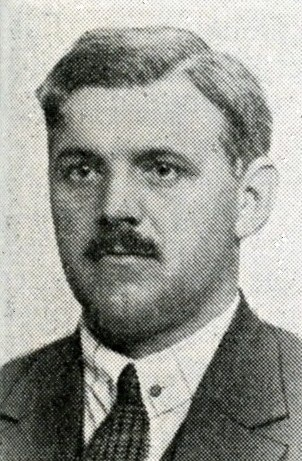

Ole Hermansen (1893–1942) was a Norwegian trade unionist.

He began as a forest and construction worker, but was hired by Rena Kartonfabrikk (Rena Carton Factory) in 1920. He was a member of the Labour Party from 1915, but joined the Communist Party in 1923, and was elected to the municipal council for Åmot Municipality in the same year. In 1926 he became mayor of Åmot. He was a delegate at the Sixth Comintern Congress in 1928, and in 1929 he was elected to the Communist Party central board. In the 1933 election he was the Communist Party's first candidate in Hedmark.

During the occupation of Norway by Nazi Germany he was arrested by the Nazis, shortly after Operation Barbarossa. He died in Sachsenhausen concentration camp.
