= Julussa =

River in Innlandet, Norway

Julussa Julusa
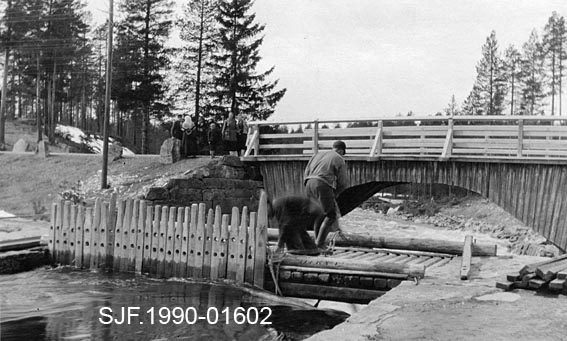
- Draining of Ringlidammen at the top of the Julussa

Location
- Country: Norway
- County: Innlandet
- Municipalities: Åmot Municipality and Elverum Municipality

Physical characteristics
- Source: Bergesjøen
  - location: Elverum Municipality, Norway
  - coordinates: 60.98752923°N 11.7757129°E
  - elevation: 318 metres (1,043 ft)
- Mouth: Renaelva
  - location: Åmot Municipality, Norway
  - coordinates: 61.16294679°N 11.4453077°E
  - elevation: 216 metres (709 ft)
- Length: 32 km (20 mi)

Julussa is a river in Innlandet county, Norway. The river flows through the Julussdalen valley in Elverum Municipality and Åmot Municipality. The river begins at the lake Bergesjøen which sits at an elevation of 318 metres (1,043 ft) above sea level. From Bergesjøen, Julussa flows to the northwest for 32 kilometres (20 mi) until it flows into the river Renaelva.

== History ==
The name Julussa comes from the old Norwegian word "ljudlausa" which means soundless. The reason for that given name is that the river flows so silently through the valley of Julussdalen.

Julussa was very important for timber rafting the timber out of the big forests, from around the mid 16th century until 1969. The place Brattveltdammen along the Julussa is known as a national historic place for the Julussa Conflict in 1927.

== See also ==
- List of rivers in Norway
