= Nordre Osen Church =

Church in Innlandet, Norway

- Nordre Osen kirke
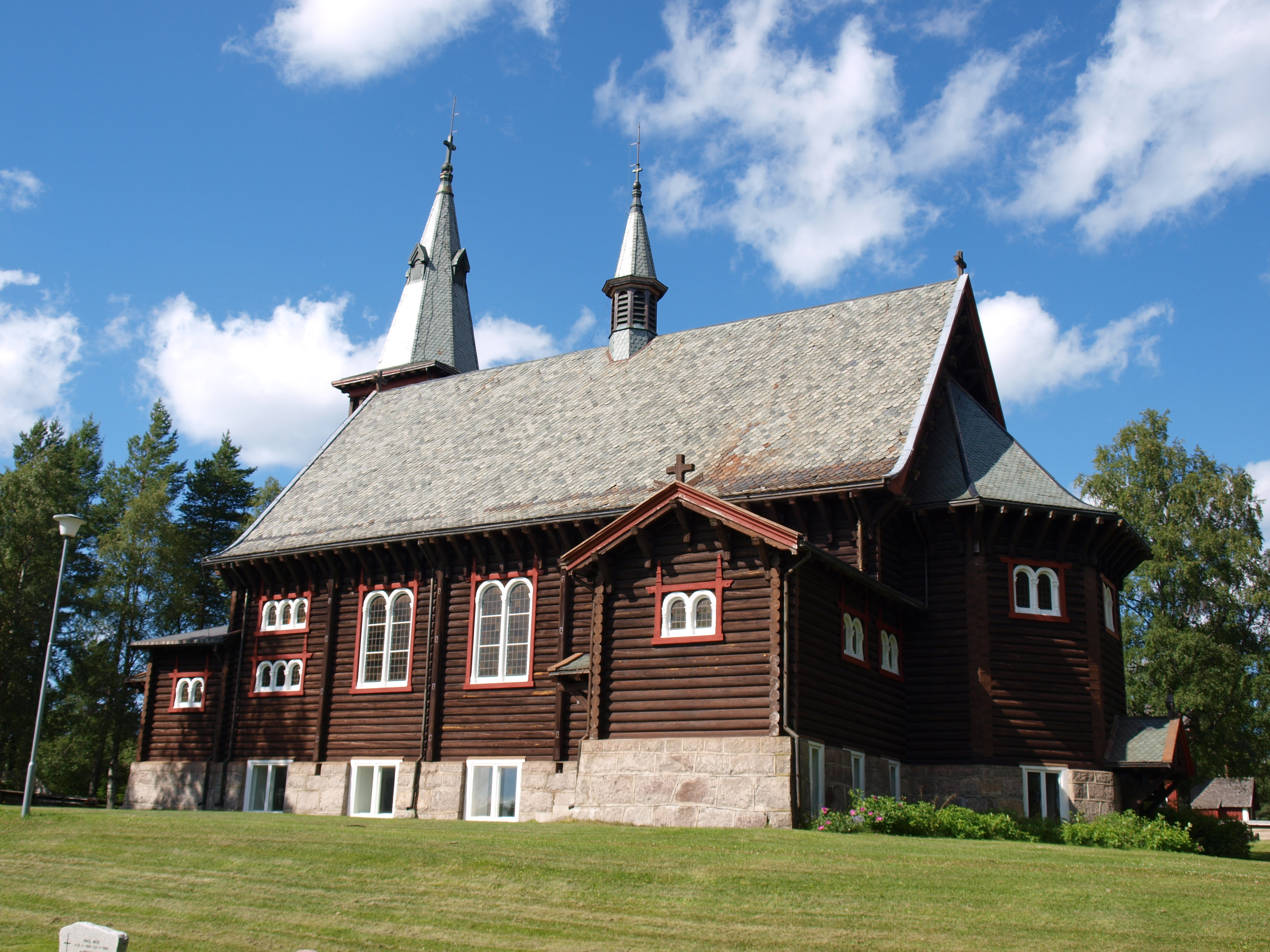
- View of the church
- Nordre Osen Church
- 61°18′01″N 11°45′46″E
- Location: Åmot Municipality, Innlandet
- Country: Norway
- Denomination: Church of Norway
- Churchmanship: Evangelical Lutheran

History
- Status: Parish church
- Founded: 1923
- Consecrated: 1923

Architecture
- Functional status: Active
- Architect: Ivar Viehe-Næss
- Architectural type: Long church
- Completed: 1923 (103 years ago)

Specifications
- Capacity: 316
- Materials: Wood

Administration
- Diocese: Hamar bispedømme
- Deanery: Sør-Østerdal prosti
- Parish: Nordre Osen
- Norwegian Cultural Heritage Site
- Type: Church
- Status: Protected
- ID: 85162

Nordre Osen Church (Norwegian: Nordre Osen kirke) is a parish church of the Church of Norway in Åmot Municipality in Innlandet county, Norway. It is located in the village of Osneset. It is the church for the Nordre Osen parish which is part of the Sør-Østerdal prosti (deanery) in the Diocese of Hamar. The brown, wooden church was built in a long church design in 1923 using plans drawn up by the architect Ivar Viehe-Næss. The church seats about 316 people.

== History ==
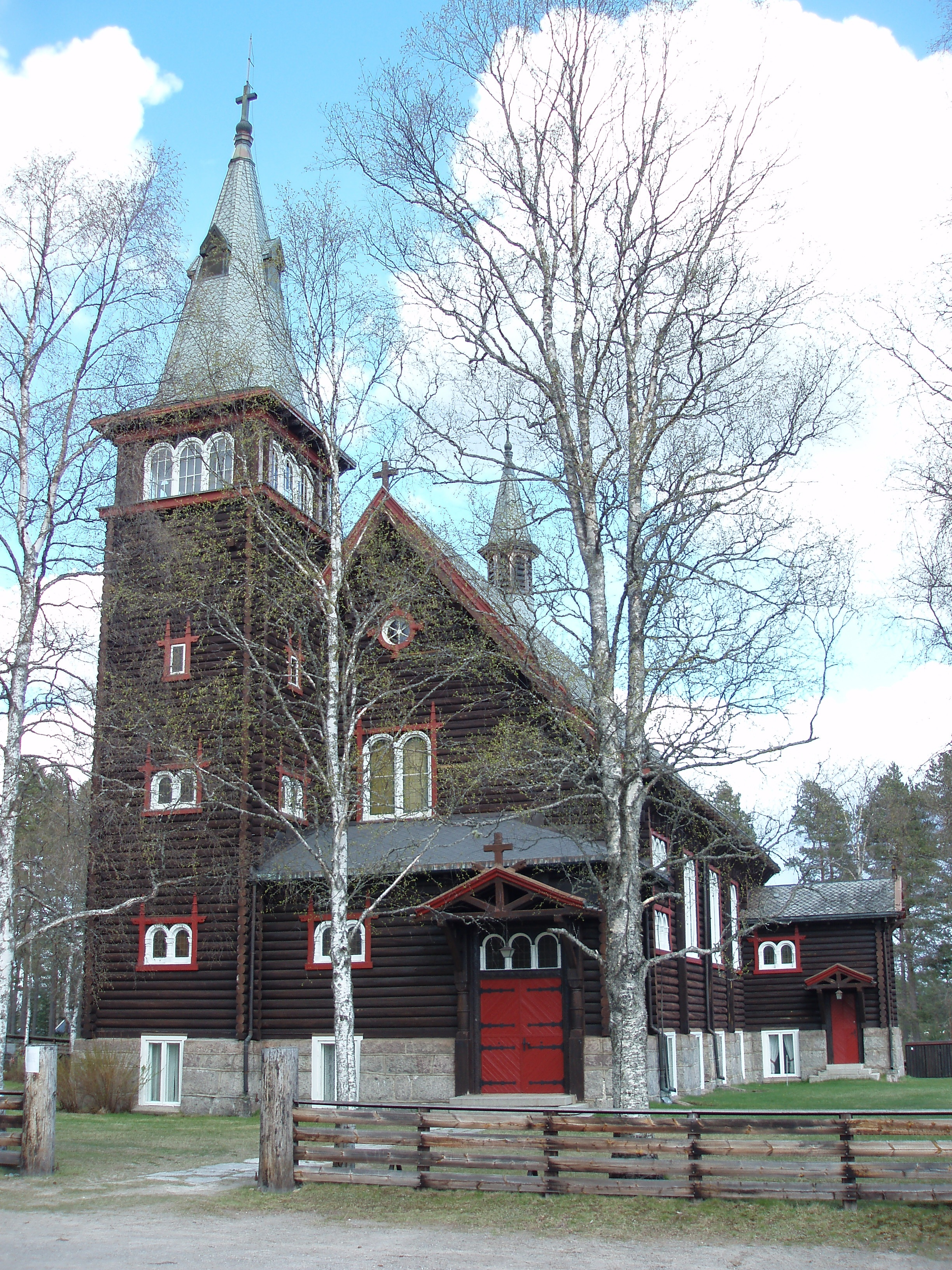
View of the church

The over 150-year-old Nordre Osen Church gradually became too small, and it was cold and drafty. There were various plans to expand and upgrade it, but it was eventually decided to build a new church about 75 metres (246 ft) south of the old church. The new building was designed by Ivar Viehe-Næss, who was born in Osneset, but was then living in Chicago. It is a long church with an asymmetrically placed tower with a church porch next to it on the west end of the building. To the east is a chancel with sacristies on each side. New at that time (and rarely seen in Norwegian churches prior to that time) was that the church had a finished basement. This was supposedly an American element since the architect had worked in the United States. The lower floor houses the assembly hall, kitchen, bathrooms, and storage areas. The new church was consecrated on 24 August 1923. After the new church was completed the Old Nordre Osen Church was taken out of regular use and essentially turned into a museum. The old church was renamed the "Old Nordre Osen Church" and the new building retained the historic name "Nordre Osen Church". The old church is still owned by the parish and it is occasionally used for special events such as weddings and other celebrations. There is one service held in the church each year on Olsok.

== See also ==
- List of churches in Hamar
