= Deset Church =

Church in Innlandet, Norway

- Deset kirke
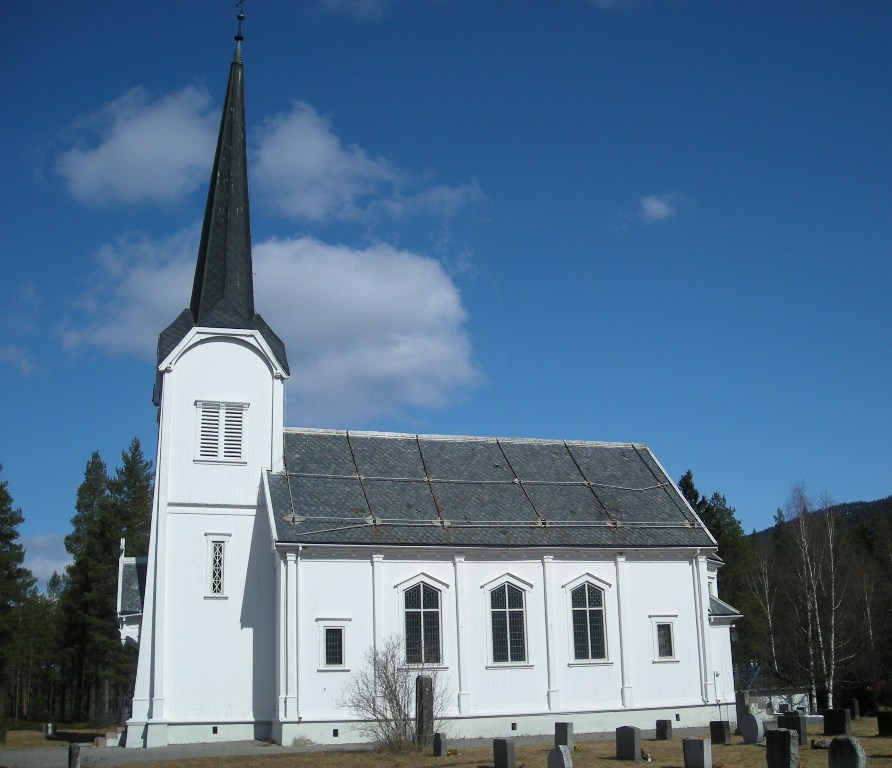
- View of the church
- Deset Church
- 61°18′13″N 11°27′37″E
- Location: Åmot Municipality, Innlandet
- Country: Norway
- Denomination: Church of Norway
- Churchmanship: Evangelical Lutheran

History
- Status: Parish church
- Founded: 1867
- Consecrated: 1867

Architecture
- Functional status: Active
- Architect: Johan Henrik Nebelong
- Architectural type: Long church
- Completed: 1867 (159 years ago)

Specifications
- Capacity: 140
- Materials: Wood

Administration
- Diocese: Hamar bispedømme
- Deanery: Sør-Østerdal prosti
- Parish: Deset
- Norwegian Cultural Heritage Site
- Type: Church
- Status: Protected
- ID: 84023

Deset Church (Norwegian: Deset kirke) is a parish church of the Church of Norway in Åmot Municipality in Innlandet county, Norway. It is located in the village of Deset. It is the church for the Deset parish which is part of the Sør-Østerdal prosti (deanery) in the Diocese of Hamar. The white, wooden church was built in a long church design in 1867 using plans drawn up by the architect Johan Henrik Nebelong. The church seats about 140 people.

== History ==
Planning for a new church in the village of Deset to serve the northwestern part of the municipality, along the Rena river valley began in the 1860s when permission to build the church was granted. The Danish-born architect Johan Henrik Nebelong was hired to design the church. The church is a long church with a rectangular nave and a chancel on the east end with sacristies on either side of it. There's also a church porch with a tower on the west end. The church was rebuilt and restored in 1903, under the direction of an architect named Braaten. This renovation included the redesigning and rebuilding of the church tower. (View of the church before the renovations.) New renovations took place in 1953. On that occasion, the chancel vault was restored and regained its blue sky with shining stars.

== See also ==
- List of churches in Hamar
