= Ingrid Schulerud =

Norwegian diplomat (born 1959)

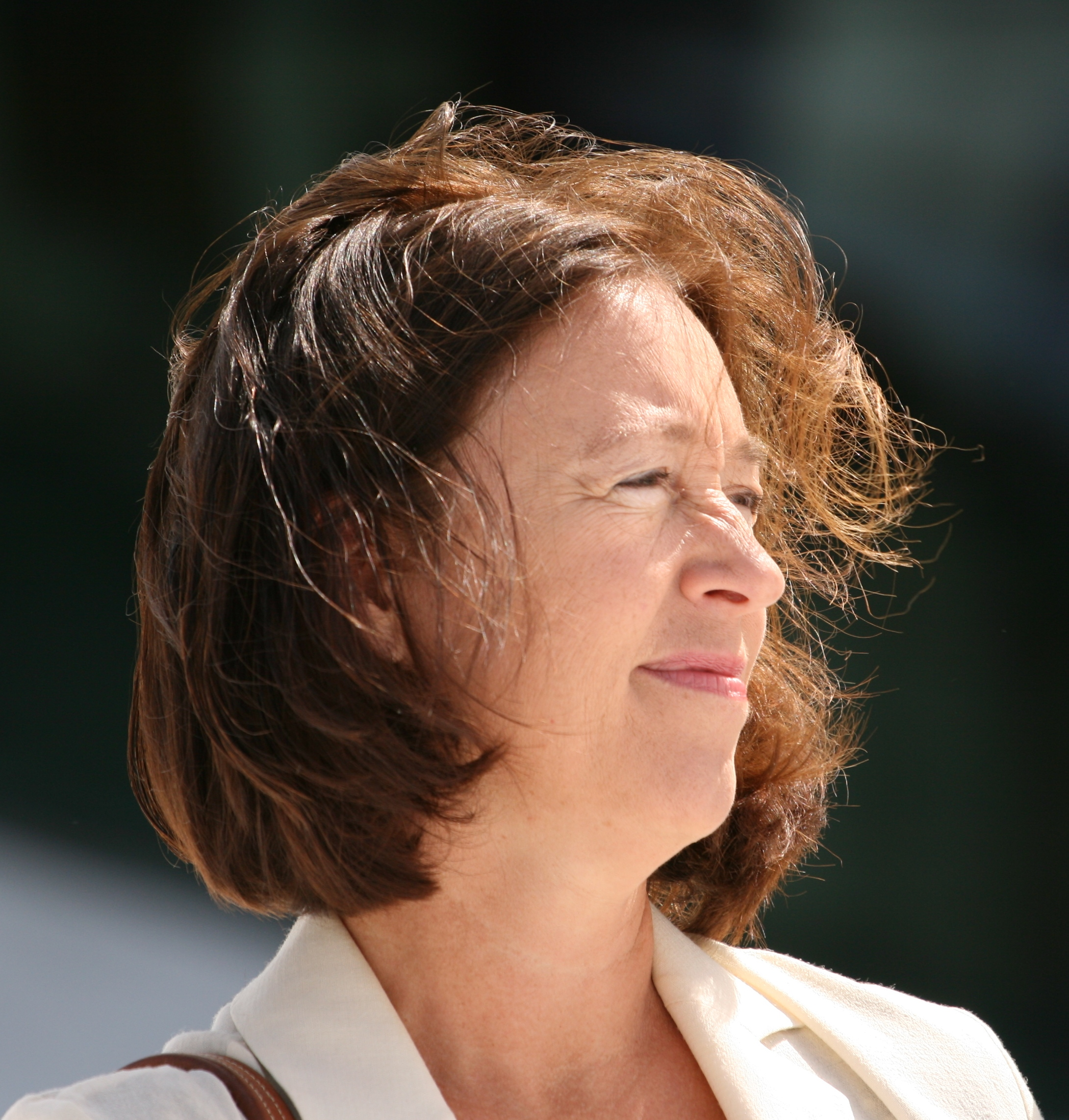
- Schulerud at the Oslo Opera House, 2009

Norwegian Ambassador to Belgium
- In office 17 April 2015 – 9 October 2019
- Prime Minister: Erna Solberg
- Preceded by: Niels Engelschiøn
- Succeeded by: Per Strand Sjaastad

Spouse of the Prime Minister of Norway
- In office 17 October 2005 – 16 October 2013
- Prime Minister: Jens Stoltenberg
- Preceded by: Bjørg Bondevik
- Succeeded by: Sindre Finnes
- In office 17 March 2000 – 19 October 2001
- Prime Minister: Jens Stoltenberg
- Preceded by: Bjørg Bondevik
- Succeeded by: Bjørg Bondevik

Personal details
- Born: 8 July 1959 (age 67) Oslo, Norway
- Party: Labour
- Spouse: Jens Stoltenberg (m. 1987)
- Children: 2

Ingrid Schulerud (born 8 July 1959) is a Norwegian diplomat.

She served as Norway's ambassador to Belgium from 2015 to 2019.

== Personal life ==
=== Early life ===
Schulerud is the daughter of Mentz Schulerud, an author and radio personality well known for his encyclopedic knowledge of their home city of Oslo. Her aunt—Mentz' sister—was the children's book author Anne-Cath. Vestly.

=== Education ===
Schulerud attended Oslo Cathedral School, where she met Jens when they were both 17 years old. Here, she defeated her future husband in the election for Representative to the National Students’ Union, running for the Socialist Left Party.

=== Family life ===
Schulerud is married to Jens Stoltenberg, the former Secretary General of NATO, and the former Norwegian Prime Minister. Being the spouse of the Norwegian Prime Minister during two different periods of time, (2000–2001 and 2005–2013), she has chosen a somewhat withdrawn social position. During the first period she did not accompany her husband on any official state visits for over a year, until they visited India together in April 2001. In general though, she has chosen to stay out of the media's scrutiny primarily to shield her children. The couple have a son and a daughter.

== Career ==
After travels in Latin America, Schulerud wanted to work for developmental organisations; however, she was engaged by the Ministry of International Development to study the environmental impact of World Bank projects. This led her to break off her ongoing master's degree, and undergo the basic training for the Ministry of Foreign Affairs, that she finished in 1988.

In 1990, while she was stationed at the Norwegian embassy in Budapest, Hungary, her husband was appointed State Secretary in the Ministry of the Environment, and this caused her return home to Norway. Subsequently, she has held different positions in the Ministry, mostly with matters relating to the Baltic countries and Central Europe.

She was the Deputy Director General for Central Europe and EEA-financing in the Ministry of Foreign Affairs in Norway until becoming the Norwegian Ambassador to Belgium in April 2015.

She has been active in the Norwegian Civil Service Union, and has attended the Norwegian National Defence College; an institution for education on military and strategic matters for both military personnel and civilians.
