= Åmot Church =

Church in Innlandet, Norway

- Åmot kirke
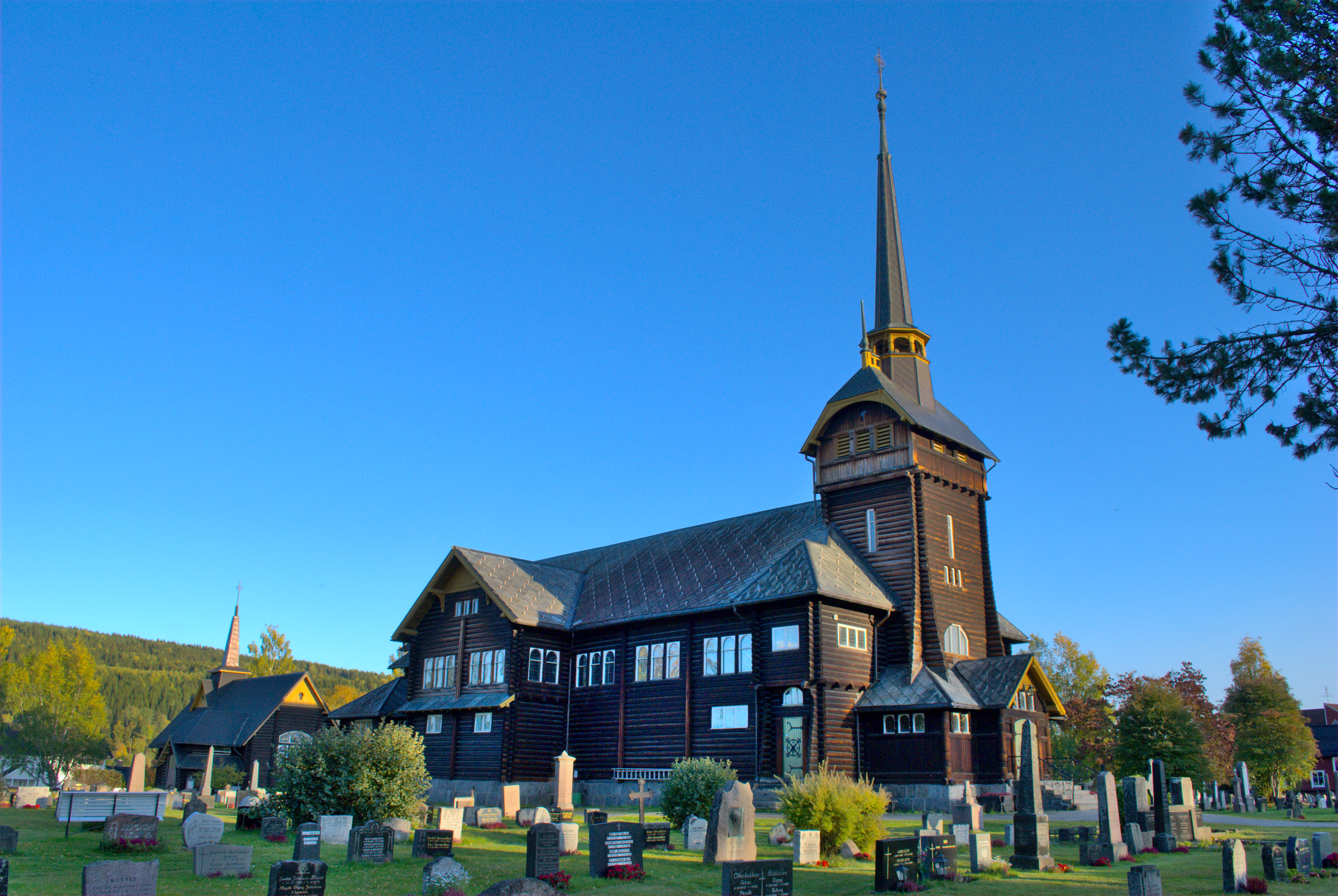
- View of the church
- Åmot Church
- 61°08′02″N 11°22′23″E
- Location: Åmot Municipality, Innlandet
- Country: Norway
- Denomination: Church of Norway
- Previous denomination: Catholic Church
- Churchmanship: Evangelical Lutheran

History
- Status: Parish church
- Founded: 1902
- Consecrated: 1902

Architecture
- Functional status: Active
- Architect: Henrik Bull
- Architectural type: Cruciform
- Style: Dragestil
- Completed: 1902 (124 years ago)

Specifications
- Capacity: 600
- Materials: Wood

Administration
- Diocese: Hamar bispedømme
- Deanery: Sør-Østerdal prosti
- Parish: Åmot
- Norwegian Cultural Heritage Site
- Type: Church
- Status: Protected
- ID: 85969

Åmot Church (Norwegian: Åmot kirke) is a parish church of the Church of Norway in Åmot Municipality in Innlandet county, Norway. It is located in the village of Rena. It is the church for the Åmot parish which is part of the Sør-Østerdal prosti (deanery) in the Diocese of Hamar. The brown, wooden church was built in a cruciform design in 1902 using plans drawn up by the architect Henrik Bull. The church seats about 600 people.

== History ==
The earliest existing historical records of the church date back to the year 1400, but the church was not new that year. The first church in Åmot was a wooden stave church that was likely built during the 13th century. This church was located on a site about 675 metres (2,215 ft) to the north of the present church site. In 1529, the old church was heavily remodeled. In 1628, the old church was torn down and a new timber-framed cruciform building on the same site. In 1786, a new church was built on a site about 675 metres (2,215 ft) to the south of the old church site, closer to the centre of the village. After the new church was completed, the old church was torn down.

In 1814, this church served as an election church (Norwegian: valgkirke). Together with more than 300 other parish churches across Norway, it was a polling station for elections to the 1814 Norwegian Constituent Assembly which wrote the Constitution of Norway. This was Norway's first national elections. Each church parish was a constituency that elected people called "electors" who later met together in each county to elect the representatives for the assembly that was to meet at Eidsvoll Manor later that year.

In 1899, the old church was torn down. A new cruciform, dragestil church was built to replace it on the same site. Henrik Bull was hired to design the new church and Martin O. Bråten from Åsnes was hired as the lead builder. The new church was completed and consecrated in 1902.

== Media gallery ==
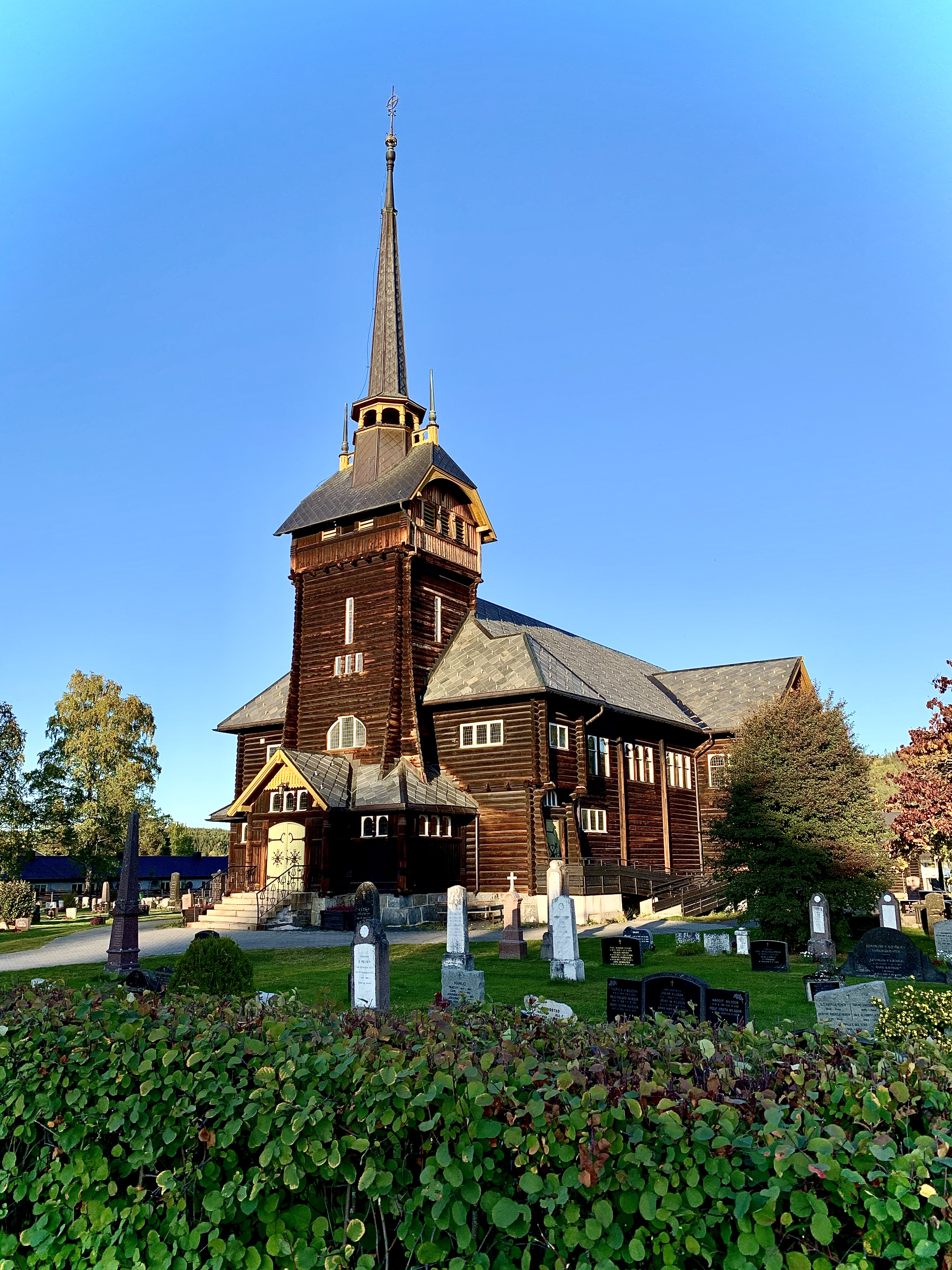

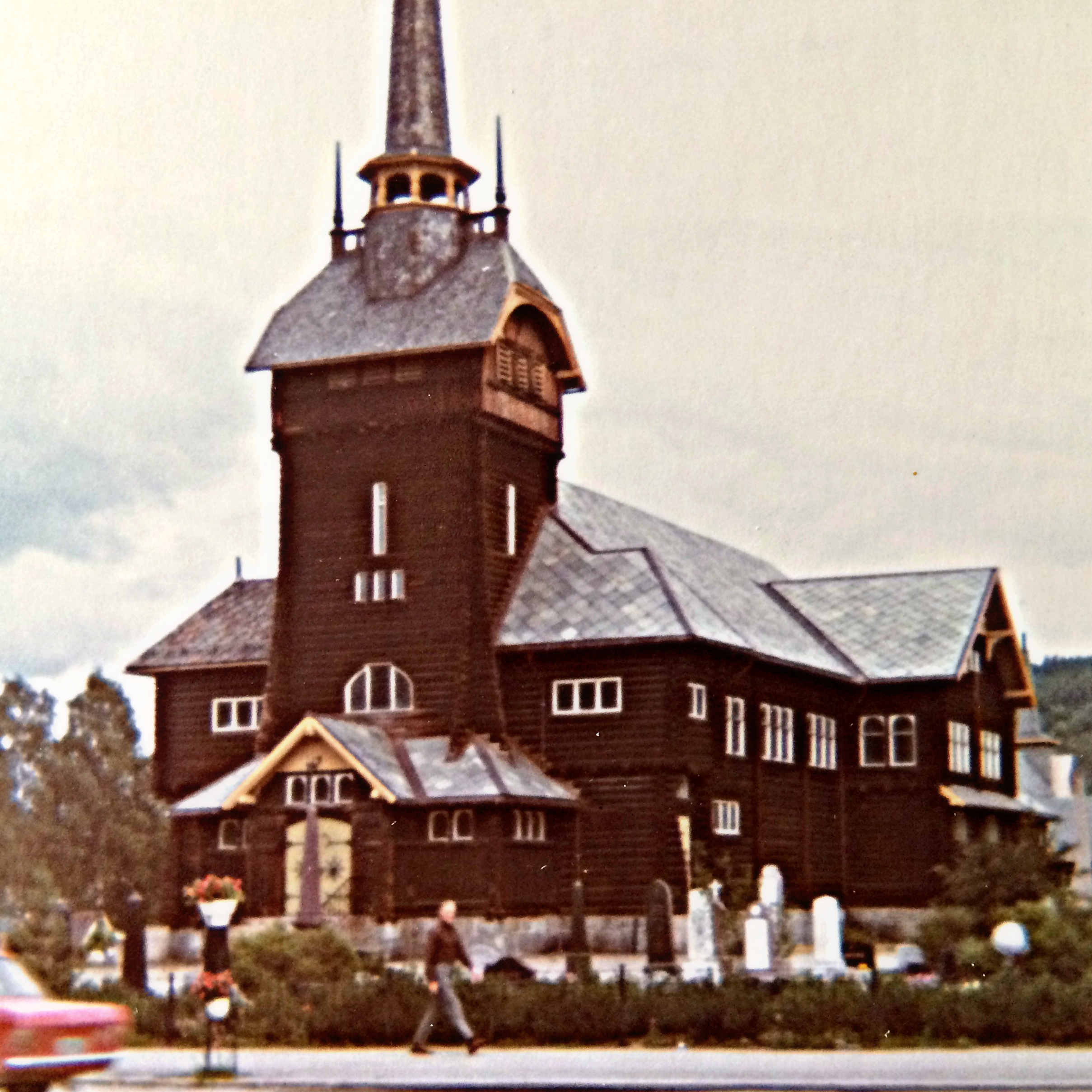

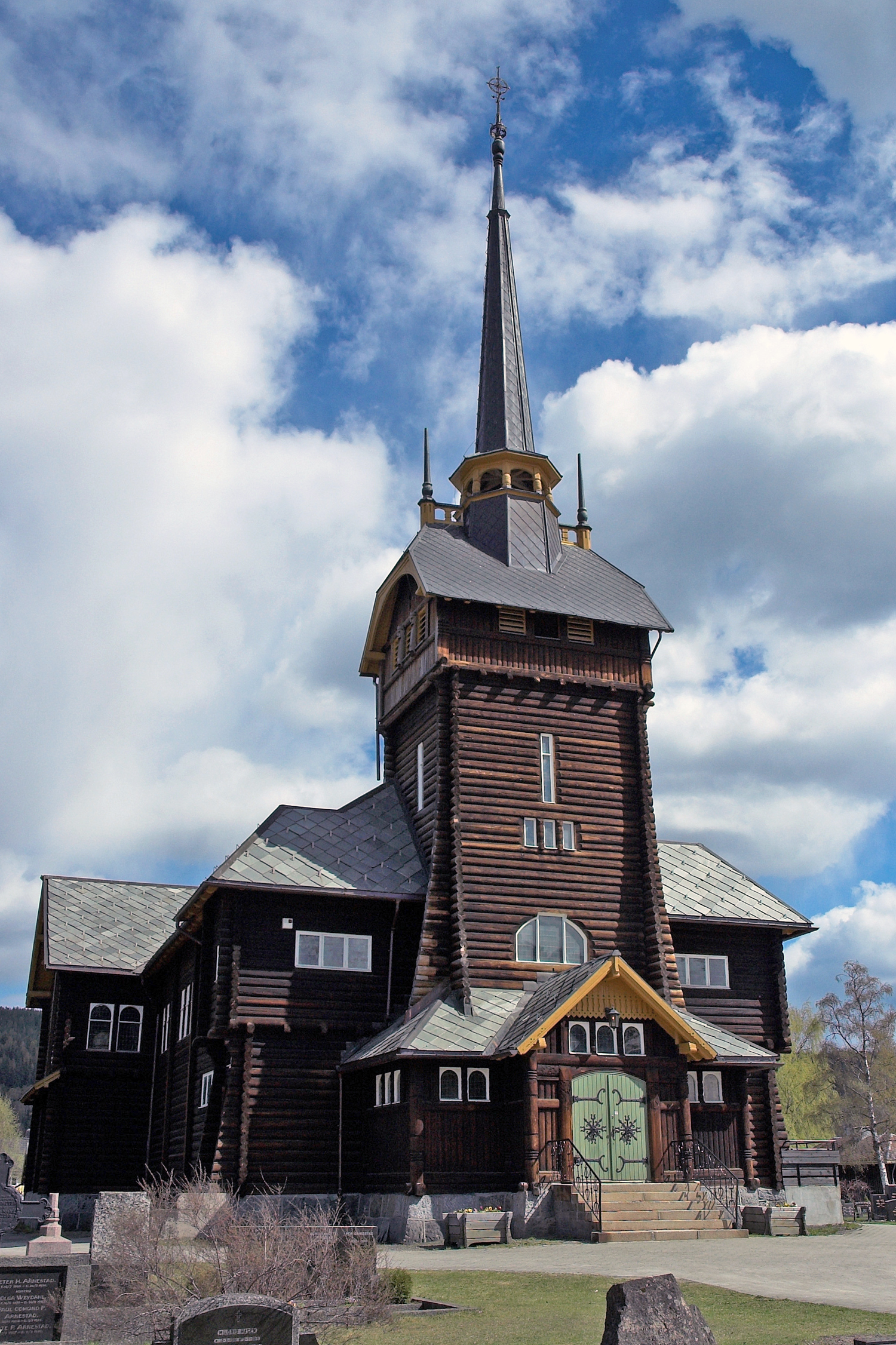

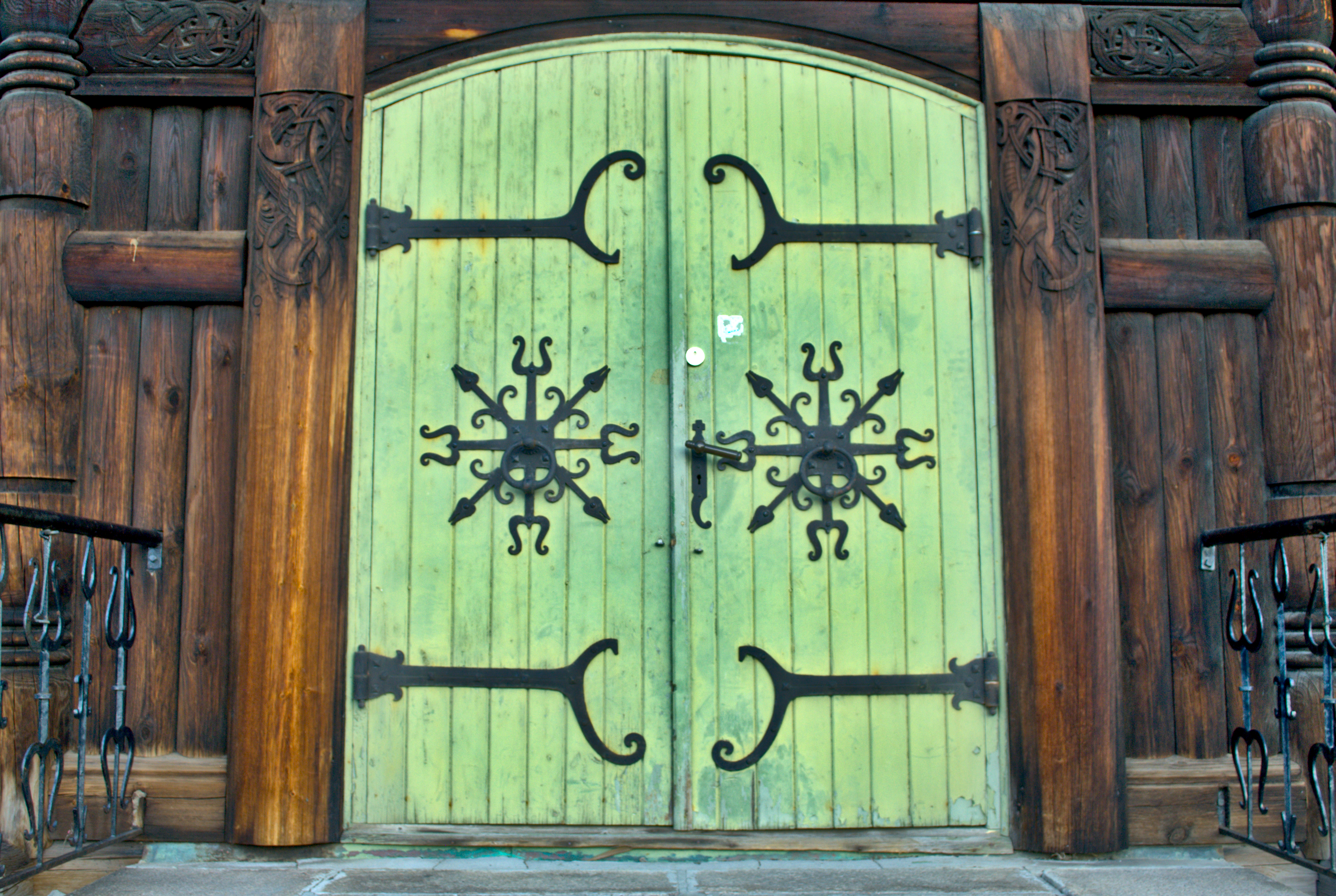

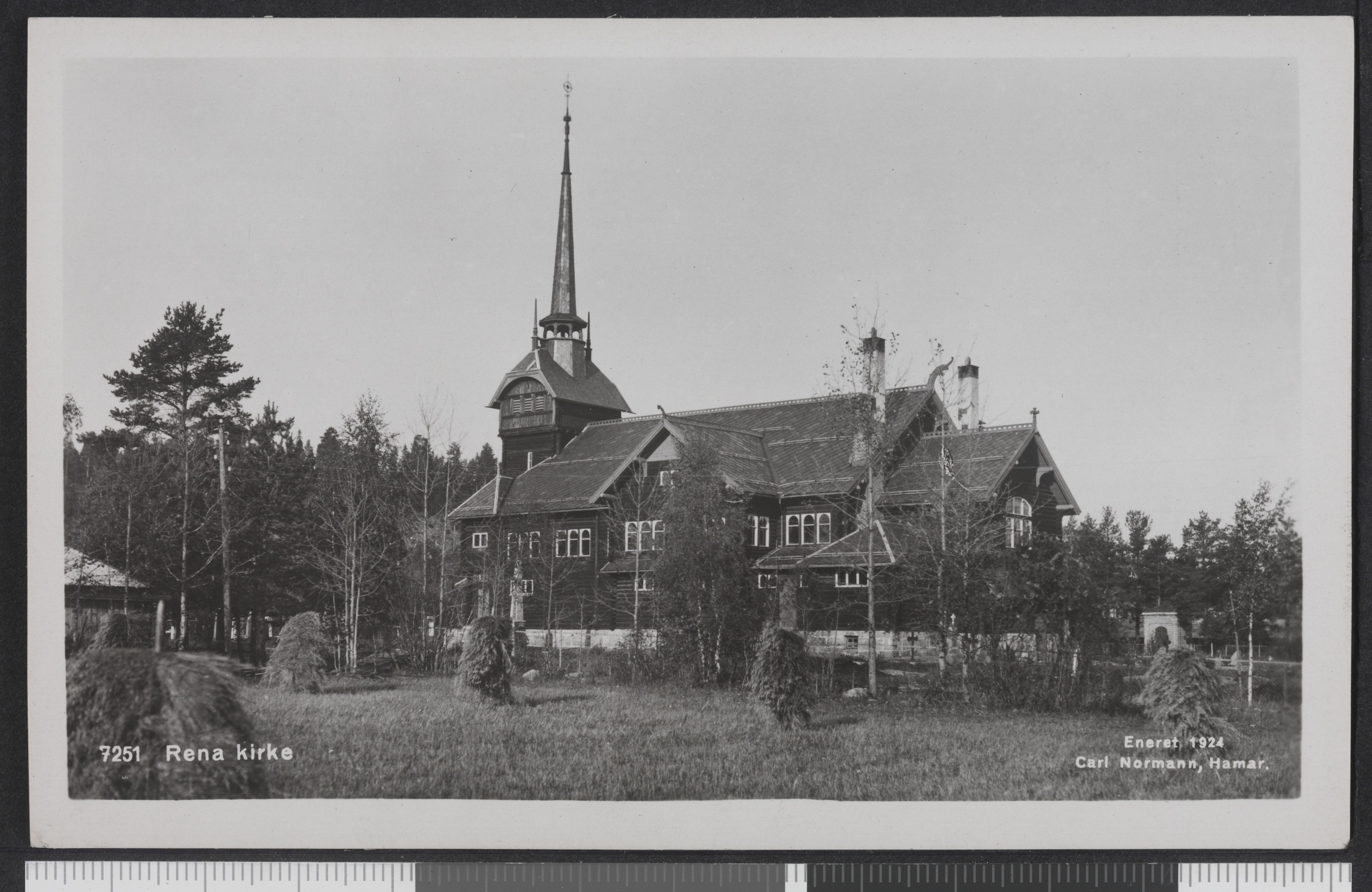

== See also ==
- List of churches in Hamar
