= Old Nordre Osen Church =

Church in Innlandet, Norway

- Nordre Osen gamle kirke
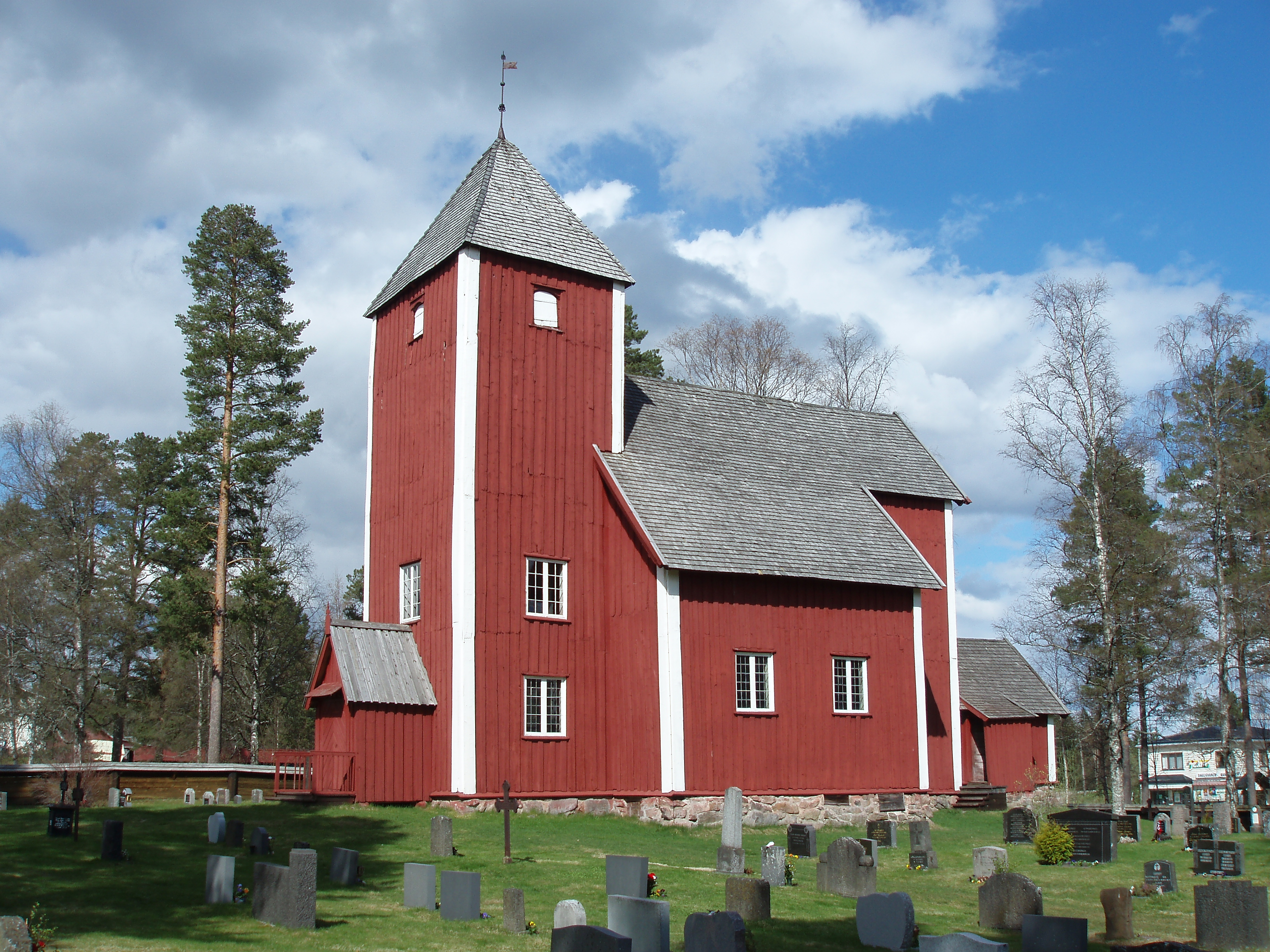
- View of the church
- Old Nordre Osen Church
- 61°18′03″N 11°45′47″E
- Location: Åmot Municipality, Innlandet
- Country: Norway
- Denomination: Church of Norway
- Churchmanship: Evangelical Lutheran

History
- Status: Parish church
- Founded: 1777
- Consecrated: 12 October 1777

Architecture
- Functional status: Active
- Architect: Peder Ellingsen Rødstuen
- Architectural type: Cruciform
- Completed: 1777 (249 years ago)

Specifications
- Capacity: 150
- Materials: Wood

Administration
- Diocese: Hamar bispedømme
- Deanery: Sør-Østerdal prosti
- Parish: Nordre Osen
- Norwegian Cultural Heritage Site
- Type: Church
- Status: Automatically protected
- ID: 85162

Old Nordre Osen Church (Norwegian: Nordre Osen gamle kirke) is a parish church of the Church of Norway in Åmot Municipality in Innlandet county, Norway. It is located in the village of Osneset. It is the church for the Nordre Osen parish which is part of the Sør-Østerdal prosti (deanery) in the Diocese of Hamar. The red, wooden church was built in a cruciform design in 1777 using plans drawn up by the architect Peder Ellingsen Rødstuen. The church seats about 150 people.

== History ==
During a period of new settlement in this part of Hedmark during the late 1700s, a need for a new church in Osneset was clearly seen. A new wooden, cruciform church was built in 1777. The church has a distinctive cruciform design with unusual proportions. It has a very high ceiling in relation to its width and the transept arms are short and wide. The western cross arm is the same as the base of the tower. The eastern cross arm is the choir which has a small sacristy extension to the east. The new church was consecrated on 12 October 1777.

By the early 20th century, it was clear that the old church was too small for the parish. There were plans to enlarge and upgrade the building, but eventually plans were made to replace the old building. Strong opposition to this took hold in the community. People insisted that the old church be saved, so a new church was built about 75 metres (246 ft) south of the old church. When the new Nordre Osen Church opened, the old church was taken out of regular use and essentially turned into a museum. It was renamed the "Old Nordre Osen Church" and the new building retained the historic name "Nordre Osen Church". The old church is still owned by the parish and it is occasionally used for special events such as weddings and other celebrations. There is one service held in the church each year on Olsok. The church still does not have any electricity in the building. A short distance north of the church is a war memorial in memory of the battles against Sweden during the Napoleonic Wars.

== See also ==
- List of churches in Hamar
