= Mørstad hoard =

Coin hoard in Norway

The Mørstad Hoard is a hoard of Viking-era coins discovered in April 2026 near Rena, Norway.

A collection of coins from the hoard is set to be displayed at the Oslo Historical Museum in a temporary exhibit that will open on 20 November 2026.

== Discovery ==
Two metal detectorists discovered 19 silver coins in a farm near Rena, in the Østerdalen region, on 10 April 2026. As of October 2026, the hoard remains under archaeological investigation.

== Contents ==
As of October 2026, approximately 5,500 coins have been discovered in the hoard. The hoard itself (i.e., when the coins were deposited) dates to approximately 1047. Most of the coins were made the areas now called England and Germany, not in Norway itself (during the Viking Age). Some did originate in Norway or Denmark. The coins were likely minted during the respective reigns of Cnut and Æthelred the Unready, of England; Otto III, Holy Roman Emperor; and Harald Hardrada of Norway. The hoard also contained fragments of silver fibulae (hacksilver).

In October 2026, a coin minted during the reign of King Olaf Haraldsson was found in the hoard. The coin features a portrait of Olaf Haraldsson alongside the inscription "ONLAF R+ NORMANORV" ("Olaf, King of the Norwegians"). The coin was likely minted between 1024 and 1028. Coins minted during his reign are particularly rare; less than 20 are known to have survived. Prior to this discovery, only four coins with the same design had been discovered, with the last being found in 1924.
