= Johan Vestly =

Norwegian artist (1923–1993)

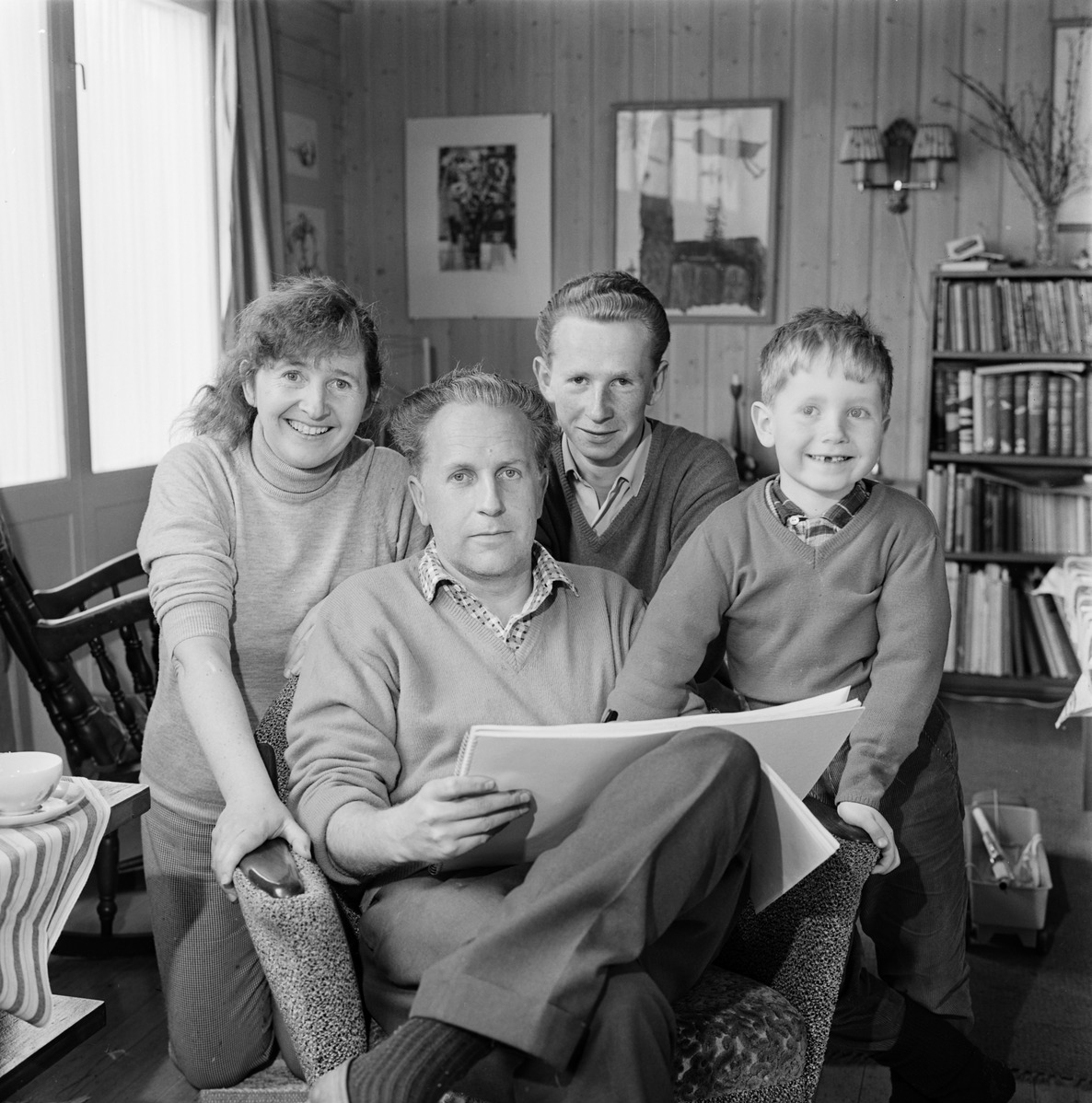
- Johan Vestly with wife and sons in 1964
- Born: November 24, 1923; Oslo, Norway
- Died: November 28, 1993 (aged 70)
- Occupations: Illustrator, artist and film producer
- Spouse: Anne-Cath. Vestly
- Children: 2 sons

Johan Vestly (November 24, 1923 – November 28, 1993) was a Norwegian illustrator, artist and film producer.

Johan Vestly was born in Oslo, Norway. After taking his secondary education in 1943, he studied at the Norwegian National Academy of Craft and Art Industry as well as privately. He also stayed in Paris in 1949. Originally a painter, Vestly was represented at the Norwegian Autumn Exhibition in 1947.

Johan Vestly illustrated his first book in 1953, and later illustrated most of the books of his wife, Anne-Cath. Vestly. Together with his wife, Johan Vestly twice received the Illustrasjonsprisen awarded by the Norwegian National Library Authority (Statens bibliotektilsyn). In 1964, the husband and wife team was honored for Knerten gifter seg and in 1976 for Guro og nøkkerosene.

Vestly also worked as a television producer on several programs including the television series Guro and directed a documentary on Norwegian skier pioneer, Sondre Nordheim. Norway's stamps for the 2010 Europa issue under the joint theme of children's books featured illustrates by Johan Vestly. The stamps featured Mormor og de åtte ungene (Grandma and the Eight Children) from the seven books series written by Anne-Cath. Vestly.
