= Mentz Schulerud =

- Born: 19 October 1915; Kristiania, Norway
- Died: 18 May 2003 (aged 87)
- Occupations: Author, radio personality and theatre director

Mentz Schulerud (19 October 1915 – 18 May 2003) was a Norwegian author, radio personality and theatre director. He was known for his encyclopaedic knowledge of the city of Oslo.

Schulerud was born in Kristiania, but grew up in Rena, Lillehammer, and Ringsaker as the older brother of the famous children's book author Anne-Cath. Vestly. Schulerud took his cand.mag. degree in 1941. During the German occupation of Norway he was involved in a Norwegian resistance group called 830-S. For his work in the Norwegian illegal press, he was incarcerated at Grini concentration camp in 1944.

After the war, was hired as programme secretary in the Norwegian Broadcasting Corporation, in 1946. He was later subeditor from 1959 to 1962. During this period he also worked as editor-in-chief of the literary magazine Vinduet from 1959 to 1963. In 1962 he left the Norwegian Broadcasting Corporation to become director of Oslo Nye Teater. Through his numerous radio programmes, articles and books, he vividly conveyed the history of the capital with anecdotes and biographical sketches, particularly relating to its artistic life. A Riksmål proponent, Schulerud chaired the organization Riksmålsvernet for a period, and was later a member of the Norwegian Academy for Language and Literature.

Schulerud was decorated as Knight, First Class of the Royal Norwegian Order of St. Olav.

Mentz Schulerud was the father of Ingrid Schulerud, who married Norwegian Prime Minister Jens Stoltenberg.

== Selected bibliography ==
This is a list of his most important publications:

- Akershus i dikterens speil (1991)
- Barn i Oslo: En billedkavalkade: barn i hovedstaden før og nå (1982)
- Iduns epler (1982)
- Året før året: 1904, et av disse fjerne år fra "den gode gamle tid" (1979)
- Ibsen og byen (1978)
- Hafslund gods: Fra Otte Bildt til M. G. Rosenkrantz (1974)
- Kongevei og fantesti (1974)
- På Grand i hundre år, 1874-1974 (1974)
- Helly-Hansen i hundre år (1970)
- Nordmenn i København (1962)
- Norsk kunstnerliv (1960)
- Den store Oslo-guiden (1955)
