= Hanne Marthe Narud =

Norwegian professor of political science

Hanne Marthe Narud (26 February 1958 – 20 July 2012) was a Norwegian political scientist.

She was awarded the cand.polit. degree in 1988 and the dr.polit. degree in 1996. She was a professor of political science at the University of Oslo, and as a scholar on political coalitions and election research she was widely cited in the media; in 2008 reported to be the most cited female scholar in the Norwegian press. In 2009 she was elected to the Norwegian Academy of Science and Letters.

She died in July 2012 after a short battle with cancer. She was a twin sister of politician Ole Gustav Narud.
