= Ole Gustav Narud =

Norwegian politician

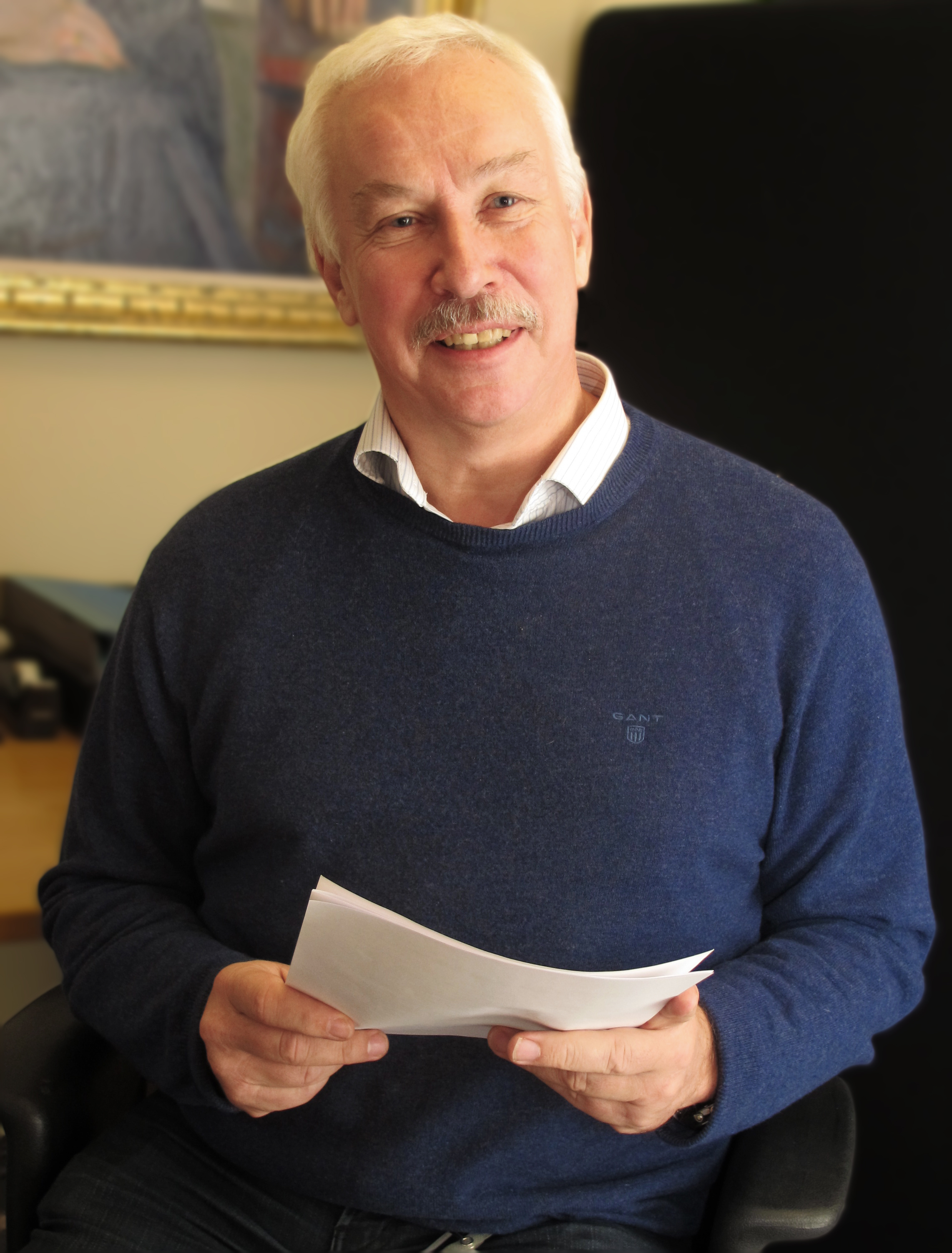
Ole Gustav Narud, 2014.

Ole Gustav Narud (born 26 February 1958) is a Norwegian politician for the Centre Party.

He was a deputy representative to the Parliament of Norway from Hedmark during the term 2009–2013, but without meeting in a parliamentary session. In October 2021 he was appointed to Støre's Cabinet as State Secretary in the Ministry of Local Government and Modernisation. He was the mayor of Åmot Municipality from 2003 to 2011 and from 2015 to 2019.

He was the twin brother of political scientist Hanne Marthe Narud (1958–2012).
