= Anne-Cath. Vestly =

Norwegian author of children's literature (1920–2008)

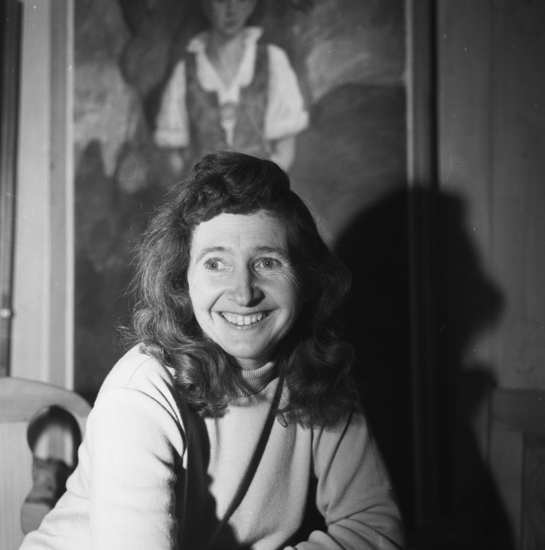
- Vestly in 1963
- Born: Anna Catharina Schulerud; February 15, 1920; Rena, Norway
- Died: December 15, 2008 (aged 88); Mjøndalen, Norway
- Occupation: Children's book author
- Spouse: Johan Vestly
- Children: 2 sons
- Writing career
- Period: 1950s–2002

Anne-Cath. Vestly (February 15, 1920 – December 15, 2008) was a Norwegian author of children's literature. She is known for a wide range of books published from 1953 to 2004. Vestly was best known for her series about a grandmother (Mormor) who looked after and shared numerous adventures with a flock of eight children.

== Biography ==
Vestly was born Anne Catharina Schulerud in the village of Rena in Åmot municipality in Hedmark, Norway. She was the daughter of Mentz Oliver Schulerud (1877–1931) and Aagot Schulerud (1875–1957). Her father was a pharmacist and owned a hardware store. Her mother was a schoolteacher. Vestly took her Examen artium at Lillehammer in 1939. She then moved with her mother to Oslo, where she studied at the University of Oslo, attended trade school, and became involved in amateur theater work.

She came into contact with radio programming in 1946 through her brother Mentz Schulerud, who was employed as program secretary at Norwegian Broadcasting (NRK). Vestly soon started her career with children's entertainment on the radio and television. Most of her books were first presented as readings on the NRK program Barnetimen for de minste. She also co-starred with Alf Prøysen in Kanutten og Romeo Klive (1963), a popular children's television show on NRK.

Vestly's first book, Ole Aleksander Filibom-bom-bom, eventually developed into a twelve-volume series. She challenged the traditional gender roles in the "Aurora" series (1966–1972), in which she depicts a family where the mother works as a lawyer, while the father, an ancient history Ph.D. candidate, stays at home with their two children.

Vestly's most famous work, Eight Children and a Truck (Åtte små, to store og en lastebil in Norwegian), concerns a family with eight children living in a small apartment in Oslo. It was the first in a series of nine books, the last of which was published in 2000, about the children’s maternal grandmother (Mormor). The series is known as the "Eight Children" series in English (Mormor og de åtte ungene in Norwegian) and was published in English translation by Methuen Publishing. Several of Vestly's books were adapted to film. She also worked as an actress, playing the role of Grandma on television and in the screen versions, Mormor og de åtte ungene i byen (1977) and Mormor og de åtte ungene i skogen (1979).

=== Personal life ===
In 1946, she married Johan Vestly (1923–1993). They were the parents of two sons: Jo (born 1948) and Håkon (born 1957). Vestly's husband illustrated all her books until his death in 1993. She was the sister of the author, radio personality, and theatre director Mentz Schulerud. She was also the aunt of Ingrid Schulerud, who was married to Norwegian prime minister, later Secretary General of NATO Jens Stoltenberg.

Anne-Cath. Vestly was diagnosed with Alzheimer's disease in early 2006. She spent her final years living in a nursing home in Mjøndalen, where she died in 2008 at the age of 88.

== Selected awards ==
- Riksmålsprisen, 1977
- Peer Gynt Prize, 1980
- Alf Prøysens Ærespris, 1986
- Norwegian Booksellers' Prize, 1986 (for the book Mormor og de åtte ungene på sykkeltur i Danmark)
- Spellemannprisen 1991 (for the album Marte og mormor og mormor og Morten 1–4)
- Royal Norwegian Order of St. Olav (Knight, First Class) 1992
- Norsk kulturråds ærespris, 1994
- Brage Prize Honorary Award, 1995
- Prillarguri Award, 2000

Awards
Preceded by Erik Bye	Recipient of the Norsk kulturråds ærespris 1994	Succeeded by Ole Henrik Moe
