= Rena, Norway =

Village in Innlandet, Norway

Rena
- Village
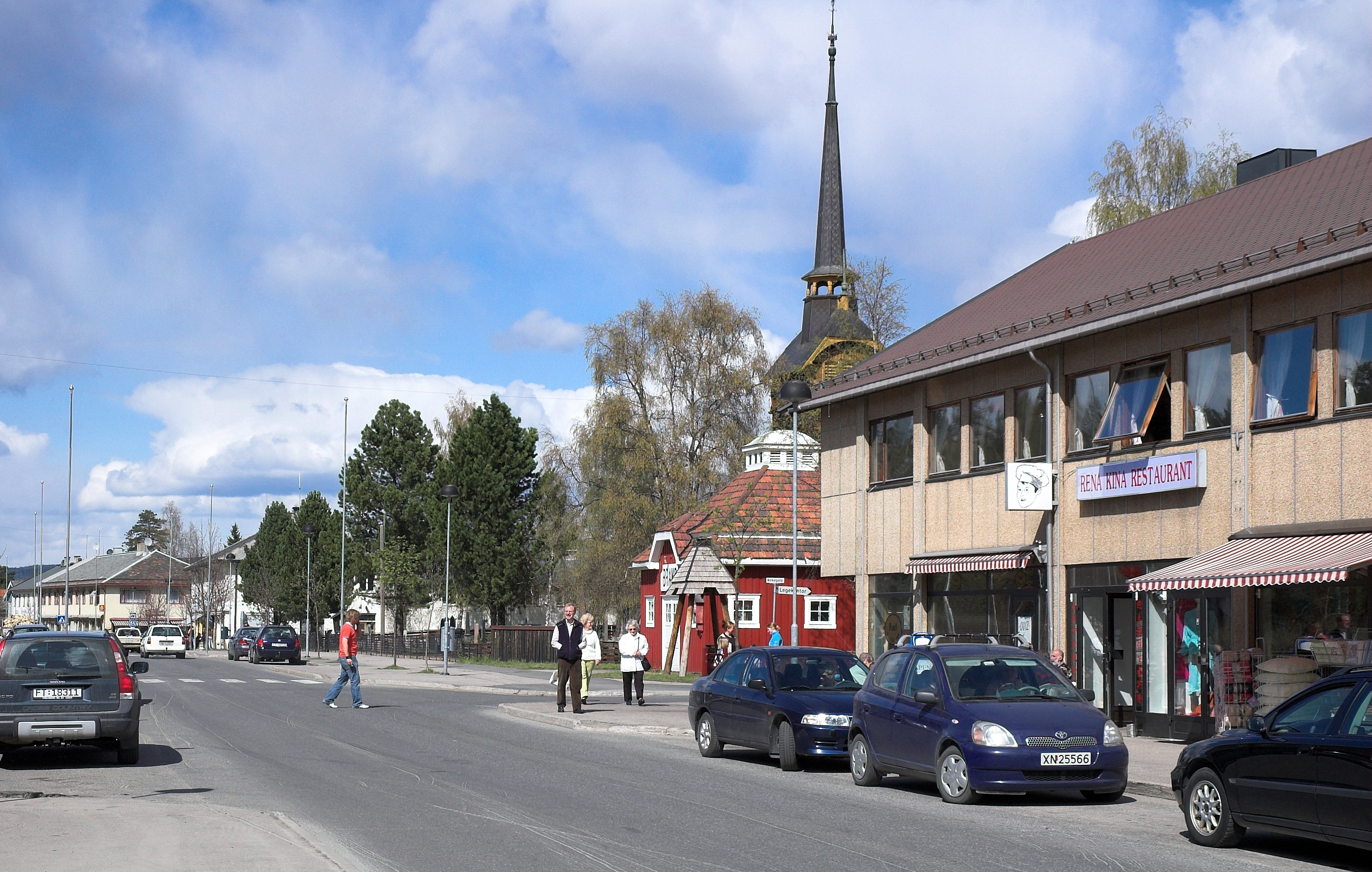
- View of the village centre
- Interactive map of Rena
- Location within Innlandet Location within Norway
- Coordinates: 61.13222°N 11.37156°E
- Country: Norway
- Region: Eastern Norway
- County: Innlandet
- District: Østerdalen
- Municipality: Åmot Municipality

Area
  - Total: 2.04 km^{2} (0.79 sq mi)
- Elevation: 223 m (732 ft)

Population (2024)
  - Total: 2,117
  - Density: 1,038/km^{2} (2,690/sq mi)
- Time zone: UTC+01:00 (CET)
  - Summer (DST): UTC+02:00 (CEST)
- Post Code: 2450 Rena

Rena is the administrative centre of Åmot Municipality in Innlandet county, Norway. The village is located at the confluence of the rivers Glomma (Norway's longest river) and Rena (a tributary to Glomma). It is located about 7 kilometres (4.3 mi) north of the village of Åsta and about 60 kilometres (37 mi) south of the village of Koppang. The 2.04-square-kilometre (500-acre) village has a population (2024) of 2,117 and a population density of 1,038 inhabitants per square kilometre (2,690/sq mi).

The Rena Campus of the Inland Norway University of Applied Sciences is located in Rena. It has a modern school building plus student dormitories at this site. There are also two Chinese restaurants, a public cinema, and several hotels in the village. Åmot Church is also located in the village as well. Rena is the starting point of both the Birkebeinerrennet ski race and the Birkebeinerrittet Mountain bike race.

The village lies within the Østerdalen valley which is a mountainous and forested area. The surrounding area has several lakes, forests and rivers. Just northeast of Rena is the Rena Military Camp, Norway's largest military camp. This area is used by the military for special forces training.

== History ==
In April 2026, Norway’s largest known Viking Era coin deposit was discovered. Named the Mørstad hoard, after the farm where it was found, it contains more than 3,000 coins dating to the late Viking Age. The majority originate from German and English mints, though Norwegian coins are also represented. The hoard is believed to have been assembled around 1050.

== Climate ==
Rena has a subarctic climate (Dfc) although it has some of the warmest summer days in Norway. Winters are very cold and snowy.

Climate data for Rina-Haugedalen 1961-1990, extremes 1954-1998
Month	Jan	Feb	Mar	Apr	May	Jun	Jul	Aug	Sep	Oct	Nov	Dec	Year
Record high °C (°F)	8.1 (46.6)	10.1 (50.2)	16.6 (61.9)	23.4 (74.1)	28.5 (83.3)	34.0 (93.2)	31.5 (88.7)	33.0 (91.4)	26.8 (80.2)	18.7 (65.7)	11.3 (52.3)	8.4 (47.1)	34.0 (93.2)
Mean daily maximum °C (°F)	−7.1 (19.2)	−4.4 (24.1)	2.4 (36.3)	7.8 (46.0)	15.2 (59.4)	20.2 (68.4)	20.9 (69.6)	18.9 (66.0)	13.3 (55.9)	6.6 (43.9)	−1.0 (30.2)	−5.7 (21.7)	7.3 (45.1)
Mean daily minimum °C (°F)	−15.6 (3.9)	−14.6 (5.7)	−9.6 (14.7)	−4.0 (24.8)	1.0 (33.8)	5.9 (42.6)	7.6 (45.7)	6.3 (43.3)	2.9 (37.2)	−0.6 (30.9)	−7.7 (18.1)	−13.4 (7.9)	−3.5 (25.7)
Record low °C (°F)	−41.1 (−42.0)	−40.2 (−40.4)	−34.9 (−30.8)	−21.0 (−5.8)	−10.0 (14.0)	−5.2 (22.6)	−2.7 (27.1)	−3.2 (26.2)	−12.0 (10.4)	−17.8 (0.0)	−29.0 (−20.2)	−39.0 (−38.2)	−41.1 (−42.0)
Average precipitation mm (inches)	50 (2.0)	38 (1.5)	40 (1.6)	42 (1.7)	62 (2.4)	78 (3.1)	90 (3.5)	79 (3.1)	85 (3.3)	80 (3.1)	67 (2.6)	55 (2.2)	766 (30.1)
Average precipitation days	10.1	7.8	8.4	7.5	10.3	11.4	12.6	12.2	11.4	11.4	10.9	10.4	124.4
Source: Met Norway Eklima
