= Viking coinage =

Type of currency

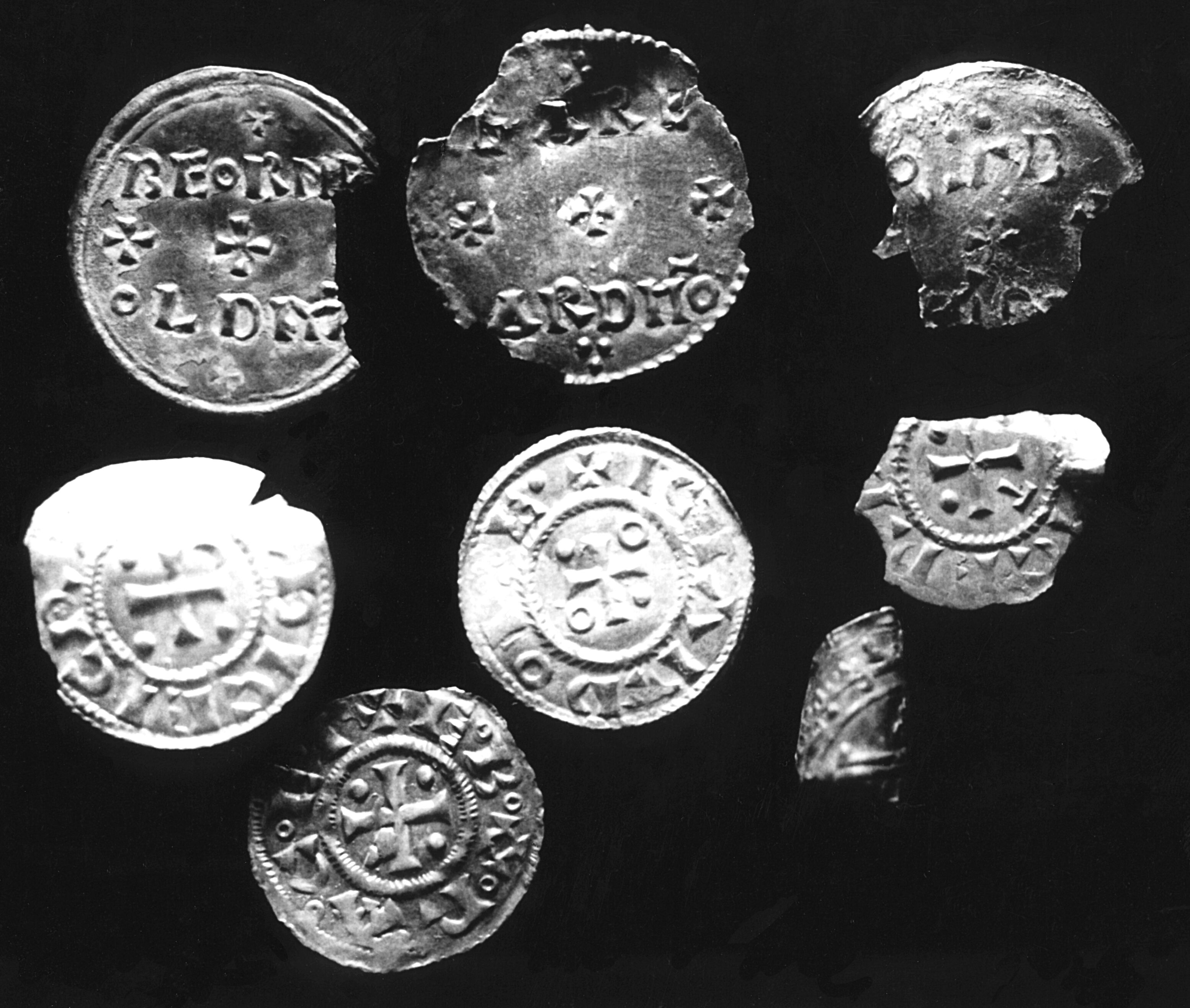
Viking coin hoard found between 1992 and 2000, likely minted between 923 and 925 within the Danelaw kingdoms.

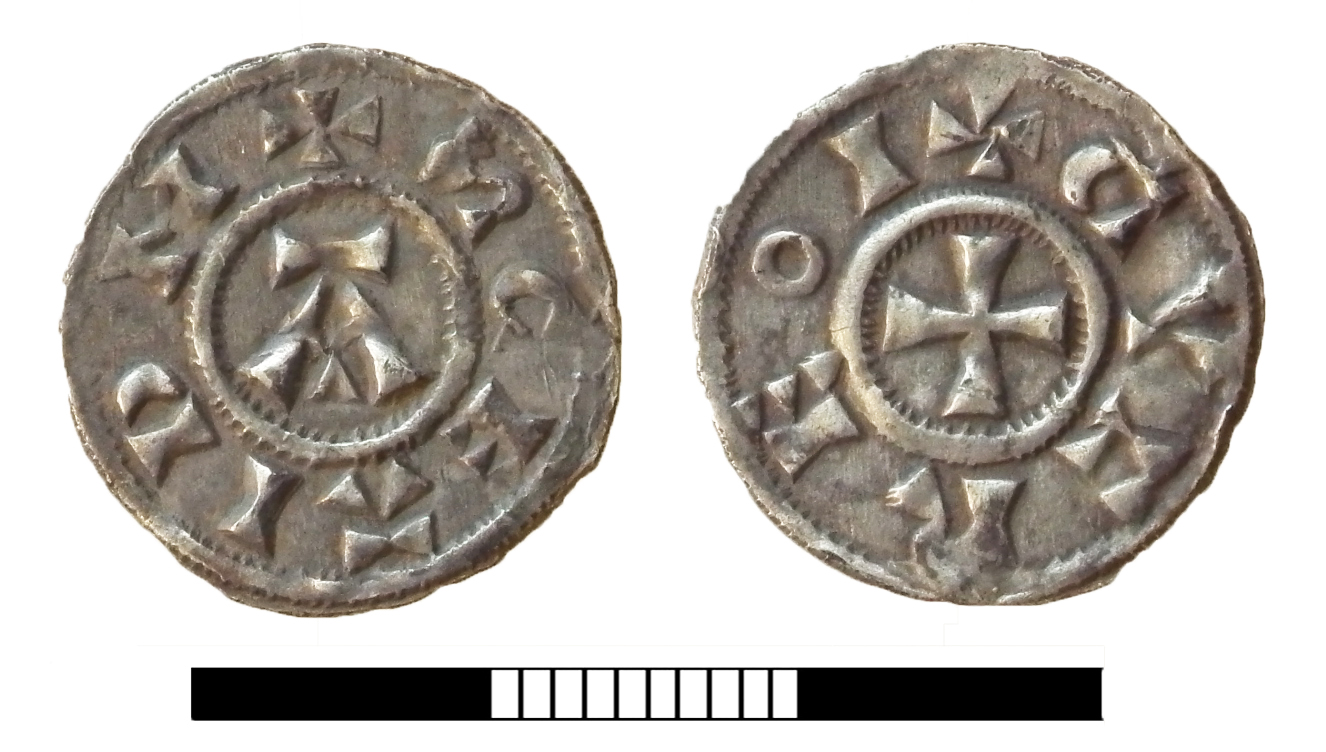
Early medieval coin, East Anglian Viking penny

Viking coinage was used during the Viking Age of northern Europe. Prior to the usage and minting of coins, the Viking economy was predominantly a bullion economy, where the weight and size of a particular metal is used as a method of evaluating value, as opposed to the value being determined by the specific type of coin. By the ninth century, the Viking raids brought them into contact with cultures well familiarised with the use of coins in economies of Europe, hence influencing the Vikings own production of coins.

Within Scandinavia itself, Vikings were aware of coins from various regions including the Arab areas of the day, bringing further influence. Before minting of their own coinage, a flow of international coins provided the basis for an early economy with which to develop.

Danish ruled kingdoms in the British Isles, known as the Danelaw, began to model their own coins on rulers in addition to various Christian imagery. Within Scandinavia, the adoption of particular coinages within each of the Danish, Swedish and Norwegian coinages became evident towards the late 990s. As with most coins of the period, including within the Danelaw, the majority of these were modelled on the rulers of these particular regions. Each kingdom had varying success with the introduction and consequent use of their own coinage.

The finds of multiple silver hoards within the United Kingdom and Scandinavia, provide evidence of the types and design of coins of the various Viking rulers and kings and the influence of outside cultures. Such hoards include the Cuerdale (consisting of some 7000 coins) and Silverdale hoards in the UK. The majority of the Cuerdale hoard can be found in the British Museum. In addition, hoards found in Denmark and Sweden show a large proportion of Arabic coins, as well as other forms of bullion such as bracelets and jewellery.

== Background and Bullion Economy ==
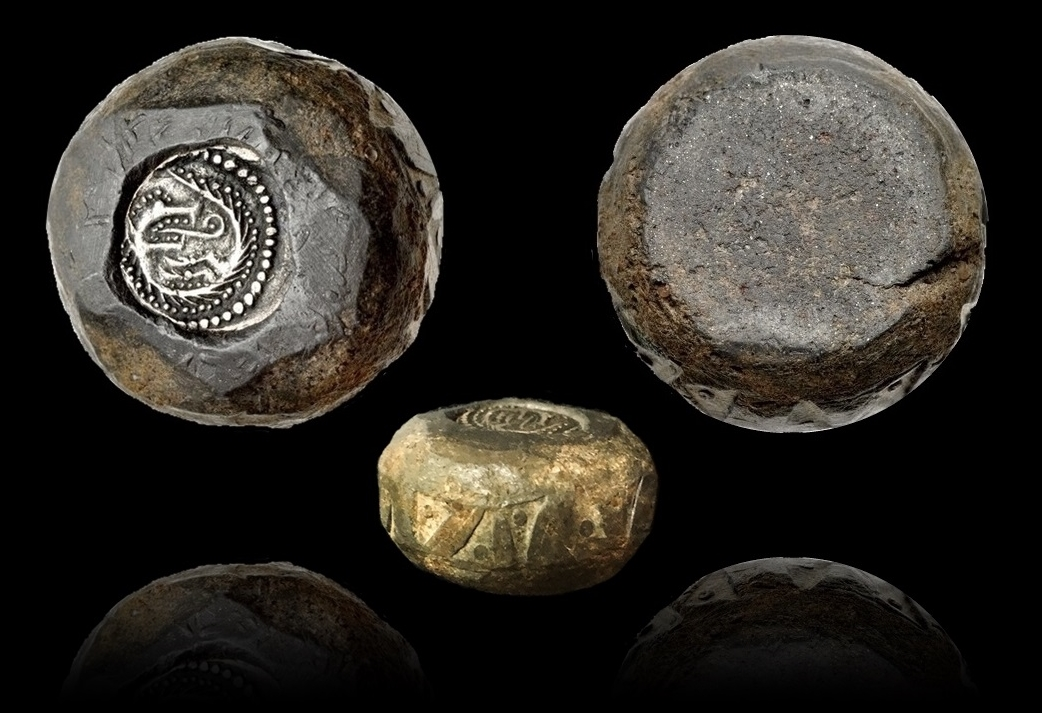
Anglo-Saxon-Viking coin weight, used for trading bullion and hacksilver: Material is lead and weighs around 36 g (1.3 oz). It is embedded with an Anglo-Saxon sceat dating to 720–750 and minted in Kent. It is edged in a dotted triangle pattern. Origin is the Danelaw region and dates to 870–930.

The early Viking age saw a predominantly bullion economy within society. Some suggest Scandinavian coins developed in the town of Ribe towards the early eighth century with evidence of Danish sceattas, however no archaeological remains of a particular mint have been found. The development of a bullion economy within the Viking Age saw goods exchanged for precious metals based on their weight and size as opposed to use of a particular type of coin. Silver was the most used metal within the economy as a means of trading. The silver was often weighed using lead weights and in order to safeguard people's wealth, melted down to be shaped into various other forms (such as bracelets and other jewellery). Scales brought with traders allowed weights of such metals to be accurately accounted for, therefore allowing an easier system of exchange between parties within the Viking age prior to coinage. As well as these various precious metals being used as a means of exchange, precious metals became a symbol of power and wealth within society.

Towards the ninth century, raids took Vikings into contact with various towns and villages around the North and Irish Sea. Naturally, following raids of foreign nations, the Vikings became more accustomed to and more involved in local politics and economics. As a result, silver being used as a method of payment became more influential. The various Anglo-Saxon kingdoms already had their own coinage in use, which was often used to pay Vikings off in attempts to avoid raids, not necessarily always being successful. In addition to the influence of Anglo-Saxon coins, about 35% of coins entering Scandinavia were of Oriental descent, representing the wide-ranging influence of cultures outside the Viking kingdoms having important influences in the development of their own currencies and coinages.

== Scandinavia ==
=== Denmark ===
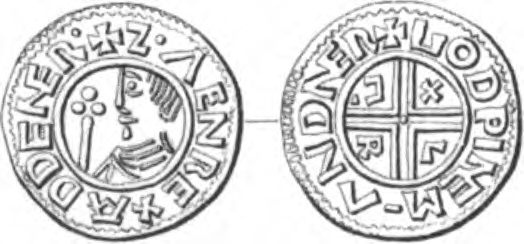
Coin depicting Sweyn Forkbeard, king of Denmark from 986 to 1014, minted in 995. Inscription reads: ZVEN REX AD DENER "Sven, king of [or among] the Danes" and GOD-WINE M-AN D-NER "Godwine, moneyer among the Danes"

The earliest known issued coins out of Viking age Denmark came under king Sweyn Forkbeard around the year 995. These coins had various inscriptions including the name of Sweyn, as well as the issuing authority of the coins (GODWINE M-AN DNER: Godwine moneyer among the Danes), and the coins were made of silver. In following centuries, many coins were based on silver and their value determined by weight. These have been found to be few and minted at an unidentified site. Sweyn, along with Norwegian king Olaf Tryggvasson, had previously commanded the Viking invading force into England, leading to the enforcement of Danegeld (the English king Æthelred II, was required to pay the Danish: known as Danegeld). The English coins used as payment became some of the early prototypes for these Danish coins. The main two developments common in Denmark became: pennies highly similar to those minted within England, but struck in Denmark with images of the English king and name; and also pennies modelled on those made in England but with images more directly linked to Denmark.

During the reign of Svend Estridsen, many Danish coins had a strong imitation of Byzantine types and towards the latter part of his reign, pennies had impressions of Danish runic characters. Later between 1074 and 1080, under the reign of Harald Hen, Denmark moved more to a nationalised currency and coinage.

The initial implementation of the Danish coinage began well, becoming further consolidated and established under the rule of Cnut, whereby the kingdoms of both Denmark and England were more united. Under Cnut in the 1020s came some of the first organised coinage, principally minted in Lund, but also found to be minted in multiple other cities such as Ribe, Hedeby and Aalborg.

=== Norway ===
As in other parts of Viking Scandinavia, imports of coinages and coins from various regions of the world, entered their way into present day Norway as a result of increased trade. Across the Viking lands about 150 finds of coins found approximately 400 Arabian, 3300 Norwegian and a similar number of English coins. Some of the earliest issued coins within Norway itself came from around the 990s and were designed with the image of Olaf Tryggvasson, the king of Norway from 995 to 1000. Locally issued coinage is likely to have continued within Norway, evidenced from the composition of multiple found coin hoards. Under the reign of King Harald Sigurdsson, after having gained knowledge and experience in currencies during his service with the Byzantine emperor, a national currency was established. Generally, the pennies were issued with an approximate weight of 0.89 grams. Initially, these coins contained a high amount of silver, but gradually silver was dropped in overall content with higher percentages of copper being used instead, (particularly under Olaf Haraldsson). Nidarnes is likely to have been the location of the main mint of Norwegian coins under the rule of Haraldsson.

Initially, the distributed coinage within Norway, had a delicate start, but under the rule of Harald Hardrada, became much more influential.

Coins of various Norwegian kings/rulers

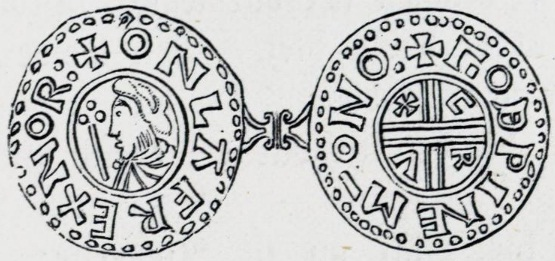
Coin of Olaf Tryggvason. An imitation of Æthelred II

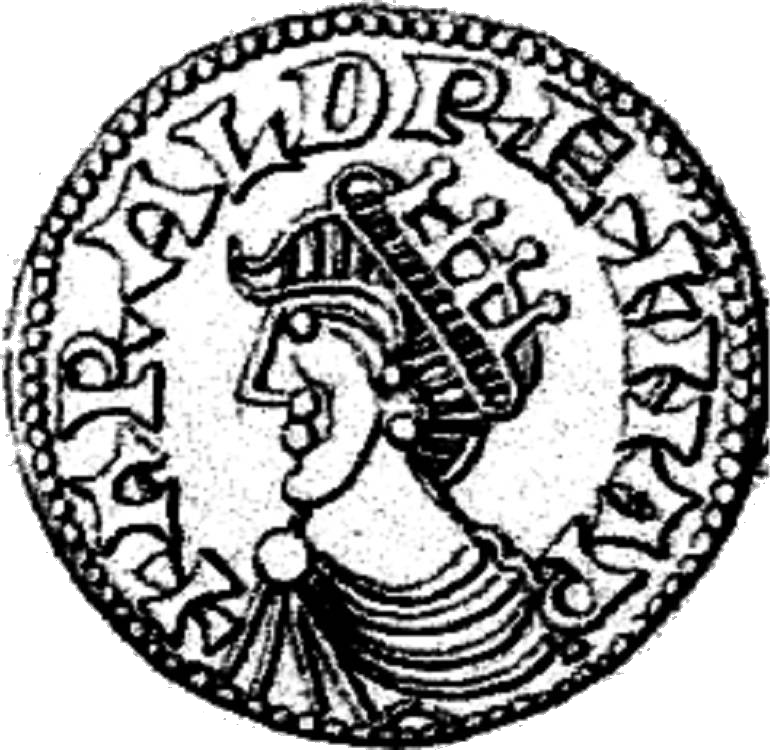
Coin representing king Harald Sigurdsson of Norway

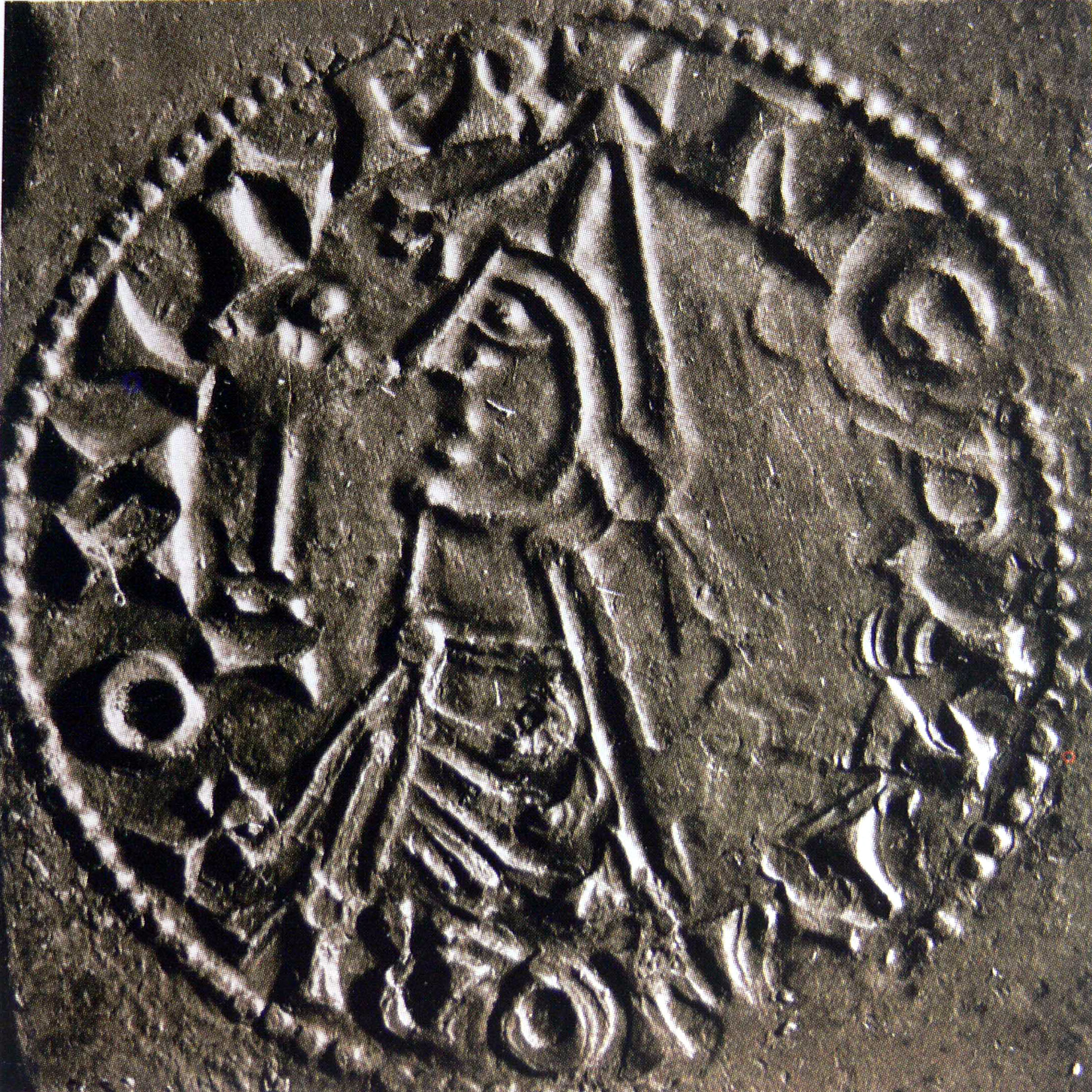
Coin showing the image of Olaf II Haraldsson, of Norway, dated 1023–28

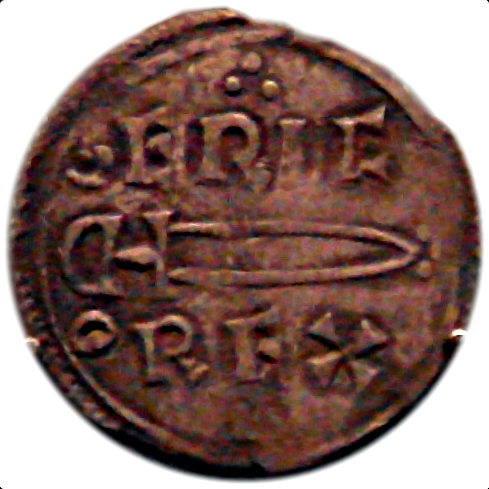
Coin of Eric Bloodaxe, King of Norway, and King of Northumbria. Reads "ERIC REX" - King Eric. From British Museum

=== Sweden ===
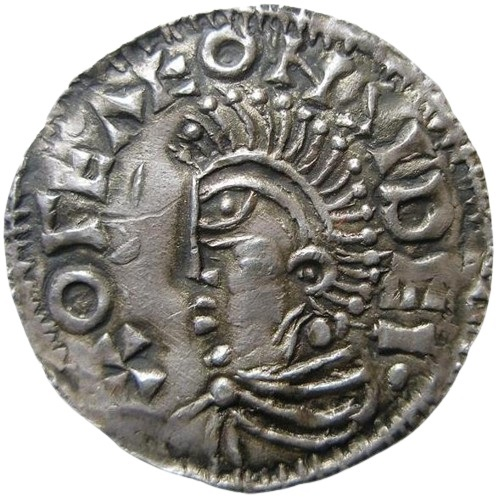
Coin of Olof Skötkonung, minted at Sigtuna

The import of foreign coins into Sweden started around the year 800, continuing until approximately 1150 when the local minting of coins became more common. Predominantly, dirhams were imported into Sweden via Russia, with additional circulation coming from Germany, England and elsewhere. A high silver content was necessary providing weight standards for which to value the bullion.

Sweden’s native coinage began towards the 990s with the king Olof Skötkonung, issuing coins with his own image and title. The royal coinage was mainly produced around the town of Sigtuna and based on English coinage. Finds have linked these coins to Sigtuna based on die links as well as relationships between the imagery. King Anund Jacob continued the minting of coins in Sigtuna but was discontinued towards the end of his reign. The minting was likely resumed under the reign of King Canute I.

Generally, the coinage was primitive in comparison to others of the period, with varying weight and meaningless inscriptions. These coins could have been used as a means of payment for soldiers as opposed to having a sole use in trading, resulting in this primitive type of coinage. Christian imagery and resemblances were common in early Swedish coinage, modelling Anglo-Saxon coinage including inscriptions such as ‘IN NOMINE DOMINI’, meaning ‘In the name of the Lord’, as well as cross symbols. Coinage from Sigtuna came to a conclusion around 1030.

== Danelaw ==
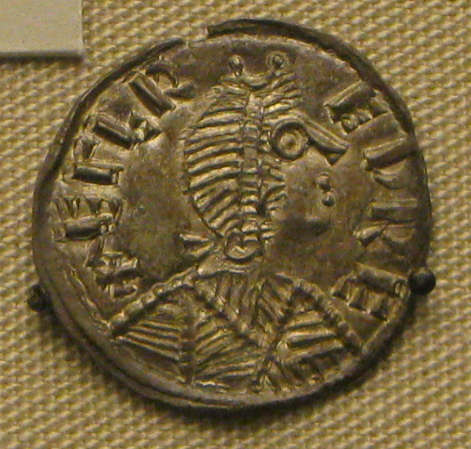
Alfred the Great silver coin

The Danelaw, a region located in present-day United Kingdom which came under the rule of the Danes from approximately the 9th century to the 11th century, began to use coins influenced by the Danish. The earliest phases of coinage, under Viking rule were predominantly imitative of nearby coinages. Few of these imitations modelled themselves on Viking rulers and kings, with many holding the name of King Alfred (king of the Anglo-Saxons) and being struck to a weight standard of approximately 1.6g. The minting of many of these coins, continued on from Anglo-Saxon production prior to invasion through to the 870s and 880s, but with some signs of Scandinavian rule.

The mid 890s saw a development in the introduction and development of national coinages within the two main kingdoms of the Danelaw. York saw the regal coinages with names of rulers Siefred and Cnut, while East Anglia replaced the coinage of King Alfred to St Edmund. The St Edmund coinage often displayed signs Christian imagery. The earliest known coins from Vikings in the kingdom of York came from Guthred. Evidence suggests it is of Anglo-Saxon type, bearing king's name, a cross and the moneyer's name. The coinages of Cnut and Siefred also rely on regal and Christian imagery as well as influences from the Byzantine coins.

Christian imagery was common in coins issued in the Danelaw kingdom. This includes inscriptions such as DOMINUS DEUS REX (Lord God and King) as well as Christian imagery such as the Christian cross. Scandinavian influences on the coinages are also evident in addition to the Christian imagery, such as the hammer of the Norse god Thor and other references. The inscriptions under King Olaf demonstrate Scandinavian influence. Many of the Viking coins that display images of Thor and Odin are accompanied with Christian symbols as well, while the use of Old Norse developed a distinctive line of coins apart from Anglo-Saxon kings. Olaf Guthfrithson demonstrated a heavier use of Norse symbols.

== Hoards and Viking coins today ==
Many of the hoards found regarding Viking coins date between the 9th and 11th centuries come from the British Isles. The finds can often be found in museums such as the British Museum and consist mostly of silver goods.

Some of the silver hoards found within Denmark include 1751 coins from Terslev with 1708 of these coins being of Arabian descent. The latest issue of coins found within this hoard came from the year 944. Other hoards found within Denmark, consist of pendants, strap fittings, bracelets, silver beads and silver fragments. These include hoards from Duesminde and Vedsted which can be found at the National Museum of Denmark. There also existed some gold hoards such as finds in Hornelund which are also at the National Museum of Denmark.

In Sweden, two thirds of coin finds come from Gotland with finds of approximately 259 524 coins from the Viking Age across all of Sweden. In addition to those in Gotland, significant finds have been made on the island of Oland, off the Swedish coast. Eighth and ninth century coins found here are generally made up of Arabic coins mostly. By the eleventh century, hoards finds reduced, with a higher proportion of western European coins.

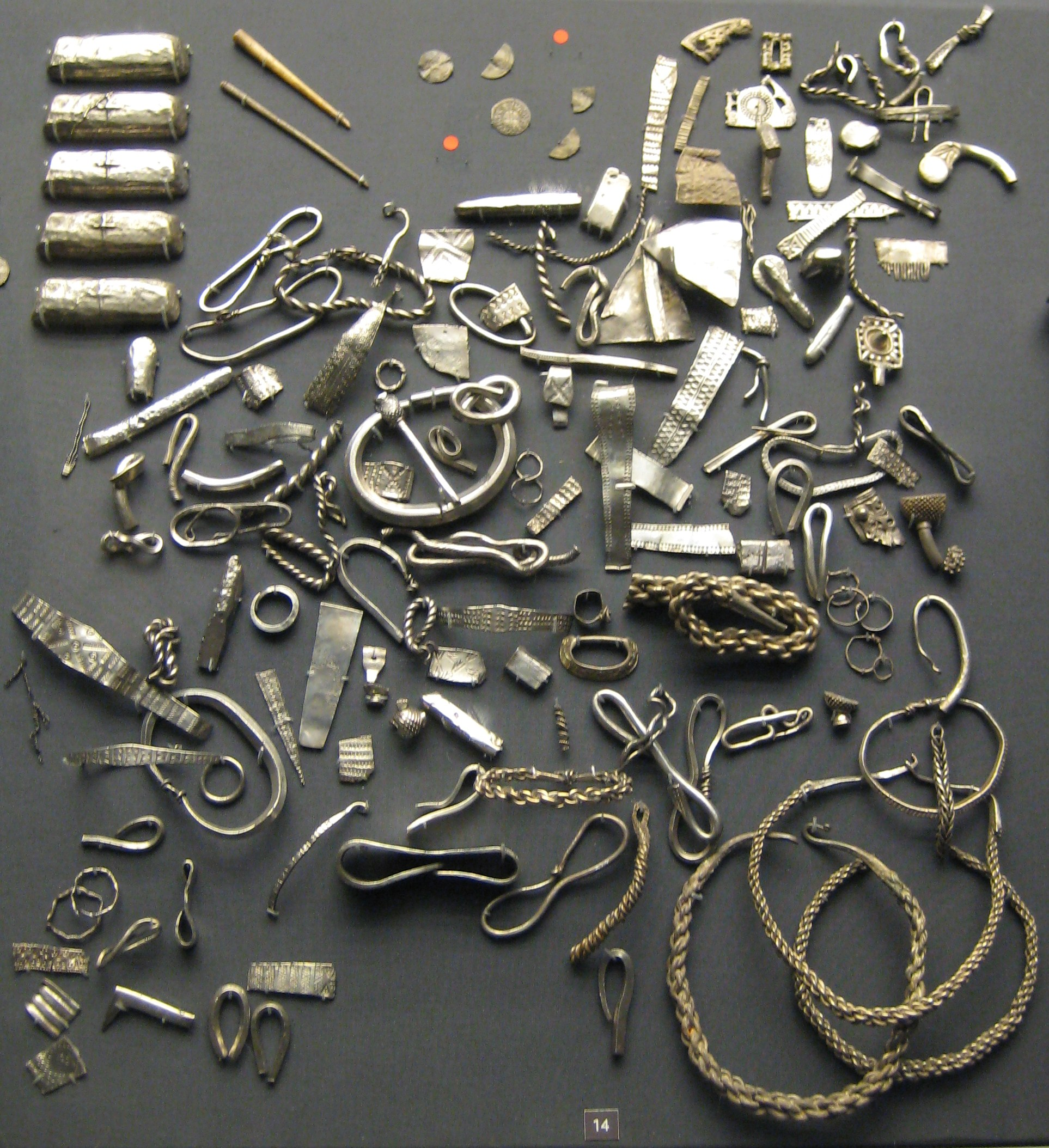
The Cuerdale Hoard on display at the British Museum

In the United Kingdom, dating to c.895, the Ashdon Hoard found in Ashdon include 71 silver pennies. The majority of coins show Alfred the Great, with others having the name of Guthrum, Guthfrith and other uncertain coins. Four of the coins found in the hoard are located within the British Museum with the rest in Fitzwilliam Museum, and two in the Saffron Walden Museum.

One of the largest Viking silver hoards found is the Cuerdale Hoard, consisting of approximately 8600 items including silver coins, and weighing around 40 kg. The composition of the coins likely suggest that it was buried between 905 and 910. Of the items found, there are approximately 7000 coins, mainly being of Anglo-Saxon and Danelaw issue. In addition to these coins, some international Frankish coins were present as well as early Scandinavian coins. The Byzantine and Scandinavian coins would likely have come from Scandinavia in transition to Britain. As well as the coins found in the hoard, over 36 kg was bullion, mainly consisting of silver jewellery and other smaller metals. The majority of the find, can presently be found in the British Museum.

The Silverdale Hoard found in Silverdale, Lancashire consists of around 27 coins, and in total 200 pieces of jewellery. In particular, some coins have the inscription DNS (Dominus) REX, reflecting the Christian ideals while also having inscriptions of AIRDECONUT, likely being the Scandinavian name of Harthacnut. It includes coins of Alfred the Great. The collection of coins contains Anglo-Viking, Anglo-Saxon, Arabic and Frankish coins as well as those from Northumbria representing the wide-ranging cultural contacts of the Vikings and the influences of their coinages. The other items of jewellery form a basis for trading within a bullion economy.

== See also ==
- Rings in Germanic cultures - items commonly used in trading systems in the Viking age
