= Råsån =

Lake in Nord-Odal, Norway

- Råsen (historic spelling)
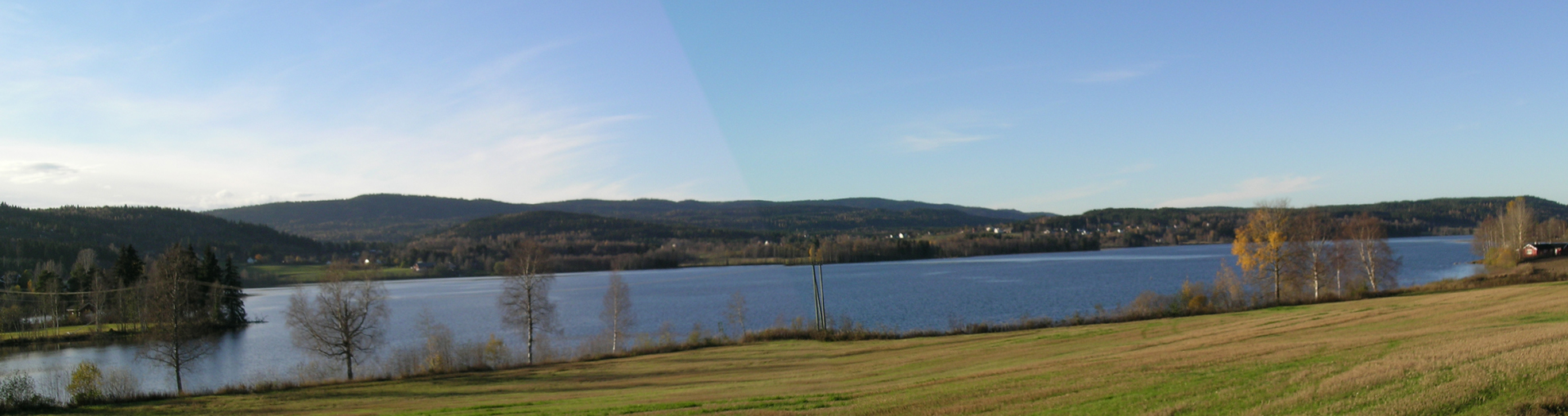
- Interactive map of the lake
- Location: Nord-Odal Municipality, Innlandet
- Coordinates: 60°24′23″N 11°30′28″E
- Primary inflows: Trautåa river
- Primary outflows: Sollauståa river
- Basin countries: Norway
- Max. length: 3.2 kilometres (2.0 mi)
- Max. width: 1.1 kilometres (0.68 mi)
- Surface area: 2.3034 km^{2} (0.8893 sq mi)
- Max. depth: 11.5 metres (38 ft)
- Shore length^{1}: 10 kilometres (6.2 mi)
- Surface elevation: 136 metres (446 ft)
- References: NVE
- ^{1} Shore length is not a well-defined measure.

Råsån is a lake in Nord-Odal Municipality in Innlandet county, Norway. The 2.3-square-kilometre (0.89 sq mi) lake lies just north of the village of Sand. The Norwegian County Road 181 runs along the southern end of the lake. The lake flows out into the river Sollauståa, which runs for about 2 kilometres (1.2 mi) to the south before emptying into the large lake Storsjøen.

== See also ==
- List of lakes in Norway
