= Lise Selnes =

Norwegian politician

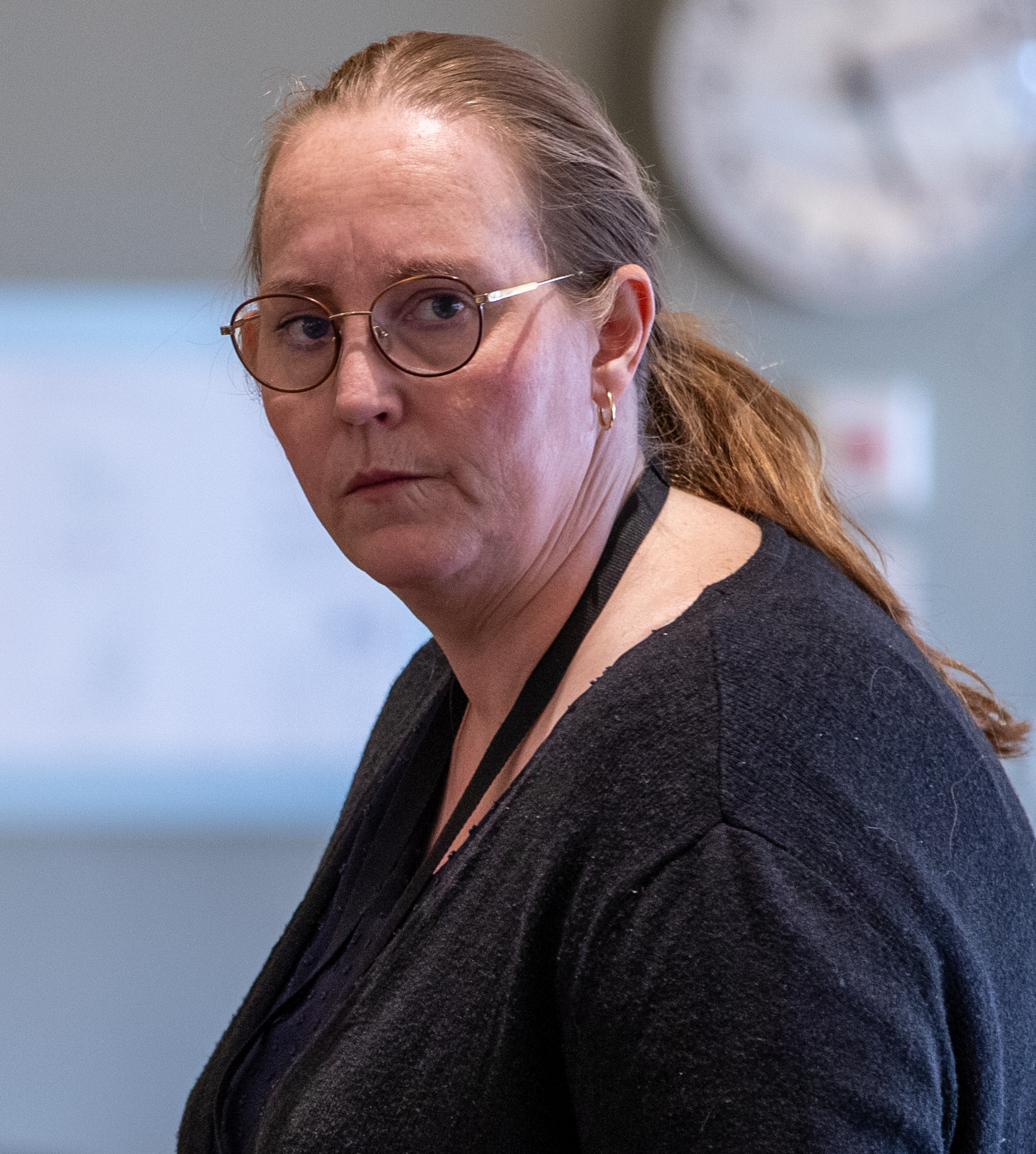
- Selnes in 2024

Second Vice President of the Storting
- Incumbent
- Assumed office 10 October 2025
- President: Masud Gharahkhani (Ap)
- Preceded by: Nils T. Bjørke (Sp)

Member of the Storting
- Incumbent
- Assumed office 1 October 2021
- Constituency: Hedmark

Mayor of Nord-Odal municipality
- In office 2011–2021
- Deputy: Lasse Juliussen (Ap) (2011-2015, 2017-2019); Lasse Weckhorst (Ap) (2015-2017); Ragnhild Haagenrud Moen (Sp) (2019-2021)
- Preceded by: Asgeir Østli (Ap)
- Succeeded by: Ragnhild Haagenrud Moen (Sp)

Personal details
- Born: 11 November 1976 (age 49)
- Party: Labour
- Occupation: Schoolteacher; Politician

Lise Selnes (born 11 November 1976) is a Norwegian schoolteacher and politician. A member of the Labour Party, she has served as a member of the Storting for Hedmark since 2021 and second vice president of the Storting since 2025. She previously served as the mayor of Nord-Odal Municipality from 2011 until her election to the Storting in 2021.

== Political career ==
=== Local politics ===
She was mayor of Nord-Odal Municipality from 2011 to 2021. At the time of her election, she was the first woman to serve as mayor of the municipality. She was re-elected in 2015 and 2019. She resigned in 2021 upon winning a seat to the Storting at the 2021 parliamentary election and was succeeded by deputy mayor Ragnhild Haagenrud Moen.

She became leader of the Innlandet Labour Party in 2021.

=== Parliament ===
She was elected representative to the Storting from the constituency of Hedmark at the 2021 election. She was re-elected in 2025. In the Storting, she was a member of the Standing Committee on Education, Research and Church Affairs from 2021 to 2025. She was elected as the second Vice President of the Storting in October 2025, succeeding Nils T. Bjørke from the Centre Party.

== Personal life ==
Hailing from Stange Municipality, Selnes worked as teacher in Nord-Odal Municipality from 1999. She has three children.
