= Storsjoen =

Storsjo, Storsjoe, or Storsjoen can mean:

== Places ==
- Storsjøen (Odal), lake in the Odal valley in Innlandet county, Norway
- Storsjøen (Rendalen), a lake in Rendalen municipality in Innlandet county, Norway
- Storsjøen (Tolga), a lake in Tolga municipality in Innlandet county, Norway
- Storsjön, lake in Jämtland, Sweden
  - Storsjöodjuret, legendary monster in Storsjön
