= Mo, Innlandet =

Village in Nord-Odal Municipality, Norway

Mo
- Village
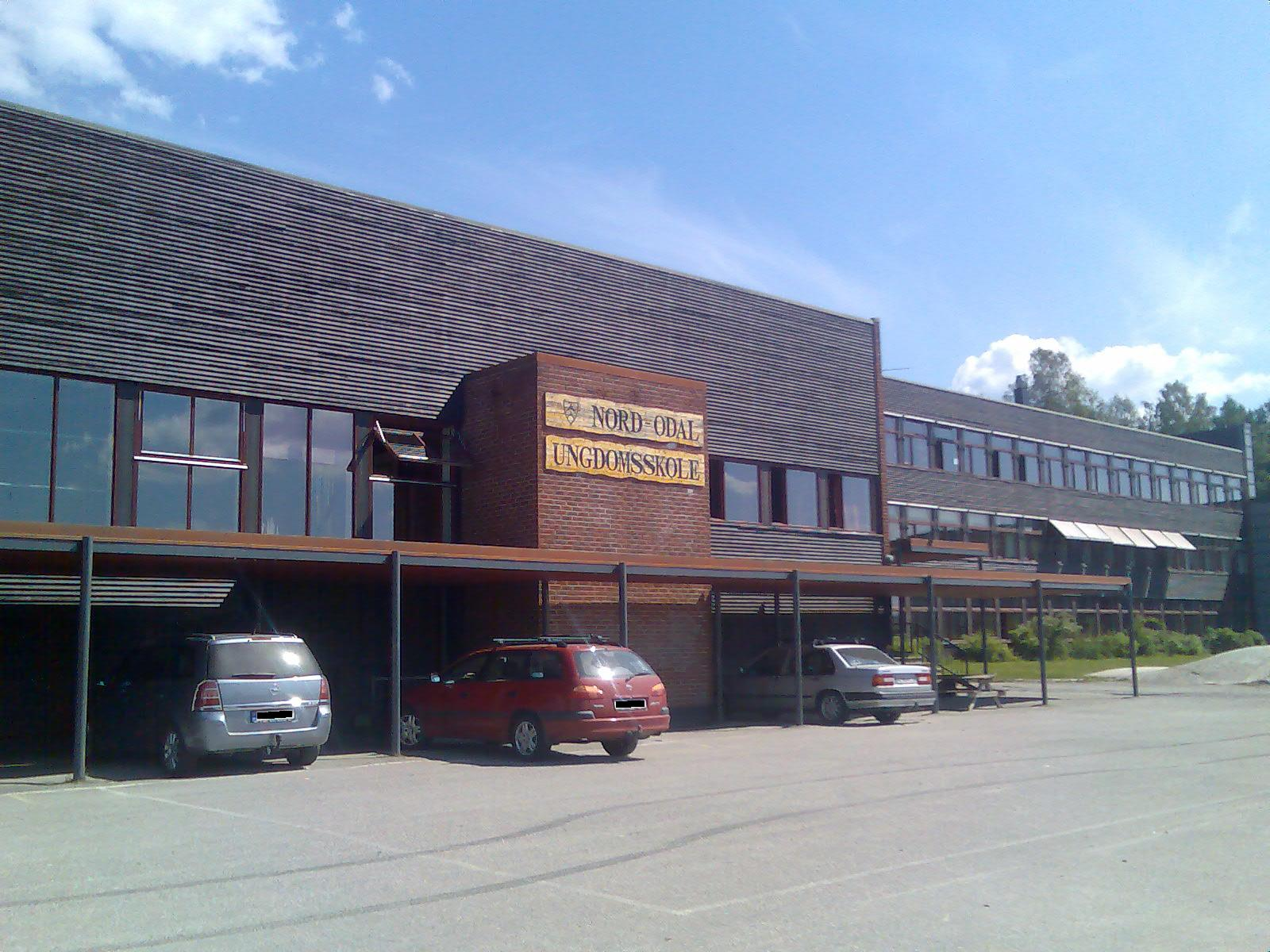
- The village school
- Interactive map of Mo
- Location within Innlandet Location within Norway
- Coordinates: 60.42796°N 11.64007°E
- Country: Norway
- Region: Eastern Norway
- County: Innlandet
- District: Odalen
- Municipality: Nord-Odal Municipality

Area
  - Total: 0.58 km^{2} (0.22 sq mi)
- Elevation: 141 m (463 ft)

Population (2024)
  - Total: 413
  - Density: 712/km^{2} (1,840/sq mi)
- Time zone: UTC+01:00 (CET)
  - Summer (DST): UTC+02:00 (CEST)
- Post Code: 2133 Gardvik

Mo is a village in Nord-Odal Municipality in Innlandet county, Norway. It is located at the northern end of the lake Storsjøen. The village of Knapper lies about 5 kilometres (3.1 mi) to the north of Mo and the village of Sand lies about 8 kilometres (5.0 mi) to the west of Mo. Mo Church and an elementary school are both located in this village.

The 0.58-square-kilometre (140-acre) village has a population (2024) of 413 and a population density of 712 inhabitants per square kilometre (1,840/sq mi).
