= Sand, Innlandet =

Village in Nord-Odal Municipality, Norway

Sand
- Village
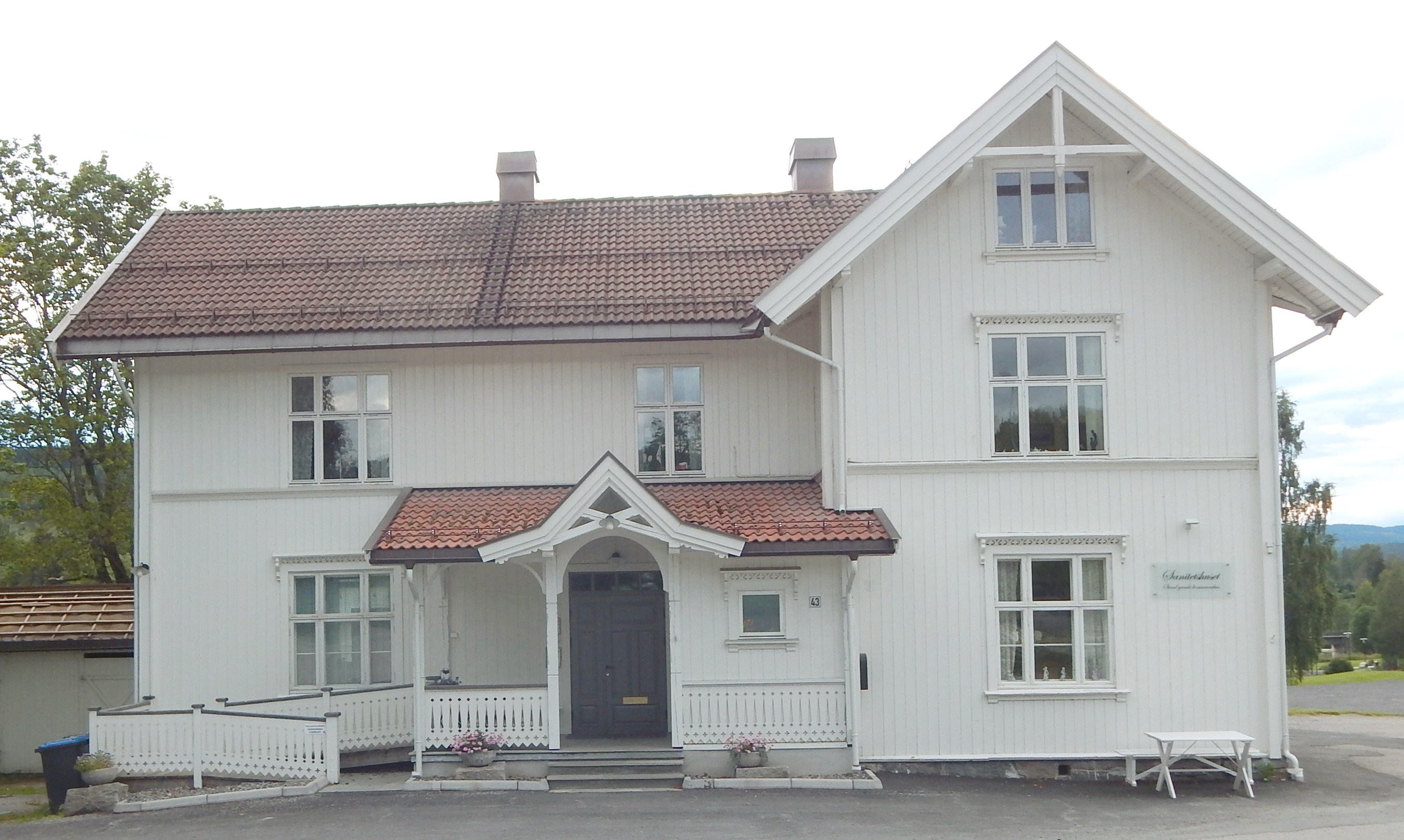
- View of the old municipal building
- Interactive map of Sand
- Location within Innlandet Location within Norway
- Coordinates: 60.39221°N 11.5403°E
- Country: Norway
- Region: Eastern Norway
- County: Innlandet
- District: Odalen
- Municipality: Nord-Odal Municipality

Area
  - Total: 1.33 km^{2} (0.51 sq mi)
- Elevation: 147 m (482 ft)

Population (2024)
  - Total: 1,131
  - Density: 850/km^{2} (2,200/sq mi)
- Time zone: UTC+01:00 (CET)
  - Summer (DST): UTC+02:00 (CEST)
- Post Code: 2120 Sagstua

Sand was the administrative centre of Nord-Odal Municipality in Innlandet county, Norway. The village layed between two lakes, Råsån and the northwestern arm of Storsjøen. The village of Mo layed about 8 kilometres (5.0 mi) to the east of Sand. Sand Church layed in the village. This village was the eastern terminus of the Norwegian County Road 181.

The 1.33-square-kilometre (330-acre) village had a population (2024) of 1,131 and a population density of 850 inhabitants per square kilometre (2,200/sq mi).
