= Júlíusson =

Júlíusson or Juliusson may refer to:

- Heiðar Geir Júlíusson (born 1987), Icelandic footballer
- Jökull Júlíusson (born 1990), Icelandic singer-songwriter, lead singer of Kaleo
- Karl Júlíusson, Icelandic-born film production and costume designer who resides in Norway
- Kristján Þór Júlíusson (born 1957), Icelandic politician, member of Alþingi, Minister of Fisheries and Agriculture
- Ólafur Júlíusson (born 1951), retired Icelandic football midfielder
- Rúnar Júlíusson (1945–2008), Icelandic pop singer, music producer and footballer
- Sigþór Júlíusson (born 1975), retired Icelandic football defender
- Theódór Júlíusson (born 1949), Icelandic actor

== See also ==
- Juliussen
