= Mo Church (Innlandet) =

Church in Innlandet, Norway

- Mo kirke
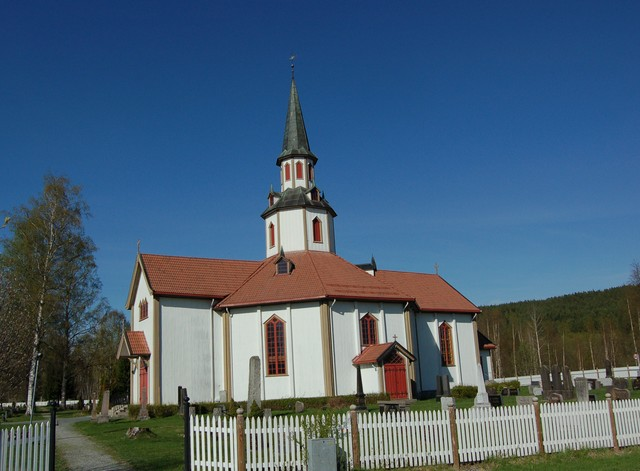
- View of the church
- Mo Church
- 60°25′44″N 11°38′09″E
- Location: Nord-Odal Municipality, Innlandet
- Country: Norway
- Denomination: Church of Norway
- Previous denomination: Catholic Church
- Churchmanship: Evangelical Lutheran

History
- Status: Parish church
- Founded: 13th century
- Consecrated: 6 December 1864

Architecture
- Functional status: Active
- Architect: Christian Heinrich Grosch
- Architectural type: Octagonal
- Style: Neo-Gothic
- Completed: 1864 (162 years ago)

Specifications
- Capacity: 500
- Materials: Wood

Administration
- Diocese: Hamar bispedømme
- Deanery: Solør, Vinger og Odal prosti
- Parish: Mo
- Norwegian Cultural Heritage Site
- Type: Church
- Status: Protected
- ID: 84966

Mo Church (Norwegian: Mo kirke) is a parish church of the Church of Norway in Nord-Odal Municipality in Innlandet county, Norway. It is located in the village of Mo. It is the church for the Mo parish which is part of the Solør, Vinger og Odal prosti (deanery) in the Diocese of Hamar. The white, wooden church was built in a octagonal design in 1864 using plans drawn up by the architect Christian Heinrich Grosch. The church seats about 500 people.

== History ==
The earliest existing historical records of the church date back to the year 1394, but the church was not built that year. The first church at Mo was a wooden stave church that was likely built during the early 13th century. This church was located about 700 metres (2,300 ft) to the southwest of the present church site. This church was dedicated to the Archangel Michael. Not much is known about the look of the old building.

From 1862 to 1864, a new neo-Gothic church was built about 700 metres (2,300 ft) to the northeast of the old church on a site that was closer to the centre of the village and to the main road. This new octagonal building was designed by Christian Heinrich Grosch. In addition to the octagonal nave, there is a square choir and small sacristy that extend to the east and a church porch that extends to the west. The new building was consecrated on 6 December 1864 by the Bishop Halvor Folkestad. After the new church was completed, the old church was torn down. The new church was restored in both 1931 and 1978.

== Media gallery ==
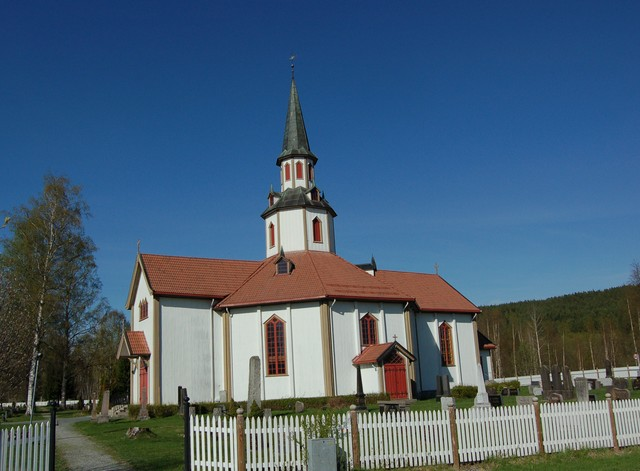
View of the church
Credit: www.kirkenorge.no

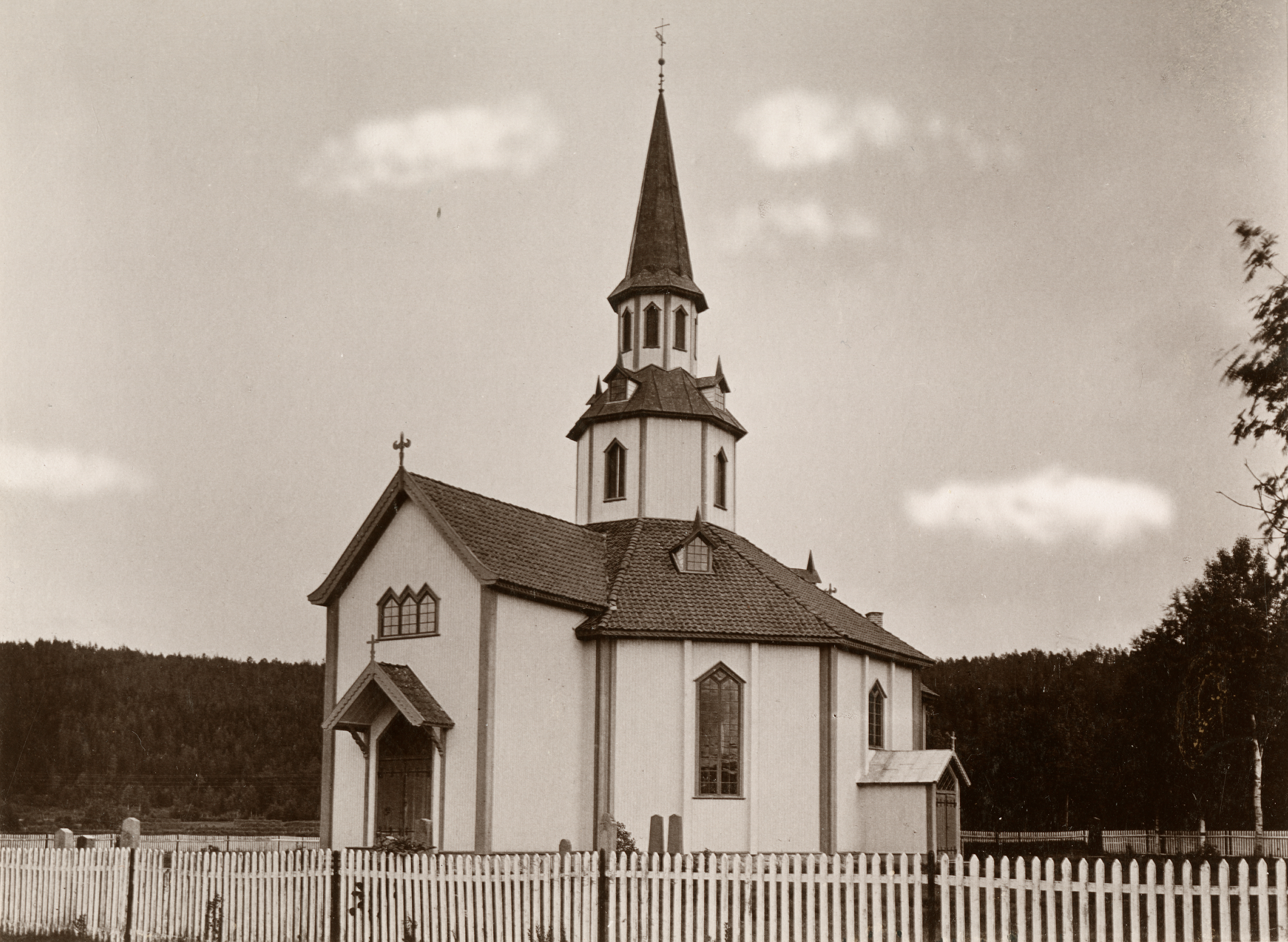
View of the church (c. 1900)

== See also ==
- List of churches in Hamar
