= Norwegian County Road 181 =

Road in Eastern Norway

Coordinates: 60°21′57″N 11°23′15″E

County Road 181
- Bokmål: Fylkesvei 181; Nynorsk: Fylkesveg 181

Route information
- Maintained by Norwegian Public Roads Administration
- Length: 26.4 km (16.4 mi)

Major junctions
- West end: E6 at Boksrud
- East end: Fv24 at Sand

Location
- Country: Norway

Highway system
- Roads in Norway; National Roads; County Roads

County Road 181 (Norwegian: Fylkesvei 181) is a two-lane highway in Akershus and Innlandet counties in Norway. The road runs between the European route E6 highway at Boksrud in Eidsvoll Municipality (in Akershus) and the Norwegian county road 24 at the village of Sand in Nord-Odal Municipality (in Innlandet). The road is 26.4 kilometers (16.4 mi) long, of which 16.9 kilometers (10.5 mi) is in Eidsvoll and 9.5 kilometers (5.9 mi) is in Nord-Odal.

Prior to 1 January 2010, the road was classified as a national road and it was called National Road 181 (Riksvei 181). On that date, it was reclassified to a county road. This was part of a transfer of most national roads in Norway from the responsibility of the national government to the local county municipalities.
