= Trøftskogen Chapel =

Church in Innlandet, Norway

- Trøftskogen kapell
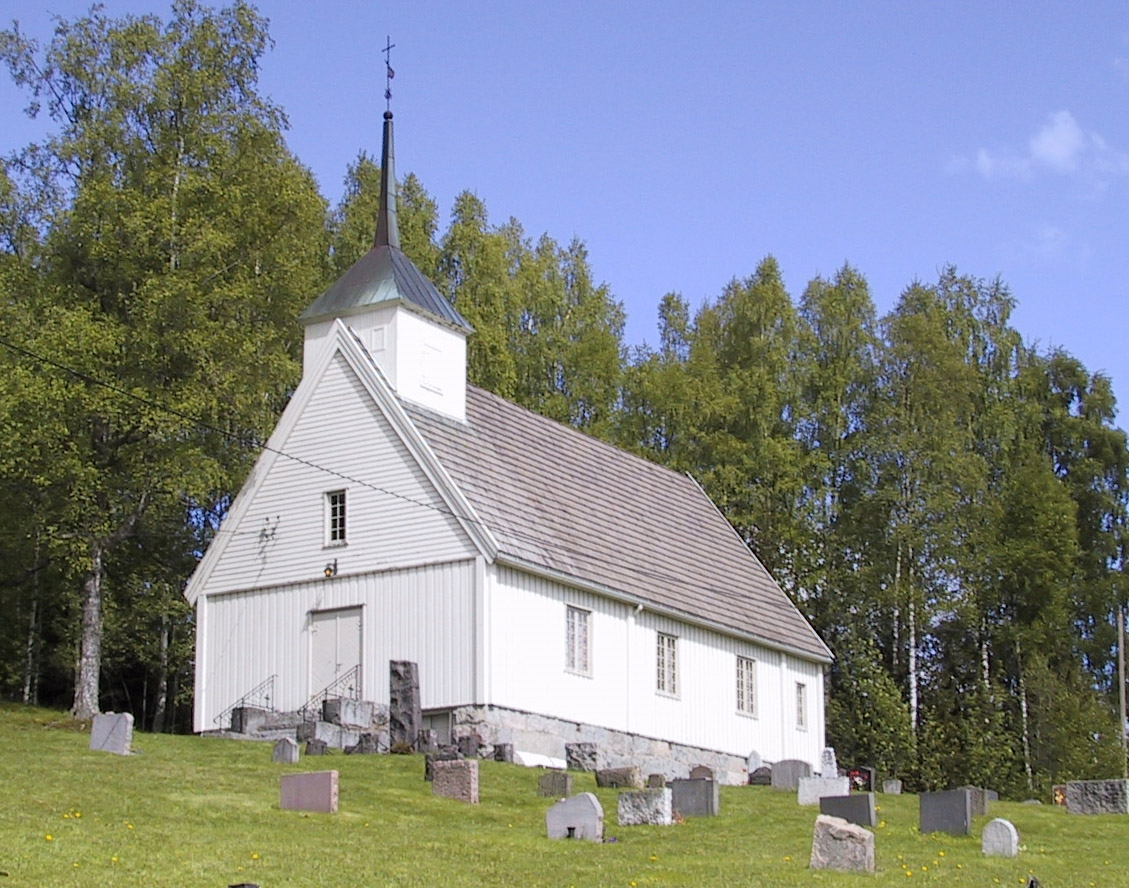
- View of the church
- Trøftskogen Chapel
- 60°30′07″N 11°22′58″E
- Location: Nord-Odal Municipality, Innlandet
- Country: Norway
- Denomination: Church of Norway
- Churchmanship: Evangelical Lutheran

History
- Status: Parish church
- Founded: 1931
- Consecrated: 11 October 1931

Architecture
- Functional status: Active
- Architect: Statens bygningsinspektør
- Architectural type: Long church
- Completed: 1931 (95 years ago)

Specifications
- Capacity: 80
- Materials: Wood

Administration
- Diocese: Hamar bispedømme
- Deanery: Solør, Vinger og Odal prosti
- Parish: Sand
- Norwegian Cultural Heritage Site
- Type: Church
- Status: Not protected
- ID: 85677

Trøftskogen Chapel (Norwegian: Trøftskogen kapell) is a parish church of the Church of Norway in Nord-Odal Municipality in Innlandet county, Norway. It is located in the village of Trautskogen. It is one of the two churches for the Sand parish which is part of the Solør, Vinger og Odal prosti (deanery) in the Diocese of Hamar. The white, wooden chapel was built in a long church design in 1931 using plans drawn up by the State building inspector's office (Norwegian: Statens bygningsinspektør). The chapel seats about 80 people.

== History ==
At first, there was a desire to have a separate hall at the local school for church use, but this never happened. Instead, fundraising and planning eventually led to the construction of a separate chapel at Trøftskogen (later named Trautskogen). In 1928, architectural drawings were received from the State building inspector's office (Norwegian: Statens bygningsinspektør) which were used for the new chapel. The local parishioners contributed materials and volunteer work to construct the building. It is a log building with a long church design. There is a sacristy on both sides of the choir. The new chapel was consecrated by the bishop on 11 October 1931. In 1952, the building was wired for electricity. It wasn't until 2009 that the chapel received smoke alarms.

== See also ==
- List of churches in Hamar
