= Nils T. Bjørke =

Norwegian politician (born 1959)

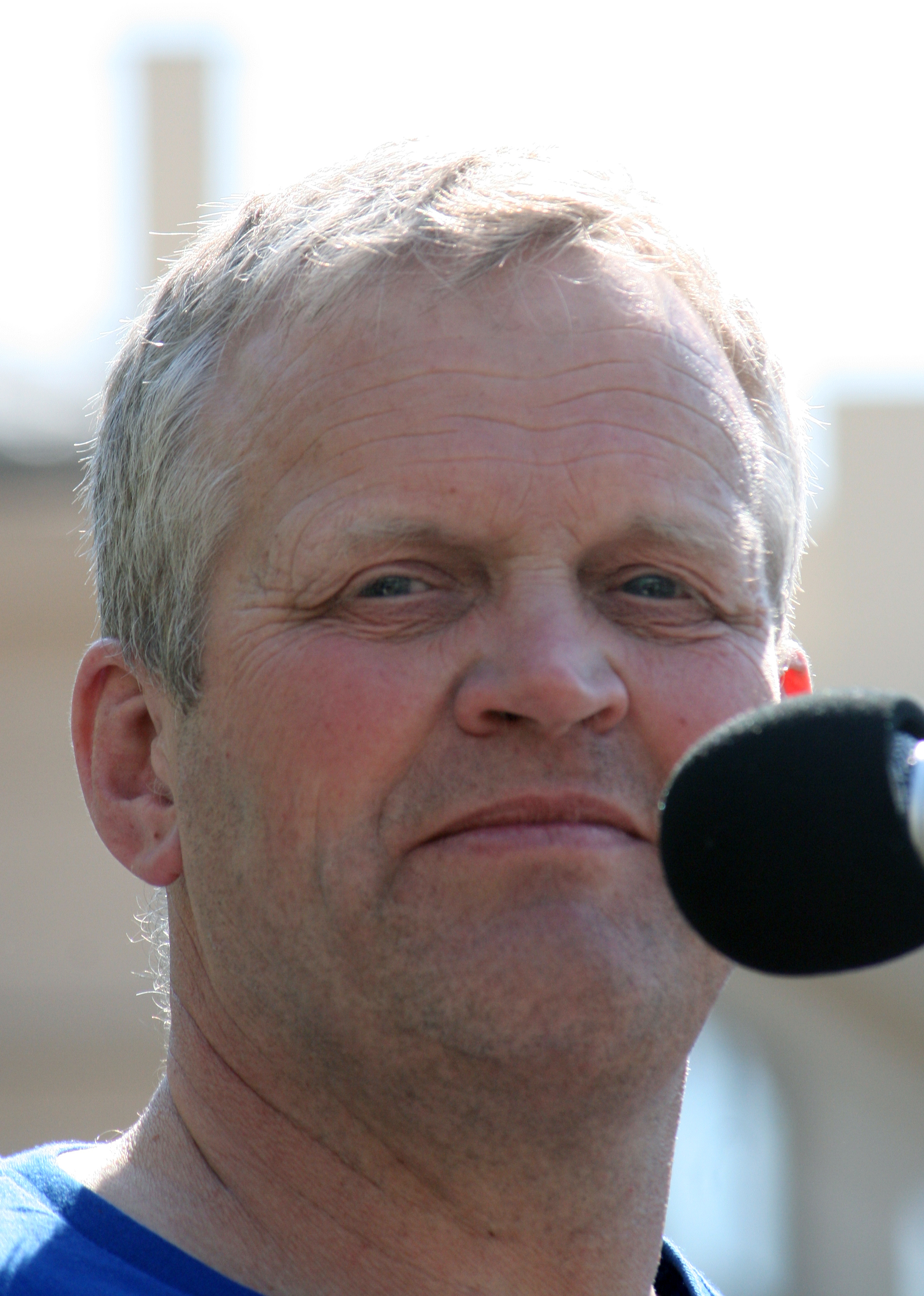
- Bjørke in 2014

Second Vice President of the Storting
- In office 9 October 2021 – 30 September 2025
- President: Eva Kristin Hansen; Masud Gharahkhani
- Preceded by: Morten Wold
- Succeeded by: Lise Selnes

Fourth Vice President of the Storting
- In office 7 October 2017 – 30 September 2021
- President: Olemic Thommessen; Tone W. Trøen
- Preceded by: Ingjerd Schou
- Succeeded by: Sverre Myrli

Member of the Storting
- In office 1 October 2017 – 30 September 2025
- Constituency: Hordaland

Personal details
- Born: 9 March 1959 (age 67) Voss Municipality, Hordaland, Norway
- Party: Centre
- Occupation: Politician

Nils T. Bjørke (born 9 March 1959) is a Norwegian farmer, organisational leader and politician. A former leader of the Norwegian Agrarian Association and member of the Centre Party, he served as a regular representative to the Storting for Hordaland from 2017 to 2025.

== Career ==
Born in Voss Municipality in 1959, Bjørke is running his own farm in Voss. From 2009 to 2014 he chaired the Norwegian Agrarian Association, having led the local chapter Hordaland Bondelag from 2000 to 2006.

He was elected representative to the Storting for the period 2017–2021 for the Centre Party, from the constituency of Hordaland. He served as the fourth vice president of the Storting from 2017 to 2021, as well as a member of the Standing Committee on Scrutiny and Constitutional Affairs. In October 2024, he was demoted on his local chapter's nomination list, which inevitably ensured that he wasn't re-elected at the 2025 election.

Following the 2021 election, he was appointed second Vice President of the Storting after Eva Kristin Hansen took over as president. Following the 2025 election, he was succeeded by Lise Selnes from the Labour Party.
