= Juliussen =

Juliussen is a Norwegian surname. Notable people with the surname include:

- Albert Juliussen (1920–1982), English footballer
- Anders Juliussen (born 1976), Norwegian footballer
- Lasse Juliussen (born 1986), Norwegian politician
