= Monthei Eriksen Haug =

Norwegian politician

Monthei Eriksen Haug (9 March 1861 – 9 June 1933) was a Norwegian politician for the Liberal Party.

He was born in Nordre Odalen Municipality. He served in the military and attended Sagatun folk high school before settling as a farmer. He was elected to the municipal council for Nordre Odalen Municipality in 1891, and served as mayor from 1895 to 1901. He was elected to the Norwegian Parliament in 1900, representing the constituency of Hedemarkens Amt, and was re-elected in 1904 and 1907. He had been a deputy representative during the term 1895–1897.
