= Sand Church (Innlandet) =

Church in Innlandet, Norway

- Sand kirke
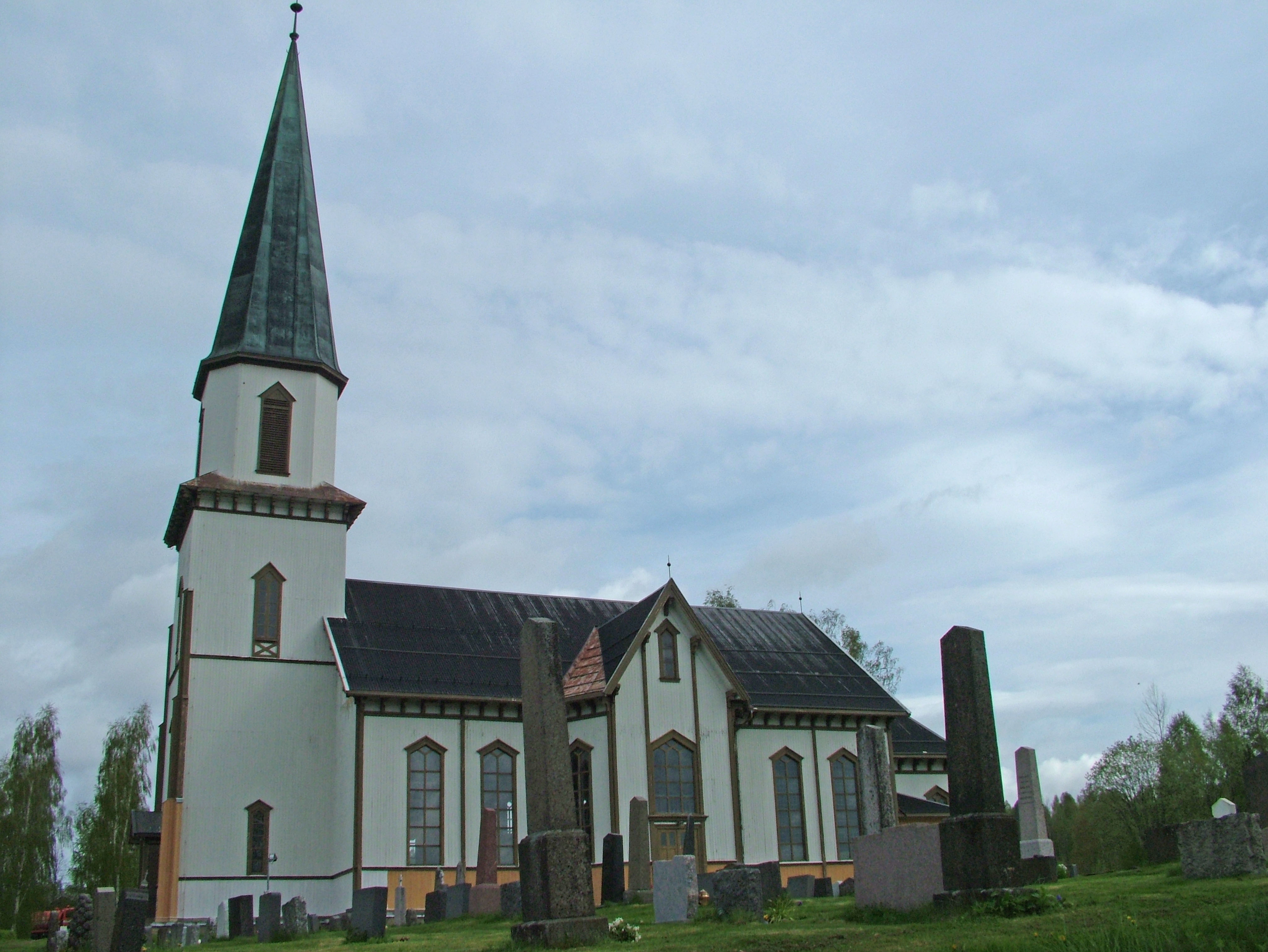
- View of the church
- Sand Church
- 60°23′24″N 11°32′38″E
- Location: Nord-Odal Municipality, Innlandet
- Country: Norway
- Denomination: Church of Norway
- Previous denomination: Catholic Church
- Churchmanship: Evangelical Lutheran

History
- Status: Parish church
- Founded: 1891
- Consecrated: 1891

Architecture
- Functional status: Active (Disputed)
- Architect: Günther Schüssler
- Architectural type: Long church
- Completed: 1891 (135 years ago)

Specifications
- Capacity: 525
- Materials: Wood

Administration
- Diocese: Hamar bispedømme
- Deanery: Solør, Vinger og Odal prosti
- Parish: Sand
- Norwegian Cultural Heritage Site
- Type: Church
- Status: Not protected
- ID: 85373

Sand Church (Norwegian: Sand kirke) is a parish church of the Church of Norway in Nord-Odal Municipality in Innlandet county, Norway. It is located in what was the village of Sand. It is one of the two churches for the Sand parish which is part of the Solør, Vinger og Odal prosti (deanery) in the Diocese of Hamar. The white, wooden church was built in a long church design in 1891 using plans drawn up by the architect Günther Schüssler. The church seats about 525 people.

== History ==
The earliest existing historical records of the church date back to the year 1394, but the church was not built that year. The first church was a wooden stave church that was likely built during the 13th century. This church was located about 700 metres (2,300 ft) to the northwest of the present church site. By the end of the 1500s, the church was said to be quite old and dilapidated and for a time, around 1594, the church was closed because of its poor condition. At some point during the 1600s, the old church was torn down and a new replacement church was built on a new site, about 700 metres (2,300 ft) to the southeast of the old church site. The new church was a timber-framed long church. It is possible that some parts of the old stave church were reused in this building.

In 1814, this church served as an election church (Norwegian: valgkirke). Together with more than 300 other parish churches across Norway, it was a polling station for elections to the 1814 Norwegian Constituent Assembly which wrote the Constitution of Norway. This was Norway's first national elections. Each church parish was a constituency that elected people called "electors" who later met together in each county to elect the representatives for the assembly that was to meet at Eidsvoll Manor later that year.

During the late-1800s, the church was deemed to be too small for the congregation and possibly in poor condition, so the parish decided to tear down the old church and replace it with a new church. The parish hired Günther Schüssler to design the new church and Karl Gunerius Christoffersen was hired as the lead builder. The church was built just north of the site of the old church. Construction took place in 1891. From the outside it may appear to be a cruciform church with very short transverse arms, but the furnishings are the same as for a long church. The church is made of wood and has a west tower above a church porch and the choir in the east is flanked by sacristies.

== Media gallery ==
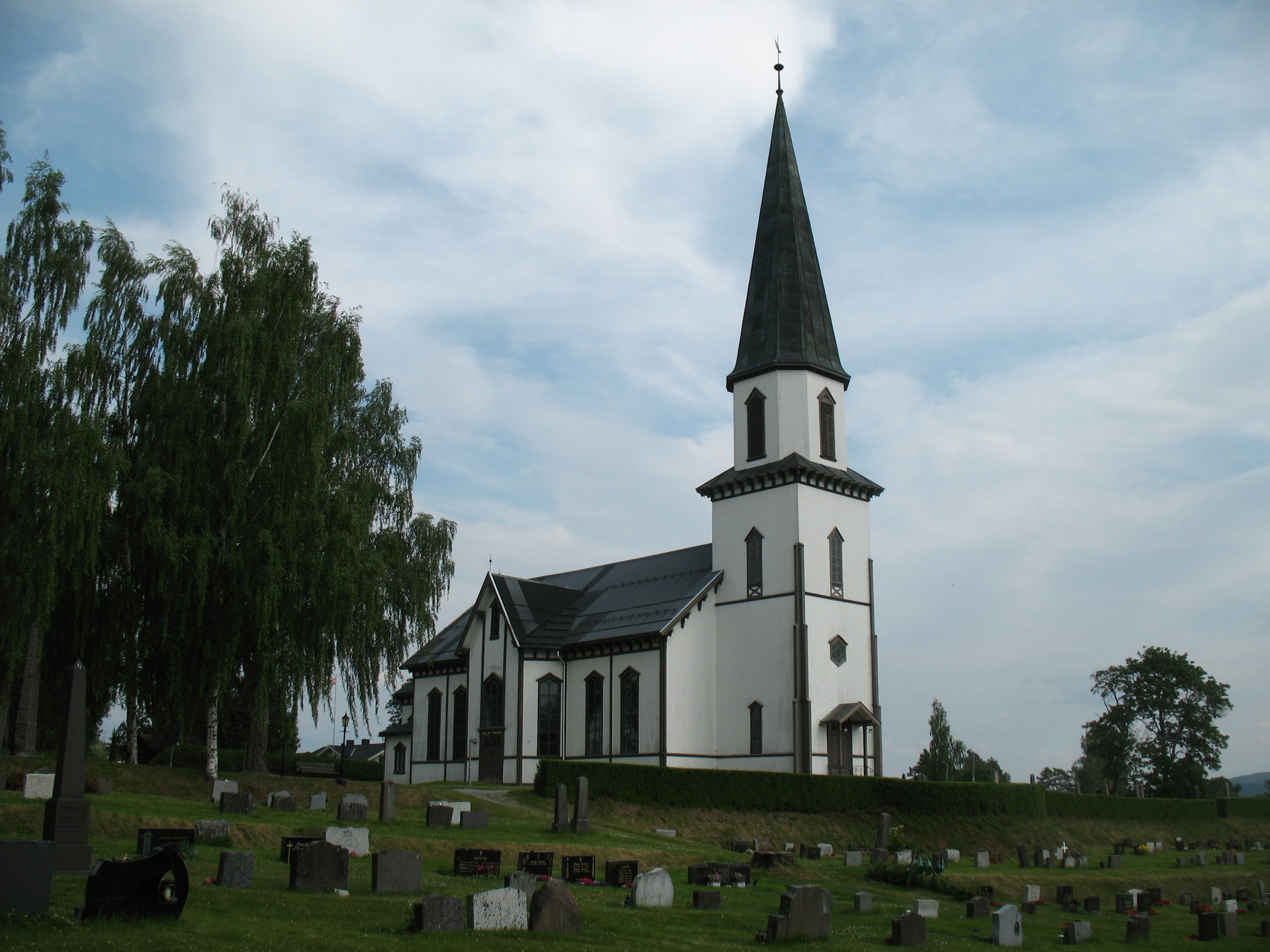
View from the northwest
Credit: AABK-Siri

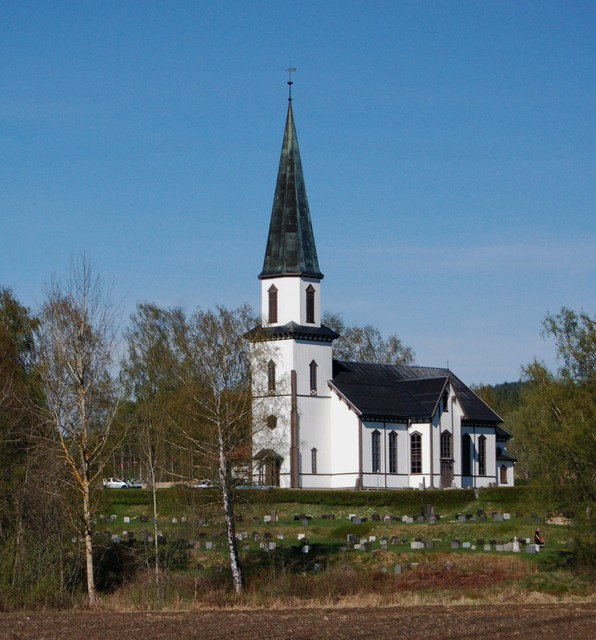
View from the southwest
Credit: www.kirkenorge.no

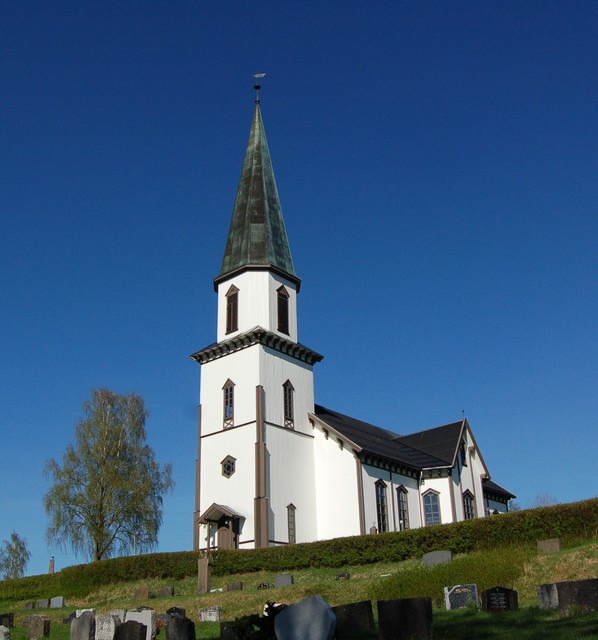
View from the southwest
Credit: www.kirkenorge.no

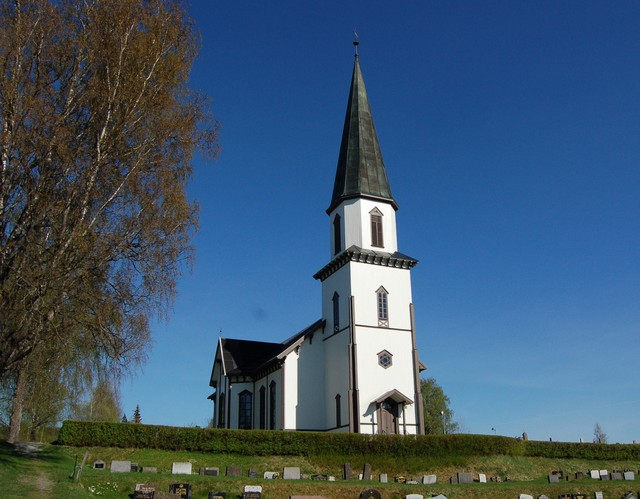
View from the northwest
Credit: www.kirkenorge.no

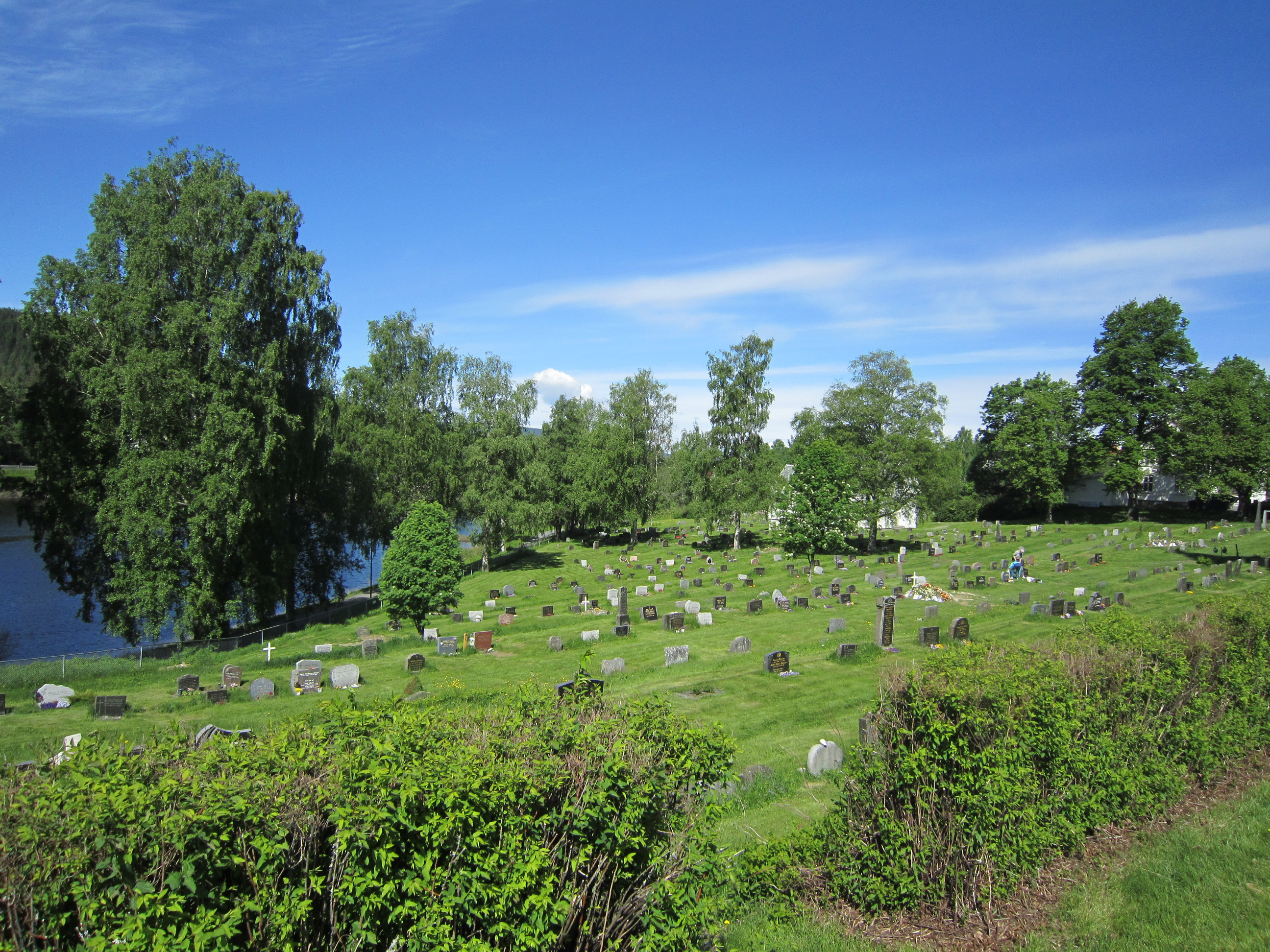
Graveyard
Credit: Jan-Tore Egge

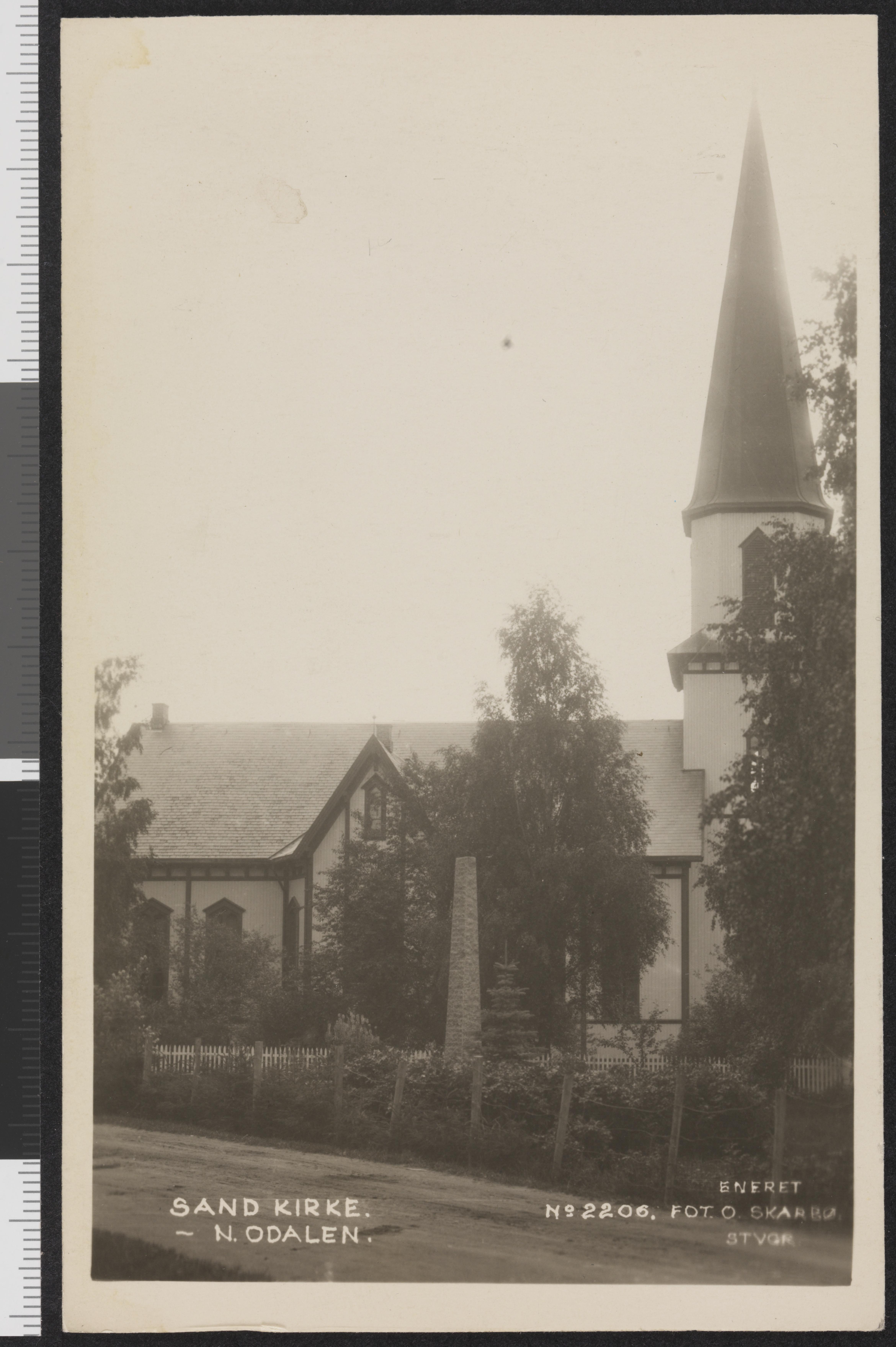
View of the church from circa 1920

== See also ==
- List of churches in Hamar
