= Günther Schüssler =

German-born architect and builder

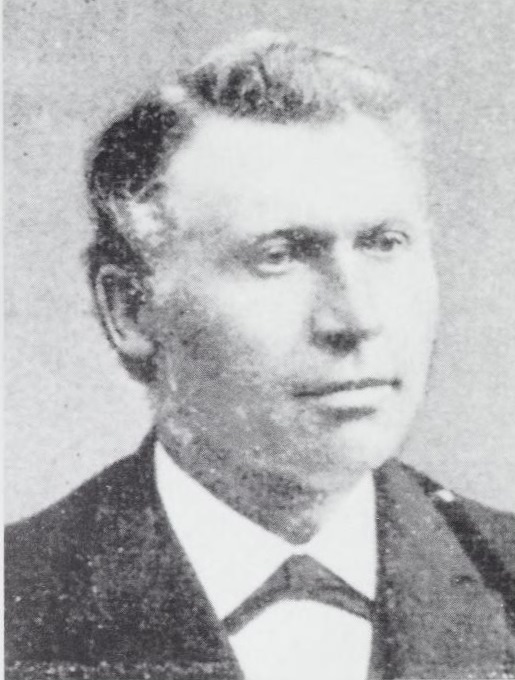
- Born: 13 November 1835; Schwarzburg-Rudolstadt, Germany
- Died: 25 September 1898 (aged 62); Kongsvinger, Norway
- Occupation: Architect

Johan Heinrich Günther Schüssler (1835–1898) was a German-born architect and builder who worked in Norway, primarily in the area from Kongsvinger to Lillehammer. Schüssler's work is characterized by neo-Gothic and Swiss chalet style. He is considered one of the earliest architects who brought the Swiss style to Norway. He is particularly known for his designs of many churches in eastern Norway.

Schüssler was born in Mehrstedt in Schwarzburg-Rudolstadt, Germany on 13 November 1835. He began at a young age with apprenticeships in northern Germany, Schleswig-Holstein and Denmark, as he trained as a carpenter, builder, and architect. He came to Norway around 1855 and he received Norwegian citizenship in 1857.

He worked his whole career in Eastern Norway building churches, railway stations, and other buildings. In 1898, he began to feel unwell and went to the doctor. He was diagnosed with stomach cancer, and he did not have many months to live. On 25 September 1898, he died in the middle of work on the Magnor customs station and the restoration of Vinger Church.

== Works ==
- Nordskogbygda Church
- Oppstad Church (restoration)
- Åsnes Church (restoration)
- Brandval Church (restoration)
- Arneberg Church
- Årnes Church
- Elverum Church (restoration)
- Eidsvoll Church
- Grue Finnskog Church
- Romedal Church
- Aurskog Church
- Fet Church
- Sand Church
- Vinger Church (restoration)
