= Odal, Norway =

Valley in Innlandet, Norway

Odal Odalen
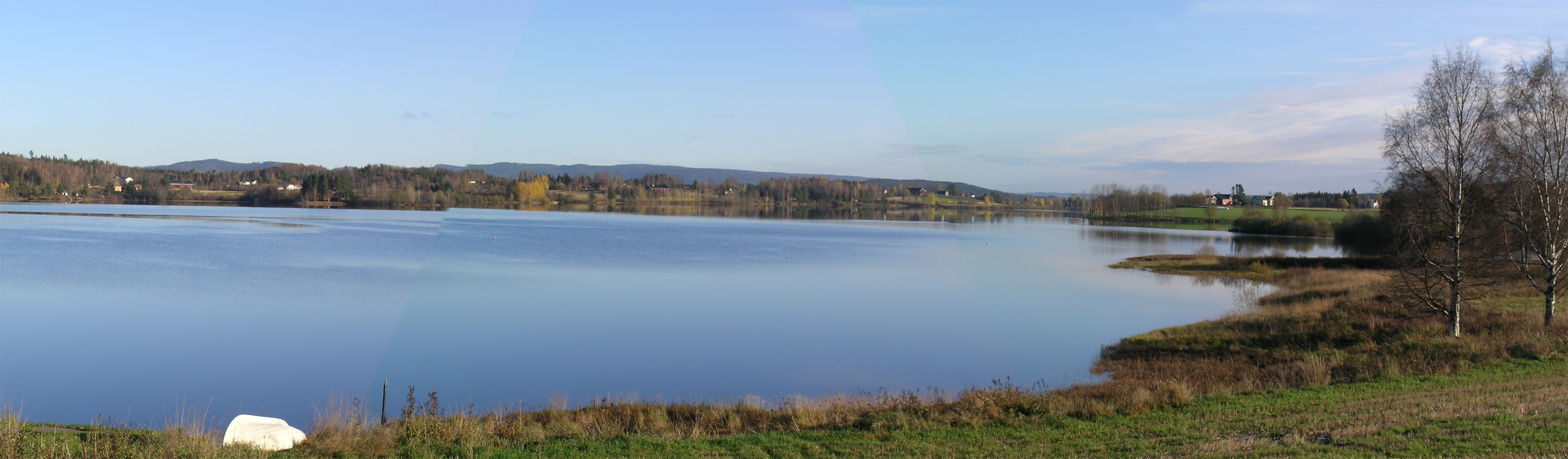
- View of the lake Storsjøen in northern Odal
- Area: 1,025 km^{2} (396 sq mi)

Geology
- Type: River valley

Geography
- Location: Innlandet, Norway
- Coordinates: 60.3295°N 11.6144°E
- River: Glomma

Location
- Interactive map of the valley

Odal or Odalen is a valley and traditional district in Innlandet county, Norway. The district encompasses the area around the lake Storsjøen in the north and to the areas around the river Glåma in the south. The district is currently divided between Sør-Odal Municipality and Nord-Odal Municipality. A person from Odalen is commonly called an odøling.

== Geography ==
The Glommadal (or Glåmdalen) valley is a designation for the valley formed by the river Glomma (or Glåma), which is the longest and largest river in Norway. From the lake Aursund in the north on southwards to Elverum, the valley is called the Østerdalen. From that point and further south until Kongsvinger, the valley is referred to as Solør. As the river turns and heads west from Kongsvinger all the way to the border with Nes Municipality, the valley is called the Odalen (Nes is part of the district of Romerike). These designations are traditional districts, reflecting the designations that the locals have historically used for their valleys.

== History ==
The name Odalen is derived from the Old Norse name Ódalr. The first part of the name comes from the Old Norse word Ó or À, which means 'river' (here referring to the Glomma river). The last element is dalr, which means 'valley' or 'dale'. The name can be documented to have been in use since 1386. Traces of human habitation dating back to the Nordic Bronze Age, between 1500 and 500 BCE. The first farms were probably cleared close to the lake about 500 BCE, in the early Iron Age. Settlement spread slowly around the lake and inland, and by the year 800, there may have been as many as 50 farms in the area. Settlement accelerated in the Viking Age, increasing the number of farms by as much as an order of magnitude. Increased mobility in the Norwegian population likely changed the character of the society in Odalen, and there is evidence the area was under the administration of the Thing in Eidsvoll.

When the region was Christianized around 1030, several churches were built, including locations at Oppstad, Strøm, Ulleren, Mo and Trøftskogen. The area became politically more autonomous. The valley may have become overpopulated until the Black Death and following plagues, when a huge proportion of the population died. Farms were abandoned and consolidated during this time, and it took at least 200 years for the population to reach its previous levels. During the 17th century, Odalen suffered economic setbacks as a result of taxation and general economic downturns. Forestry rose as a complementary source of income to agriculture. By all accounts, the agricultural sector has not grown appreciably in the area since the 18th century. Trautgruva iron ore mine was operated until 1830.

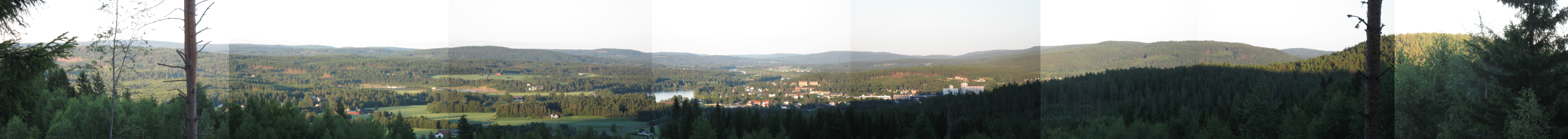
View of the Odalen area
