= Lasse Juliussen =

Norwegian politician

Lasse Juliussen (born 14 January 1986) is a Norwegian politician for the Labour Party.

He has served as an elected member of the municipal council for Nord-Odal Municipality and the Hedmark county council. In 2012 he entered the county cabinet in Hedmark as the youngest ever county cabinet member in Norway. In the 2009 and 2013 elections he was elected as a deputy representative to the Parliament of Norway from Hedmark.
