= Nord-Odal Municipality =

Municipality in Innlandet, Norway

Nord-Odal Municipality Nord-Odal kommune
- Municipality
- Nordre Odalen herred (historic name)
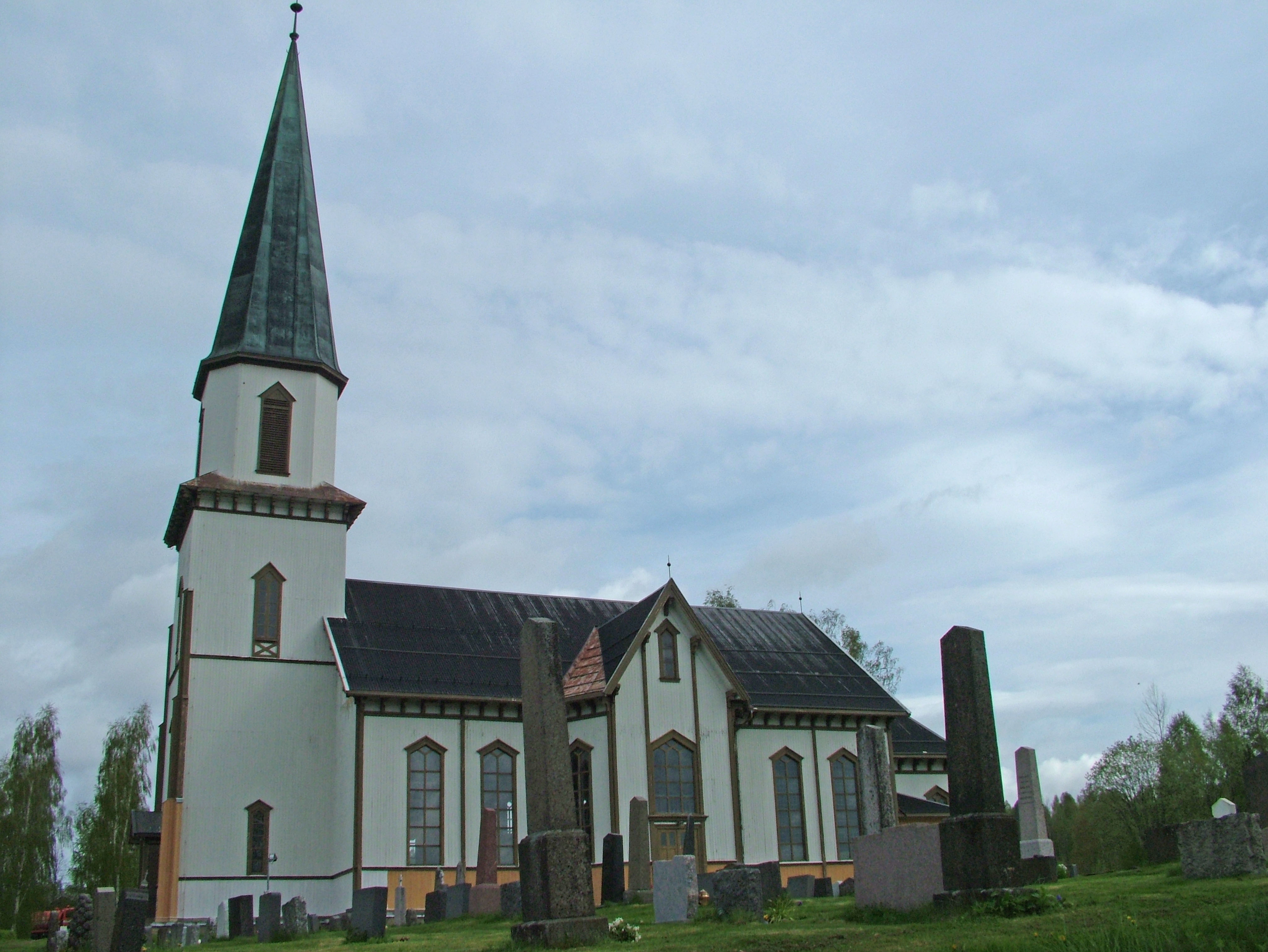
- View of the Sand Church in Nord-Odal

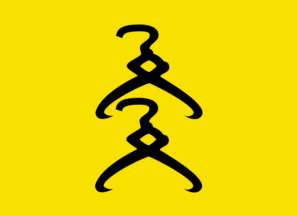
- Flag Coat of arms

- Innlandet within Norway

- Nord-Odal within Innlandet
- Coordinates: 60°26′32″N 11°34′5″E
- Country: Norway
- County: Innlandet
- District: Odalen
- Established: 1 Jan 1838
  - Created as: Formannskapsdistrikt
- Administrative centre: Sand

Government
  - Mayor (2023): Odd Kjetil Østvand-Sløtte (Ap)

Area
  - Total: 508.14 km^{2} (196.19 sq mi)
  - Land: 475.44 km^{2} (183.57 sq mi)
  - Water: 32.70 km^{2} (12.63 sq mi) 6.4%
  - Rank: #208 in Norway
- Highest elevation: 641.46 m (2,104.5 ft)

Population (2025)
  - Total: 5,006
  - Rank: #183 in Norway
  - Density: 9.9/km^{2} (26/sq mi)
  - Change (10 years): ▼ −2.5%
- Demonym: Nord-odøling

Official language
  - Norwegian form: Bokmål
- Time zone: UTC+01:00 (CET)
  - Summer (DST): UTC+02:00 (CEST)
- ISO 3166 code: NO-3414
- Website: Official website

Nord-Odal is a municipality in Innlandet county, Norway. It is located in the traditional district of Odalen. The administrative centre of the municipality is the village of Sand. Other villages in the municipality include Knapper and Mo.

The 508-square-kilometre (196 sq mi) municipality is the 208th largest by area out of the 357 municipalities in Norway. Nord-Odal Municipality is the 183rd most populous municipality in Norway with a population of 5,006. The municipality's population density is 9.9 inhabitants per square kilometre (26/sq mi) and its population has decreased by 2.5% over the previous 10-year period.

== General information ==
The parish of Nordre Odalen was established as a municipality on 1 January 1838 (see formannskapsdistrikt law). The borders of the municipality have not changed since that time (something that is relatively rare for Norwegian municipalities).

Historically, the municipality was part of the old Hedmark county. On 1 January 2020, the municipality became a part of the newly-formed Innlandet county (after Hedmark and Oppland counties were merged).

=== Name ===
The municipality was originally named Nordre Odalen (later Nord-Odal), after the valley in which it is located. The first element in the name is the word nordre or nord, both of which mean "northern". The last element of the name is the old district name Odalen (Old Norse: Ódalr). The first part of this is ǫ́ which is an alternate form of the word á which means "river" or "creek" (here it's referring to the Glåma river). The last part of this is dalr which means "valley" or "dale". The prefix "Nordre" was added when the old Odalen parish was divided in 1819 into Søndre Odalen in the south and Nordre Odalen in the north. On 3 November 1917, a royal resolution changed the spelling of the name of the municipality to Nord-Odal, using an alternate word for "north" and removing the definite form ending -en.

=== Coat of arms ===
The coat of arms was granted on 10 January 1992. The official blazon is "Or, two wood grapples sable in pale" (Norwegian: I gull to svarte tømmersakser, 1-1). This means the arms have a field (background) has a tincture of Or which means it is commonly colored yellow, but if it is made out of metal, then gold is used. The charge is two grapple tools lined up vertically. This design was chosen to represent the historic traditions of forestry and logging in the municipality. This kind of grapple was invented by a local boy named Nell Gravlie (1897-1980) when he was only 12 years old, the design was copyrighted in 1928. The arms were designed by Einar Skjervold. The municipal flag has the same design as the coat of arms.

=== Churches ===
The Church of Norway has two parishes (sokn) within Nord-Odal Municipality. It is part of the Solør, Vinger og Odal prosti (deanery) in the Diocese of Hamar.

Churches in Nord-Odal
Parish (sokn)	Church name	Location of the church	Year built
Mo	Mo Church	Mo	1864
Sand	Sand Church	Sand	1891
Sand	Trøftskogen Chapel	Trautskogen	1931

== Government ==
Nord-Odal Municipality is responsible for primary education (through 10th grade), outpatient health services, senior citizen services, welfare and other social services, zoning, economic development, and municipal roads and utilities. The municipality is governed by a municipal council of directly elected representatives. The mayor is indirectly elected by a vote of the municipal council. The municipality is under the jurisdiction of the Romerike og Glåmdal District Court and the Eidsivating Court of Appeal.

=== Mayors ===
The mayor (Norwegian: ordfører) of Nord-Odal Municipality is the political leader of the municipality and the chairperson of the municipal council. Here is a list of people who have held this position:

- 1838–1843: Carl Ernst Nørregaard
- 1843–1849: Amund Olsen Grønnerud
- 1849–1857: Torsten Pedersen Trøften
- 1857–1859: Anders Olsen Holth
- 1859–1861: Hans Larsen Stormoen
- 1861–1863: Torsten Pedersen Trøften
- 1863–1865: Anders Olsen Holth
- 1865–1867: Lars Syversen Oulie
- 1867–1871: Erik Monsen Haug
- 1871–1875: Erik Olsen Breiby
- 1875–1879: Anders Olsen Holth
- 1879–1881: Erik Monsen Haug
- 1881–1895: Peder Torstensen Trøften
- 1895–1901: Monthei Eriksen Haug (V)
- 1901–1903: Knut Eriksen Haug (V)
- 1903–1910: Arne Løfsgaard (V)
- 1910–1913: Ingebret O. Løberg (ArbDem)
- 1913–1919: Ole Rovelstadmoen (Ap)
- 1919–1925: Marius Midtsund (V)
- 1925–1939: Anders Sjøli (Ap)
- 1939–1941: Hans Carlsen (Ap)
- 1941–1945: Henry Aaby (NS)
- 1945–1945: Birger Jacobsen (NS)
- 1945–1945: Ole Bjørnstad (Ap)
- 1945–1946: Hans Carlsen (Ap)
- 1946–1956: Hans Gulbrandsen (Ap)
- 1956–1959: Tormod Ruud (Ap)
- 1960–1971: Johan Østli (Ap)
- 1971–1977: Einar Olav Skogholt (Ap)
- 1977–1979: Ronald Andersen (Ap)
- 1979–1987: Thorleiv Kårstad (Ap)
- 1987–1989: Egil Mangnes (Ap)
- 1990–2003: Egil Ringerike (Ap)
- 2003–2011: Asgeir Østli (Ap)
- 2011–2021: Lise Selnes (Ap)
- 2021–2023: Ragnhild Haagenrud Moen (Sp)
- 2023–present: Odd Kjetil Østvand-Sløtte (Ap)

=== Municipal council ===
The municipal council (Kommunestyre) of Nord-Odal Municipality is made up of 25 representatives that are elected to four year terms. The tables below show the current and historical composition of the council by political party.

Nord-Odal kommunestyre 2023–2027
Party name (in Norwegian)	Number of representatives
Labour Party (Arbeiderpartiet)	11
Progress Party (Fremskrittspartiet)	3
Conservative Party (Høyre)	3
Red Party (Rødt)	1
Centre Party (Senterpartiet)	4
Socialist Left Party (Sosialistisk Venstreparti)	3
Total number of members:	25

Nord-Odal kommunestyre 2019–2023
Party name (in Norwegian)	Number of representatives
Labour Party (Arbeiderpartiet)	10
Progress Party (Fremskrittspartiet)	2
Conservative Party (Høyre)	2
Centre Party (Senterpartiet)	9
Socialist Left Party (Sosialistisk Venstreparti)	2
Total number of members:	25

Nord-Odal kommunestyre 2015–2019
Party name (in Norwegian)	Number of representatives
Labour Party (Arbeiderpartiet)	15
Conservative Party (Høyre)	4
Centre Party (Senterpartiet)	4
Socialist Left Party (Sosialistisk Venstreparti)	2
Total number of members:	25

Nord-Odal kommunestyre 2011–2015
Party name (in Norwegian)	Number of representatives
Labour Party (Arbeiderpartiet)	14
Progress Party (Fremskrittspartiet)	4
Conservative Party (Høyre)	3
Centre Party (Senterpartiet)	2
Socialist Left Party (Sosialistisk Venstreparti)	1
Liberal Party (Venstre)	1
Total number of members:	25

Nord-Odal kommunestyre 2007–2011
Party name (in Norwegian)	Number of representatives
Labour Party (Arbeiderpartiet)	14
Progress Party (Fremskrittspartiet)	5
Centre Party (Senterpartiet)	2
Socialist Left Party (Sosialistisk Venstreparti)	1
Nord-Odal local list (Nord-Odal bygdeliste)	3
Total number of members:	25

Nord-Odal kommunestyre 2003–2007
Party name (in Norwegian)	Number of representatives
Labour Party (Arbeiderpartiet)	15
Progress Party (Fremskrittspartiet)	3
Centre Party (Senterpartiet)	2
Socialist Left Party (Sosialistisk Venstreparti)	2
Nord-Odal local list (Nord-Odal bygdeliste)	3
Total number of members:	25

Nord-Odal kommunestyre 1999–2003
Party name (in Norwegian)	Number of representatives
Labour Party (Arbeiderpartiet)	10
Progress Party (Fremskrittspartiet)	1
Centre Party (Senterpartiet)	3
Socialist Left Party (Sosialistisk Venstreparti)	3
Nord-Odal local list (Nord-Odal bygdeliste)	8
Total number of members:	25

Nord-Odal kommunestyre 1995–1999
Party name (in Norwegian)	Number of representatives
Labour Party (Arbeiderpartiet)	12
Centre Party (Senterpartiet)	3
Socialist Left Party (Sosialistisk Venstreparti)	3
Nord-Odal local list (Nord-Odal bygdeliste)	7
Total number of members:	25

Nord-Odal kommunestyre 1991–1995
Party name (in Norwegian)	Number of representatives
Labour Party (Arbeiderpartiet)	14
Conservative Party (Høyre)	1
Centre Party (Senterpartiet)	3
Socialist Left Party (Sosialistisk Venstreparti)	4
Nord-Odal local list (Nord-Odal bygdeliste)	3
Total number of members:	25

Nord-Odal kommunestyre 1987–1991
Party name (in Norwegian)	Number of representatives
Labour Party (Arbeiderpartiet)	19
Conservative Party (Høyre)	2
Centre Party (Senterpartiet)	2
Socialist Left Party (Sosialistisk Venstreparti)	2
Total number of members:	25

Nord-Odal kommunestyre 1983–1987
Party name (in Norwegian)	Number of representatives
Labour Party (Arbeiderpartiet)	20
Conservative Party (Høyre)	2
Centre Party (Senterpartiet)	1
Socialist Left Party (Sosialistisk Venstreparti)	2
Total number of members:	25

Nord-Odal kommunestyre 1979–1983
Party name (in Norwegian)	Number of representatives
Labour Party (Arbeiderpartiet)	18
Conservative Party (Høyre)	2
Christian Democratic Party (Kristelig Folkeparti)	1
Centre Party (Senterpartiet)	2
Socialist Left Party (Sosialistisk Venstreparti)	2
Total number of members:	25

Nord-Odal kommunestyre 1975–1979
Party name (in Norwegian)	Number of representatives
Labour Party (Arbeiderpartiet)	18
Christian Democratic Party (Kristelig Folkeparti)	1
Centre Party (Senterpartiet)	3
Socialist Left Party (Sosialistisk Venstreparti)	3
Total number of members:	25

Nord-Odal kommunestyre 1971–1975
Party name (in Norwegian)	Number of representatives
Labour Party (Arbeiderpartiet)	19
Centre Party (Senterpartiet)	2
Socialist common list (Venstresosialistiske felleslister)	4
Total number of members:	25

Nord-Odal kommunestyre 1967–1971
Party name (in Norwegian)	Number of representatives
Labour Party (Arbeiderpartiet)	19
Conservative Party (Høyre)	1
Communist Party (Kommunistiske Parti)	2
Centre Party (Senterpartiet)	2
Socialist People's Party (Sosialistisk Folkeparti)	1
Total number of members:	25

Nord-Odal kommunestyre 1963–1967
Party name (in Norwegian)	Number of representatives
Labour Party (Arbeiderpartiet)	18
Conservative Party (Høyre)	1
Communist Party (Kommunistiske Parti)	3
Christian Democratic Party (Kristelig Folkeparti)	1
Centre Party (Senterpartiet)	2
Total number of members:	25

Nord-Odal herredsstyre 1959–1963
Party name (in Norwegian)	Number of representatives
Labour Party (Arbeiderpartiet)	14
Communist Party (Kommunistiske Parti)	5
Christian Democratic Party (Kristelig Folkeparti)	2
Joint List(s) of Non-Socialist Parties (Borgerlige Felleslister)	3
Local List(s) (Lokale lister)	1
Total number of members:	25

Nord-Odal herredsstyre 1955–1959
Party name (in Norwegian)	Number of representatives
Labour Party (Arbeiderpartiet)	15
Communist Party (Kommunistiske Parti)	5
Christian Democratic Party (Kristelig Folkeparti)	1
Joint List(s) of Non-Socialist Parties (Borgerlige Felleslister)	3
Local List(s) (Lokale lister)	1
Total number of members:	25

Nord-Odal herredsstyre 1951–1955
Party name (in Norwegian)	Number of representatives
Labour Party (Arbeiderpartiet)	14
Communist Party (Kommunistiske Parti)	6
Christian Democratic Party (Kristelig Folkeparti)	1
Joint List(s) of Non-Socialist Parties (Borgerlige Felleslister)	3
Total number of members:	24

Nord-Odal herredsstyre 1947–1951
Party name (in Norwegian)	Number of representatives
Labour Party (Arbeiderpartiet)	13
Communist Party (Kommunistiske Parti)	8
Joint List(s) of Non-Socialist Parties (Borgerlige Felleslister)	3
Total number of members:	24

Nord-Odal herredsstyre 1945–1947
Party name (in Norwegian)	Number of representatives
Labour Party (Arbeiderpartiet)	13
Communist Party (Kommunistiske Parti)	9
Joint List(s) of Non-Socialist Parties (Borgerlige Felleslister)	2
Total number of members:	24

Nord-Odal herredsstyre 1937–1941*
Party name (in Norwegian)	Number of representatives
Labour Party (Arbeiderpartiet)	18
Communist Party (Kommunistiske Parti)	2
Joint list of the Conservative Party (Høyre) and the Farmers' Party (Bondepartiet)	2
Joint List(s) of Non-Socialist Parties (Borgerlige Felleslister)	2
Total number of members:	24
Note: Due to the German occupation of Norway during World War II, no elections were held for new municipal councils until after the war ended in 1945.

== Geography ==
Number of minorities (1st and 2nd generation) in Nord-Odal by country of origin in 2017
Ancestry	Number
Poland	42
Lithuania	30
Sweden	25
Thailand	16
Syria	15
Afghanistan	14
Denmark	13

Nord-Odal is situated in the Odalen valley around the northern edge of the lake Storsjøen and around the lake Råsån. The municipality is bordered to the north by Stange Municipality, to the east by Åsnes Municipality and Grue Municipality, to the south by Sør-Odal Municipality and Nes Municipality (in Akershus county), and to the west by Eidsvoll Municipality (also in Akershus county). The highest point in the municipality is the 641.46-metre (2,104.5 ft) tall mountain Årkjølen, on the northern border with Stange Municipality.

== Notable people ==
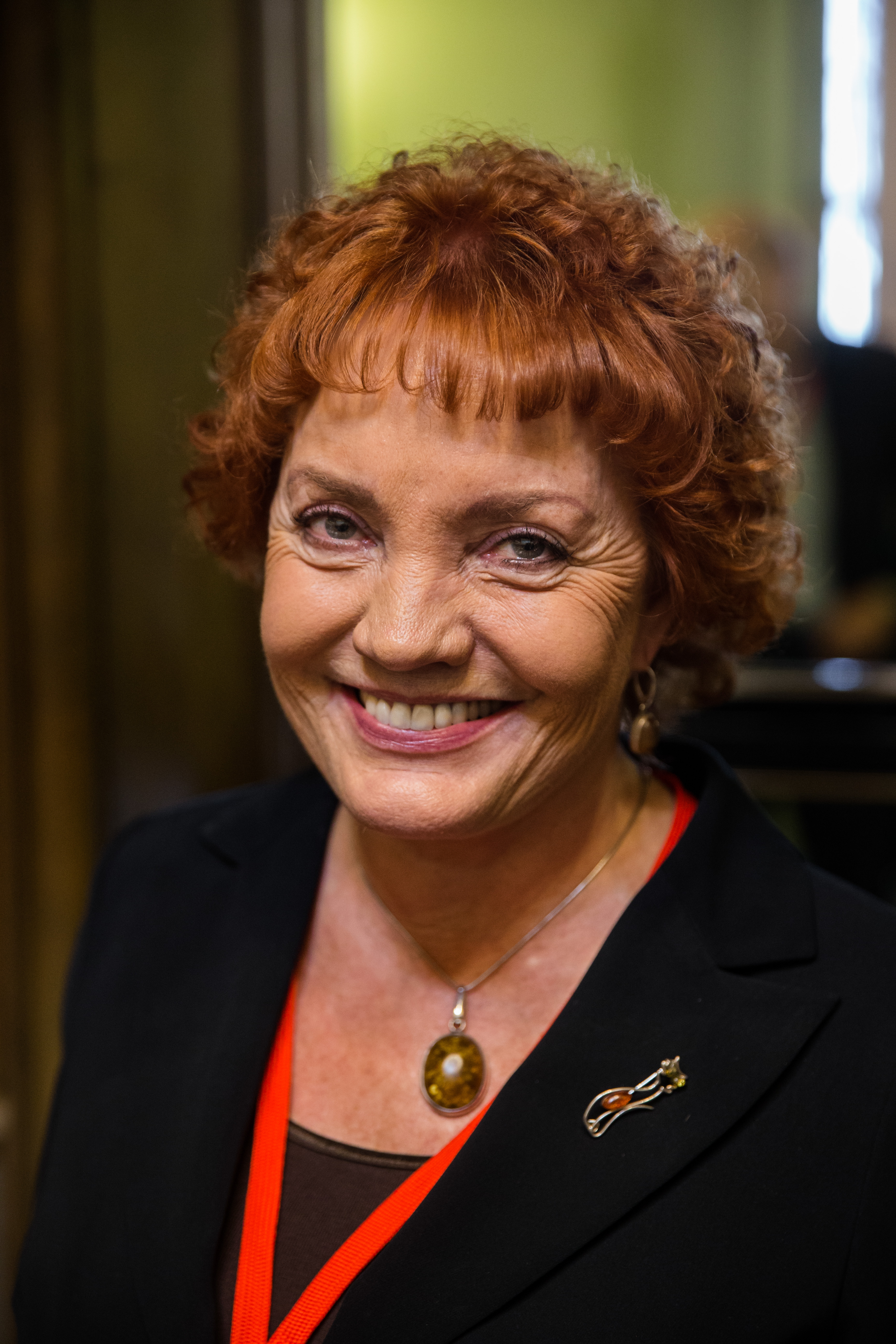
Marit Nybakk

- Honoratus Halling (1819 in Odalen – 1886), a priest, magazine editor and non-fiction writer
- Jon Hol (1851 at Ekornhol – 1941), an engineer and political activist
- Harald Stormoen (1872 in Nord-Odal – 1937), an actor
- Andreas Hofgaard Winsnes (1889 in Nord-Odal – 1972), a literary historian and educator
- Sigurd Hoel (1890 in Nord-Odal – 1960), an author and publishing consultant
- Marit Nybakk (born 1947 in Nord-Odal), a Norwegian politician of the Third Way
- Einar Olav Skogholt (born 1947 in Nord-Odal), a politician and Mayor of Nord-Odal in the 1970s
- Lasse Sætre (born 1974 in Sand), a former speed skater, bronze medallist at the 2002 Winter Olympics
- Jan Werner Danielsen (1976 in Nord-Odal – 2006), a pop singer
- Lise Selnes (born 1976), the mayor in Nord-Odal 2011–2021, and member of the Storting.

== Media gallery ==
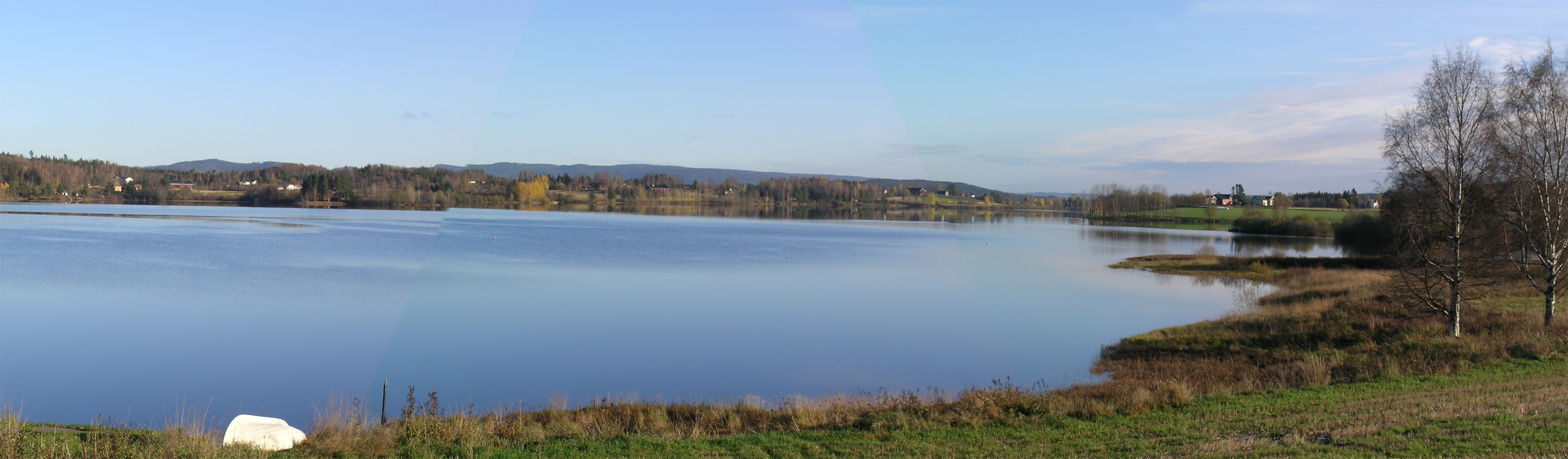
Part of Storsjøen, seen from Sand, Nord-Odal
