= Storsjøen (Odal) =

Lake in Odalen, Norway

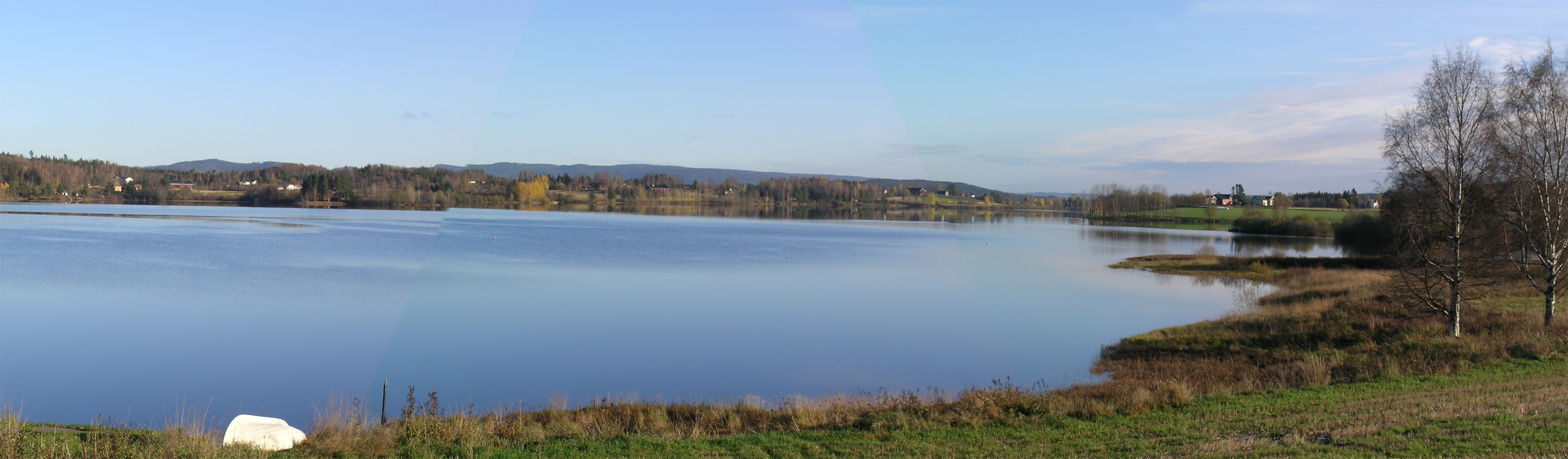
- Interactive map of the lake
- Location: Odalen, Innlandet
- Coordinates: 60°22′21″N 11°37′30″E
- Primary inflows: Solauståa and Austvassåa rivers
- Primary outflows: Oppstadåa river
- Basin countries: Norway
- Max. length: 15.8 kilometres (9.8 mi)
- Max. width: 7.2 kilometres (4.5 mi)
- Surface area: 42.763 km^{2} (16.511 sq mi)
- Average depth: 7 metres (23 ft)
- Max. depth: 17 metres (56 ft)
- Shore length^{1}: 105.45 kilometres (65.52 mi)
- Surface elevation: 129 metres (423 ft)
- References: NVE
- ^{1} Shore length is not a well-defined measure.

Storsjøen is a lake in the Odalen valley in Innlandet county, Norway. The 42.8-square-kilometre (16.5 sq mi) lake straddles the municipal boundary between Sør-Odal Municipality and Nord-Odal Municipality. The lake lies just south of the village of Sand (in Nord-Odal Municipality) and just north of the village of Skarnes (in Sør-Odal Municipality).

The lake flows out into the Oppstadåa river which flows about 8 kilometres (5.0 mi) to the south into the large Glomma river. When the river Glomma reaches high water levels, the river begins to flow into the lake Storsjøen. This phenomenon has given rise to the very special delta area at the southern end of the lake. This delta area has been protected as the Seimsjøen nature reserve.

The sea is rich in fish and an important stopover for waders and swimming birds. The lake is a popular tourist destination for many tourists.

== See also ==
- List of lakes in Norway
