= Toten Deanery =

Deanery in Church of Norway

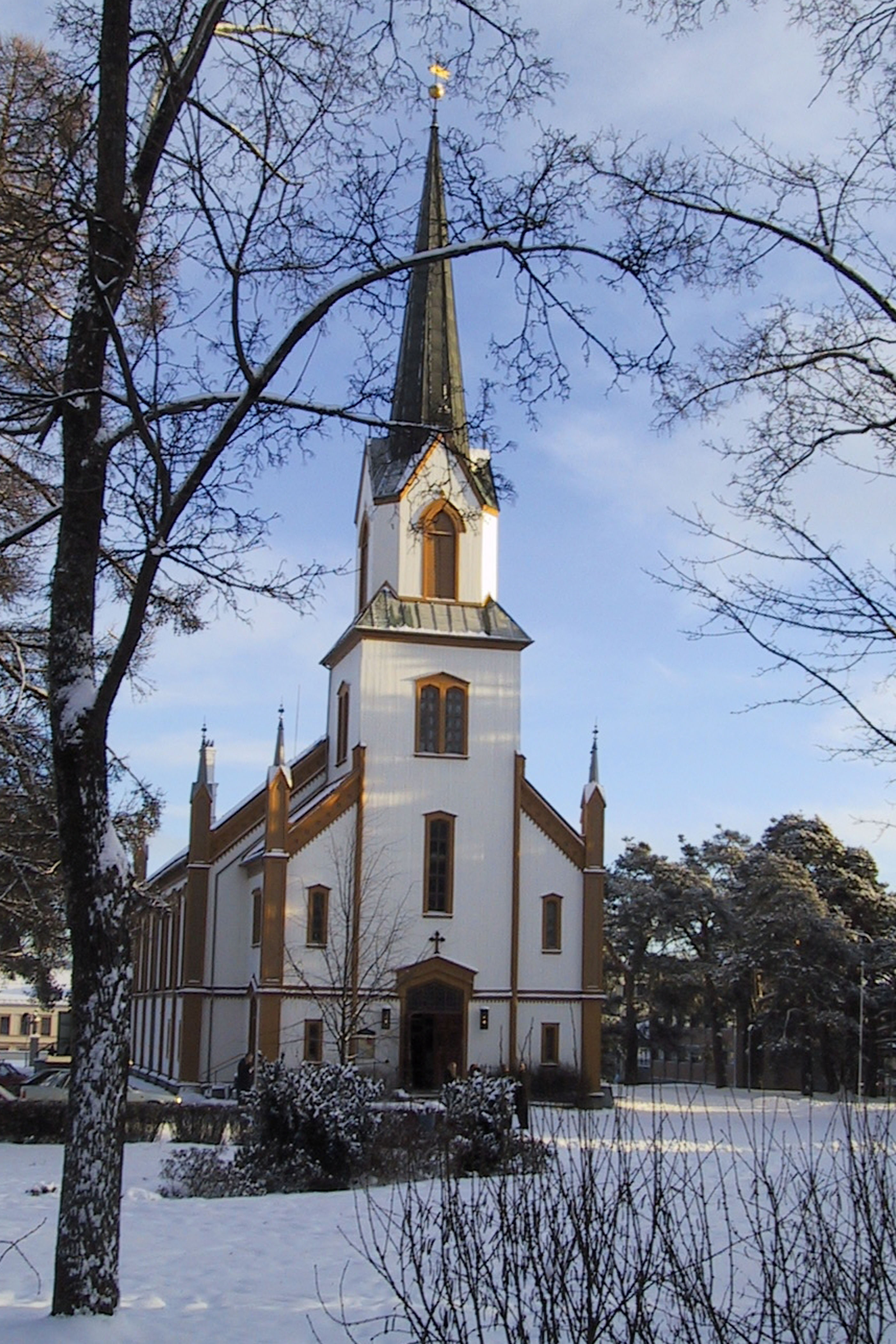
Gjøvik Church is the church where the deanery is based.

Toten Deanery (Norwegian: Toten prosti) is a deanery within the Diocese of Hamar in the Church of Norway. This deanery covers several municipalities in the southern part of the diocese. It includes churches in the municipalities of Gjøvik, Vestre Toten, and Østre Toten. The deanery is headquartered at Gjøvik Church in the town of Gjøvik in Gjøvik Municipality.

== History ==
In 1737, the Toten og Valdres prosti was established when the Hadeland, Ringerike og Toten prosti and Valdres og Hadeland prosti were reconfigured. The "Toten" and "Valdres" parts of the two deaneries were separated from the two larger deaneries to form a new deanery. The new Toten og Valdres prosti included the parishes of Biri, Vardal, Toten, Land, Aurdal, Slidre, and Vang. In 1805, Aurdal was divided into Søndre Aurdal and Nordre Aurdal. From 1814-1816, the deanery was divided into two parts: Toten og Land prosti and Valdres prosti, but this was short-lived and in 1816, they were merged together again. In 1825, Toten was divided into Østre Toten and Vestre Toten and the Feiring area simultaneously transferred to Hurdal. In 1847, Land Municipality was divided into Søndre Land Municipality and Nordre Land Municipality. In 1848, Slidre Municipality was divided into Vestre Slidre Municipality and Øystre Slidre Municipality.

By a royal resolution on 30 November 1852, the deanery was divided into two: Valdres prosti (including all of Valdres and Land) and Toten prosti. The new Toten prosti included the municipalities of Biri, Vardal, Østre Toten, Vestre Toten, Gausdal, and Fåberg. On 1 May 1871, Gausdal Municipality was transferred from Toten prosti to Søndre Gudbrandsdalen prosti. On 1 January 1902, the parish of Fåberg (Fåberg Municipality and the town of Lillehammer) was transferred to the Sør-Gudbrandsdal prosti.

== Locations ==
Map of the deanery within Innlandet county

Each municipality is made up of one or more church parishes. Each municipality elects a church council to oversee the churches within the municipality.

Municipalities	Churches
Gjøvik	Biri Church, Bråstad Church, Engehaugen Church, Gjøvik Church, Hunn Church, Nykirke, Seegård Church, Vardal Church
Østre Toten	Balke Church, Hoff Church, Kapp Church, Kolbu Church, Nordlien Church, Totenviken Church
Vestre Toten	Eina Church, Raufoss Church, Ås Church

== See also ==
- List of churches in Hamar § Toten prosti
