= Snertingdal Municipality =

Former municipality in Oppland, Norway

Snertingdal Municipality Snertingdal herred
- Former municipality
- Snertingdalen herred (historic name)
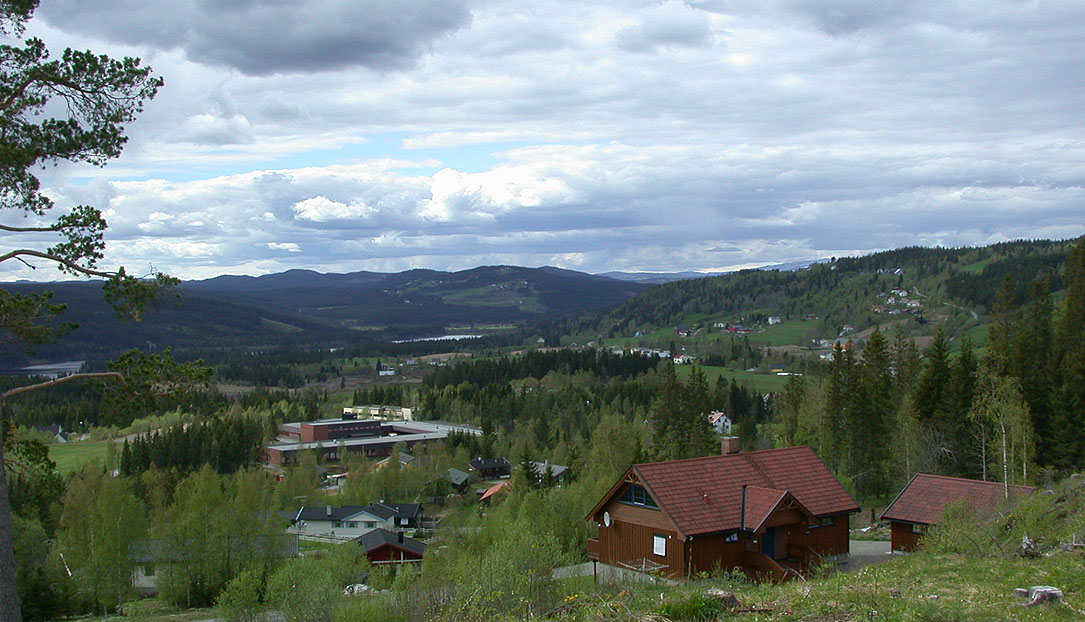
- View of the Snertingdal valley

- Oppland within Norway

- Snertingdal within Oppland
- Coordinates: 60°54′56″N 10°44′25″E
- Country: Norway
- County: Oppland
- District: Vestoppland
- Established: 1 Jan 1910
  - Preceded by: Biri Municipality
- Disestablished: 1 Jan 1964
  - Succeeded by: Gjøvik Municipality
- Administrative centre: Seegård

Government
  - Mayor (1945-1963): Anders Tandberg (Ap)

Area (upon dissolution)
  - Total: 219.7 km^{2} (84.8 sq mi)
  - Rank: #351 in Norway
- Highest elevation: 837.64 m (2,748.2 ft)

Population (1963)
  - Total: 2,491
  - Rank: #367 in Norway
  - Density: 11.3/km^{2} (29/sq mi)
  - Change (10 years): ▼ −3.9%
- Demonym: Snertingdøl

Official language
  - Norwegian form: Bokmål
- Time zone: UTC+01:00 (CET)
  - Summer (DST): UTC+02:00 (CEST)
- ISO 3166 code: NO-0526

Snertingdal is a former municipality in the old Oppland county, Norway. The 220-square-kilometre (85 sq mi) municipality existed from 1910 until its dissolution in 1964. The area is now part of Gjøvik Municipality in the traditional district of Vestoppland. The administrative centre was the village of Seegård. Other villages in the municipality included Ålset, Snertingdal, and Audenstad.

Prior to its dissolution in 1964, the 219.7-square-kilometre (84.8 sq mi) municipality was the 351st largest by area out of the 689 municipalities in Norway. Snertingdal Municipality was the 367th most populous municipality in Norway with a population of about 2,491. The municipality's population density was 11.3 inhabitants per square kilometre (29/sq mi) and its population had decreased by 3.9% over the previous 10-year period.

== General information ==
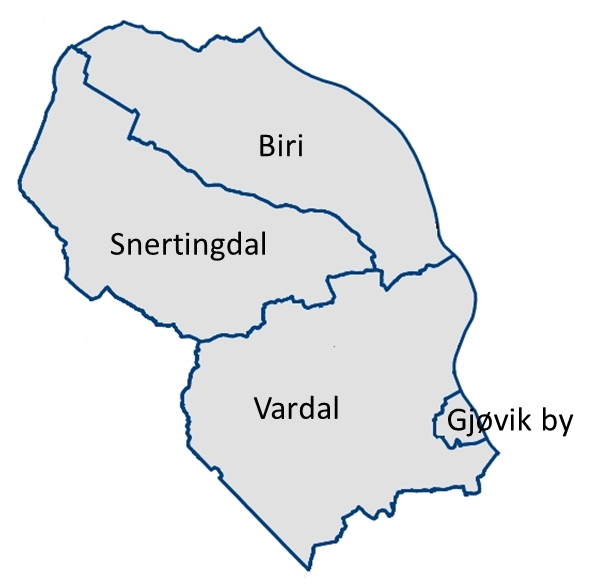
Map of the Snertingdal area before 1964

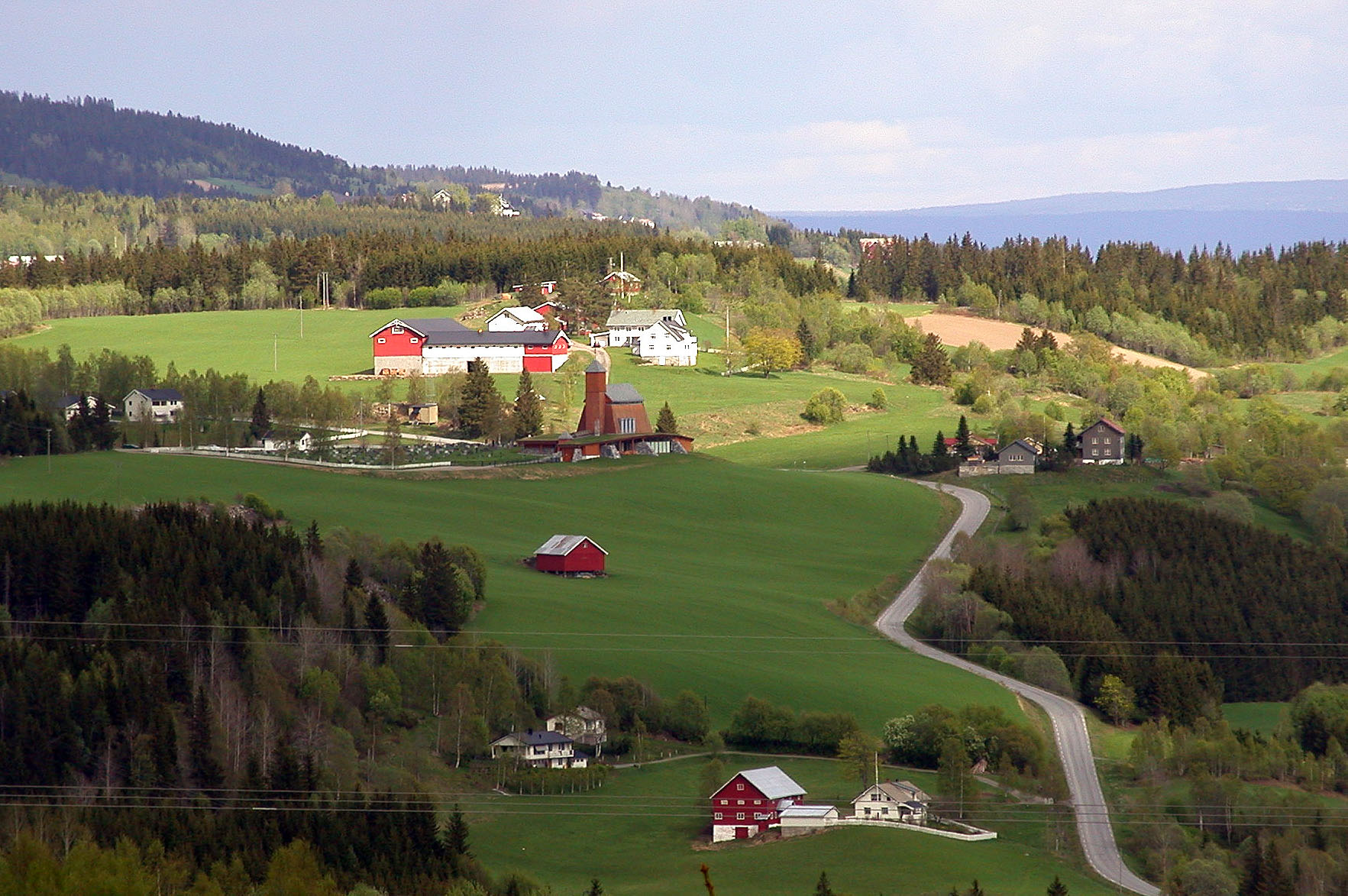
The area around Segaard, Snertingdal's main church

Snertingdal Municipality was established on 1 January 1910 when the large Biri Municipality was divided in two. The western part (population: 2,028) became Snertingdal Municipality and the eastern part (population: 2,815) continued as a smaller Biri Municipality.

During the 1960s, there were many municipal mergers across Norway due to the work of the Schei Committee. On 1 January 1964, the following areas were merged to form a new, larger Gjøvik Municipality with 23,608 residents:

- the town of Gjøvik (population: 8,251)
- Biri Municipality (population: 3,274)
- Snertingdal Municipality (population: 2,471)
- most of Vardal Municipality (population: (9,612)

=== Name ===
The municipality is named after the Snertingdalen valley (Old Norse: Snartheimsdalr) which runs through the municipality. The first element of the valley name is Snartheimr which comes from the old "Snartum" farm and church site in the valley. The farm name is likely derived from an old river name with the suffix heimr which means "home". The last element of the valley name is dalr which means "valley" or "dale".

Historically, the name of the municipality was spelled Snertingdalen. On 3 November 1917, a royal resolution changed the spelling of the name of the municipality to Snertingdal, removing the definite form ending -en.

=== Churches ===
The Church of Norway had one parish (sokn) within Snertingdal Municipality. At the time of the municipal dissolution, it was part of the Biri prestegjeld and the Toten prosti (deanery) in the Diocese of Hamar.

Churches in Snertingdal Municipality
Parish (sokn)	Church name	Location of the church	Year built
Snertingdal	Seegård Church	Seegård	1782*
Snertingdal	Nykirke (New Church)	Ålset	1872
*Note - this church burned down and was rebuilt in 1994.

== Geography ==
Snertingdal Municipality encompassed the Snertingdalen valley, east of the large lake Mjøsa. Fåberg Municipality was located to the north, Biri Municipality was located to the east, Vardal Municipality was located to the south, Fluberg Municipality was located to the southwest, Nordre Land Municipality was located to the west, and Torpa Municipality was located to the northwest. The highest point in the municipality was the 837.64-metre (2,748.2 ft) tall mountain Ringsrudåsen, located along the border with Torpa Municipality.

== Government ==
While it existed, Snertingdal Municipality was responsible for primary education (through 10th grade), outpatient health services, senior citizen services, welfare and other social services, zoning, economic development, and municipal roads and utilities. The municipality was governed by a municipal council of directly elected representatives. The mayor was indirectly elected by a vote of the municipal council. The municipality was under the jurisdiction of the Eidsivating Court of Appeal.

=== Municipal council ===
The municipal council (Herredsstyre) of Snertingdal Municipality was made up of 17 representatives that were elected to four year terms. The tables below show the historical composition of the council by political party.

Snertingdal herredsstyre 1959–1963
Party name (in Norwegian)	Number of representatives
Labour Party (Arbeiderpartiet)	10
Centre Party (Senterpartiet)	5
Liberal Party (Venstre)	2
Total number of members:	17
Note: On 1 January 1964, Snertingdal Municipality became part of Gjøvik Municipality.

Snertingdal herredsstyre 1955–1959
Party name (in Norwegian)	Number of representatives
Labour Party (Arbeiderpartiet)	9
Farmers' Party (Bondepartiet)	5
Liberal Party (Venstre)	3
Total number of members:	17

Snertingdal herredsstyre 1951–1955
Party name (in Norwegian)	Number of representatives
Labour Party (Arbeiderpartiet)	9
Farmers' Party (Bondepartiet)	4
Liberal Party (Venstre)	3
Total number of members:	16

Snertingdal herredsstyre 1947–1951
Party name (in Norwegian)	Number of representatives
Labour Party (Arbeiderpartiet)	8
Farmers' Party (Bondepartiet)	4
Joint list of the Liberal Party (Venstre) and the Radical People's Party (Radikale Folkepartiet)	4
Total number of members:	16

Snertingdal herredsstyre 1945–1947
Party name (in Norwegian)	Number of representatives
Labour Party (Arbeiderpartiet)	8
Farmers' Party (Bondepartiet)	3
Joint list of the Liberal Party (Venstre) and the Radical People's Party (Radikale Folkepartiet)	5
Total number of members:	16

Snertingdal herredsstyre 1937–1941*
Party name (in Norwegian)	Number of representatives
Labour Party (Arbeiderpartiet)	8
Farmers' Party (Bondepartiet)	5
Joint list of the Liberal Party (Venstre) and the Radical People's Party (Radikale Folkepartiet)	3
Total number of members:	16
Note: Due to the German occupation of Norway during World War II, no elections were held for new municipal councils until after the war ended in 1945.

=== Mayors ===
The mayor (Norwegian: ordfører) of Snertingdal Municipality was the political leader of the municipality and the chairperson of the municipal council. The following people have held this position:

- 1910–1911: Kristian Oudenstad
- 1911–1913: Kristian Markeng
- 1914–1916: Kristian Oudenstad
- 1917–1928: Anton E. Haugen (AD)
- 1929–1931: Johannes Kirkerud (Bp)
- 1932–1938: Lars Ødegårdstuen (RF)
- 1938–1940: Anders Tandberg (Ap)
- 1941–1945: Arne Fladsrud (NS)
- 1945–1963: Anders Tandberg (Ap)

== See also ==
- List of former municipalities of Norway
