= Niels Ødegaard =

Norwegian politician

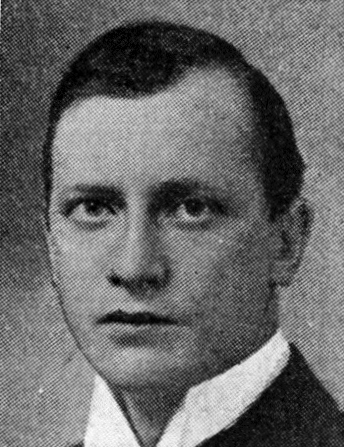
- Niels Ødegaard (1892–1976)
- Born: September 25, 1892; Gjøvik, Norway
- Died: 1976 (aged 83–84)
- Occupations: Educator, newspaper editor, politician
- Known for: Longest-serving mayor in Norwegian history

Niels Ødegaard (25 September 1892 – 1976) was a Norwegian educator, newspaper editor and politician for the Labour and Communist parties.

He was born in Gjøvik as a son of shoemaker Anton Ødegaard (1865–1931) and his wife Pauline Josefine Nielsen (1863–1943). He started his working career in a printing press from 1906 to 1909 and then as an office clerk for O. Mustad & Søn from 1909 to 1911. He then studied and graduated from Elverum Teachers' College in 1913, and was hired as a school teacher in Gjøvik. He also worked as a substitute teacher in Tyldalen, Fluberg, and Vardal. From 1916 he chaired the local Labour Party chapter. In 1919 he became editor-in-chief of the newspaper Ny Dag, He was also a member of the municipal council of Gjøvik Municipality from 1919, and served as mayor from 1922 to 1940. He left Ny Dag in 1924, and from 1926 to 1940 he was the editor-in-chief of Opland Arbeiderblad.

He also chaired Gjøvik's school board, and was deputy chair of the supervisory council of Kommunenes Filmcentral and Norsk Film. He chaired several local companies: Gjøvik Støperi og Mekaniske Verksted, Gjøvik Skifabrik, Gjøvik Auto and Byggeleverandøren, and was a board member of Gumælius og Reklame and Gjøvik Bruk, as well as the Federation of Norwegian Industries.

He was a deputy representative to the Parliament of Norway in the terms 1925–1927, 1928–1930 and 1931–1933, representing the Market towns of Hedmark and Oppland counties. In 1924 he was elected on the ballot of the Communist Party (which he had joined), but right after the election he gave up this party and rejoined the Labour Party. He returned as local Labour chairman, serving until 1934. He was elected as a full member of Parliament in 1933 and 1936. His last term was ended by the occupation of Norway by Nazi Germany, during which he was also removed as mayor. He instead became manager of the company Hunton Bruk, where he remained until 1961. He returned as mayor after the Second World War, and sat from 1945 to 1967. In total, he is the longest-sitting mayor in any Norwegian municipality. He also spearheaded policies, branded "Ødegaardianism", that bore the characteristics of a mixed economy (i.e. not really socialism).

In 1967 he was proclaimed an honorary citizen of Gjøvik, and in 1972 a monument to him was unveiled in the city. He died in 1976.
