= Skattum =

Skattum is a Norwegian surname. Notable people with the surname include:

- Dan Skattum, American politician
- Haagen Skattum (1824–1900), Norwegian businessman and politician
- Ole Jacob Skattum (1862–1930), Norwegian geographer, educator, and politician
