= Bybrua, Innlandet =

Village in Gjøvik Municipality, Norway

Bybrua
- Village
- Interactive map of Bybrua
- Location within Innlandet Location within Norway
- Coordinates: 60.80275°N 10.58073°E
- Country: Norway
- Region: Eastern Norway
- County: Innlandet
- District: Vestoppland
- Municipality: Gjøvik Municipality

Area
  - Total: 0.93 km^{2} (0.36 sq mi)
- Elevation: 280 m (920 ft)

Population (2024)
  - Total: 1,082
  - Density: 1,163/km^{2} (3,010/sq mi)
- Time zone: UTC+01:00 (CET)
  - Summer (DST): UTC+02:00 (CEST)
- Post Code: 2822 Bybrua

Bybrua is a village in Gjøvik Municipality in Innlandet county, Norway. The village is located about 7 kilometres (4.3 mi) to the west of the town of Gjøvik.

The 0.93-square-kilometre (230-acre) village has a population (2024) of 1,082 and a population density of 1,163 inhabitants per square kilometre (3,010/sq mi).

Bybrua is primarily a residential area that has become a suburb of the town of Gjøvik. There is a local school, grocery store with postal functions, and a daycare centre. The village area grew up around the main county highway leading west from the town.
