= Bybrua =

Bybrua (Norwegian, 'town bridge') may refer to:

- Stavanger City Bridge, a bridge in Rogaland county, Norway
- Bybrua, Innlandet, a village in Norway
