= Snertingdal (village) =

Village in Gjøvik Municipality, Norway

- Village
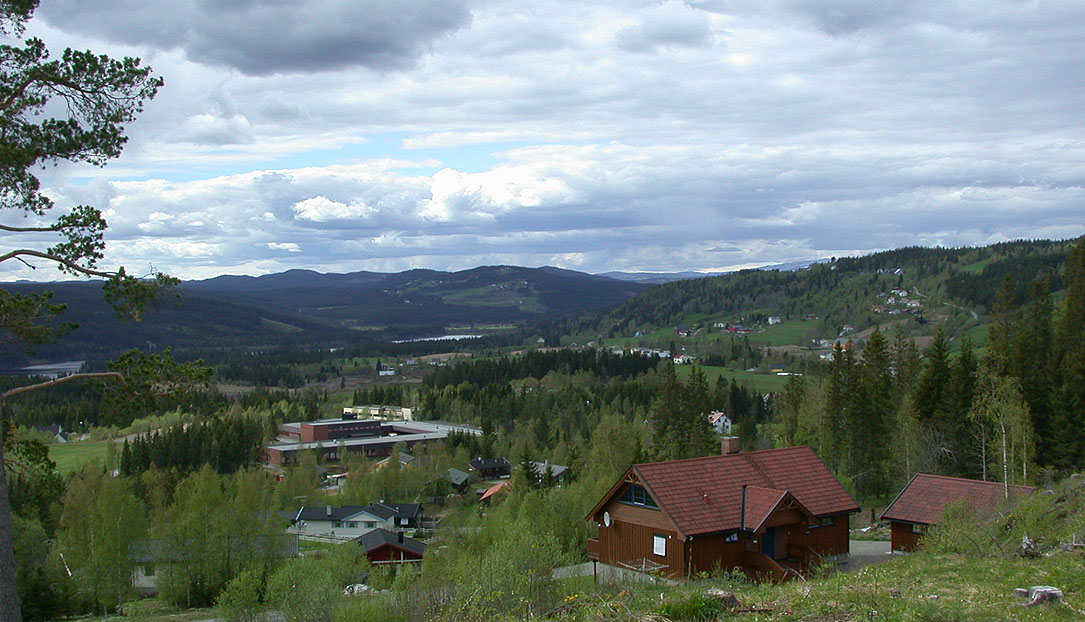
- View of the village area
- Interactive map of Snertingdal
- Location within Innlandet Location within Norway
- Coordinates: 60.88016°N 10.39563°E
- Country: Norway
- Region: Eastern Norway
- County: Innlandet
- District: Vestoppland
- Municipality: Gjøvik Municipality
- Elevation: 432 m (1,417 ft)
- Time zone: UTC+01:00 (CET)
  - Summer (DST): UTC+02:00 (CEST)
- Post Code: 2838 Snertingdal

Snertingdal is a rural village in Gjøvik Municipality in Innlandet county, Norway. The village is located in the Snertingdalen valley, on the north side of the lake Ringsjøen, about 20 kilometres (12 mi) to the northwest of the town of Gjøvik.

Seegård Church is located about 4 kilometres (2.5 mi) to the east of the village.
