= Sandefjord Skofabrikk =

Former Norwegian shoe factory

- Formerly: Sandefjords Skofabrik
- Type: Aksjeselskap
- Industry: Footwear
- Founded: 1908
- Defunct: 2001 (production)
- Fate: Production closed
- Headquarters: Sandefjord, Norway
- Key people: Anders B. Hasle
- Products: Men's and children's shoes, safety shoes

Sandefjord Skofabrikk was one of the country's leading producers of men's and children's shoes. At its peak before 1970, the factory produced over 400,000 pairs of shoes a year. Production was closed in 2001, and the factory building at the Tempo junction on the edge of Sandefjord town center was converted into apartments.

== History ==
Sandefjords Skofabrik was founded by Anders B. Hasle in 1908 in the premises of the closed tannery in Storgaten. Machines were bought secondhand from a closed shoe factory in Kragerø, and electric power was supplied from the town's dairy until the municipal power plant came into operation. From a modest start, by 1914 it had worked its way up to being a nationally known business with a workforce of about sixty women and men.

The factory was completely destroyed in the town fire of 1915 but rebuilt in a larger version in 1916, and at the same time it was made into a joint-stock company to raise capital for expanded investment. The factory supplied, among other things, boots to the strongly expanding whaling in the Southern Ocean, with most of the whaling companies on its customer list. It was expanded in 1933 and had over a hundred workers in 1935, being one of Sandefjord's largest workplaces for women. During the Second World War much of the production stopped, but a large-scale repair operation was started, along with the production of shoe savers and the use of substitute materials such as wooden soles, and the factory also began selling paper shoes, though it did not make them itself.

=== Postwar crisis and new investment ===
The postwar period was turbulent, with long periods of shutdown and layoffs in 1951. The company nonetheless chose to invest more heavily, with ambitions for a new factory on the old Tempo sports ground, which it acquired. First, however, a dedicated factory was built for the modernized production of leather men's shoes with a vulcanized sole, a new technique that gave cheaper and better shoes and a boost for the "National" brand. This made it possible to finally build the new factory on the Tempo ground, designed by the Sandefjord architect Skottun. The new factory was organized in yet another subsidiary named A/S Ekko, production and administration were moved there in 1963, and by 1973 all production was gathered there.

The shoe factory in Sandefjord was among the leading ones in Norway and held up relatively well through the 1960s in a shoe-factory industry in strong decline, partly as a result of competition from abroad. The Sandefjord factory rationalized production, including by reducing the number of shoe models from over 160 variants to a few basic models. The factory had in any case always focused on the simpler market of men's and children's shoes and avoided the more complicated fashion picture of the women's-shoe world. By the late 1960s it produced about 400,000 pairs of shoes a year.

=== Defense contracts ===
After 1973–1974 the factory began producing safety shoes, which in time became its only self-produced product, while the agency and sale of other shoes became the main focus. Some self-production of classic men's shoes was still maintained through the 1980s via defense contracts, as with others of the few remaining Norwegian shoe factories, and in 1983 the factory won a large order for shoes for the armed forces' new leave uniform.

=== Decline and closure ===
Through the 1990s the decline continued with downsizing and occasional shutdowns. In 1999 bankruptcy proceedings were narrowly avoided through new shareholders in the form of the Gjøvik company Bekken og Strøm, and with that the last generation of the founding Hasle family left the story. In 2000 the new owners moved the office, production, and storage to new premises at Pindsle, and the following year all production was closed. The last usable production machines were sold to the neighboring factory Klaveness, then one of a small handful of remaining Norwegian shoe factories.
