= Oppland Arbeiderblad =

Norwegian newspaper

- Type: daily
- Founded: 1924; 102 years ago
- City: Gjøvik
- Country: Norway
- Website: oa.no

Oppland Arbeiderblad (OA) is a newspaper based in Gjøvik, Norway.

It was founded in 1924 after the Labour Party lost its newspaper in the city, Ny Dag, to the Communists. At that time there were several daily newspapers in Vestoppland, but Oppland Arbeiderblad is now alone after Samhold went bankrupt in 1998. The online edition of Oppland Arbeiderblad was launched in 1998, which led to an uptick in subscribers preferring e-paper over physical newspapers, leading to the decision in October 2022 to reduce the print edition from six to three weekdays.<ref name="nor"
