= Gjøvik Municipality =

Municipality in Innlandet, Norway

Gjøvik Municipality Gjøvik kommune
- Municipality
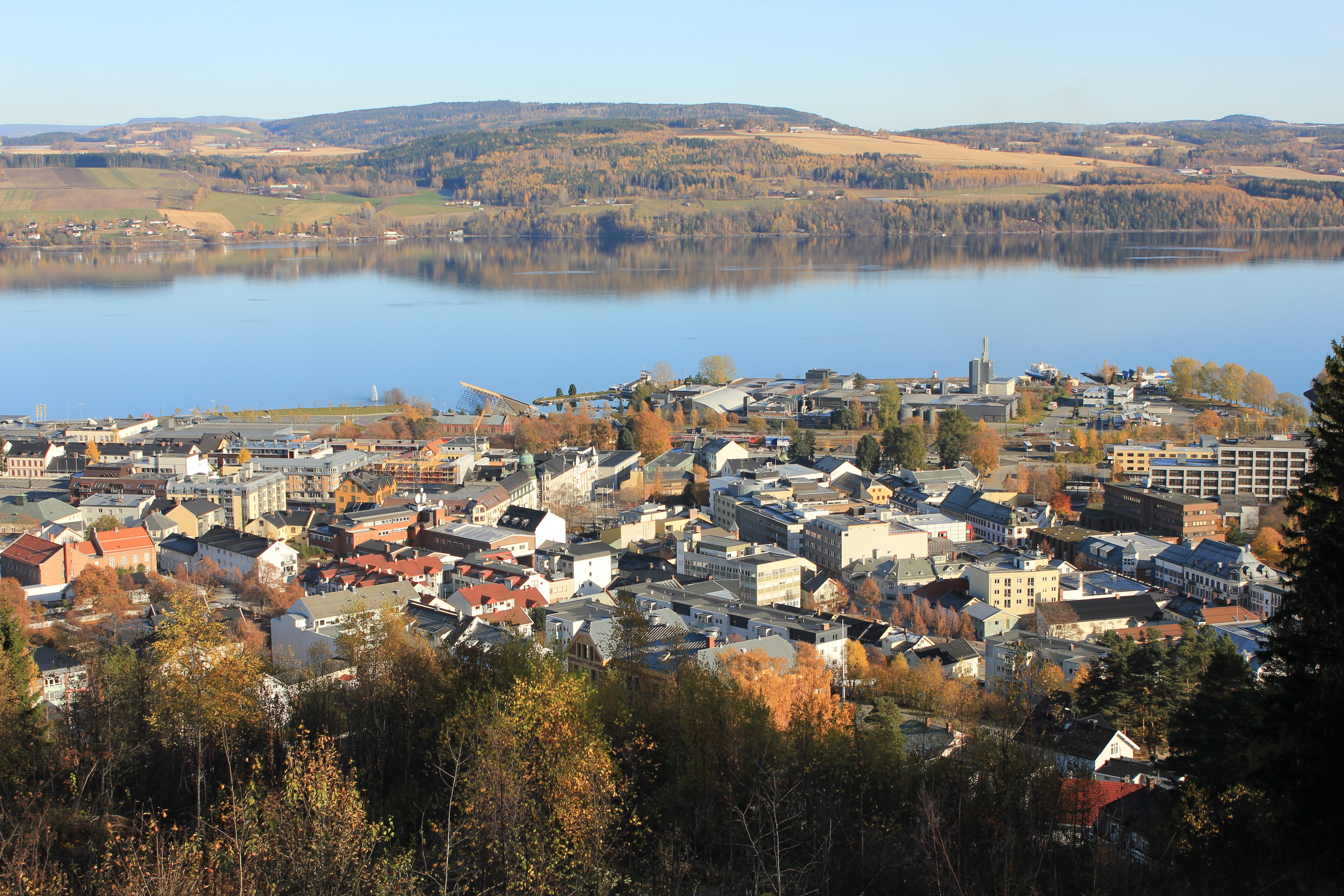
- View of the town of Gjøvik

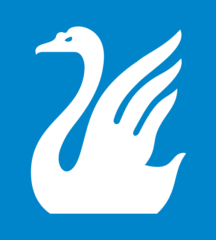
- Flag Coat of arms

- Innlandet within Norway

- Gjøvik within Innlandet
- Coordinates: 60°47′33″N 10°41′42″E
- Country: Norway
- County: Innlandet
- District: Vestoppland
- Established: 1 Jan 1861
  - Preceded by: Vardal Municipality
- Administrative centre: Gjøvik

Government
  - Mayor (2023): Anne Bjertnæs (H)

Area
  - Total: 671.11 km^{2} (259.12 sq mi)
  - Land: 628.91 km^{2} (242.82 sq mi)
  - Water: 42.2 km^{2} (16.3 sq mi) 6.3%
  - Rank: #169 in Norway
- Highest elevation: 837.64 m (2,748.2 ft)

Population (2025)
  - Total: 31,175
  - Rank: #35 in Norway
  - Density: 46.5/km^{2} (120/sq mi)
  - Change (10 years): ▲ +4.2%
- Demonym(s): Gjøvikenser; Gjøvikensar

Official language
  - Norwegian form: Bokmål
- Time zone: UTC+01:00 (CET)
  - Summer (DST): UTC+02:00 (CEST)
- ISO 3166 code: NO-3407
- Website: Official website

Gjøvik (Gjøvik) is a municipality in Innlandet county, Norway. The administrative centre of the municipality is the town of Gjøvik. Some of the villages in Gjøvik include Biri, Bybrua, Hunndalen, Snertingdal, and Vardal.

The 671-square-kilometre (259 sq mi) municipality is the 169th largest by area out of the 357 municipalities in Norway. Gjøvik Municipality is the 35th most populous municipality in Norway with a population of 31,175. The municipality's population density is 46.5 inhabitants per square kilometre (120/sq mi) and its population has increased by 4.2% over the previous 10-year period.

== General information ==
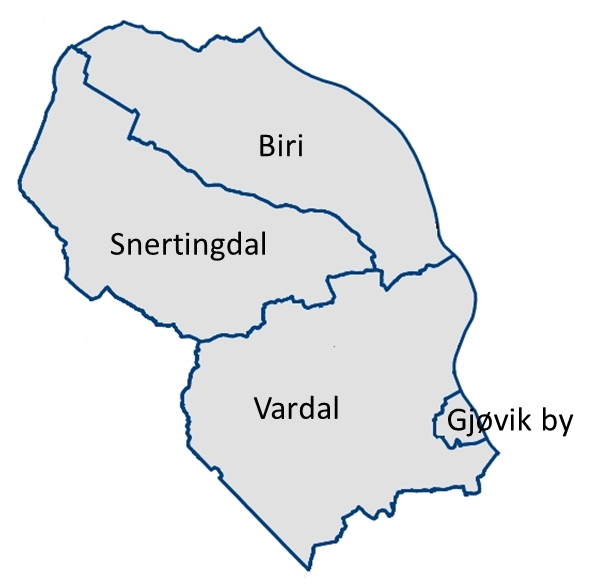
Map of the Gjøvik area before 1964

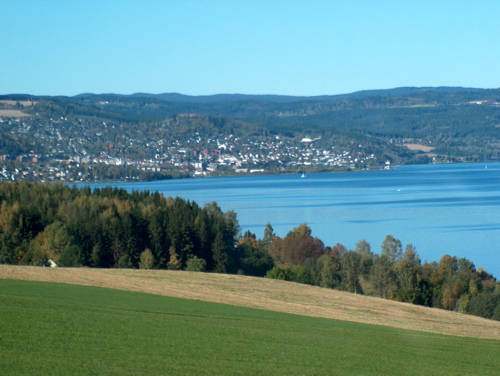
View of Gjøvik from Nordlia

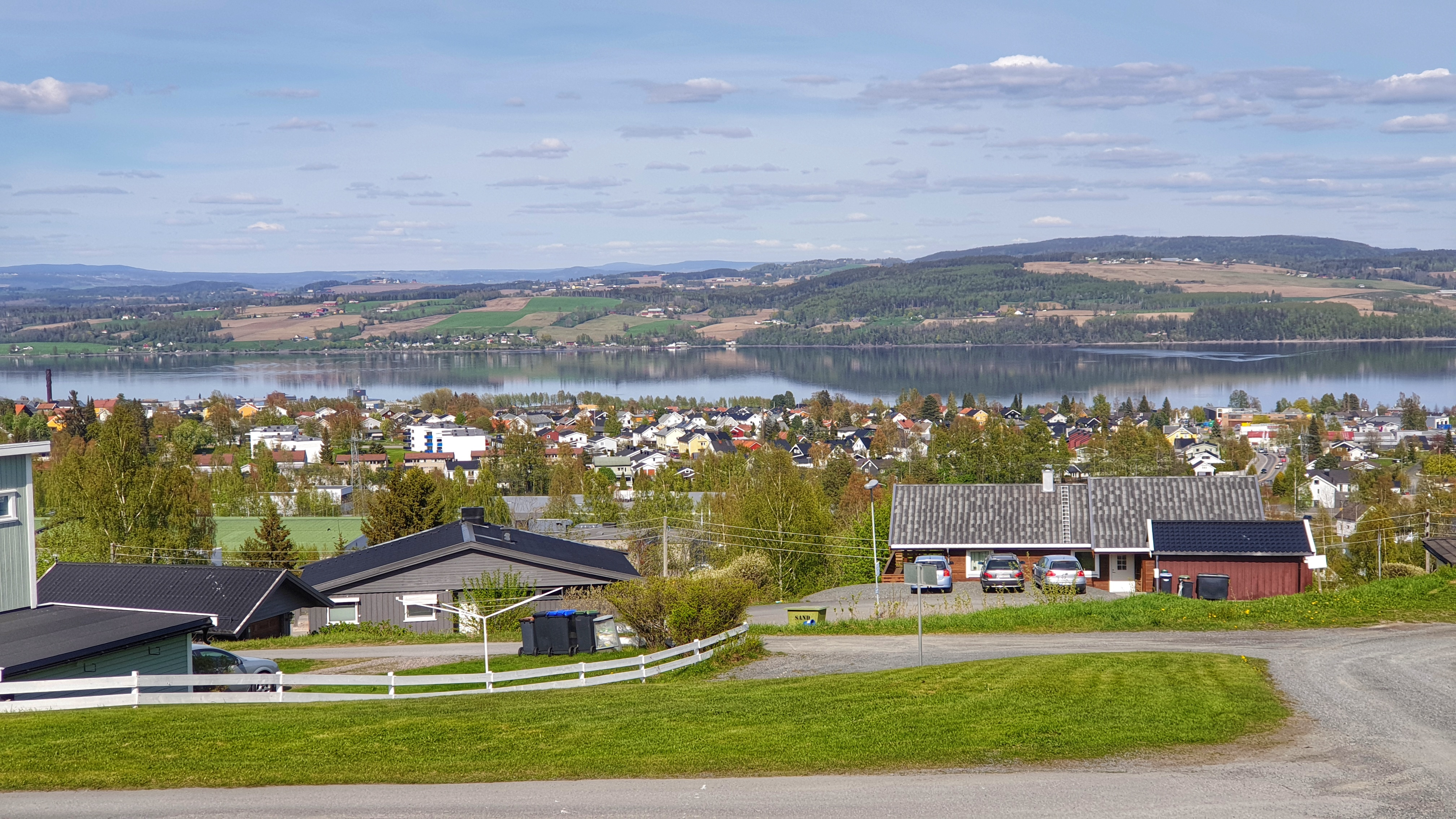
View of the lake Mjøsa seen from Gjøvik

Historically, the village of Gjøvik was part of Vardal Municipality. On 1 January 1861, the village was granted kjøpstad (town) status. At that time, the village was separated from Vardal Municipality to form a separate municipality given its new status as a town. Initially, the new town and municipality of Gjøvik had 626 residents. On 1 July 1921, a part of Vardal Municipality located just outside the town of Gjøvik (population: 723) was annexed into the town. Again, on 1 January 1955, another part of Vardal Municipality (population: 1,372) was transferred to the town.

During the 1960s, there were many municipal mergers across Norway due to the work of the Schei Committee. On 1 January 1964, the following areas were merged to form a new, larger Gjøvik Municipality with 23,608 residents:

- the town of Gjøvik (population: 8,251)
- Biri Municipality (population: 3,274)
- Snertingdal Municipality (population: 2,471)
- most of Vardal Municipality (population: (9,612)

Historically, this municipality was part of the old Oppland county. On 1 January 2020, the municipality became a part of the newly-formed Innlandet county (after Hedmark and Oppland counties were merged).

=== Etymology ===
The municipality (originally the town) is named after the old Gjøvik farm (Old Norse: Djúpvík). The first element is djúpr which means "deep". The last element is vík which means "small bay" or "inlet".

=== Coat of arms ===
The original coat of arms was granted in 1922 and it was in use until 2 September 1960 when a new coat of arms was put into use. The diagonal division of the shield shows green and white to symbolise the dark forests around the (light) city. The vertical wavy pale symbolises the Hunnselva river that runs into the lake Mjøsa (the largest lake in Norway). At the same time the pale also symbolizes a linden tree (which has no known symbolism). The linden tree has yellow leaves over the green background and red leaves over the white background. The arms included the statement Vis et voluntas (meaning "force and will") on the lower part of the shield. The base of the design was meant to look like both water (the lake) and also a so-called "potpourri" vase, the most significant design of the glassworks factory that was the founding industry of the town. Photo of the old arms.

The current coat of arms was granted on 2 September 1960 to replace an older coat of arms. The official blazon is "Azure, a swan naiant argent" (Norwegian: På blå bunn en svømmende sølv svane). This means the arms have a blue field (background) and the charge is a swimming swan (Cygnus cygnus). The swan has a tincture of argent which means it is commonly colored white, but if it is made out of metal, then silver is used. The swan is a symbol for the side-wheel steamer Skiblander, often called the "white swan of Mjøsa", which is usually docked in the town harbor. The arms were designed by Finn Krafft. The municipal flag has the same design as the coat of arms.

=== Churches ===
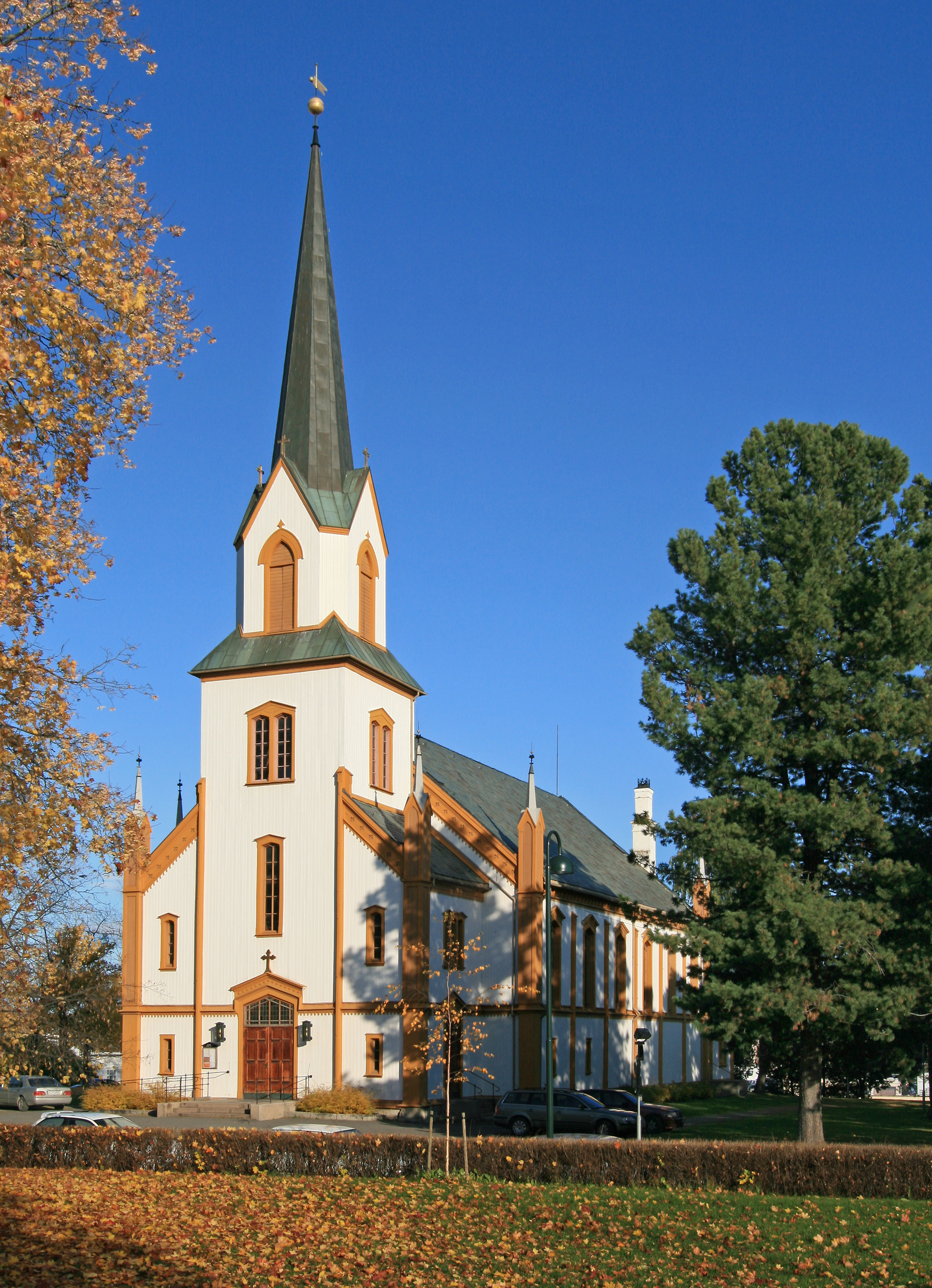
Gjøvik Church

The Church of Norway has seven parishes (sokn) within Gjøvik Municipality. It is part of the Toten prosti (deanery) in the Diocese of Hamar.

Churches in Gjøvik Municipality
| Parish (sokn) | Church name | Location of the church | Year built |
|---|---|---|---|
| Biri | Biri Church | Biri | 1777 |
| Bråstad | Bråstad Church | Bråstad | 1963 |
| Engehaugen | Engehaugen Church | Gjøvik | 1994 |
| Gjøvik | Gjøvik Church | Gjøvik | 1882 |
| Hunn | Hunn Church | Hunndalen | 1968 |
| Snertingdal | Nykirke | Ålset in Snertingdalen | 1872 |
| Snertingdal | Seegård Church | Seegård | 1997 |
| Vardal | Vardal Church | Øverbygda | 1803 |

Gjøvik Church is the main church for the municipality. It was designed by architect Jacob Wilhelm Nordan. The wooden structure was built between 1881 and 1882. Both the church buildings and fixtures are designed in Gothic Revival architecture. The exterior of the church has contrasting colors on wall surfaces and bearing structures. The altarpiece was painted by artist, Asta Nørregaard. The churchyard has a monument dedicated to the memory of Lutheran missionary, Paul Olaf Bodding. The church was restored during 1927, 1960, 2004-2005 and in 2009.

== Geography ==
Number of minorities (1st and 2nd generation) in Gjøvik by country of origin in 2022
| Ancestry | Number |
|---|---|
| Poland | 453 |
| Eritrea | 334 |
| Somalia | 309 |
| Syria | 265 |
| Iran | 225 |
| Iraq | 219 |
| Lithuania | 192 |
| Bosnia-Herzegovina | 168 |
| China | 159 |
| Afghanistan | 145 |
| Sweden | 143 |
| Thailand | 125 |
| Vietnam | 120 |
| Germany | 118 |
| Kosovo | 105 |
| Myanmar | 105 |
| Russia | 101 |

Along with Hamar, Lillehammer, Brumunddal, and Moelv, Gjøvik is one of the many towns bordering Norway's biggest lake, Mjøsa. The municipality includes the town of Gjøvik plus the suburb area Hunndalen and the rural villages of Biri, Snertingdal, and Vardal.

Gjøvik Municipality is bordered on the north by Lillehammer Municipality, in the south by Østre Toten Municipality and Vestre Toten Municipality, and in the west by Søndre Land Municipality and Nordre Land Municipality. Across Lake Mjøsa to the east lies Ringsaker Municipality.

The highest point in the municipality is the 837.64-metre (2,748.2 ft) tall mountain Ringsrudåsen, located on the border with Nordre Land Municipality.

== Economy ==
Gjøvik Municipality owes much of its early growth to the local glassworks, which were established there by Caspar Kauffeldt in 1807. In the early 19th century, there was considerable immigration there from Valdres and Western Norway, aiding Gjøvik's growth. The village of Gjøvik was granted kjøpstad status in 1861, making it a town and self-governing municipality. Later, O. Mustad & Son became one of the world's largest manufacturers of fish hooks.

Today dolphitech, Hoff Potetindustrier, Hunton Fiber, and Natre Vinduer are some of the industrial companies operating from Gjøvik. The town is also a port for the former traffic ship, Skibladner, which is now a tourist ship.

The local paper is the Oppland Arbeiderblad. It was formerly a Labour Party newspaper. Defunct newspapers include Oplændingen and Velgeren (Labour Democrat/Liberal), Samhold (Liberal, later Agrarian) and Ny Dag (Communist).

Gjøvik has two notable hotels, the Grand hotel and the Strand hotel.

There have been three notable concerts held in Gjøvik's history, which starred Toto, Robbie Williams and Bryan Adams (June 2011).

== Government ==
Gjøvik Municipality is responsible for primary education (through 10th grade), outpatient health services, senior citizen services, welfare and other social services, zoning, economic development, and municipal roads and utilities. The municipality is governed by a municipal council of directly elected representatives. The mayor is indirectly elected by a vote of the municipal council. The municipality is under the jurisdiction of the Vestoppland og Valdres District Court and the Eidsivating Court of Appeal.

=== Municipal council ===
The municipal council (Kommunestyre) of Gjøvik Municipality is made up of 41 representatives that are elected to four year terms. The tables below show the current and historical composition of the council by political party.

Gjøvik kommunestyre 2023–2027
| Party name (in Norwegian) | Number of representatives |
|---|---|
| Labour Party (Arbeiderpartiet) | 11 |
| Progress Party (Fremskrittspartiet) | 4 |
| Green Party (Miljøpartiet De Grønne) | 1 |
| Conservative Party (Høyre) | 9 |
| Industry and Business Party (Industri‑ og Næringspartiet) | 1 |
| Christian Democratic Party (Kristelig Folkeparti) | 1 |
| Red Party (Rødt) | 3 |
| Centre Party (Senterpartiet) | 8 |
| Socialist Left Party (Sosialistisk Venstreparti) | 2 |
| Liberal Party (Venstre) | 1 |
| Total number of members: | 41 |

Gjøvik kommunestyre 2019–2023
| Party name (in Norwegian) | Number of representatives |
|---|---|
| Labour Party (Arbeiderpartiet) | 14 |
| Progress Party (Fremskrittspartiet) | 2 |
| Green Party (Miljøpartiet De Grønne) | 2 |
| Conservative Party (Høyre) | 8 |
| Christian Democratic Party (Kristelig Folkeparti) | 1 |
| Red Party (Rødt) | 2 |
| Centre Party (Senterpartiet) | 9 |
| Socialist Left Party (Sosialistisk Venstreparti) | 2 |
| Liberal Party (Venstre) | 1 |
| Total number of members: | 41 |

Gjøvik kommunestyre 2015–2019
| Party name (in Norwegian) | Number of representatives |
|---|---|
| Labour Party (Arbeiderpartiet) | 19 |
| Progress Party (Fremskrittspartiet) | 2 |
| Green Party (Miljøpartiet De Grønne) | 1 |
| Conservative Party (Høyre) | 9 |
| Christian Democratic Party (Kristelig Folkeparti) | 2 |
| Pensioners' Party (Pensjonistpartiet) | 2 |
| Red Party (Rødt) | 2 |
| Centre Party (Senterpartiet) | 5 |
| Socialist Left Party (Sosialistisk Venstreparti) | 1 |
| Liberal Party (Venstre) | 2 |
| Total number of members: | 45 |

Gjøvik kommunestyre 2011–2015
| Party name (in Norwegian) | Number of representatives |
|---|---|
| Labour Party (Arbeiderpartiet) | 20 |
| Progress Party (Fremskrittspartiet) | 2 |
| Conservative Party (Høyre) | 11 |
| Christian Democratic Party (Kristelig Folkeparti) | 2 |
| Pensioners' Party (Pensjonistpartiet) | 2 |
| Red Party (Rødt) | 1 |
| Centre Party (Senterpartiet) | 3 |
| Socialist Left Party (Sosialistisk Venstreparti) | 1 |
| Liberal Party (Venstre) | 3 |
| Total number of members: | 45 |

Gjøvik kommunestyre 2007–2011
| Party name (in Norwegian) | Number of representatives |
|---|---|
| Labour Party (Arbeiderpartiet) | 19 |
| Progress Party (Fremskrittspartiet) | 6 |
| Conservative Party (Høyre) | 6 |
| Christian Democratic Party (Kristelig Folkeparti) | 3 |
| Pensioners' Party (Pensjonistpartiet) | 2 |
| Red Electoral Alliance (Rød Valgallianse) | 1 |
| Centre Party (Senterpartiet) | 3 |
| Socialist Left Party (Sosialistisk Venstreparti) | 3 |
| Liberal Party (Venstre) | 2 |
| Total number of members: | 45 |

Gjøvik kommunestyre 2003–2007
| Party name (in Norwegian) | Number of representatives |
|---|---|
| Labour Party (Arbeiderpartiet) | 21 |
| Progress Party (Fremskrittspartiet) | 6 |
| Conservative Party (Høyre) | 5 |
| Christian Democratic Party (Kristelig Folkeparti) | 3 |
| Red Electoral Alliance (Rød Valgallianse) | 1 |
| Centre Party (Senterpartiet) | 3 |
| Socialist Left Party (Sosialistisk Venstreparti) | 5 |
| Liberal Party (Venstre) | 1 |
| Total number of members: | 45 |

Gjøvik kommunestyre 1999–2003
| Party name (in Norwegian) | Number of representatives |
|---|---|
| Labour Party (Arbeiderpartiet) | 22 |
| Progress Party (Fremskrittspartiet) | 5 |
| Conservative Party (Høyre) | 6 |
| Christian Democratic Party (Kristelig Folkeparti) | 4 |
| Red Electoral Alliance (Rød Valgallianse) | 1 |
| Centre Party (Senterpartiet) | 3 |
| Socialist Left Party (Sosialistisk Venstreparti) | 3 |
| Liberal Party (Venstre) | 1 |
| Total number of members: | 45 |

Gjøvik kommunestyre 1995–1999
| Party name (in Norwegian) | Number of representatives |
|---|---|
| Labour Party (Arbeiderpartiet) | 24 |
| Progress Party (Fremskrittspartiet) | 5 |
| Conservative Party (Høyre) | 5 |
| Christian Democratic Party (Kristelig Folkeparti) | 3 |
| Centre Party (Senterpartiet) | 5 |
| Socialist Left Party (Sosialistisk Venstreparti) | 2 |
| Liberal Party (Venstre) | 1 |
| Total number of members: | 45 |

Gjøvik kommunestyre 1991–1995
| Party name (in Norwegian) | Number of representatives |
|---|---|
| Labour Party (Arbeiderpartiet) | 24 |
| Progress Party (Fremskrittspartiet) | 2 |
| Conservative Party (Høyre) | 10 |
| Christian Democratic Party (Kristelig Folkeparti) | 4 |
| Centre Party (Senterpartiet) | 7 |
| Socialist Left Party (Sosialistisk Venstreparti) | 9 |
| Liberal Party (Venstre) | 2 |
| [[Bygdeliste|Grassroots list]] (Grasrotlista) | 3 |
| Total number of members: | 61 |

Gjøvik kommunestyre 1987–1991
| Party name (in Norwegian) | Number of representatives |
|---|---|
| Labour Party (Arbeiderpartiet) | 33 |
| Progress Party (Fremskrittspartiet) | 6 |
| Conservative Party (Høyre) | 9 |
| Christian Democratic Party (Kristelig Folkeparti) | 4 |
| Centre Party (Senterpartiet) | 4 |
| Socialist Left Party (Sosialistisk Venstreparti) | 3 |
| Liberal Party (Venstre) | 2 |
| Total number of members: | 61 |

Gjøvik kommunestyre 1983–1987
| Party name (in Norwegian) | Number of representatives |
|---|---|
| Labour Party (Arbeiderpartiet) | 36 |
| Progress Party (Fremskrittspartiet) | 2 |
| Conservative Party (Høyre) | 10 |
| Christian Democratic Party (Kristelig Folkeparti) | 4 |
| Centre Party (Senterpartiet) | 4 |
| Socialist Left Party (Sosialistisk Venstreparti) | 3 |
| Liberal Party (Venstre) | 2 |
| Total number of members: | 61 |

Gjøvik kommunestyre 1979–1983
| Party name (in Norwegian) | Number of representatives |
|---|---|
| Labour Party (Arbeiderpartiet) | 34 |
| Progress Party (Fremskrittspartiet) | 1 |
| Conservative Party (Høyre) | 12 |
| Christian Democratic Party (Kristelig Folkeparti) | 5 |
| Centre Party (Senterpartiet) | 4 |
| Socialist Left Party (Sosialistisk Venstreparti) | 2 |
| Liberal Party (Venstre) | 3 |
| Total number of members: | 61 |

Gjøvik kommunestyre 1975–1979
| Party name (in Norwegian) | Number of representatives |
|---|---|
| Labour Party (Arbeiderpartiet) | 37 |
| Conservative Party (Høyre) | 7 |
| Christian Democratic Party (Kristelig Folkeparti) | 6 |
| Centre Party (Senterpartiet) | 7 |
| Socialist Left Party (Sosialistisk Venstreparti) | 2 |
| Liberal Party (Venstre) | 2 |
| Total number of members: | 61 |

Gjøvik kommunestyre 1971–1975
| Party name (in Norwegian) | Number of representatives |
|---|---|
| Labour Party (Arbeiderpartiet) | 37 |
| Conservative Party (Høyre) | 6 |
| Christian Democratic Party (Kristelig Folkeparti) | 6 |
| Centre Party (Senterpartiet) | 7 |
| Liberal Party (Venstre) | 3 |
| Socialist common list (Venstresosialistiske felleslister) | 2 |
| Total number of members: | 61 |

Gjøvik kommunestyre 1967–1971
| Party name (in Norwegian) | Number of representatives |
|---|---|
| Labour Party (Arbeiderpartiet) | 38 |
| Conservative Party (Høyre) | 7 |
| Christian Democratic Party (Kristelig Folkeparti) | 4 |
| Centre Party (Senterpartiet) | 6 |
| Socialist People's Party (Sosialistisk Folkeparti) | 3 |
| Liberal Party (Venstre) | 3 |
| Total number of members: | 61 |

Gjøvik kommunestyre 1963–1967
| Party name (in Norwegian) | Number of representatives |
|---|---|
| Labour Party (Arbeiderpartiet) | 40 |
| Conservative Party (Høyre) | 7 |
| Communist Party (Kommunistiske Parti) | 1 |
| Christian Democratic Party (Kristelig Folkeparti) | 4 |
| Centre Party (Senterpartiet) | 6 |
| Liberal Party (Venstre) | 3 |
| Total number of members: | 61 |
Note: On 1 January 1964, Biri Municipality, Snertingdal Municipality, and Vardal Municipality were merged with Gjøvik to form a new, larger Gjøvik Municipality.

Gjøvik bystyre 1959–1963
| Party name (in Norwegian) | Number of representatives |
|---|---|
| Labour Party (Arbeiderpartiet) | 23 |
| Conservative Party (Høyre) | 7 |
| Communist Party (Kommunistiske Parti) | 2 |
| Christian Democratic Party (Kristelig Folkeparti) | 3 |
| Liberal Party (Venstre) | 2 |
| Total number of members: | 37 |

Gjøvik bystyre 1955–1959
| Party name (in Norwegian) | Number of representatives |
|---|---|
| Labour Party (Arbeiderpartiet) | 22 |
| Conservative Party (Høyre) | 7 |
| Communist Party (Kommunistiske Parti) | 3 |
| Christian Democratic Party (Kristelig Folkeparti) | 3 |
| Liberal Party (Venstre) | 2 |
| Total number of members: | 37 |

Gjøvik bystyre 1951–1955
| Party name (in Norwegian) | Number of representatives |
|---|---|
| Labour Party (Arbeiderpartiet) | 20 |
| Conservative Party (Høyre) | 7 |
| Communist Party (Kommunistiske Parti) | 3 |
| Christian Democratic Party (Kristelig Folkeparti) | 3 |
| Liberal Party (Venstre) | 3 |
| Total number of members: | 36 |

Gjøvik bystyre 1947–1951
| Party name (in Norwegian) | Number of representatives |
|---|---|
| Labour Party (Arbeiderpartiet) | 18 |
| Conservative Party (Høyre) | 5 |
| Communist Party (Kommunistiske Parti) | 5 |
| Christian Democratic Party (Kristelig Folkeparti) | 4 |
| Joint list of the Liberal Party (Venstre) and the Radical People's Party (Radikale Folkepartiet) | 4 |
| Total number of members: | 36 |

Gjøvik bystyre 1945–1947
| Party name (in Norwegian) | Number of representatives |
|---|---|
| Labour Party (Arbeiderpartiet) | 17 |
| Communist Party (Kommunistiske Parti) | 8 |
| Christian Democratic Party (Kristelig Folkeparti) | 4 |
| Joint list of the Liberal Party (Venstre) and the Radical People's Party (Radikale Folkepartiet) | 3 |
| Joint List(s) of Non-Socialist Parties (Borgerlige Felleslister) | 4 |
| Total number of members: | 36 |

Gjøvik bystyre 1937–1940*
| Party name (in Norwegian) | Number of representatives |
|---|---|
| Labour Party (Arbeiderpartiet) | 22 |
| Nasjonal Samling Party (Nasjonal Samling) | 1 |
| Liberal Party (Venstre) | 5 |
| Joint List(s) of Non-Socialist Parties (Borgerlige Felleslister) | 8 |
| Total number of members: | 36 |
Note: Due to the German occupation of Norway during World War II, no elections were held for new municipal councils until after the war ended in 1945.

Gjøvik bystyre 1934–1937
| Party name (in Norwegian) | Number of representatives |
|---|---|
| Labour Party (Arbeiderpartiet) | 20 |
| Communist Party (Kommunistiske Parti) | 1 |
| Nasjonal Samling Party (Nasjonal Samling) | 4 |
| Liberal Party (Venstre) | 4 |
| Joint List(s) of Non-Socialist Parties (Borgerlige Felleslister) | 7 |
| Total number of members: | 36 |

Gjøvik bystyre 1931–1934
| Party name (in Norwegian) | Number of representatives |
|---|---|
| Labour Party (Arbeiderpartiet) | 18 |
| Communist Party (Kommunistiske Parti) | 1 |
| Liberal Party (Venstre) | 5 |
| Joint List(s) of Non-Socialist Parties (Borgerlige Felleslister) | 12 |
| Total number of members: | 36 |

Gjøvik bystyre 1928–1931
| Party name (in Norwegian) | Number of representatives |
|---|---|
| Labour Party (Arbeiderpartiet) | 17 |
| Communist Party (Kommunistiske Parti) | 2 |
| Joint list: Temperance Party, Democrats, and Liberal Party (Avholdsfolk, demokrater, og Venstre) | 5 |
| Joint List(s) of Non-Socialist Parties (Borgerlige Felleslister) | 12 |
| Total number of members: | 36 |

Gjøvik bystyre 1925–1928
| Party name (in Norwegian) | Number of representatives |
|---|---|
| Labour Party (Arbeiderpartiet) | 14 |
| Social Democratic Labour Party (Socialdemokratiske Arbeiderparti) | 1 |
| Joint list: Liberal Party and Temperance Party (Venstre og avholdspartiet) | 5 |
| Joint List(s) of Non-Socialist Parties (Borgerlige Felleslister) | 13 |
| Workers' Common List (Arbeidernes fellesliste) | 3 |
| Total number of members: | 36 |

Gjøvik bystyre 1922–1925
| Party name (in Norwegian) | Number of representatives |
|---|---|
| Labour Party (Arbeiderpartiet) | 13 |
| Labour Democrats (Arbeiderdemokratene) | 3 |
| Social Democratic Labour Party (Socialdemokratiske Arbeiderparti) | 2 |
| Joint List(s) of Non-Socialist Parties (Borgerlige Felleslister) | 10 |
| Total number of members: | 28 |

Gjøvik bystyre 1919–1922
| Party name (in Norwegian) | Number of representatives |
|---|---|
| Labour Party (Arbeiderpartiet) | 11 |
| Temperance Party (Avholdspartiet) | 3 |
| Gjøvik workers' list (Gjøvik arbeidere) | 3 |
| Joint List(s) of Non-Socialist Parties (Borgerlige Felleslister) | 11 |
| Total number of members: | 28 |

=== Mayors ===
The mayor (Norwegian: ordfører) of Gjøvik Municipality is the political leader of the municipality and the chairperson of the municipal council. Here is a list of people who have held this position:

- 1861–1872: Adolph Martin Lund
- 1873–1873: Peter Soelberg
- 1874–1874: Martin Opsahl
- 1875–1879: Adolph Martin Lund
- 1879–1884: Haagen Skattum (H)
- 1885–1888: Mathias Wildaasen (V)
- 1889–1889: Hans O. Eger (V)
- 1890–1890: Andreas Slettum
- 1891–1893: Fredrik Fischer (H)
- 1894–1894: Christian Nygaard (V)
- 1895–1896: Anders Østbye (V)
- 1897–1898: Fredrik Fischer (H)
- 1898–1899: Anders Østbye (V)
- 1900–1900: Fredrik Fischer (H)
- 1901–1901: Anders Østbye (V)
- 1902–1904: Alf Mjøen (V)
- 1905–1905: Fredrik Fischer (H)
- 1906–1906: Adolf Houg (V)
- 1907–1907: Fredrik Fischer (H)
- 1908–1908: Leif Castberg (AD)
- 1909–1909: Adolf Skattum (H)
- 1910–1916: Leif Castberg (AD)
- 1917–1922: Johan Granvin (H)
- 1923–1941: Niels Ødegaard (Ap)
- 1941–1945: John Lærum (NS)
- 1945–1967: Niels Ødegaard (Ap)
- 1968–1978: Nils Røstadstuen (Ap)
- 1978–1981: Alf Iversen (Ap)
- 1982–1991: Martin Stikbakke (Ap)
- 1992–2000: Tore Hagebakken (Ap)
- 2000–2001: Kåre Haugen (Ap)
- 2001–2005: Tore Hagebakken (Ap)
- 2005–2007: Kåre Haugen (Ap)
- 2007–2019: Bjørn Iddberg (Ap)
- 2019–2023: Torvild Sveen (Sp)
- 2023–present: Anne Bjertnæs (H)

== Attractions ==
- The world's largest arena excavated in rock, called Gjøvik Olympic Hall (Norwegian: Fjellhallen), is located in Gjøvik. It was one of the sites of the Lillehammer Winter Olympics ice hockey games in 1994.
- Gjøvik farm
- Gjøvik glassworks
- Eiktunet cultural-history museum
- The world's oldest paddle steamer still on a regular schedule, the PS Skibladner
- Biri Travbane

== Notable people ==
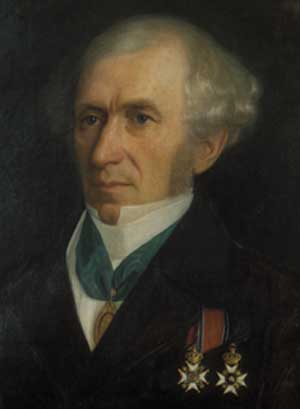
Baltazar Mathias Keilhau, 1857

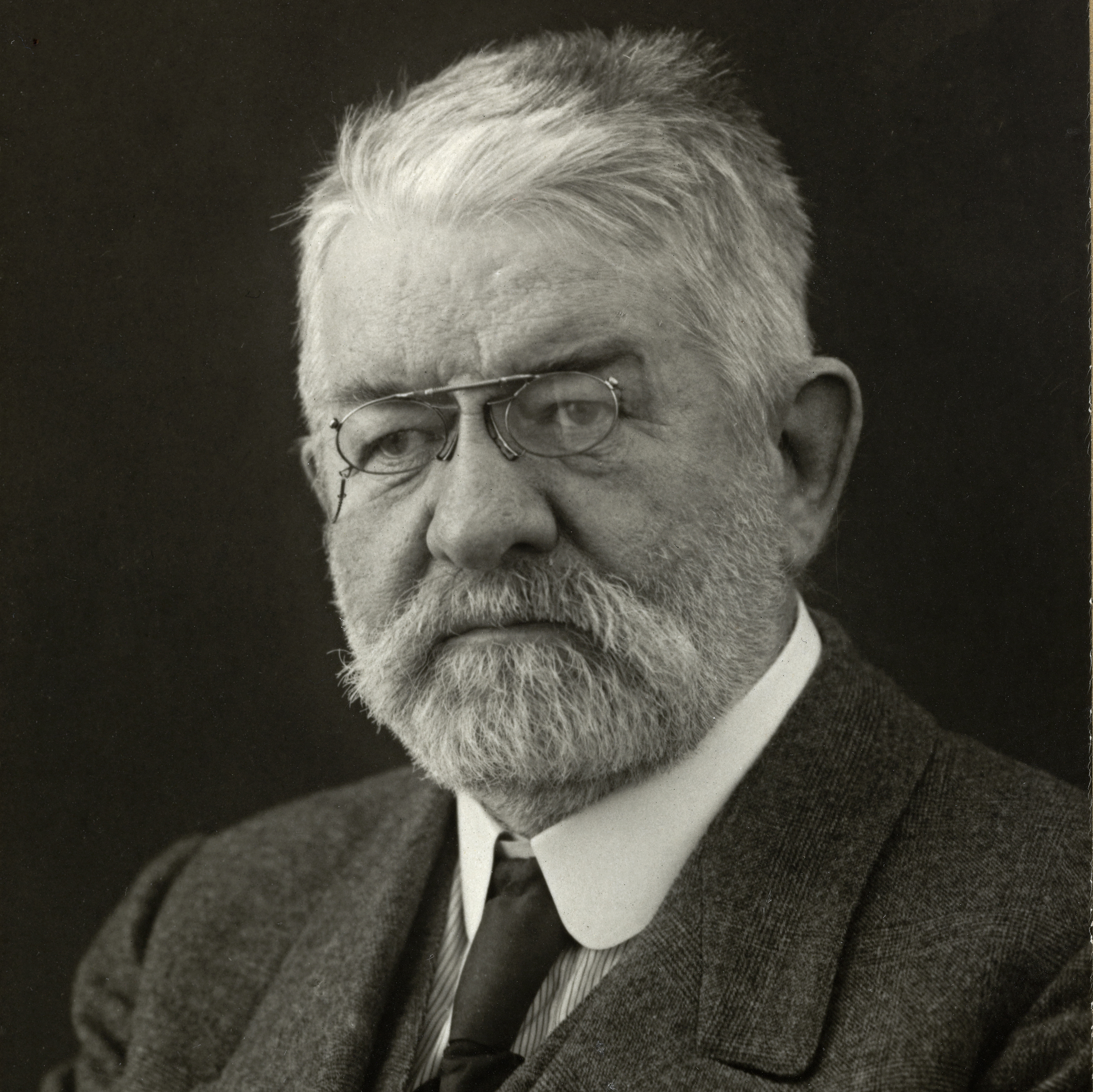
Paul Olaf Bodding, 1925

=== Public Service & public thinking ===
- Anders Lysgaard (1756–1827), a farmer and representative at the Norwegian Constituent Assembly
- Hans Schikkelstad (1789–1843), a farmer and politician who founded O. Mustad & Søn
- Balthazar Mathias Keilhau (1797–1858), a geologist and mountain pioneer
- Hans Mustad (1837–1918), a businessperson who shaped the company O. Mustad & Son
- Johan Castberg (1862–1926), a jurist and politician in Gjøvik from 1890-1900
- Paul Olaf Bodding (1865–1938), a missionary to India memorialized by monument at Gjøvik church
- Ole Evinrude (1877–1934), a Norwegian-American who invented the first practical outboard motor
- Niels Ødegaard (1892–1976), an educator, newspaper editor, and politician
- Harold Harby (1894–1978), a city council member in Los Angeles, California
- Arne Austeen DFC (1911–1945), a flying ace who was killed in WWII
- Ragnhild A. Lothe (born 1958), a microbiologist and cancer researcher
- Hans Olav Lahlum (born 1973), an historian, crime author, chess player, and politician

=== The Arts ===
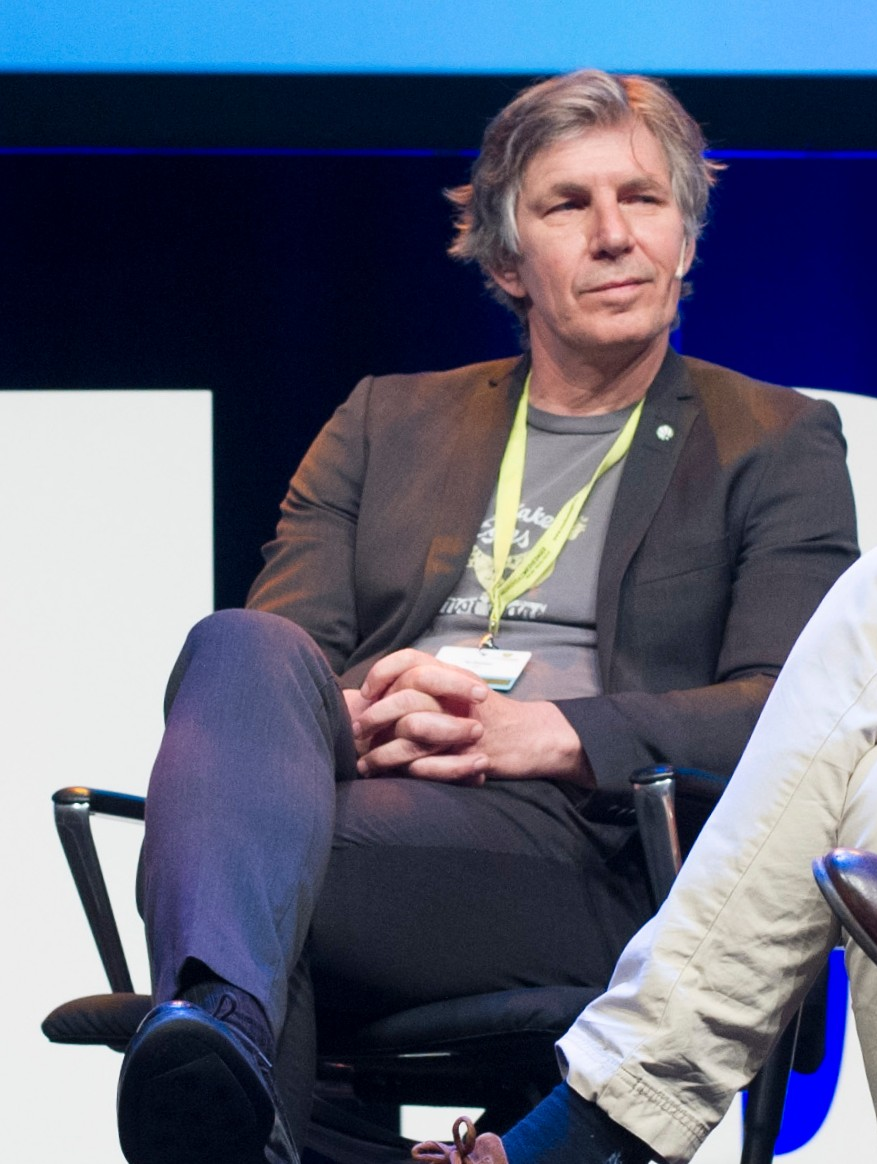
Per Elvestuen, 2015

- Finn Lange (1895–1976), an actor
- Georg Adelly (1919–1997), a Swedish film actor
- Torbjørn Sunde (born 1954), a jazz trombonist and former speed-skater
- Kjell Ola Dahl (born 1958), an author of Nordic noir crime novels
- Per A. Borglund (born 1961), a newspaper and magazine editor
- Per Elvestuen (born 1962), an illustrator
- Mai Britt Normann (born 1966), a singer-songwriter
- Eirik Hegdal (bornr 1973), a jazz saxophonist, composer, and leader of Trondheim Jazz Orchestra
- Ali Pirzad-Amoli (born 1988), a pop singer-songwriter and rapper who goes by the stage name A-Lee
- Anna Lotterud (born 1989), a singer-songwriter who goes by the stage name Anna of the North
- Nora Foss al-Jabri (born 1996), a singer and participant in the Norwegian 2012 Eurovision Song Contest

=== Sport ===
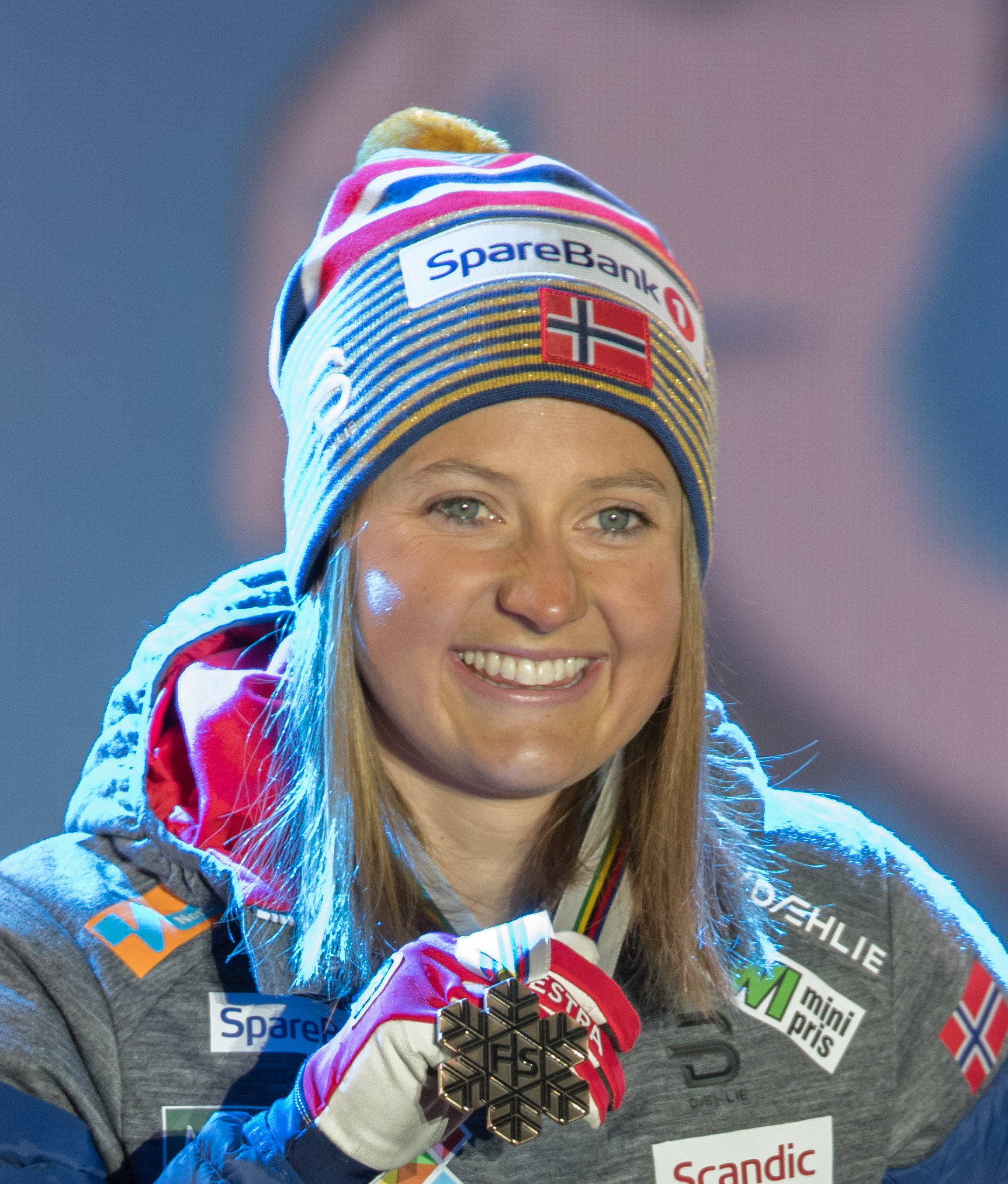
Ingvild Flugstad Oestberg, 2019

- Guttorm Berge (1929–2004), an Alpine skier, bronze medalist at the 1952 Winter Olympics
- Roger Aandalen (born 1965), a boccia player and paralympic medallist
- Bente Nordby (born 1974), a former football goalkeeper with 172 caps with Norway women
- Tord Linnerud (born 1974), a rallycross driver
- Else-Marthe Sørlie Lybekk (born 1978), a retired team handball player and Olympic medallist
- Gro Hammerseng (born 1980), a handball player and captain of the Norwegian national team
- Ingvild Flugstad Østberg (born 1990), a cross-country skier and medallist at the 2014 Winter Olympics
- Maren Lundby (born 1994), a successful ski jumper and gold medallist at the 2018 Winter Olympics

== Twin towns – sister cities ==
Gjøvik is twinned with:

- Gävle, Sweden
- Næstved, Denmark
- Rauma, Finland
- Stoughton, United States

== Media gallery ==
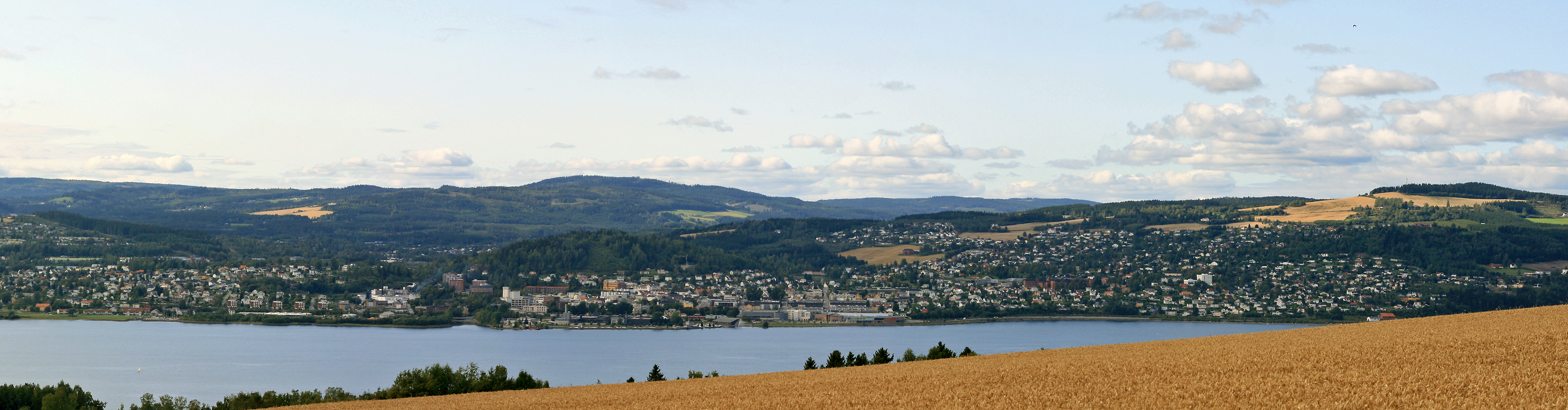
A panorama of Gjøvik
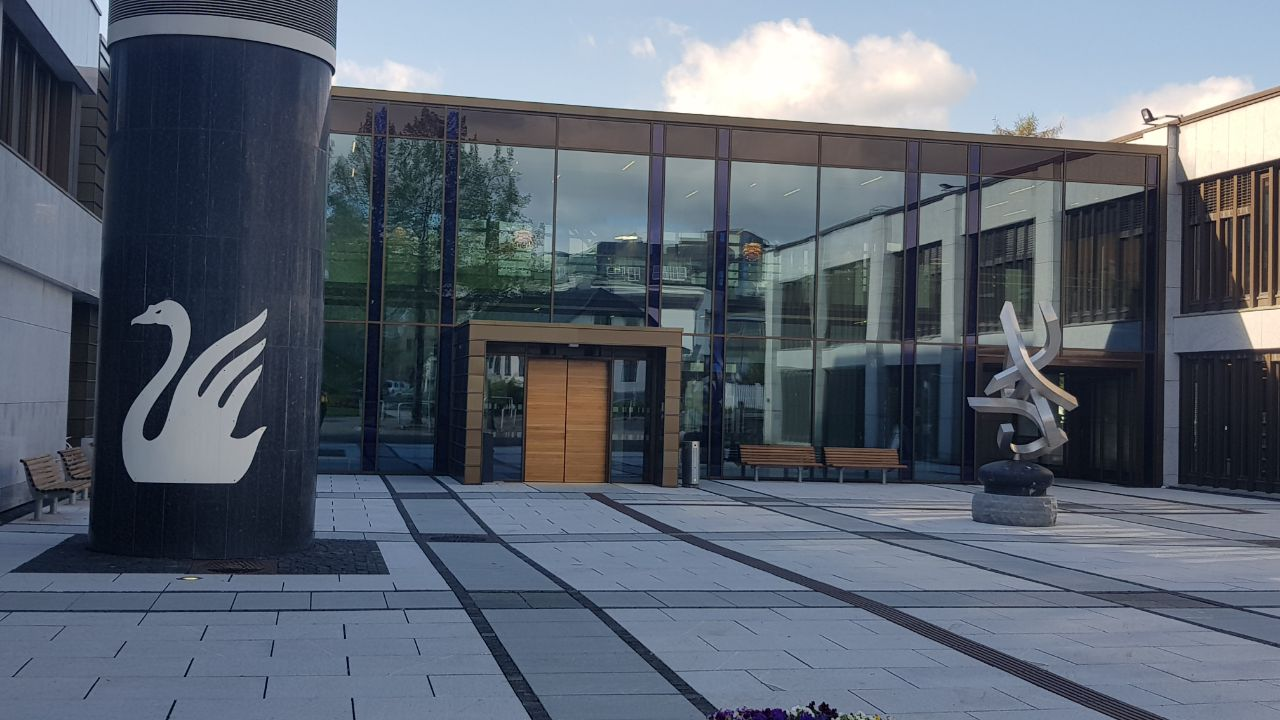
Gjøvik Municipal Hall

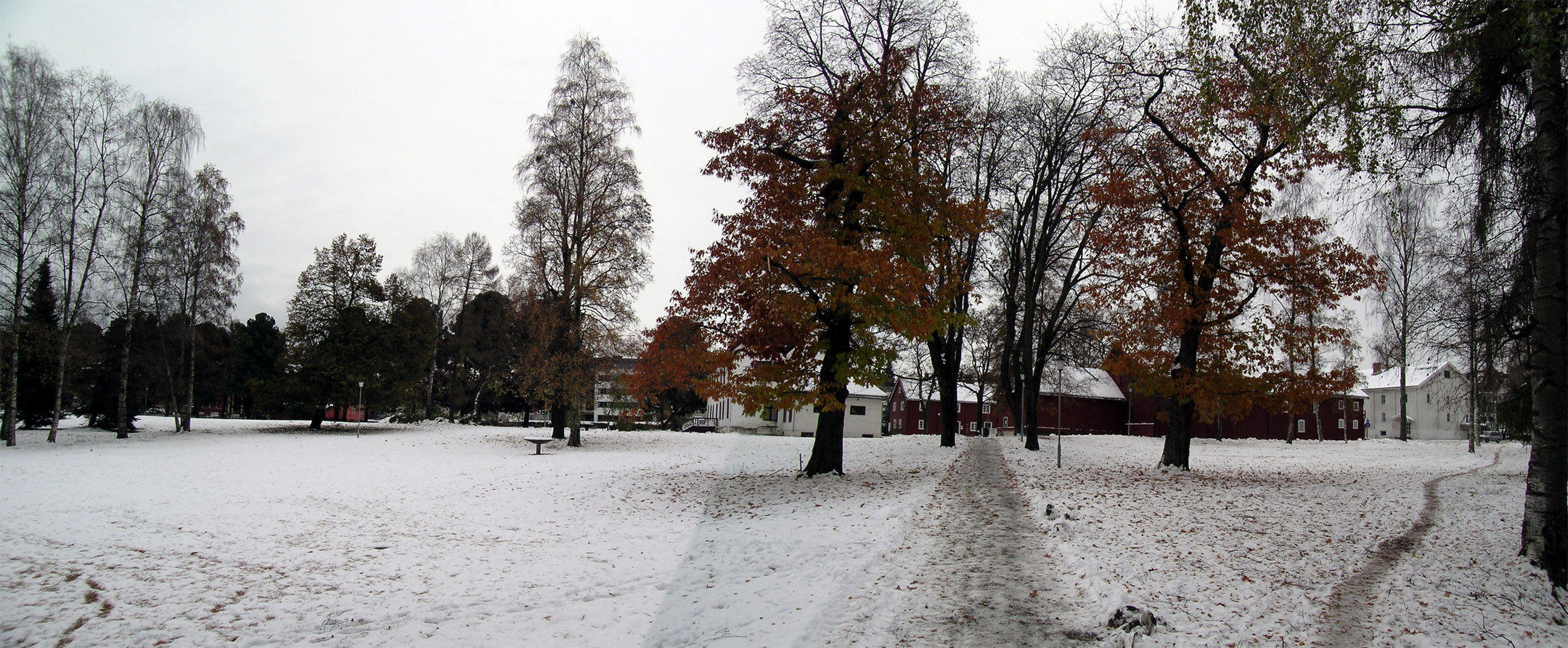
Park at the Gjøvik farm

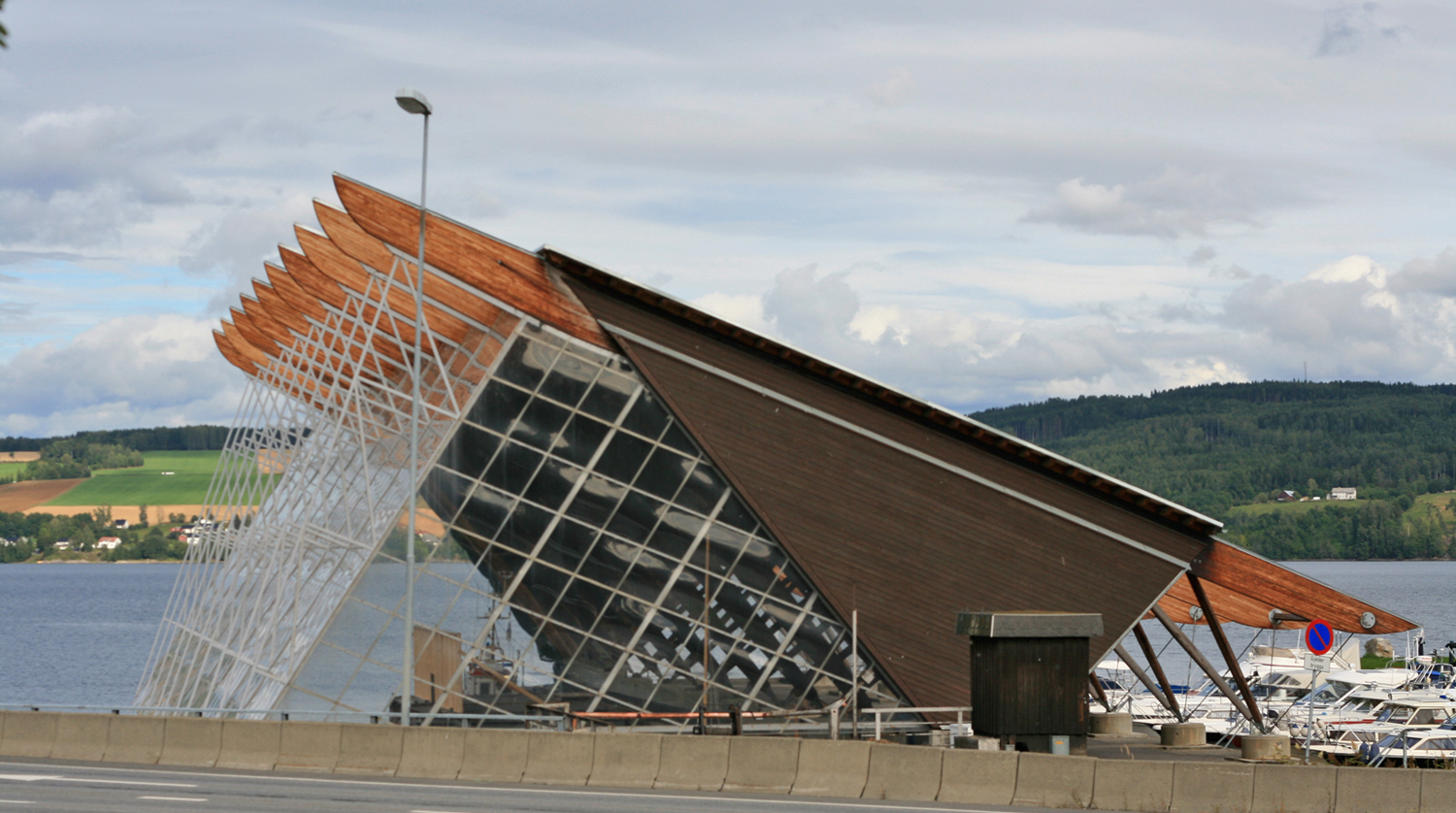
Skibladner boathouse, Gjøvik
