= Haagen Skattum =

Norwegian businessperson and politician

Haagen Skattum (8 November 1824 – 9 September 1900) was a Norwegian businessperson and politician for the Conservative Party.

Haagen Olsen Skattum was born at Østre Toten in Christians amt (county), Norway. He grew up on the Skattum farm near the village of Nordlia. He established the trading company H. Skattum in Gjøvik in 1858. He was a wholesaler and retailer of goods including salt, sugar, coffee and liquor. Trade made the members of the Skattum family among the richest in Gjøvik, together with their main competitor Hans Bernhard Falk (1892–1957).

Haagen Skattum also served as mayor of Gjøvik Municipality from 1879 through 1884. In July 1860, he married Ida Camilla Mæhlum (1838-1913). Together they had five sons: Haakon, Adolf, Ludvig, Ole and Sverre. Adolf served mayor of Gjøvik in the year 1909. Sverre was also a city councillor, and chair of the local savings bank. Sverre and Ludvig inherited H. Skattum together; Ludvig was also a major financial benefactor.
