= Engehaugen Church =

Church in Innlandet, Norway

- Engehaugen kirke
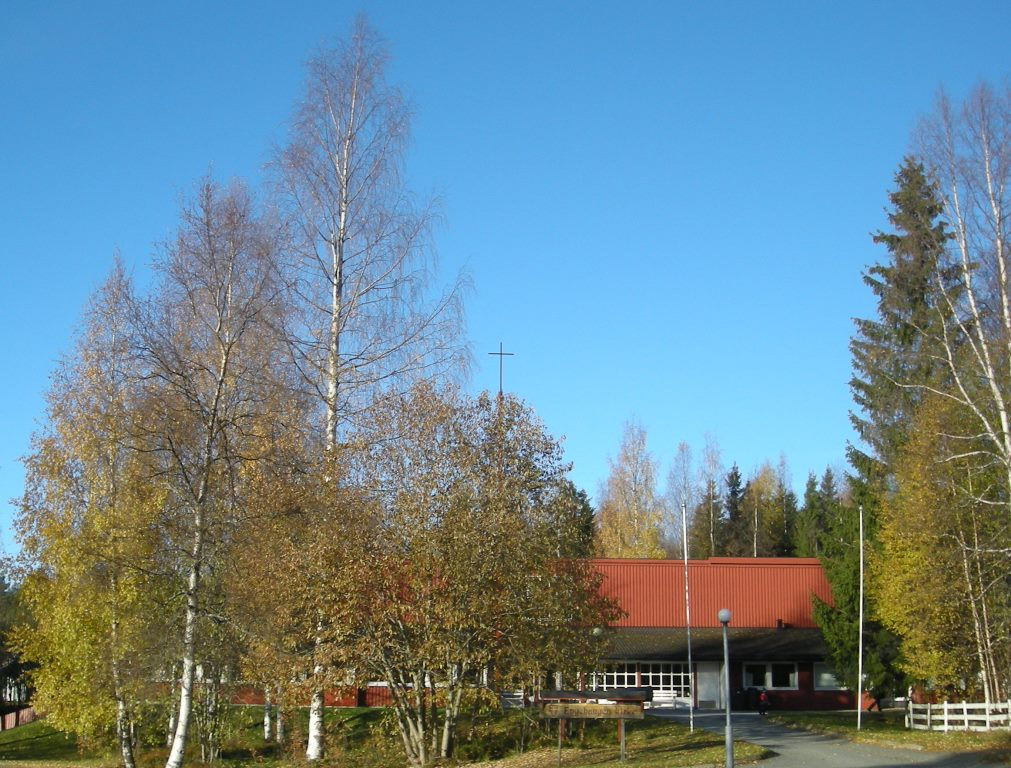
- View of the church
- Engehaugen Church
- 60°46′25″N 10°40′10″E
- Location: Gjøvik Municipality, Innlandet
- Country: Norway
- Denomination: Church of Norway
- Previous denomination: Catholic Church
- Churchmanship: Evangelical Lutheran

History
- Status: Parish church
- Founded: 1994
- Consecrated: 1994

Architecture
- Functional status: Active
- Architect: Jan Arne Frydenlund
- Architectural type: Fan-shaped
- Completed: 1985 (41 years ago)

Specifications
- Capacity: 156
- Materials: Wood

Administration
- Diocese: Hamar bispedømme
- Deanery: Toten prosti
- Parish: Engehaugen

Engehaugen Church (Norwegian: Engehaugen kirke) is a parish church of the Church of Norway in Gjøvik Municipality in Innlandet county, Norway. It is located in the town of Gjøvik. It is the church for the Engehaugen parish which is part of the Toten prosti (deanery) in the Diocese of Hamar. The red, wooden church was built in a fan-shaped design in 1985 using plans drawn up by the architect Jan Arne Frydenlund. The church seats about 156 people.

== History ==
The building was first built in 1985 as a facility for people who are developmentally disabled. During the 1990s, this program was discontinued and the building became available. In 1994, the parish purchased the building and converted it into a church. The gymnasium was converted into the nave. The church was consecrated by Bishop Rosemarie Köhn in 1994.

== See also ==
- List of churches in Hamar
