= Biri Municipality =

Former municipality in Oppland, Norway

Biri Municipality Biri herred
- Former municipality
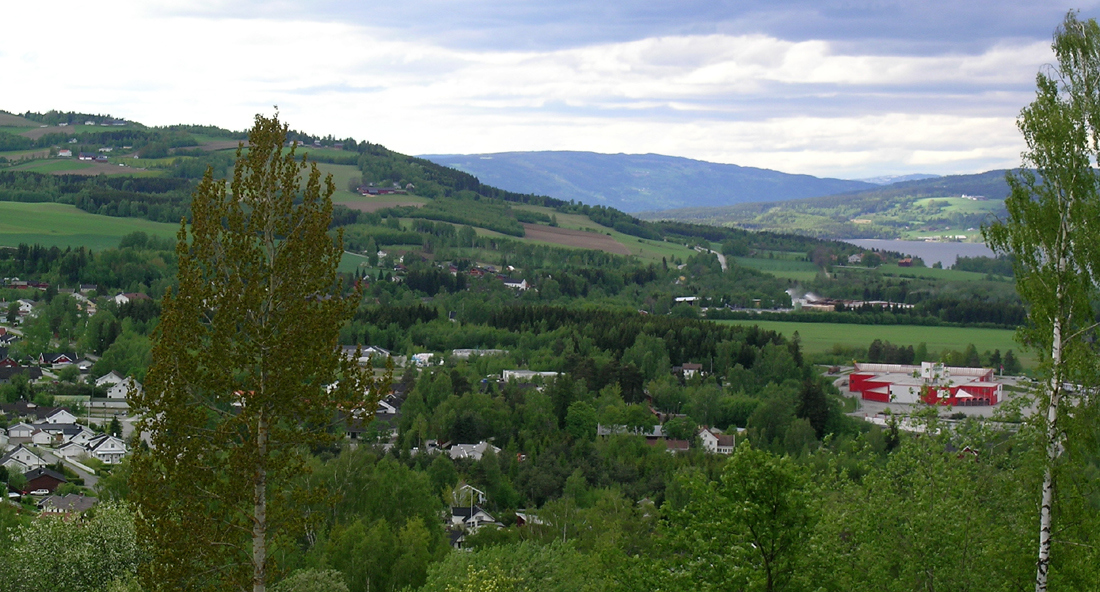
- View of the village of Biri

- Oppland within Norway

- Biri within Oppland
- Coordinates: 60°57′20″N 10°36′41″E
- Country: Norway
- County: Oppland
- District: Vestoppland
- Established: 1 Jan 1838
  - Created as: Formannskapsdistrikt
- Disestablished: 1 Jan 1964
  - Succeeded by: Gjøvik Municipality
- Administrative centre: Biri

Government
  - Mayor (1952–1963): Nils Røstadstuen (Ap)

Area (upon dissolution)
  - Total: 186.3 km^{2} (71.9 sq mi)
  - Rank: #388 in Norway
- Highest elevation: 807 m (2,648 ft)

Population (1963)
  - Total: 3,267
  - Rank: #277 in Norway
  - Density: 17.5/km^{2} (45/sq mi)
  - Change (10 years): ▼ −0.8%
- Demonym: Biring

Official language
  - Norwegian form: Neutral
- Time zone: UTC+01:00 (CET)
  - Summer (DST): UTC+02:00 (CEST)
- ISO 3166 code: NO-0525

Biri is a former municipality in the old Oppland county, Norway. The 186-square-kilometre (72 sq mi) municipality existed from 1838 until its dissolution in 1964. The area is now part of Gjøvik Municipality in the traditional district of Vestoppland. The administrative centre was the village of Biri. Other villages in the municipality included Biri Øverbygd and Biristrand.

Prior to its dissolution in 1964, the 186.3-square-kilometre (71.9 sq mi) municipality was the 388th largest by area out of the 689 municipalities in Norway. Biri Municipality was the 277th most populous municipality in Norway with a population of about 3,267. The municipality's population density was 17.5 inhabitants per square kilometre (45/sq mi) and its population had decreased by 0.8% over the previous 10-year period.

== General information ==
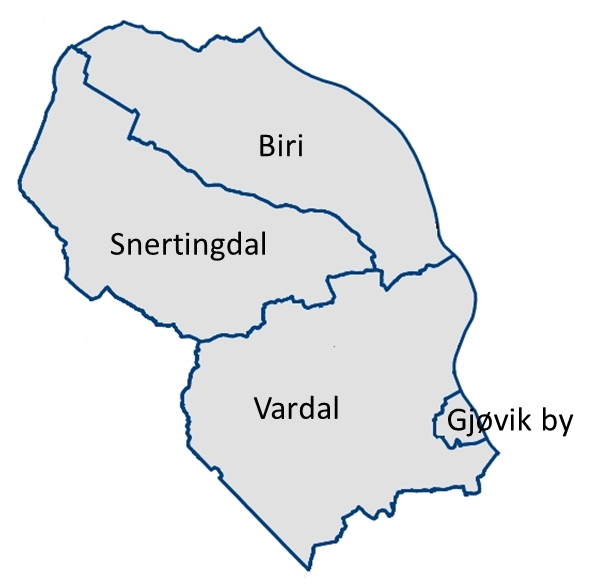
Map of the Biri area before 1964

The parish of Biri was established as a municipality on 1 January 1838 (see formannskapsdistrikt law). On 1 January 1910, Biri Municipality was divided in two. The western part (population: 2,028) became Snertingdal Municipality and the eastern part (population: 2,815) continued as Biri Municipality.

During the 1960s there were many municipal mergers across Norway due to the work of the Schei Committee. On 1 January 1964, the following areas were merged to form a new, larger Gjøvik Municipality with 23,608 residents:

- the town of Gjøvik (population: 8,251)
- Biri Municipality (population: 3,274)
- Snertingdal Municipality (population: 2,471)
- most of Vardal Municipality (population: (9,612)

=== Name ===
The municipality (originally the parish) is named after the old Biri farm (Old Norse: Biríð) since the first Biri Church was built there. The name is presumably very old and its meaning is uncertain. One possibility is that the Old Norse name is derived from the word berhíð which means "bear den".

=== Churches ===
The Church of Norway had one parish (sokn) within Biri Municipality. At the time of the municipal dissolution, it was part of the Biri prestegjeld and the Toten prosti (deanery) in the Diocese of Hamar.

Churches in Biri Municipality
Parish (sokn)	Church name	Location of the church	Year built
Biri	Biri Church	Biri	1777

== Geography ==
Fåberg Municipality was located to the north, Ringsaker Municipality (in Hedmark county) was located to the east, Nes Municipality (also in Hedmark county) was located to the southeast, Vardal Municipality was located to the south, Snertingdal Municipality was located to the west, and Torpa Municipality was located to the northwest. The highest point in the municipality was the 807-metre (2,648 ft) tall mountain Åsgardshaugen, located on the border with Snertingdal Municipality.

== Government ==
While it existed, Biri Municipality was responsible for primary education (through 10th grade), outpatient health services, senior citizen services, welfare and other social services, zoning, economic development, and municipal roads and utilities. The municipality was governed by a municipal council of directly elected representatives. The mayor was indirectly elected by a vote of the municipal council. The municipality was under the jurisdiction of the Eidsivating Court of Appeal.

=== Municipal council ===
The municipal council (Herredsstyre) of Biri Municipality was made up of 21 representatives that were elected to four-year terms. The tables below show the historical composition of the council by political party.

Biri herredsstyre 1959–1963
Party name (in Norwegian)	Number of representatives
Labour Party (Arbeiderpartiet)	13
Christian Democratic Party (Kristelig Folkeparti)	1
Centre Party (Senterpartiet)	6
Liberal Party (Venstre)	1
Total number of members:	21
Note: On 1 January 1964, Biri Municipality became part of Gjøvik Municipality.

Biri herredsstyre 1955–1959
Party name (in Norwegian)	Number of representatives
Labour Party (Arbeiderpartiet)	12
Christian Democratic Party (Kristelig Folkeparti)	1
Farmers' Party (Bondepartiet)	6
Liberal Party (Venstre)	2
Total number of members:	21

Biri herredsstyre 1951–1955
Party name (in Norwegian)	Number of representatives
Labour Party (Arbeiderpartiet)	12
Christian Democratic Party (Kristelig Folkeparti)	1
Farmers' Party (Bondepartiet)	6
Liberal Party (Venstre)	1
Total number of members:	20

Biri herredsstyre 1947–1951
Party name (in Norwegian)	Number of representatives
Labour Party (Arbeiderpartiet)	10
Christian Democratic Party (Kristelig Folkeparti)	2
Farmers' Party (Bondepartiet)	6
Liberal Party (Venstre)	2
Total number of members:	20

Biri herredsstyre 1945–1947
Party name (in Norwegian)	Number of representatives
Labour Party (Arbeiderpartiet)	12
Christian Democratic Party (Kristelig Folkeparti)	2
Farmers' Party (Bondepartiet)	4
Joint list of the Liberal Party (Venstre) and the Radical People's Party (Radikale Folkepartiet)	2
Total number of members:	20

Biri herredsstyre 1937–1941*
Party name (in Norwegian)	Number of representatives
Labour Party (Arbeiderpartiet)	10
Farmers' Party (Bondepartiet)	7
Joint list of the Liberal Party (Venstre) and the Radical People's Party (Radikale Folkepartiet)	3
Total number of members:	20
Note: Due to the German occupation of Norway during World War II, no elections were held for new municipal councils until after the war ended in 1945.

=== Mayors ===
The mayor (Norwegian: ordfører) of Biri Municipality was the political leader of the municipality and the chairperson of the municipal council. The following people have held this position:

- 1838–1843: Christian Semb
- 1844–1845: Nils Larsen Melby
- 1846–1847: Nils Johan Hagerup
- 1848–1849: Anders Lysgaard, Jr.
- 1850–1851: Nils Larsen Melby
- 1852–1855: Anders Lysgaard, Jr.
- 1856–1857: Johannes Alseth
- 1858–1859: Halvor Olsen
- 1860–1867: Iver Lier
- 1868–1871: Nils Berg
- 1872–1873: Johannes Alseth
- 1874–1875: Even Nøss
- 1876–1881: Mathias Larsen Bratberg
- 1882–1883: Anton Skulhus
- 1890–1893: Julius Bjørnstad
- 1894–1895: Anton Skulhus
- 1896–1904: Iver Fliflet
- 1905–1907: Ole E. Huskelhus
- 1908–1910: Kristian Oudenstad (LL)
- 1911–1913: Julius Bjørnstad
- 1914–1931: Hagbart Wiklund (AD)
- 1931–1934: Einar Sigstad (Bp)
- 1934–1941: Henrik Eilert Brekke (Ap)
- 1941–1941: Harald Bratberg (NS)
- 1941–1945: Einar Sigstad (NS)
- 1945–1951: Henrik Eilert Brekke (Ap)
- 1952–1963: Nils Røstadstuen (Ap)

== See also ==
- List of former municipalities of Norway
