= Ole Jacob Skattum =

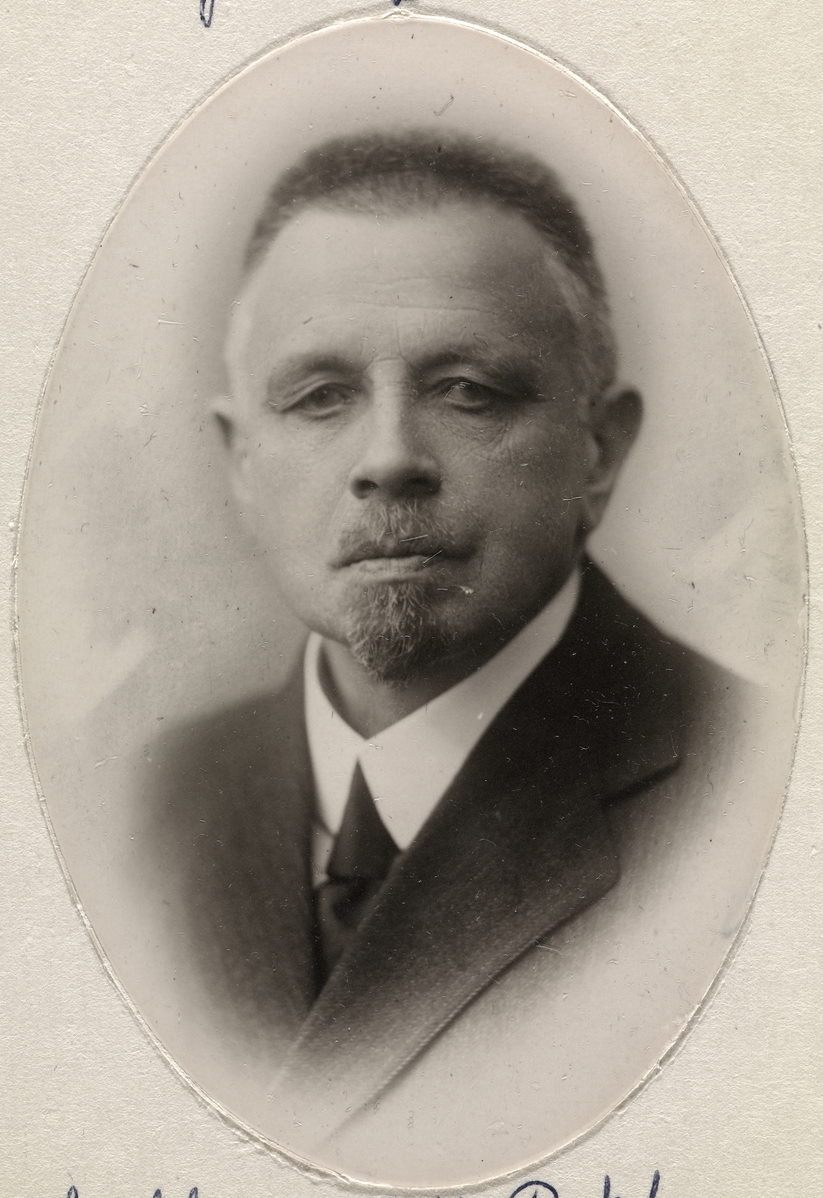

Ole Jacob Skattum (8 June 1862 – 15 January 1930) was a Norwegian geographer, educator and politician for the Liberal Left Party.

== Biography ==
Skattum was born in Kristiania as a son of merchant Hans Skattum and Mathilde Amalie Petersen. In 1899, he married Agnes Bryhn, daughter of a district physician.

He finished his secondary education in 1880 with the highest mark, laudabilis præ ceteris. He enrolled in higher education and took the cand.mag. degree at the Royal Frederick University in 1887, and the dr.philos. degree in geography in 1907, with the thesis Ofir-studier. He was a board member of the Norwegian Geographical Society from 1907, was promoted to vice chairman in 1912 and chairman in 1921. He was a pioneer in studies of the Arctic and Antarctic, issuing Sydpolforskning in 1912 and Videnskapelige expeditioner (Norge 1814–1914) in 1914 together with W. C. Brøgger. He held a presentation on Spitsbergen, early in its kind, at the 10th International Congress on Geography in 1913. He also contributed to Vore høvdinger, Aschehougs konversationsleksikon and Norsk biografisk leksikon.

He was a schoolteacher in Latin, history and geography in Kristiania from 1884, at the schools Aars og Voss, Nissen, Olaf Berg, Nickelsen and Mrs. Fredriksen. In 1893 he together with four colleagues established Vestheim School. Skattum was named on the school's board. In 1918 the school was taken over by the municipality. Skattum was named as headmaster in 1920. He held this position until his death.

In politics he chaired Aker Liberal Left Party from 1916 to 1921 and was first elected to Aker municipal council in 1917. He was also a board member of the Riksmål Society from 1911 to 1914 and a supervisory council member of Nationaltheatret, Norske Liv and Christiania Sparebank. He died from heart failure in January 1930.
