= Ny Dag (Norwegian newspaper) =

Defunct Norwegian newspaper

Ny Dag ("New Day") was a Norwegian newspaper, published in Gjøvik in Oppland county.

Ny Dag was started in June 1913 as a Labour Party newspaper. It had no editor-in-chief right from the start, but an editorial committee. Eivind Reiersen was the editor from 1916 to 1919. From 1919 it had the marked editor-in-chief, Niels Ødegaard.

When the Communist Party broke away from the Labour Party in 1923, Ny Dag followed the communists. It was their organ for Oppland south of Lillehammer. It was published daily, but this was cut to three times a week from late 1924. The editor-in-chief Ødegaard initially joined the Communists and remained in Ny Dag. However, after the 1924 Norwegian parliamentary election he got cold feet, left Ny Dag and rejoined the Labour Party. Reiersen returned as editor.

Ny Dag came with its last issue on 29 December 1924. It had become indebted, and finally disappeared in 1925.
