= Nykirke (Innlandet) =

Church in Innlandet, Norway

- New Church
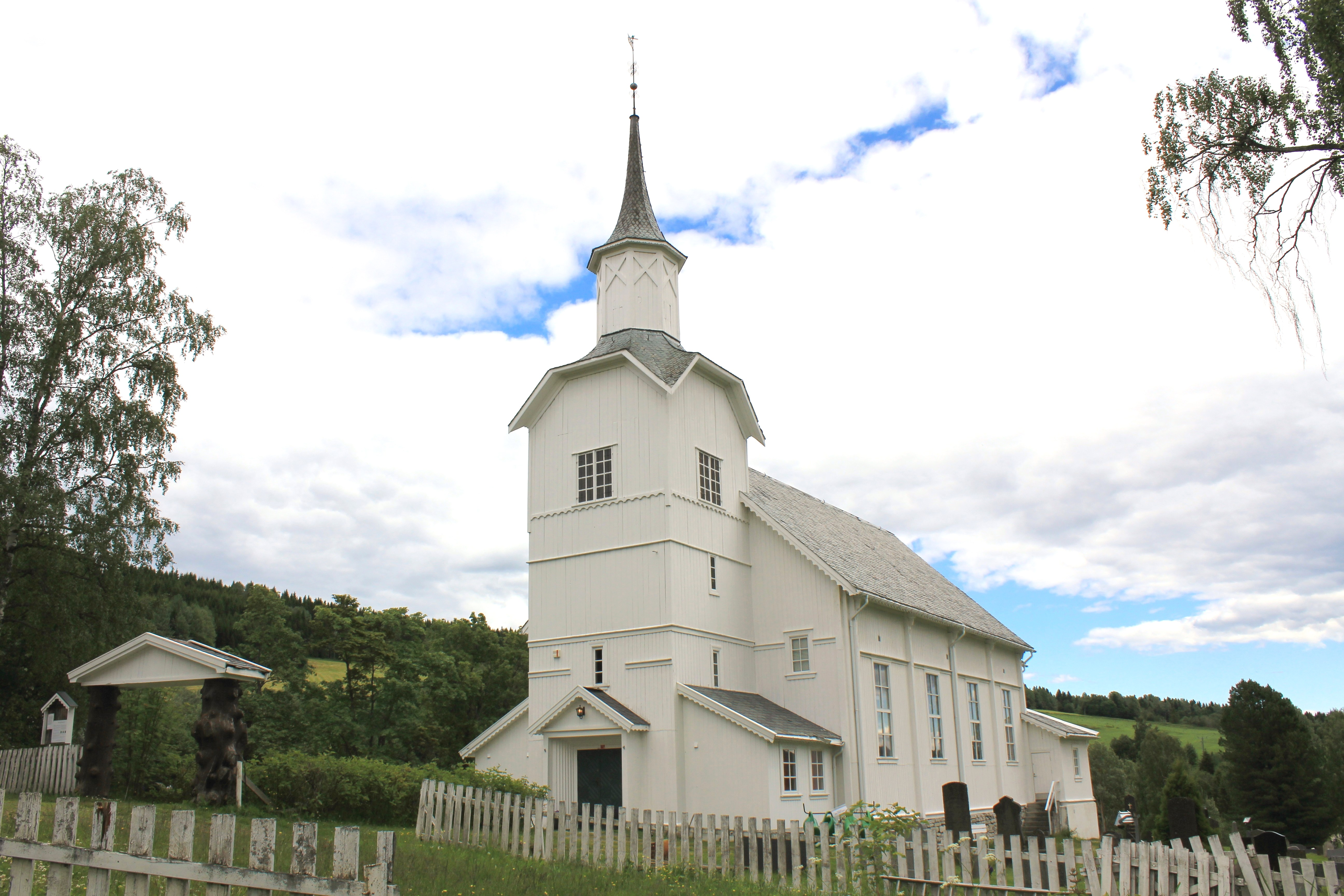
- View of the church
- Nykirke
- 60°53′52″N 10°20′20″E
- Location: Gjøvik Municipality, Innlandet
- Country: Norway
- Denomination: Church of Norway
- Previous denomination: Catholic Church
- Churchmanship: Evangelical Lutheran

History
- Status: Parish church
- Founded: 14th century
- Consecrated: 22 October 1872

Architecture
- Functional status: Active
- Architect: Jacob Wilhelm Nordan
- Architectural type: Long church
- Completed: 1872 (154 years ago)

Specifications
- Capacity: 360
- Materials: Wood

Administration
- Diocese: Hamar bispedømme
- Deanery: Toten prosti
- Parish: Snertingdal
- Norwegian Cultural Heritage Site
- Type: Church
- Status: Protected
- ID: 85183

Nykirke (lit. 'New Church') is a parish church of the Church of Norway in Gjøvik Municipality in Innlandet county, Norway. It is located in the village of Ålset in the Snertingdalen valley. It is one of the churches for the Snertingdal parish which is part of the Toten prosti (deanery) in the Diocese of Hamar. The white, wooden church was built in a long church design in 1872 using plans drawn up by the architect Jacob Wilhelm Nordan. The church seats about 360 people.

== History ==
The earliest existing historical records of the church date back to the year 1669, but that was not the year that the church was built. The first church in Snertingdalen was a small wooden stave church that was possibly built in the 14th century by the local villagers. This church was located at Kirkerud, about 1.2 kilometres (0.75 mi) to the southeast of the present church site. It is possible that this church fell out of use after the Black Death in Norway since it does not show up in records until the 1600s when it was old and in need of replacement. In 1694, the local villagers requested permission to tear down the old church and to replace it with a new building on the same site. Again in 1700, they petitioned again for permission and this time it was granted. In 1703, the new church was completed and consecrated by the Bishop Hans Munch. The new building was a timber-framed long church. The parish priest held about 3-4 services at this church each year. Throughout the 1700s, the church was referred to by various names: Christi Nye Kirke, Gavekirken, Nykirke, Snertingdalen øvre Kirke (meaning "Christ New Church", "Gift Church", "New Church", or "upper Snertingdalen Church").

In 1862, the rector at the church reported that the church was in very poor condition and very small for the congregation. Soon after, planning began for a new church. It was decided to build the replacement church about 1.2 kilometres (0.75 mi) to the northwest of the old church site. The new church was designed by Jacob Wilhelm Nordan. It was a wooden long church that was built in 1871–1872. The new church was consecrated on 22 October 1872 and the old church was torn down sometime afterwards. The new church was named Nykirke which translates to "new church".

== Media gallery ==
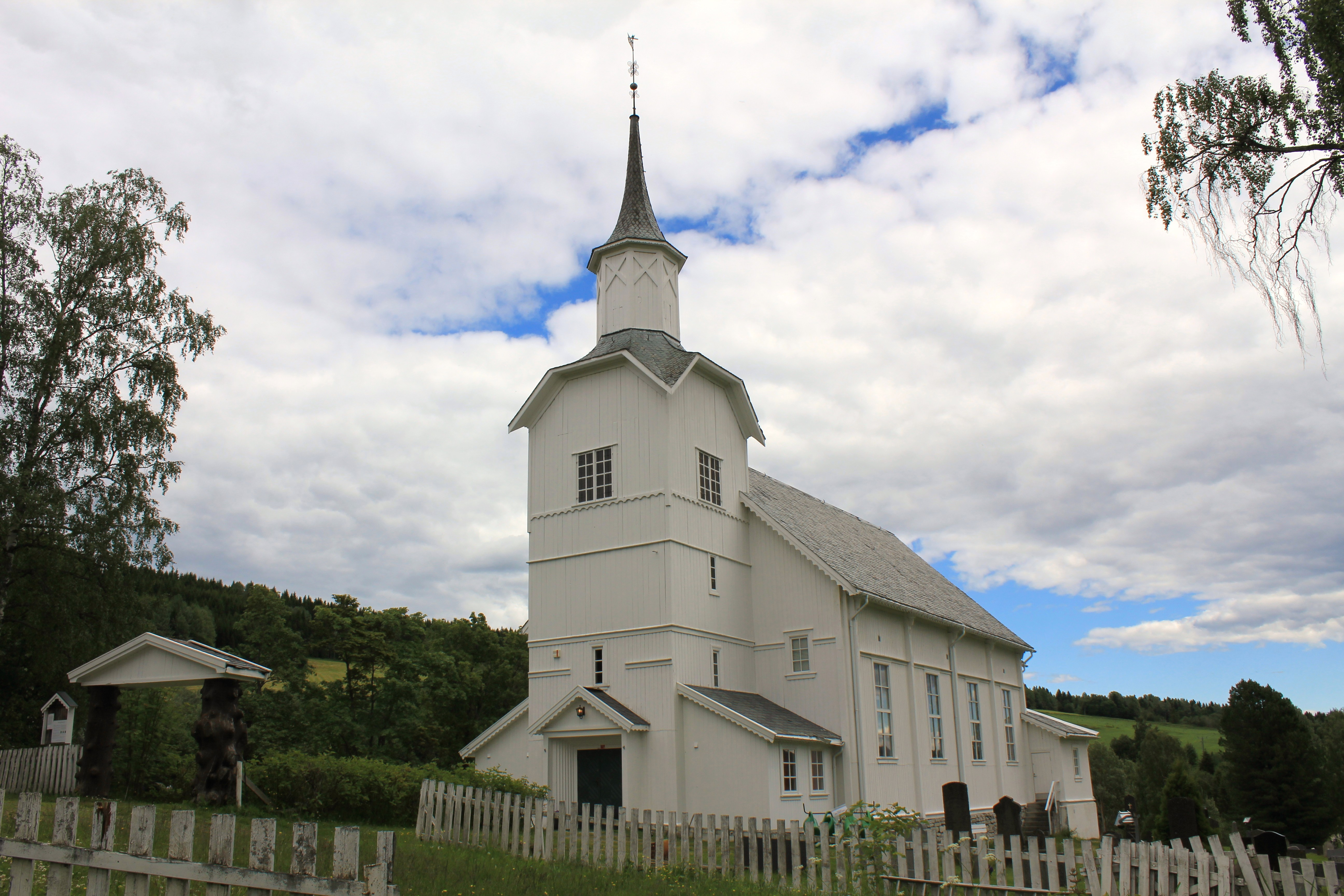

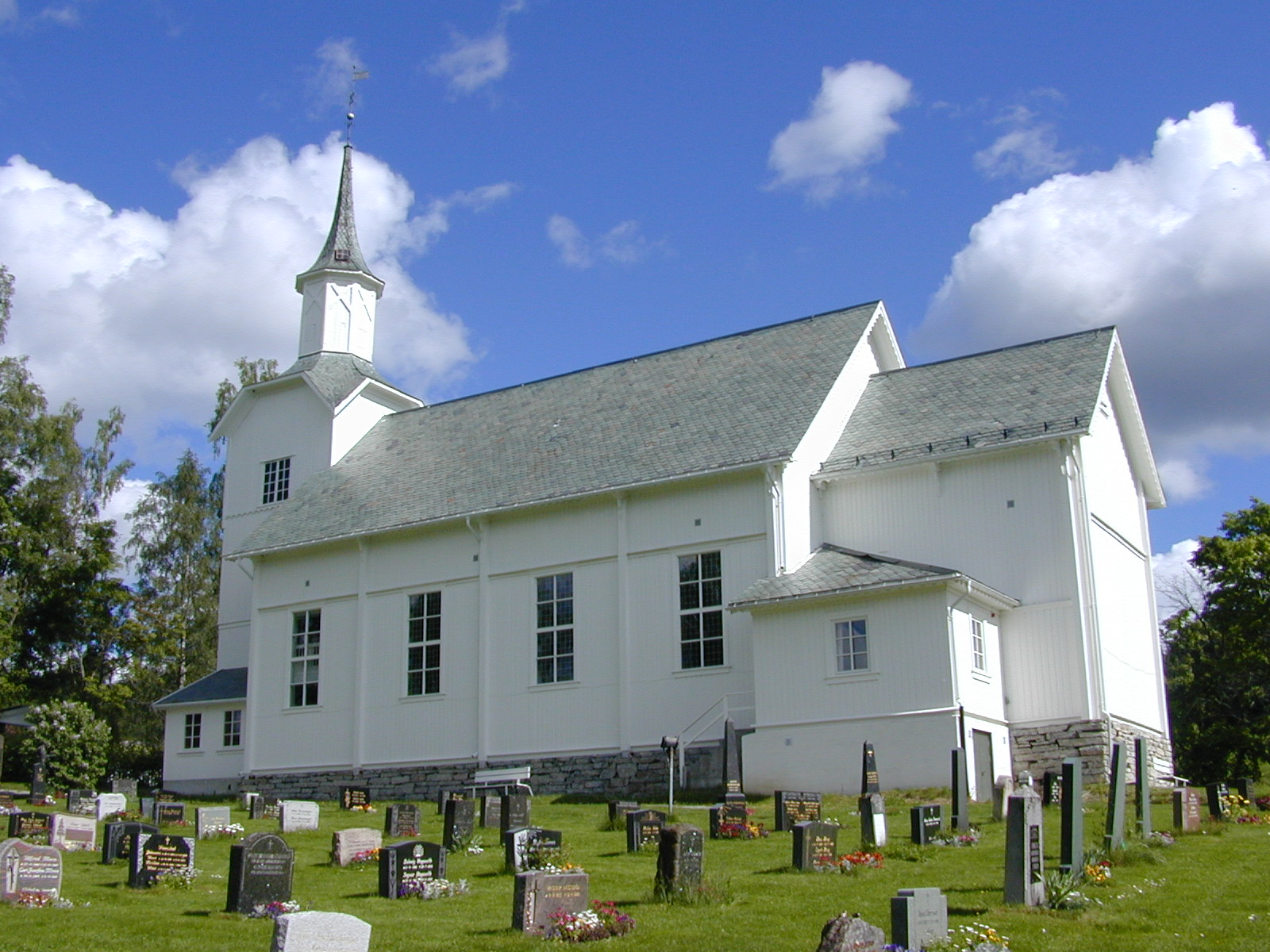

== See also ==
- List of churches in Hamar
