= Seegård Church =

Church in Innlandet, Norway

- Seegård kirke
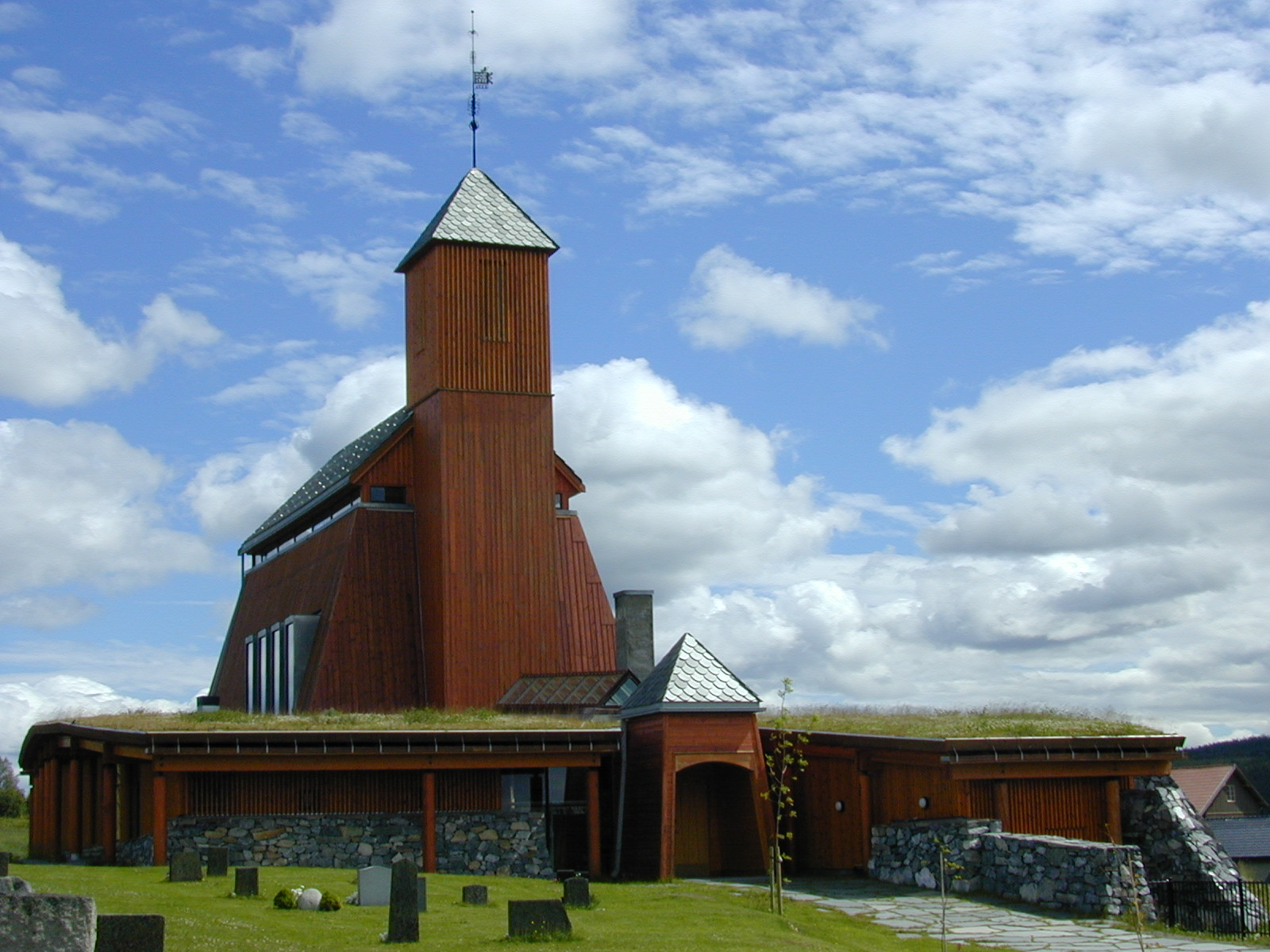
- View of the church
- Seegård Church
- 60°52′49″N 10°27′45″E
- Location: Gjøvik Municipality, Innlandet
- Country: Norway
- Denomination: Church of Norway
- Churchmanship: Evangelical Lutheran

History
- Status: Parish church
- Founded: 14th century
- Consecrated: 1997
- Events: 1994: Fire

Architecture
- Functional status: Active
- Architect: Arne Thorsrud
- Architectural type: Rectangular
- Completed: 1997 (29 years ago)

Specifications
- Capacity: 250
- Materials: Wood

Administration
- Diocese: Hamar bispedømme
- Deanery: Toten prosti
- Parish: Snertingdal
- Norwegian Cultural Heritage Site
- Type: Church
- Status: Not protected
- ID: 85407

Seegård Church (Norwegian: Seegård kirke) is a parish church of the Church of Norway in Gjøvik Municipality in Innlandet county, Norway. It is located in the village of Seegård. It is one of the churches for the Snertingdal parish which is part of the Toten prosti (deanery) in the Diocese of Hamar. The brown, wooden church was built in a rectangular design in 1997 using plans drawn up by the architect Arne Thorsrud. The church seats about 250 people.

== History ==
The earliest existing historical records of the church date back to the year 1575, but the church was not built that year. The first church in Seegård was a wooden stave church that was possibly built during the 14th century. This church was built on a site about 100 metres (330 ft) to the northwest of the present church building. In 1617, the old choir torn down and a new choir was built on the same site. In 1652, a sacristy was added on to the building.

In 1781, the old church was torn down and a new wooden church was built with a cruciform floor plan on a new site about 100 metres (330 ft) to the southeast of the older church site. The new church was designed by Amund Nilsen Gloppe. This new building was consecrated in 1782. This church burned down on Palm Sunday (27 March) 1994, destroying the church and none of the historic interior furnishings were saved. Soon after, the parish began planning for a new church building on the same site. The new church was designed by Arne Thorsrud and consecrated in 1997. The new church includes the main nave and chancel room, plus it also has a church hall, some smaller rooms, and a kitchen.

== Media gallery ==
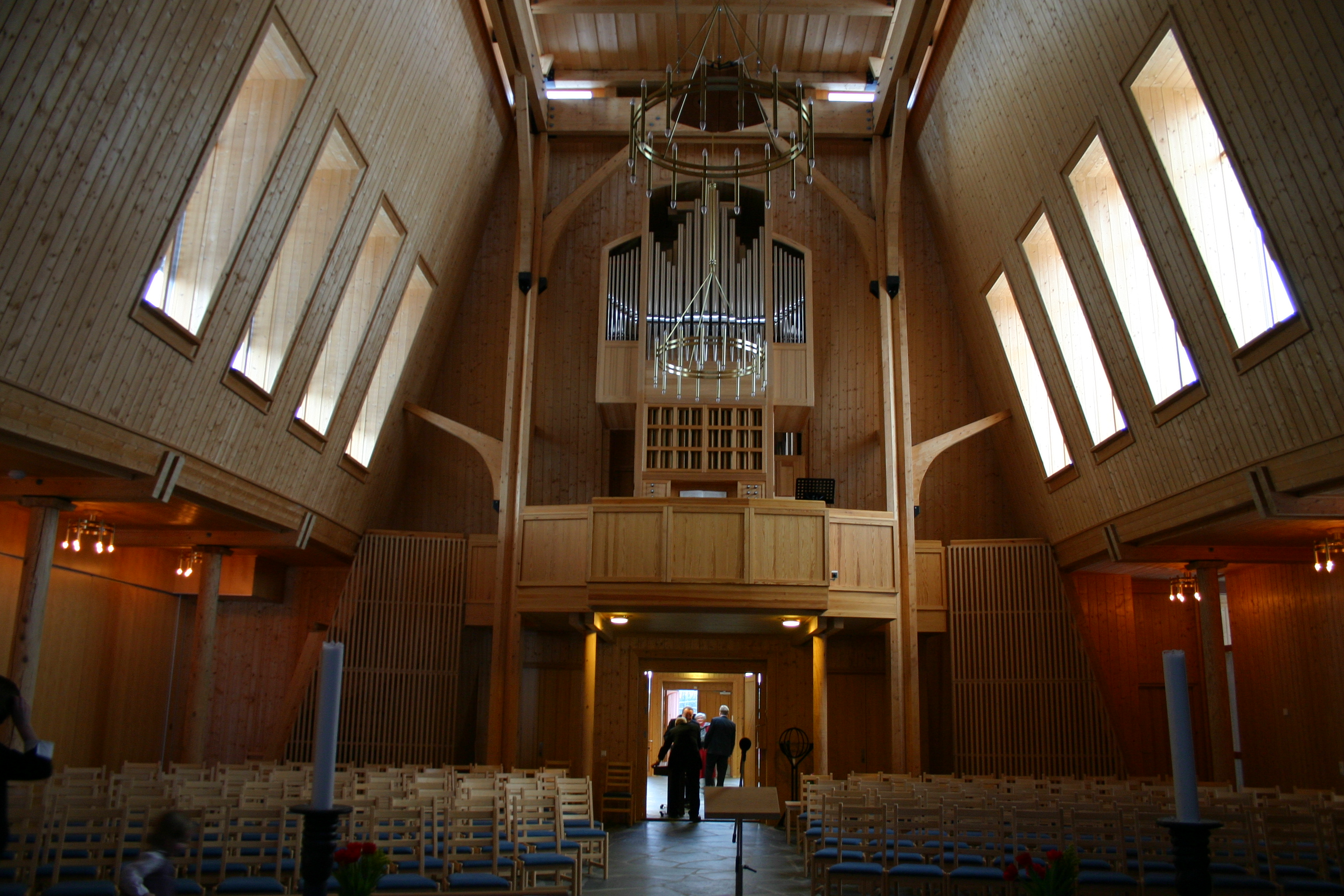

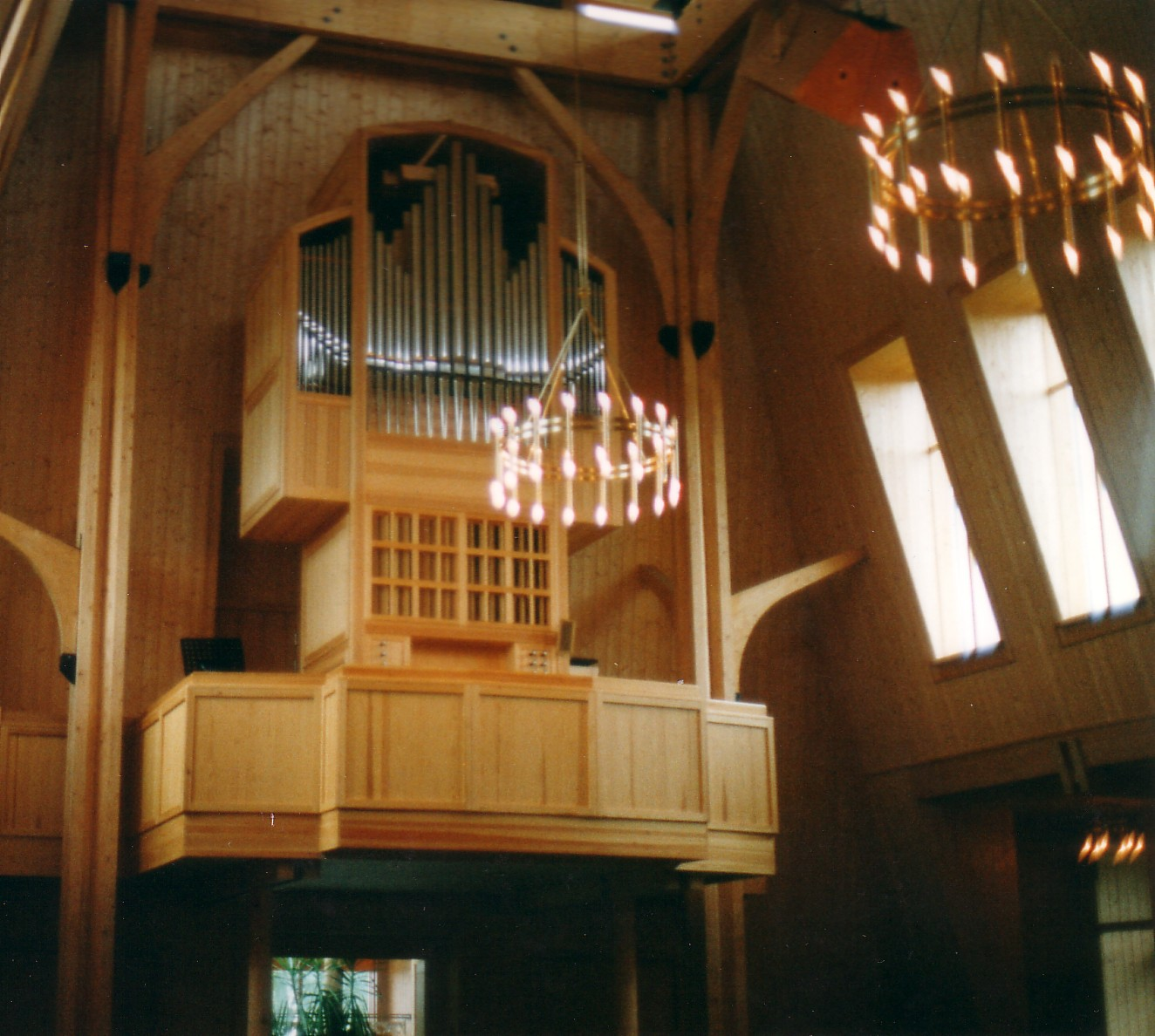

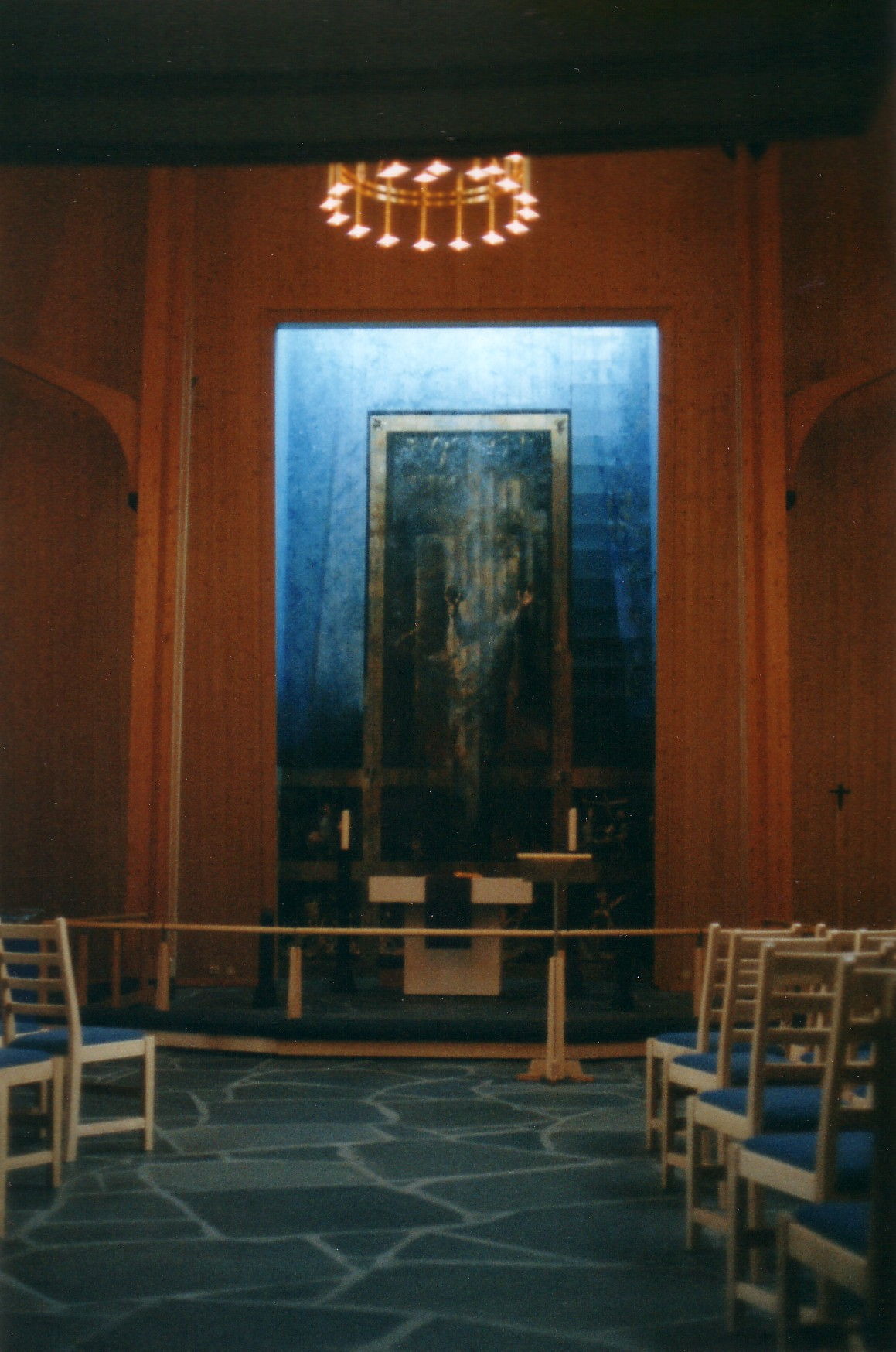

== See also ==
- List of churches in Hamar
