= Vestoppland =

Traditional district in Innlandet, Norway

Coordinates: 61.015553°N 9.458599°E

Vestoppland is a traditional district in Innlandet, Norway.

The name, Western Uplands, stems from a time when the district was the western part of the Uplands. It now consists of the districts Land, Hadeland, Toten and Gjøvik (which itself consists of Gjøvik city and Tverrdalene).

Vestoppland Police District consists of the district Vestoppland in addition to Valdres.
