= Gjøvik (town) =

Town in Innlandet, Norway

- Town/City
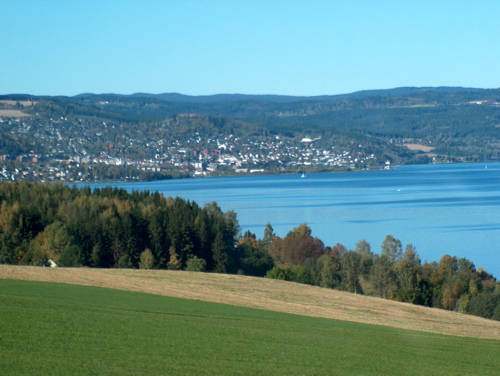
- View of the town
- Interactive map of Gjøvik
- Location within Innlandet Location within Norway
- Coordinates: 60.79574°N 10.69155°E
- Country: Norway
- Region: Eastern Norway
- County: Innlandet
- District: Vestoppland
- Municipality: Gjøvik Municipality
- Established as
- Kjøpstad: 1 Jan 1861

Area
  - Total: 20.25 km^{2} (7.82 sq mi)
- Elevation: 129 m (423 ft)

Population (2024)
  - Total: 28,801
  - Density: 1,422/km^{2} (3,680/sq mi)
- Demonym(s): Gjøvikensar; Gjøvikenser
- Time zone: UTC+01:00 (CET)
  - Summer (DST): UTC+02:00 (CEST)
- Post Code: 2821 Gjøvik

Gjøvik (Gjøvik) is a town in Gjøvik Municipality in Innlandet county, Norway. The town is the administrative centre of Gjøvik Municipality. It is located on the western shore of the large lake Mjøsa, about 45 kilometres (28 mi) south of the town of Lillehammer and about 20 kilometres (12 mi) west (across the lake) from the town of Hamar.

The 20.25-square-kilometre (5,000-acre) town has a population (2024) of 28,801 and a population density of 1,422 inhabitants per square kilometre (3,680/sq mi). This makes it the third largest town in Innlandet county (after Hamar and Lillehammer).

The town is located along the river Hunnselva where the river flows into the lake Mjøsa. The town is traditionally an industrial town with several large companies based there including O. Mustad & Son. In 1902, the Gjøvikbanen railway line was built, connecting the town to the national capital, Oslo, which is about 120 kilometres (75 mi) to the south. Gjøvik Church is located in the town. The Gjøvik Olympic Cavern Hall is the world's largest sporting facility that is built into the side of a mountain. It was first built to be used as part of the 1994 Winter Olympics in nearby Lillehammer.

== History ==
Historically, the village of Gjøvik was part of the parish and municipality of Vardal. On 1 January 1861, the village was granted kjøpstad (town) status. At that time, the village was separated from Vardal Municipality to form a separate municipality given its new status as a town. Initially, the new town of Gjøvik had 626 residents. On 1 July 1921, a part of Vardal Municipality located just outside the town of Gjøvik (population: 723) was annexed into the town. Again, on 1 January 1955, another part of Vardal Municipality (population: 1,372) was transferred to the town. During the 1960s, there were many municipal mergers across Norway due to the work of the Schei Committee. On 1 January 1964, Biri Municipality, Snertingdal Municipality, and Vardal Municipality were all merged with the town to form the new, larger Gjøvik Municipality.

=== Etymology ===
The town is named after the old Gjøvik farm (Old Norse: Djúpvík). The first element is djúpr which means "deep" and the second element is vík which means "inlet".

== See also ==
- List of towns and cities in Norway
