= Bøverbru =

Village in Vestre Toten Municipality, Norway

- Village
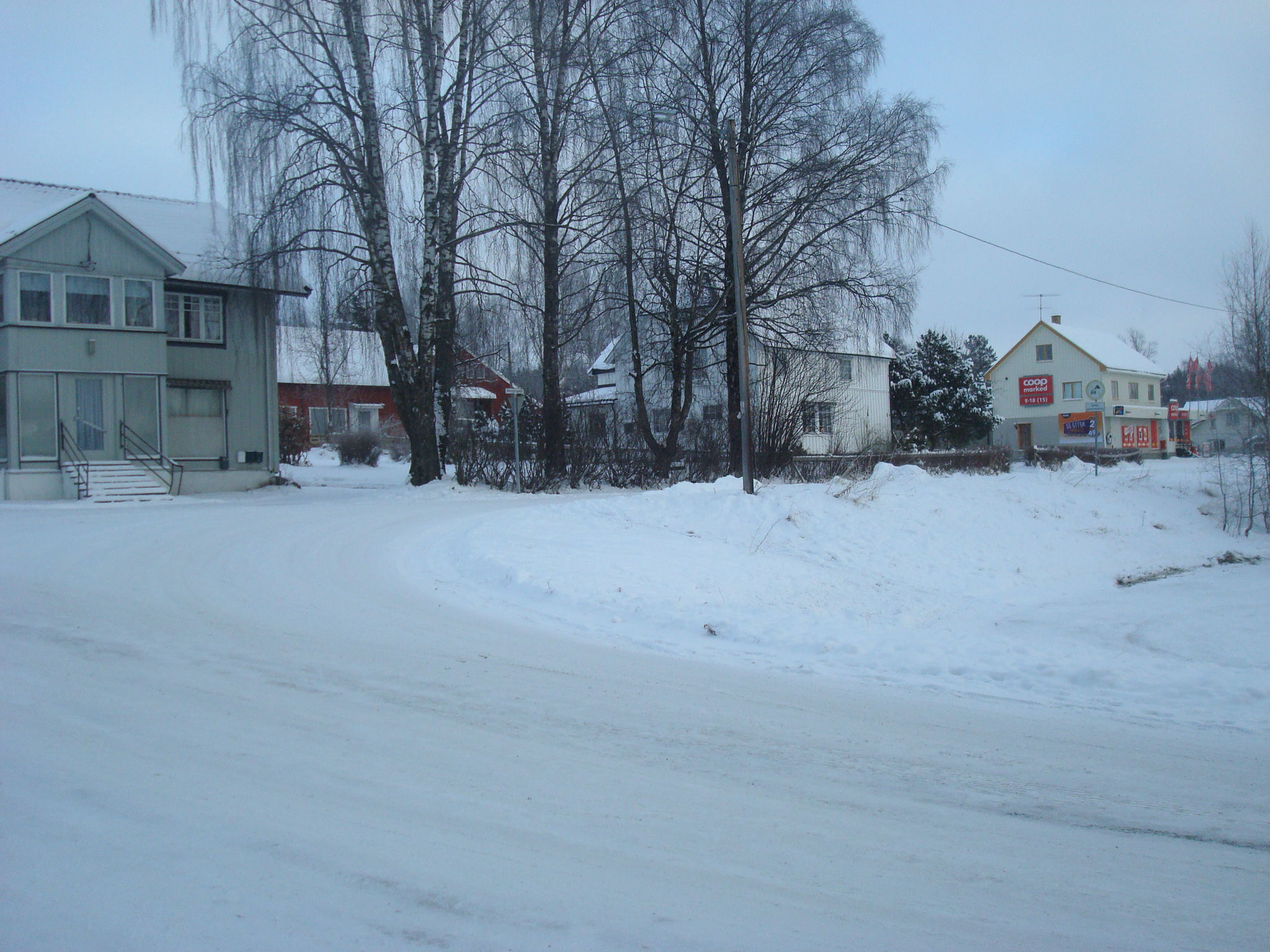
- View of the village
- Interactive map of Bøverbru
- Location within Innlandet Location within Norway
- Coordinates: 60.66514°N 10.67322°E
- Country: Norway
- Region: Eastern Norway
- County: Innlandet
- District: Toten
- Municipality: Vestre Toten Municipality

Area
  - Total: 0.74 km^{2} (0.29 sq mi)
- Elevation: 363 m (1,191 ft)

Population (2024)
  - Total: 744
  - Density: 1,005/km^{2} (2,600/sq mi)
- Time zone: UTC+01:00 (CET)
  - Summer (DST): UTC+02:00 (CEST)
- Post Code: 2846 Bøverbru

Bøverbru is a village in Vestre Toten Municipality in Innlandet county, Norway. The village is located about 3.5 kilometres (2.2 mi) to the southeast of the village of Reinsvoll and about 4 kilometres (2.5 mi) to the northwest of the village of Kolbu in neighboring Østre Toten Municipality. The village of Eina lies about 6 kilometres (3.7 mi) to the southwest of Bøverbru.

The 0.74-square-kilometre (180-acre) village has a population (2024) of 744 and a population density of 1,005 inhabitants per square kilometre (2,600/sq mi).

"Toten Kjøtt", a local meat producer, and Studio Studio Nyhagen, a music production company are both located in the village. Ås Church is located about 1 kilometre (0.62 mi) to the northeast of the village centre.

== History ==
The settlement grew up around the Bøverbru Station, a railway station along the Skreiabanen railway line starting in 1902. In the same year, Bøverbru was established as a postal address. The name Bøverbru comes from the name "Bøfr-Broen" (an older spelling) which was used for a local bridge over the river Bøvra. This name can be found in documents dating back to the 18th century. In the first part of the 20th century, quarrying and lime burning were important business activities in the Bøverbru area. The railway line to Bøverbru was closed to passenger traffic in 1963 (and freight traffic continued) and it was closed completely in 1987.
