= Eina Municipality =

Former municipality in Oppland, Norway

Eina Municipality Eina herred
- Former municipality
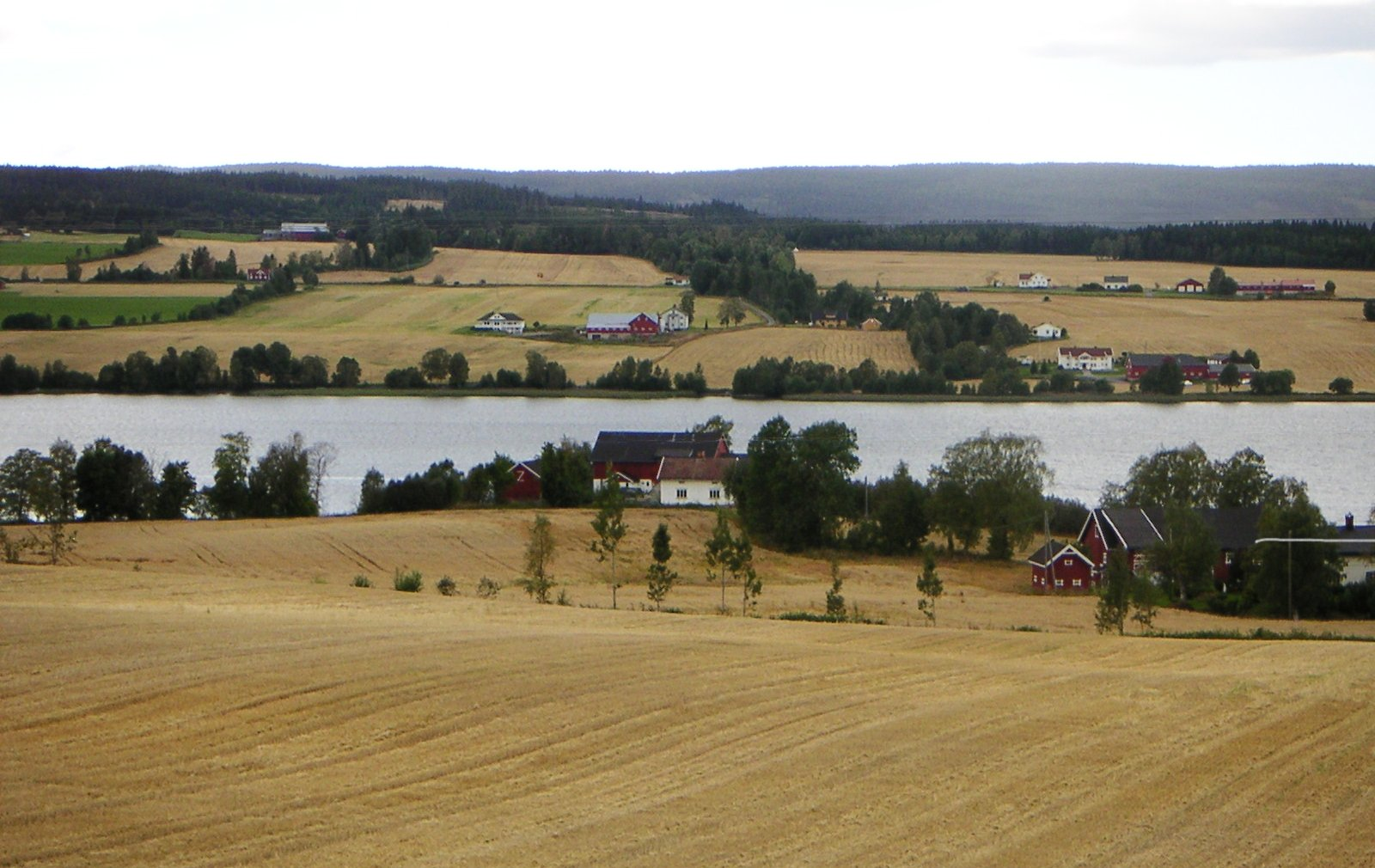
- View of the lake Einavannet and surrounding farmland

- Oppland within Norway

- Eina within Oppland
- Coordinates: 60°37′43″N 10°35′55″E
- Country: Norway
- County: Oppland
- District: Toten
- Established: 1 Jan 1908
  - Preceded by: Vestre Toten Municipality
- Disestablished: 1 Jan 1964
  - Succeeded by: Vestre Toten Municipality
- Administrative centre: Eina

Government
  - Mayor (1960–1963): Paul Hoelsveenq (Sp)

Area (upon dissolution)
  - Total: 104.5 km^{2} (40.3 sq mi)
  - Rank: #510 in Norway
- Highest elevation: 712 m (2,336 ft)

Population (1963)
  - Total: 1,611
  - Rank: #516 in Norway
  - Density: 15.4/km^{2} (40/sq mi)
  - Change (10 years): ▲ +1.6%

Official language
  - Norwegian form: Bokmål
- Time zone: UTC+01:00 (CET)
  - Summer (DST): UTC+02:00 (CEST)
- ISO 3166 code: NO-0530

Eina is a former municipality in the old Oppland county, Norway. The 104.5-square-kilometre (40.3 sq mi) municipality existed from 1908 until its dissolution in 1964. The area is now part of Vestre Toten Municipality in the traditional district of Toten. The administrative centre was the village of Eina.

Prior to its dissolution in 1964, the 104.5-square-kilometre (40.3 sq mi) municipality was the 510th largest by area out of the 689 municipalities in Norway. Eina Municipality was the 516th most populous municipality in Norway with a population of about 1,611. The municipality's population density was 15.4 inhabitants per square kilometre (40/sq mi) and its population had increased by 1.6% over the previous 10-year period.

== General information ==
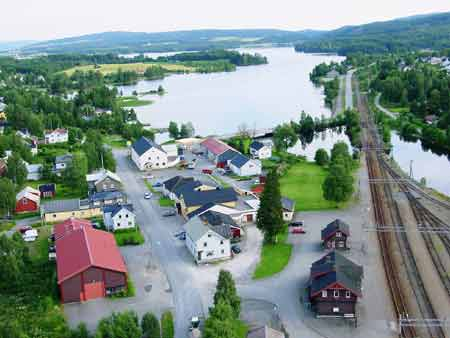
View of Eina

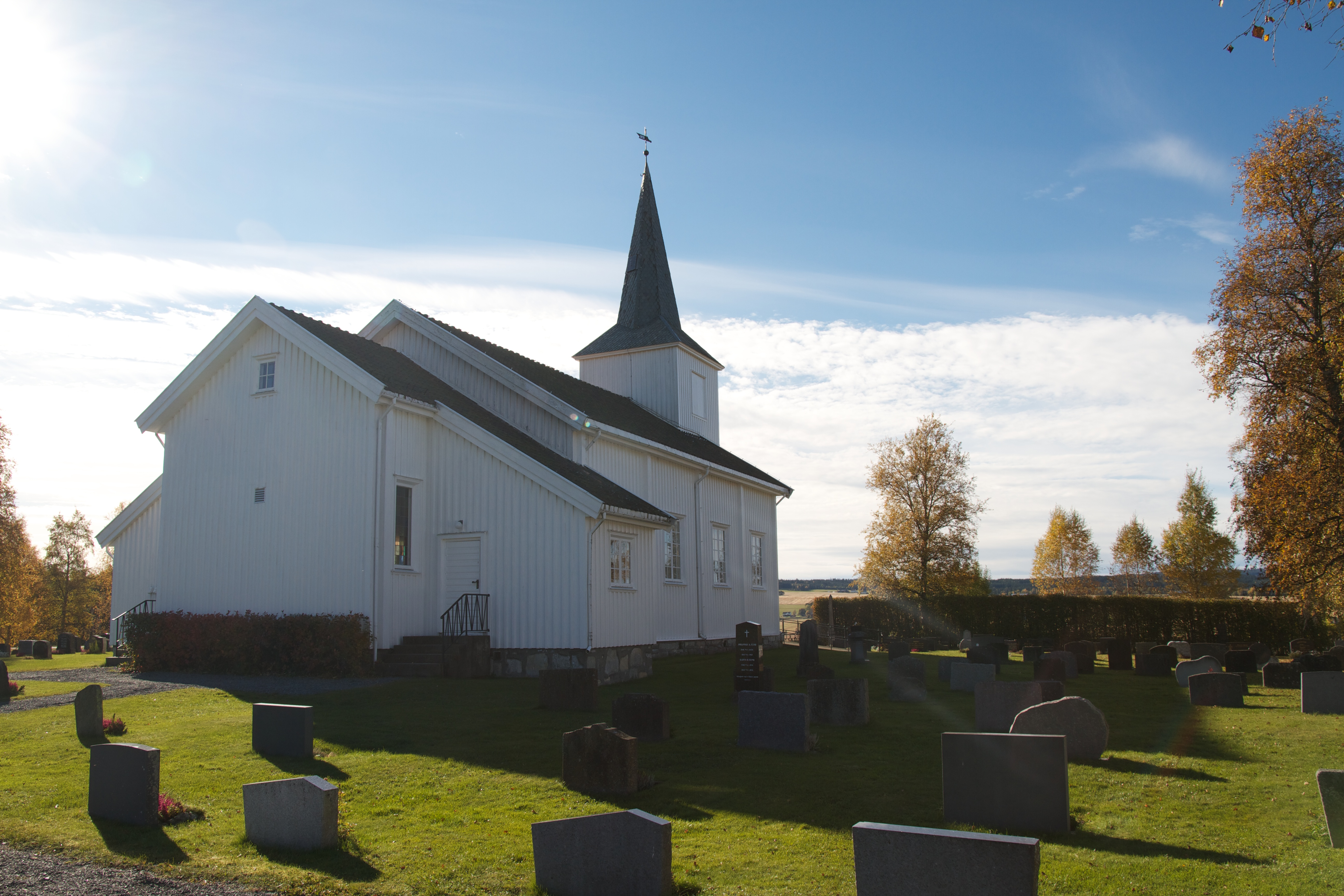
Eina Church

The municipality of Eina was established on 1 January 1908 when the old Vestre Toten Municipality was divided in three. The southwestern part (population: 1,173) became Eina Municipality, the southeastern part (population: 2,412) became Kolbu Municipality, and the northern part (population: 4,027) continued as Vestre Toten Municipality. During the 1960s, there were many municipal mergers across Norway due to the work of the Schei Committee. On 1 January 1964, Eina Municipality (population: 1,591) was merged with Vestre Toten Municipality (population: 9,113) plus the Sørligrenda area of Vardal Municipality (population: 87) and the small area on the south end of the lake Einavatnet (population: 12) from Gran Municipality to form a new, larger Vestre Toten Municipality.

=== Name ===
The municipality (originally the parish) is named after the lake Einavatnet (Old Norse: Eini). The name of the lake is derived from the word einir which means "juniper", likely referring to the vegetation around the lake.

=== Churches ===
The Church of Norway had one parish (sokn) within Eina Municipality. At the time of the municipal dissolution, it was part of the Kolbu prestegjeld and the Toten prosti (deanery) in the Diocese of Hamar.

Churches in Eina Municipality
Parish (sokn)	Church name	Location of the church	Year built
Eina	Eina Church	Eina	1890

== Geography ==
The municipality was located in the southwestern part of Toten. Vestre Toten Municipality was located to the north, Kolbu Municipality was located to the east, Brandbu Municipality was located to the southwest, and Søndre Land Municipality was located to the northwest. The highest point in the municipality was the 712-metre (2,336 ft) tall mountain Glåmhaugen, on the border with Søndre Land Municipality.

== Government ==
While it existed, Eina Municipality was responsible for primary education (through 10th grade), outpatient health services, senior citizen services, welfare and other social services, zoning, economic development, and municipal roads and utilities. The municipality was governed by a municipal council of directly elected representatives. The mayor was indirectly elected by a vote of the municipal council. The municipality was under the jurisdiction of the Eidsivating Court of Appeal.

=== Municipal council ===
The municipal council (Herredsstyre) of Eina Municipality was made up of 13 representatives that were elected to four-year terms. The tables below show the historical composition of the council by political party.

Eina herredsstyre 1959–1963
Party name (in Norwegian)	Number of representatives
Labour Party (Arbeiderpartiet)	5
Christian Democratic Party (Kristelig Folkeparti)	2
Centre Party (Senterpartiet)	6
Total number of members:	13
Note: On 1 January 1964, Eina Municipality became part of Vestre Toten Municipality.

Eina herredsstyre 1955–1959
Party name (in Norwegian)	Number of representatives
Labour Party (Arbeiderpartiet)	5
Communist Party (Kommunistiske Parti)	1
Christian Democratic Party (Kristelig Folkeparti)	2
Farmers' Party (Bondepartiet)	5
Total number of members:	13

Eina herredsstyre 1951–1955
Party name (in Norwegian)	Number of representatives
Labour Party (Arbeiderpartiet)	5
Farmers' Party (Bondepartiet)	6
Liberal Party (Venstre)	1
Total number of members:	12

Eina herredsstyre 1947–1951
Party name (in Norwegian)	Number of representatives
Labour Party (Arbeiderpartiet)	4
Communist Party (Kommunistiske Parti)	1
Farmers' Party (Bondepartiet)	6
Joint list of the Liberal Party (Venstre) and the Radical People's Party (Radikale Folkepartiet)	1
Total number of members:	12

Eina herredsstyre 1945–1947
Party name (in Norwegian)	Number of representatives
Labour Party (Arbeiderpartiet)	4
Communist Party (Kommunistiske Parti)	1
Christian Democratic Party (Kristelig Folkeparti)	2
Farmers' Party (Bondepartiet)	5
Total number of members:	12

Eina herredsstyre 1937–1941*
Party name (in Norwegian)	Number of representatives
Labour Party (Arbeiderpartiet)	4
Farmers' Party (Bondepartiet)	8
Total number of members:	12
Note: Due to the German occupation of Norway during World War II, no elections were held for new municipal councils until after the war ended in 1945.

=== Mayors ===
The mayor (Norwegian: ordfører) of Eina Municipality was the political leader of the municipality and the chairperson of the municipal council. The following people have held this position:

- 1908–1910: Mathias Larsen Blilie (V)
- 1911–1922: Thorvald Andreassen Skaug (LL)
- 1923–1945: Thorvald P. Amlien (Bp)
- 1945–1945: Asbjørn Skaug (V)
- 1946–1948: Ingvald Nyhus (KrF)
- 1949–1951: Aksel Skaug (Bp)
- 1952–1955: Paul Hoelsveen (Bp)
- 1956–1959: Magne Bjørnerud (Bp)
- 1960–1963: Paul Hoelsveen (Sp)

== See also ==
- List of former municipalities of Norway
