= Kolbu =

Village in Østre Toten Municipality, Norway

- Village
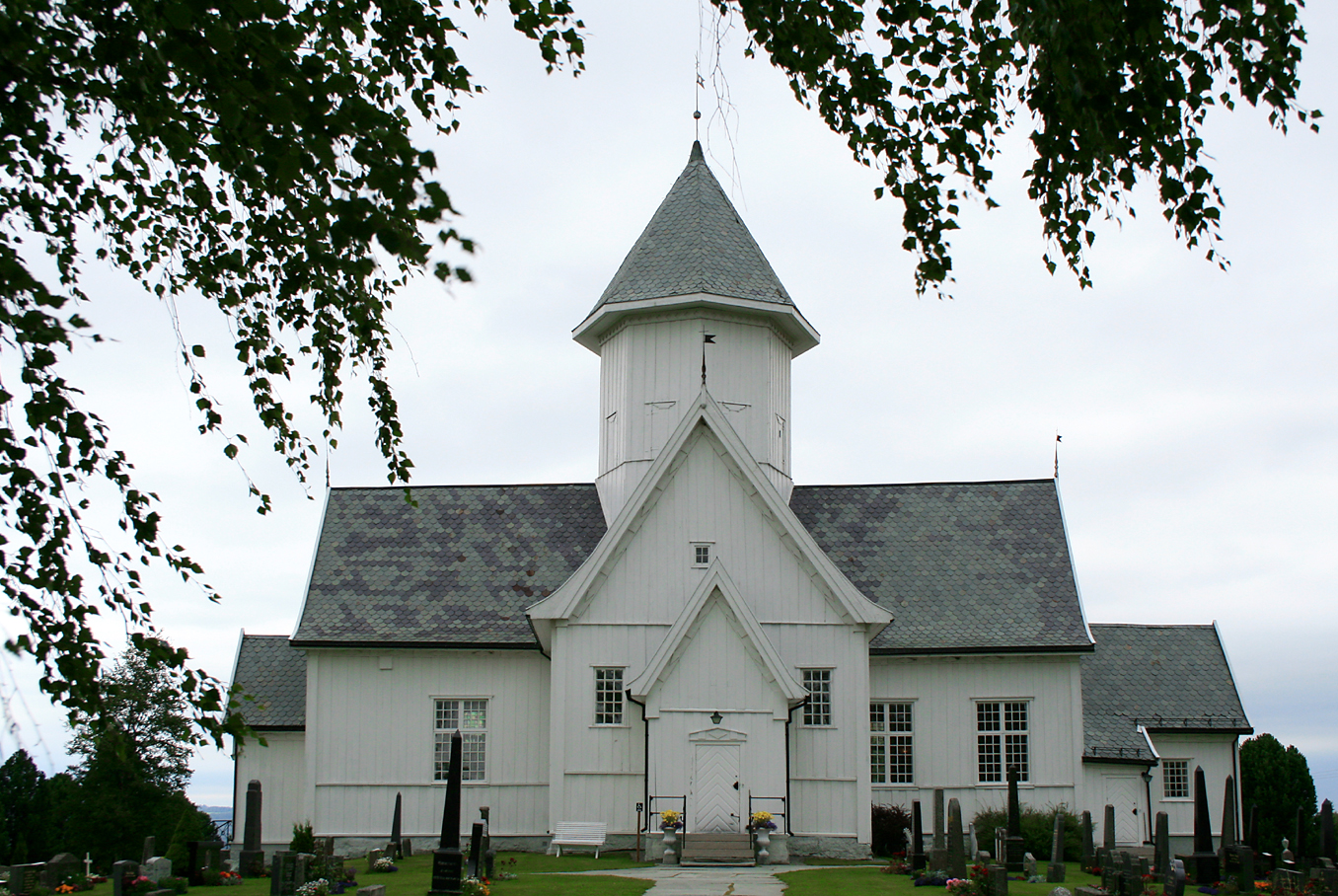
- View of the village church, Kolbu Church
- Interactive map of Kolbu
- Location within Innlandet Location within Norway
- Coordinates: 60.65033°N 10.74489°E
- Country: Norway
- Region: Eastern Norway
- County: Innlandet
- District: Toten
- Municipality: Østre Toten Municipality

Area
  - Total: 0.62 km^{2} (0.24 sq mi)
- Elevation: 279 m (915 ft)

Population (2024)
  - Total: 637
  - Density: 1,027/km^{2} (2,660/sq mi)
- Time zone: UTC+01:00 (CET)
  - Summer (DST): UTC+02:00 (CEST)
- Post Code: 2847 Kolbu

Kolbu is a village in Østre Toten Municipality in Innlandet county, Norway. The village is located in the traditional region of Toten, about 6 kilometres (3.7 mi) to the southwest of the village of Lena, the administrative centre of the municipality. The village lies in the western part of the municipality in an agricultural area, not far from the border with Vestre Toten Municipality. Kolbu Church is a cruciform church from 1730 that is located just outside the village centre.

The 0.62-square-kilometre (150-acre) village has a population (2024) of 637 and a population density of 1,027 inhabitants per square kilometre (2,660/sq mi).

== History ==
Kolbu was the administrative centre of the old Kolbu Municipality which existed for 56 years (from 1908 when it was split off from Vestre Toten Municipality until 1964 when it was merged into Østre Toten Municipality).

=== Name ===
The village was named after the old Kolbu farm (Old Norse: Kolabú) since this is where the local church was built. The first element of the name is kol which means "coal", referring to the practice of making coal by burning wood. The last element bú means "house" or "dwelling".

== Schools ==
In 2008, the Smeby, Lund, and Moen primary schools merged to form the new Kolbu School (Kolbu Skole). Students graduating from this school usually have to continue their education in Lena upper secondary school.
