= Svindland =

Svindland is a Norwegian surname. Notable people with the surname include:

- Aud Blegen Svindland (1928–2019), Norwegian physician and activist
- Kjell Svindland (1933–2025), Norwegian politician
