= Narum (group) =

Norwegian folk/country group

Narum is a Norwegian country / folk trio made up from Eina and Toten regions in Norway and made up of Benedikte Narum Jensen (vocals, guitar), Jon Anders Narum (guitar) and Lars Christian Narum (piano and organ). Lars Christian Narum, a member of the well-known band Hellbillies writes most of the music and lyrics, whereas Jon Anders Narum produces the releases. Many times, the group is joined by musicians Bjørn Holm (bass, backing vocals) and Håvar Gjestvang (drums).

The trio released their debut album Samma hen du fær in 2009 in local Toten dialect. The album was praised and was nominated for Spellemannprisen in 2009 in the folk category. Lars Christian Narum was nominated for best composer during the same event.

On 22 November 2010, they released their follow-up album Ælt som var søkk borte that won the Spellemannprisen 2010 in the folk category.

== Discography ==
=== Albums ===
Year	Album	Peak position	Certifications	Notes
Year	Album	NOR	Certifications	Notes
2009	Samma hen du fær	5		
2010	Ælt som var søkk borte	14		
2012	Sol og regn og ælt	4		
2014	Heme	30		
