= Kolbu Municipality =

Former municipality in Oppland, Norway

Kolbu Municipality Kolbu herred
- Former municipality
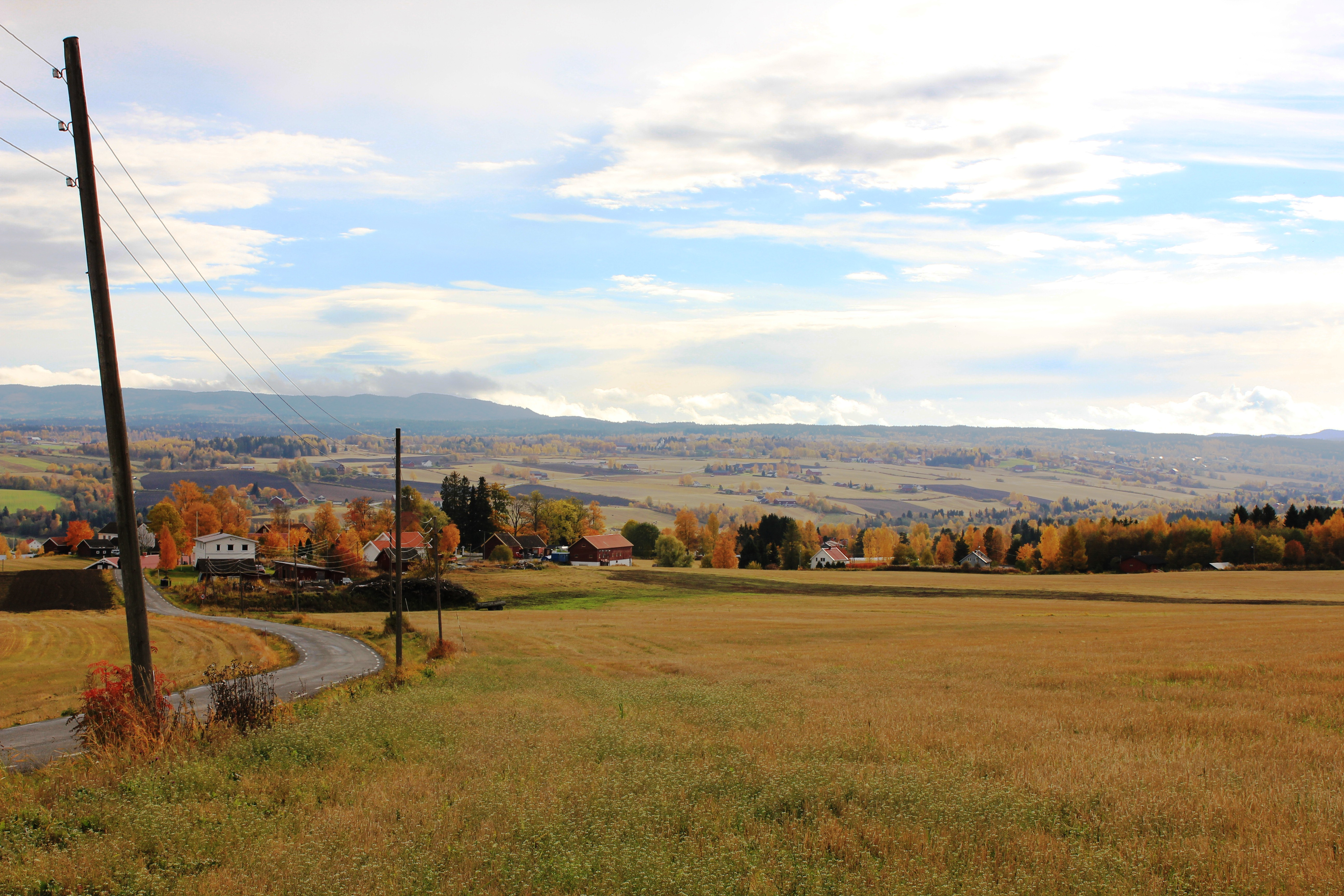
- View of the farmland in Kolbu

- Oppland within Norway

- Kolbu within Oppland
- Coordinates: 60°39′01″N 10°44′42″E
- Country: Norway
- County: Oppland
- District: Toten
- Established: 1 Jan 1908
  - Preceded by: Vestre Toten Municipality
- Disestablished: 1 Jan 1964
  - Succeeded by: Østre Toten Municipality
- Administrative centre: Kolbu

Government
  - Mayor (1961–1963): Kristian O. Narum (Sp)

Area (upon dissolution)
  - Total: 132.1 km^{2} (51.0 sq mi)
  - Rank: #459 in Norway
- Highest elevation: 825 m (2,707 ft)

Population (1963)
  - Total: 2,928
  - Rank: #313 in Norway
  - Density: 22.2/km^{2} (57/sq mi)
  - Change (10 years): ▲ +0.3%
- Demonym: Kolbuing

Official language
  - Norwegian form: Bokmål
- Time zone: UTC+01:00 (CET)
  - Summer (DST): UTC+02:00 (CEST)
- ISO 3166 code: NO-0531

Kolbu is a former municipality in the old Oppland county, Norway. The 132-square-kilometre (51 sq mi) municipality existed from 1908 until its dissolution in 1964. The area is now part of Østre Toten Municipality in the traditional district of Toten. The administrative centre was the village of Kolbu.

Prior to its dissolution in 1964, the 132.1-square-kilometre (51.0 sq mi) municipality was the 459th largest by area out of the 689 municipalities in Norway. Kolbu Municipality was the 313th most populous municipality in Norway with a population of about 2,928. The municipality's population density was 22.2 inhabitants per square kilometre (57/sq mi) and its population had increased by 0.3% over the previous 10-year period.

== General information ==
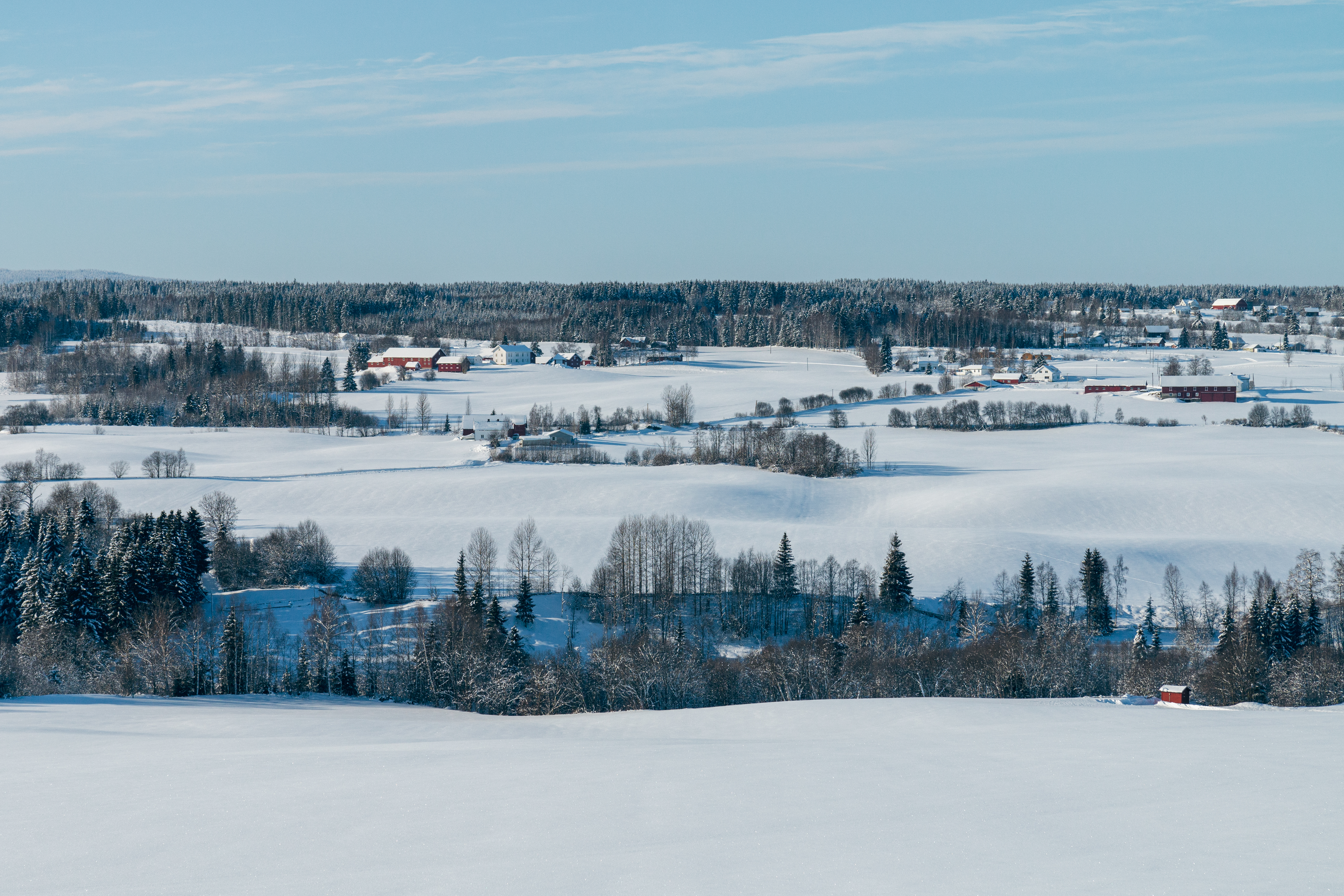
Winter view of a Kolbu farm

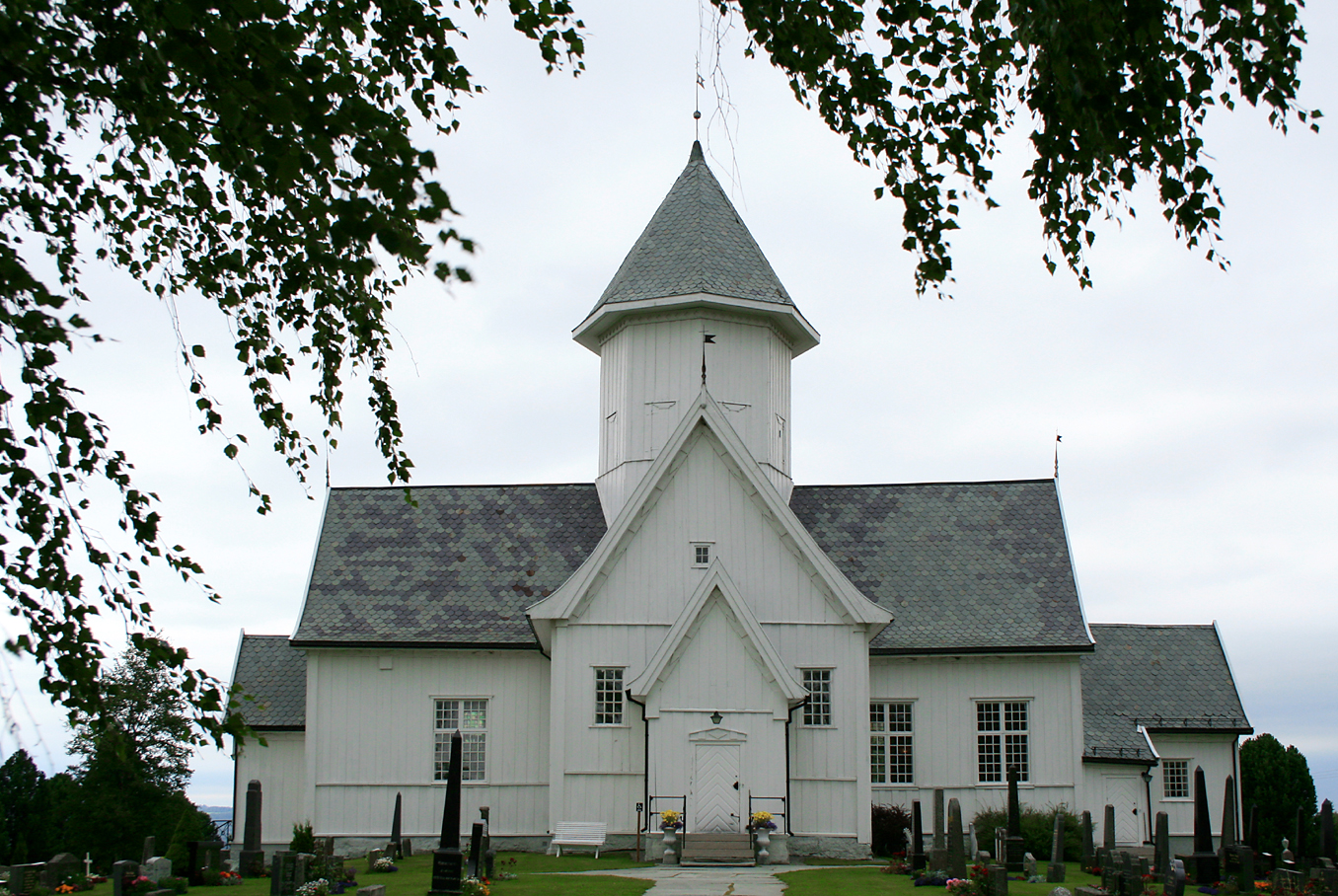
View of Kolbu Church

The municipality of Kolbu was established on 1 January 1908 when the old Vestre Toten Municipality was divided into three. The southwestern part (population: 1,173) became Eina Municipality, the southeastern part (population: 2,412) became Kolbu Municipality, and the northern part (population: 4,027) continued as Vestre Toten Municipality.

During the 1960s, there were many municipal mergers across Norway due to the work of the Schei Committee. On 1 January 1964, Kolbu Municipality (population: 2,906) was merged with Østre Toten Municipality (population: 10,661) to form a new, larger Østre Toten Municipality.

=== Name ===
The municipality (originally the parish) is named after the old Kolbu farm (Old Norse: Kolabú) since the first Kolbu Church was built there. The first element is kol which means "coal". The last element is bú which means "house" or "dwelling".

=== Churches ===
The Church of Norway had one parish (sokn) within Kolbu Municipality. At the time of the municipal dissolution, it was part of the Kolbu prestegjeld and the Toten prosti (deanery) in the Diocese of Hamar.

Churches in Kolbu Municipality
Parish (sokn)	Church name	Location of the church	Year built
Kolbu	Kolbu Church	Kolbu	1730

== Geography ==
Kolbu Municipality was located in the south-central part of the district of Toten. Vestre Toten Municipality was located to the northwest, Østre Toten Municipality was located to the east, Hurdal Municipality (in Akershus county) was located to the south, and Eina Municipality was located to the west. The highest point in the municipality was the 825-metre (2,707 ft) tall mountain Bjørnåsen, near the southern border with Hurdal Municipality.

== Government ==
While it existed, Kolbu Municipality was responsible for primary education (through 10th grade), outpatient health services, senior citizen services, welfare and other social services, zoning, economic development, and municipal roads and utilities. The municipality was governed by a municipal council of directly elected representatives. The mayor was indirectly elected by a vote of the municipal council. The municipality was under the jurisdiction of the Eidsivating Court of Appeal.

=== Municipal council ===
The municipal council (Herredsstyre) of Kolbu Municipality was made up of 17 representatives that were elected to four-year terms. The tables below show the historical composition of the council by political party.

Kolbu herredsstyre 1959–1963
Party name (in Norwegian)	Number of representatives
Labour Party (Arbeiderpartiet)	8
Christian Democratic Party (Kristelig Folkeparti)	2
Centre Party (Senterpartiet)	7
Total number of members:	17
Note: On 1 January 1964, Kolbu Municipality became part of Østre Toten Municipality.

Kolbu herredsstyre 1955–1959
Party name (in Norwegian)	Number of representatives
Labour Party (Arbeiderpartiet)	8
Christian Democratic Party (Kristelig Folkeparti)	2
Farmers' Party (Bondepartiet)	6
Liberal Party (Venstre)	1
Total number of members:	17

Kolbu herredsstyre 1951–1955
Party name (in Norwegian)	Number of representatives
Labour Party (Arbeiderpartiet)	7
Christian Democratic Party (Kristelig Folkeparti)	2
Farmers' Party (Bondepartiet)	6
Liberal Party (Venstre)	1
Total number of members:	16

Kolbu herredsstyre 1947–1951
Party name (in Norwegian)	Number of representatives
Labour Party (Arbeiderpartiet)	6
Christian Democratic Party (Kristelig Folkeparti)	1
Farmers' Party (Bondepartiet)	7
Joint list of the Liberal Party (Venstre) and the Radical People's Party (Radikale Folkepartiet)	2
Total number of members:	16

Kolbu herredsstyre 1945–1947
Party name (in Norwegian)	Number of representatives
Labour Party (Arbeiderpartiet)	6
Farmers' Party (Bondepartiet)	7
Joint list of the Liberal Party (Venstre) and the Radical People's Party (Radikale Folkepartiet)	3
Total number of members:	16

Kolbu herredsstyre 1937–1941*
Party name (in Norwegian)	Number of representatives
Labour Party (Arbeiderpartiet)	5
Radical People's Party (Radikale Folkepartiet)	2
Farmers' Party (Bondepartiet)	9
Total number of members:	16
Note: Due to the German occupation of Norway during World War II, no elections were held for new municipal councils until after the war ended in 1945.

=== Mayors ===
The mayor (Norwegian: ordfører) of Kolbu Municipality was the political leader of the municipality and the chairperson of the municipal council. The following people have held this position:

- 1908–1916: Hans Sethne (LL)
- 1917–1919: Olaf Holthe(LL)
- 1920–1922: Johannes Hoel (LL)
- 1923–1925: Olaf Holthe (LL)
- 1926–1928: Johannes Hoel (Bp)
- 1929–1934: Paul J. Narum (Bp)
- 1935–1936: Erik Gaardløs (RF)
- 1937–1937: Claus Smedsrud (Ap)
- 1937–1937: Paul J. Narum (Bp)
- 1938–1944: Hans D. Nøkleby (Bp)
- 1945–1945: Per P. Røise (NS)
- 1946–1947: Paul J. Narum (Bp)
- 1948–1951: Bernt Dysthe (Bp)
- 1952–1956: Karl Lund (Ap)
- 1957–1960: Mathias Molstad (Sp)
- 1961–1963: Kristian O. Narum (Sp)

== See also ==
- List of former municipalities of Norway
