= Narum =

Narum may refer to:

- Narom language, sometimes spelt Narum, a Malayo-Polynesian language
- Narum (group), a Norwegian folk/country group

Persons

- Bill Narum (1947-2009), American artist, illustrator, and Texas counter-culture icon
- Buster Narum, (1940–2004), American baseball player
