= Eina Church =

Church in Innlandet, Norway

- Eina kirke
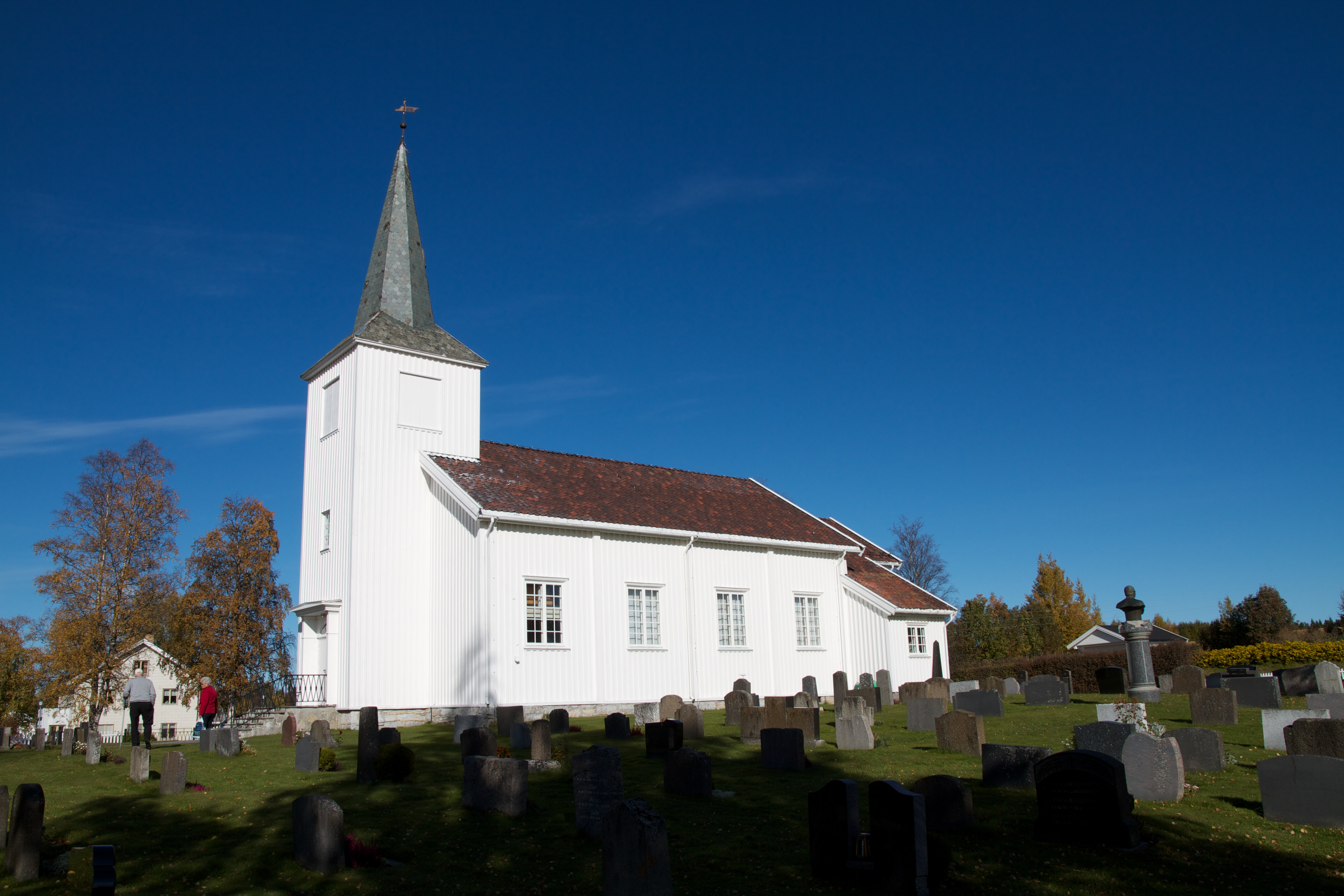
- View of the church
- Eina Church
- 60°34′19″N 10°39′14″E
- Location: Vestre Toten, Innlandet
- Country: Norway
- Denomination: Church of Norway
- Churchmanship: Evangelical Lutheran

History
- Status: Parish church
- Founded: 1890
- Consecrated: 11 December 1890

Architecture
- Functional status: Active
- Architect: Jacob Wilhelm Nordan
- Architectural type: Long church
- Completed: 1890 (136 years ago)

Specifications
- Capacity: 250
- Materials: Wood

Administration
- Diocese: Hamar bispedømme
- Deanery: Toten prosti
- Parish: Eina
- Norwegian Cultural Heritage Site
- Type: Church
- Status: Automatically protected
- ID: 84080

Eina Church (Norwegian: Eina kirke) is a parish church of the Church of Norway in Vestre Toten Municipality in Innlandet county, Norway. It is located in the village of Eina. It is the church for the Eina parish which is part of the Toten prosti (deanery) in the Diocese of Hamar. The white, wooden church was built in a long church design in 1890 using plans drawn up by the architect Jacob Wilhelm Nordan. The church seats about 250 people.

== History ==
Work for church building at Eina began in the mid-1880s when a building committee was appointed. A plot of land was donated by Ole Johnsrud. In 1888, the parish received architectural drawings made by Jacob Wilhelm Nordan for the new church. The following year, a formal building permit was granted along with a permit to build a burial ground. The church was consecrated on 11 December 1890 by Bishop Arnoldus Hille.

== Media gallery ==
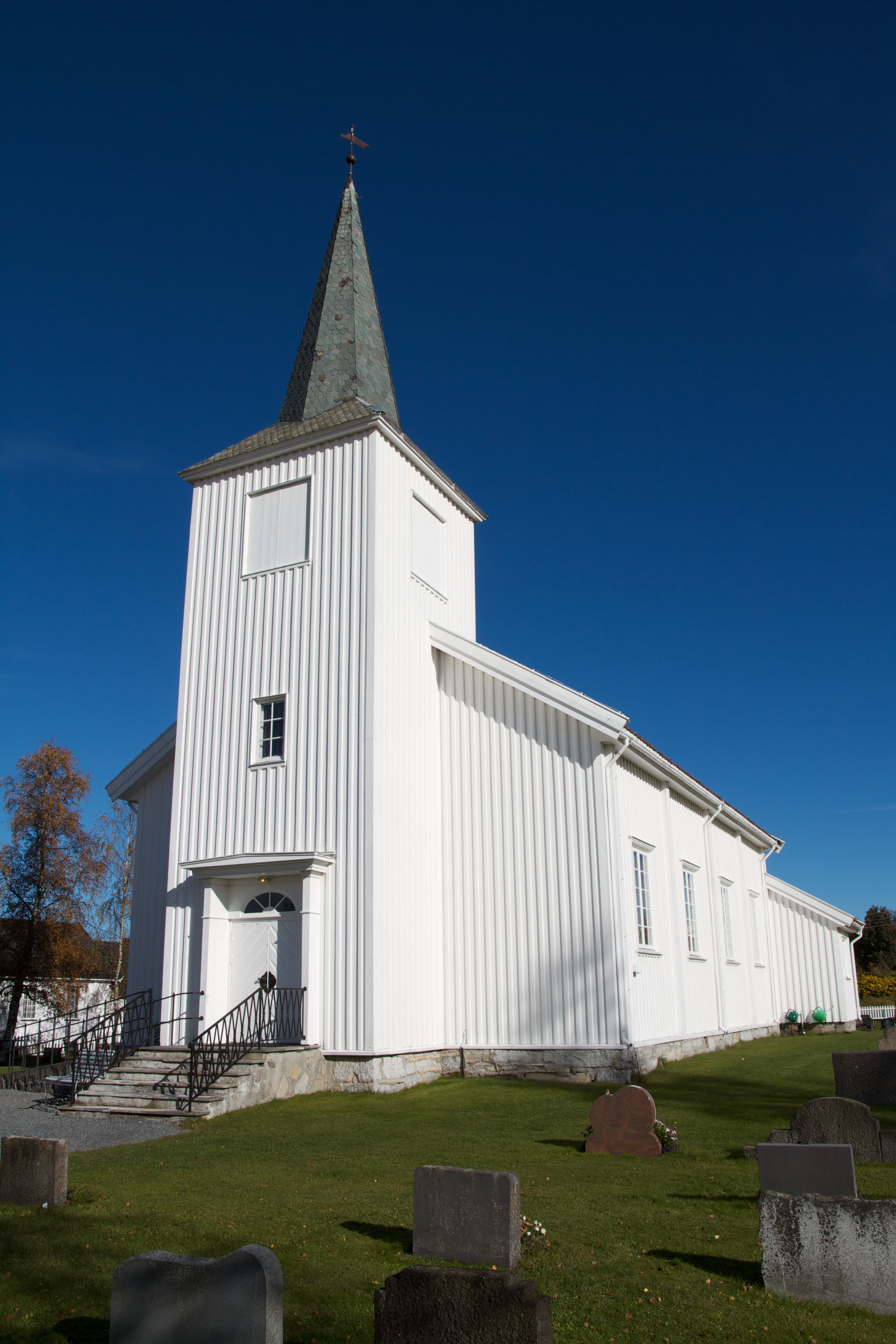

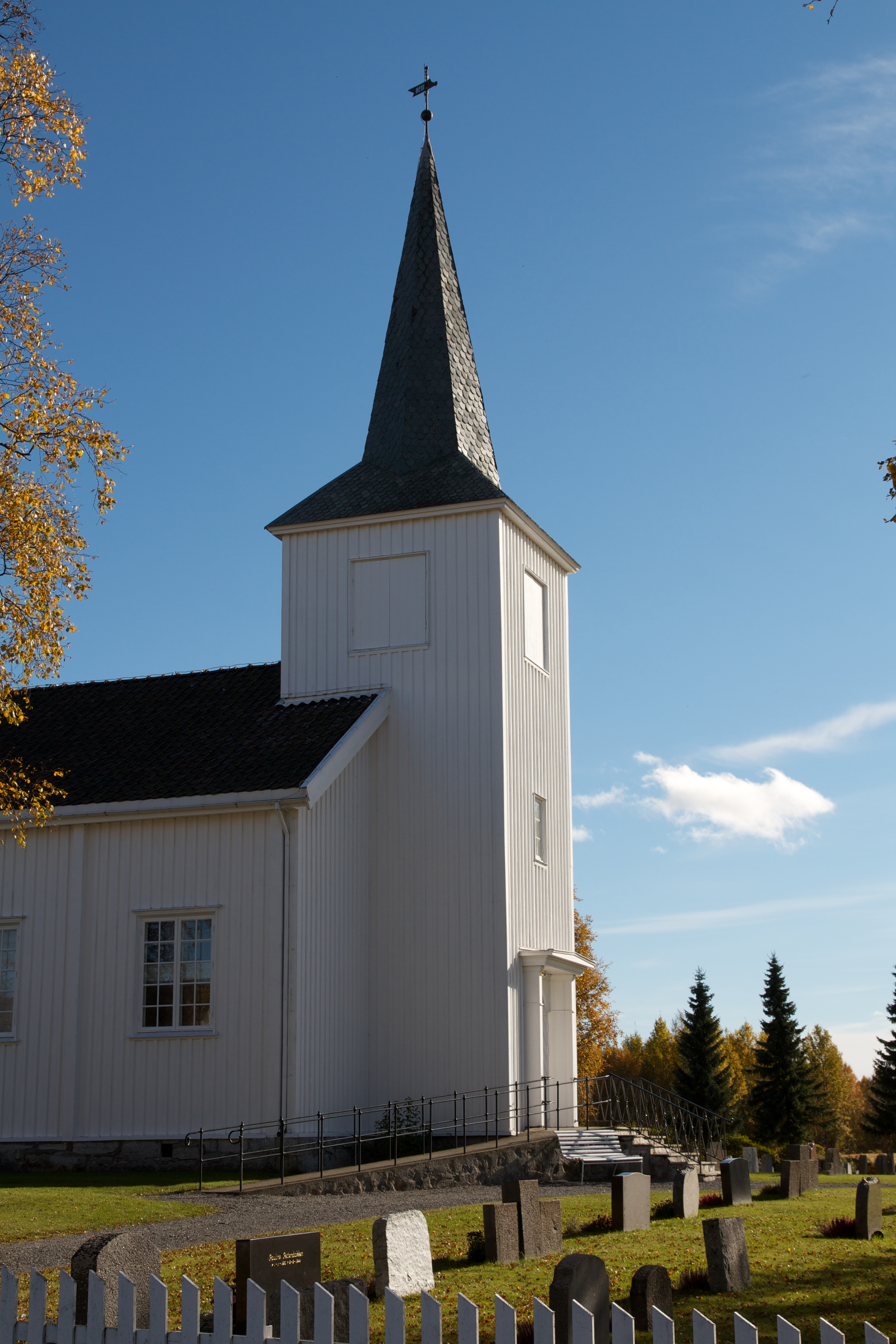

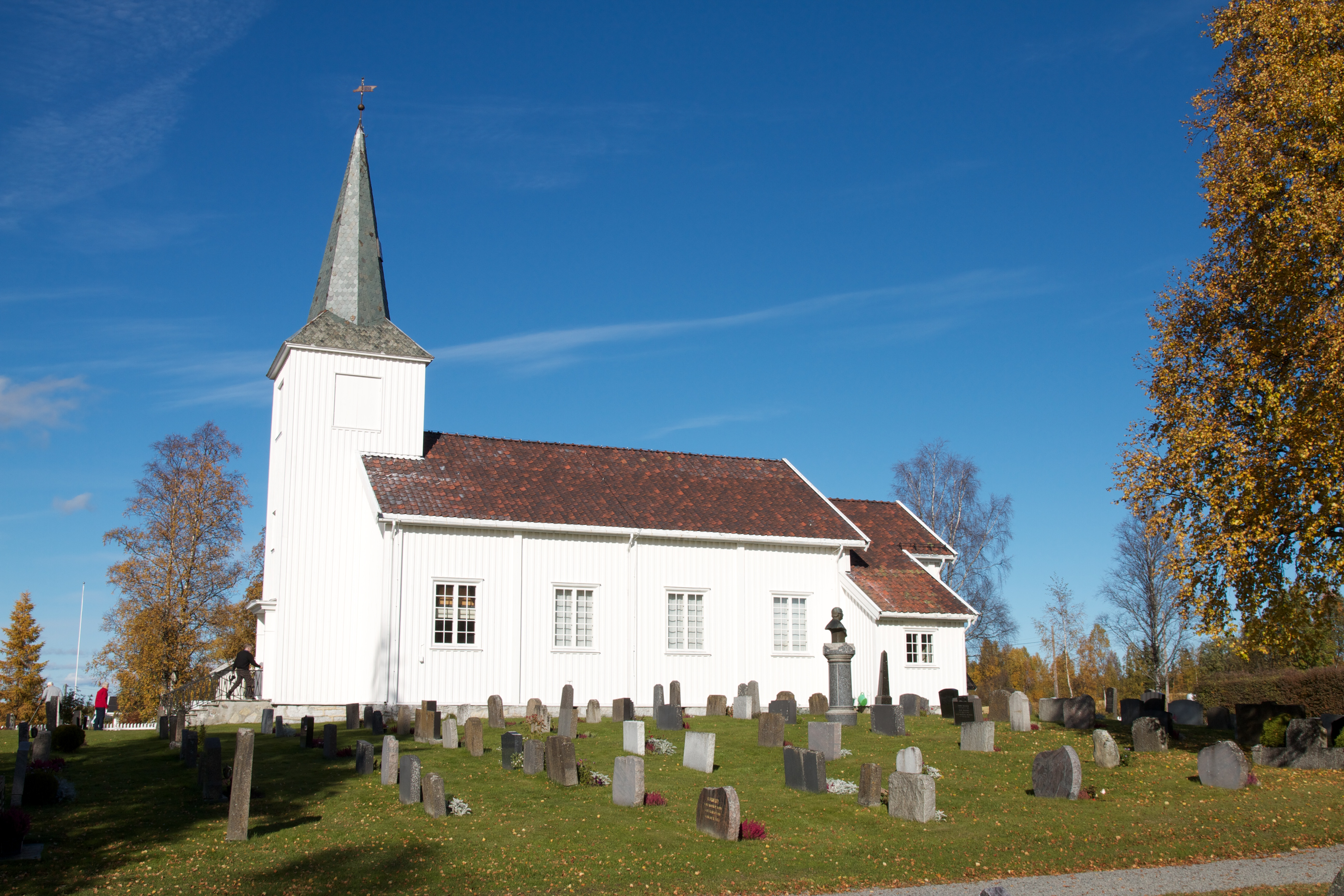

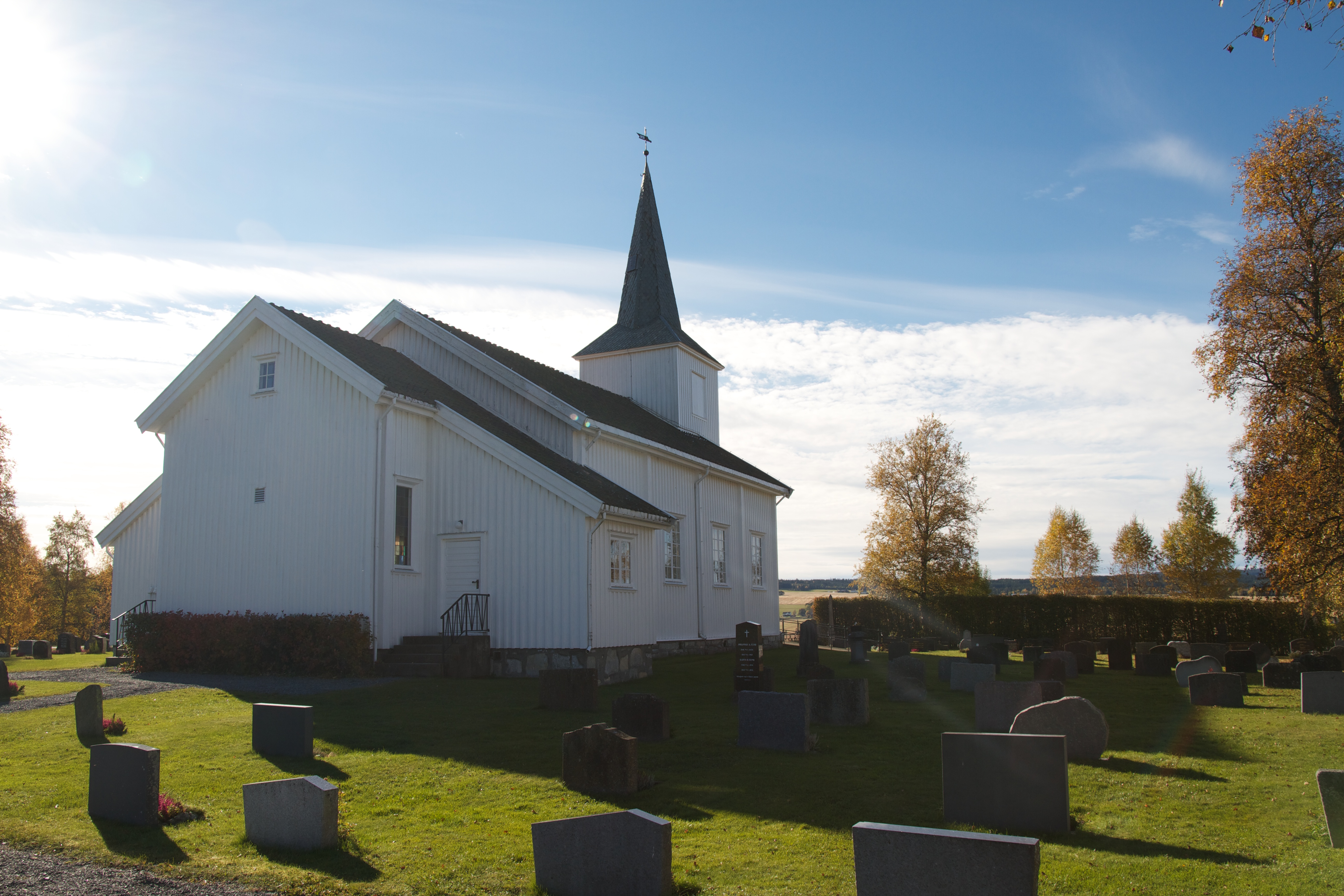

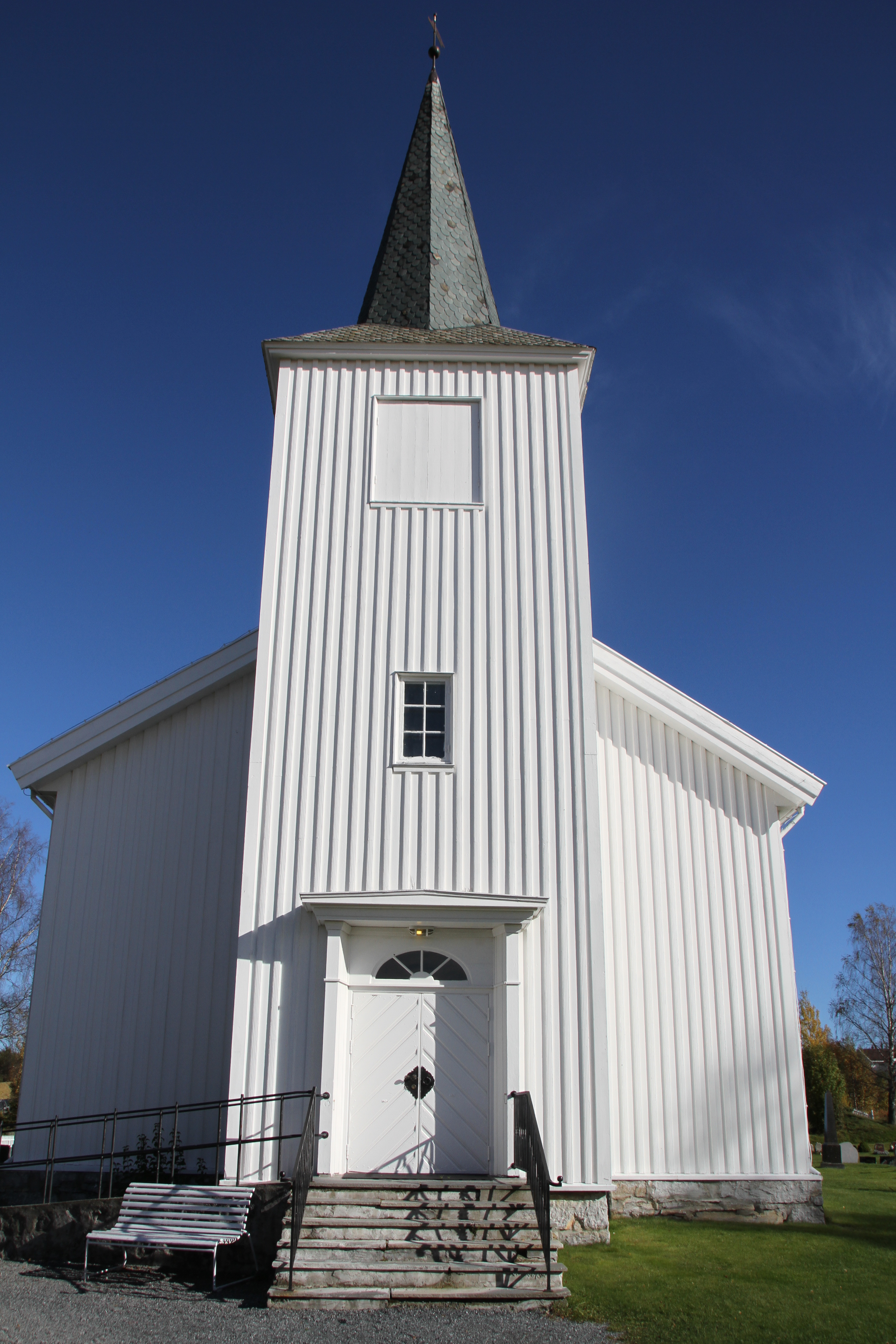

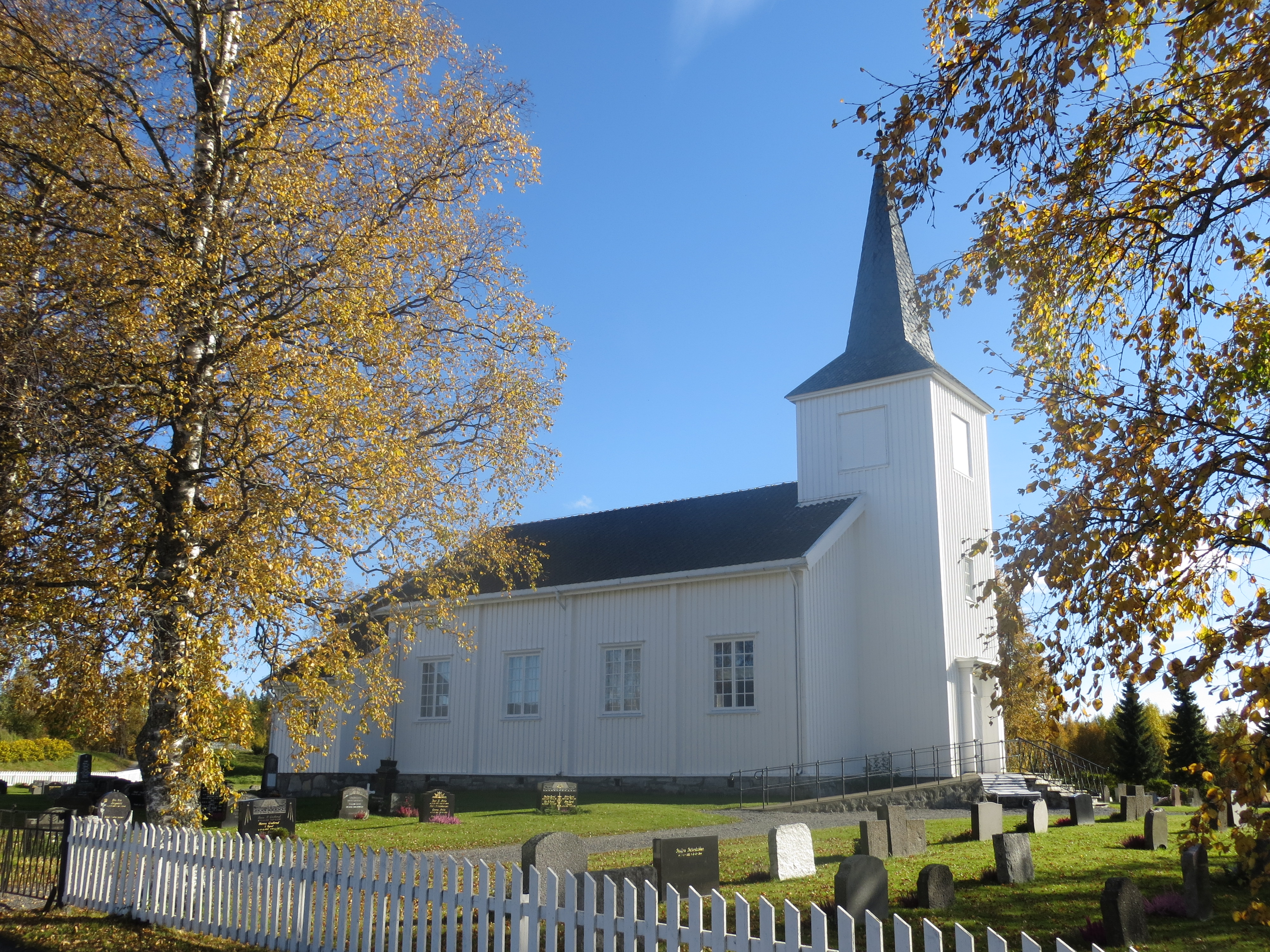

== See also ==
- List of churches in Hamar
