= Karsten Gaarder =

Norwegian judge

Karsten Gaarder (5 April 1902 – 1980) was a Norwegian judge.

He was born in Vestre Toten Municipality, a son of farmers Petter Hansen Gaarder and Kari Alfstad. He graduated as cand.jur. in 1924, and later served as judge, secretary at the Ministry of Justice, and lecturer at the Norwegian School of Economics. He was appointed Justice of the Supreme Court of Norway from 1946. He was decorated Commander of the Order of St. Olav in 1964.

He died in 1980. His son Bård Gaarder was a presiding judge, and married to noted educationalist Birgit Brock-Utne for many years.
