= Eina =

Village in Vestre Toten Municipality, Norway

- Village
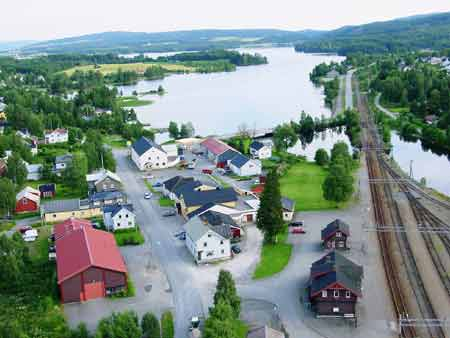
- View of the village facing south. The lake seen is Einavatnet; the railroad track is the Gjøvik Line.
- Interactive map of Eina
- Location within Innlandet Location within Norway
- Coordinates: 60.62864°N 10.59863°E
- Country: Norway
- Region: Eastern Norway
- County: Innlandet
- District: Toten
- Municipality: Vestre Toten Municipality

Area
  - Total: 0.74 km^{2} (0.29 sq mi)
- Elevation: 401 m (1,316 ft)

Population (2024)
  - Total: 729
  - Density: 985/km^{2} (2,550/sq mi)
- Time zone: UTC+01:00 (CET)
  - Summer (DST): UTC+02:00 (CEST)
- Post Code: 2843 Eina

Eina is a village in Vestre Toten Municipality in Innlandet county, Norway. The village is located along the Gjøvikbanen railway line, between the villages of Jaren and Raufoss. The village of Eina is located 12 kilometres (7.5 mi) south of the municipal centre of Raufoss, on the north shore of the lake Einavatnet. The river Hunnselva runs north through the village from the lake Einavatnet to the large lake Mjøsa.

The 0.74-square-kilometre (180-acre) village has a population (2024) of 729 and a population density of 985 inhabitants per square kilometre (2,550/sq mi). About 1,500 people inhabit the rural area surrounding the lake, outside of the village of Eina.

== History ==
The area has been populated since before the early 11th century, but did not see significant growth until the Norwegian industrialization. This was due to the Gjøvikbanen railway line being built, which brought passengers and freight to and through the village. In 1902, the local railroad station opened and it was named Eina, after the nearby lake Einavatnet. In 1908, the village of Eina and its surroundings became a municipality of its own when Vestre Toten Municipality split into three: Eina Municipality, Kolbu Municipality and Vestre Toten Municipality. The village of Eina was the administrative centre of the old Eina Municipality. In 1964, Eina Municipality was merged with Vestre Toten Municipality.

=== Valdresbanen ===
Eina was also connected to Valdresbanen railway line until it closed. The Valdresbanen was built in 1906, and was originally a privately owned line, until the government assumed control in 1937. It covered the distance from Eina to Fagernes, which is located in Nord-Aurdal Municipality. The 109-kilometre (68 mi) long track was closed in 1988.
