= Kolbu Church =

Church in Innlandet, Norway

- Kolbu kirke
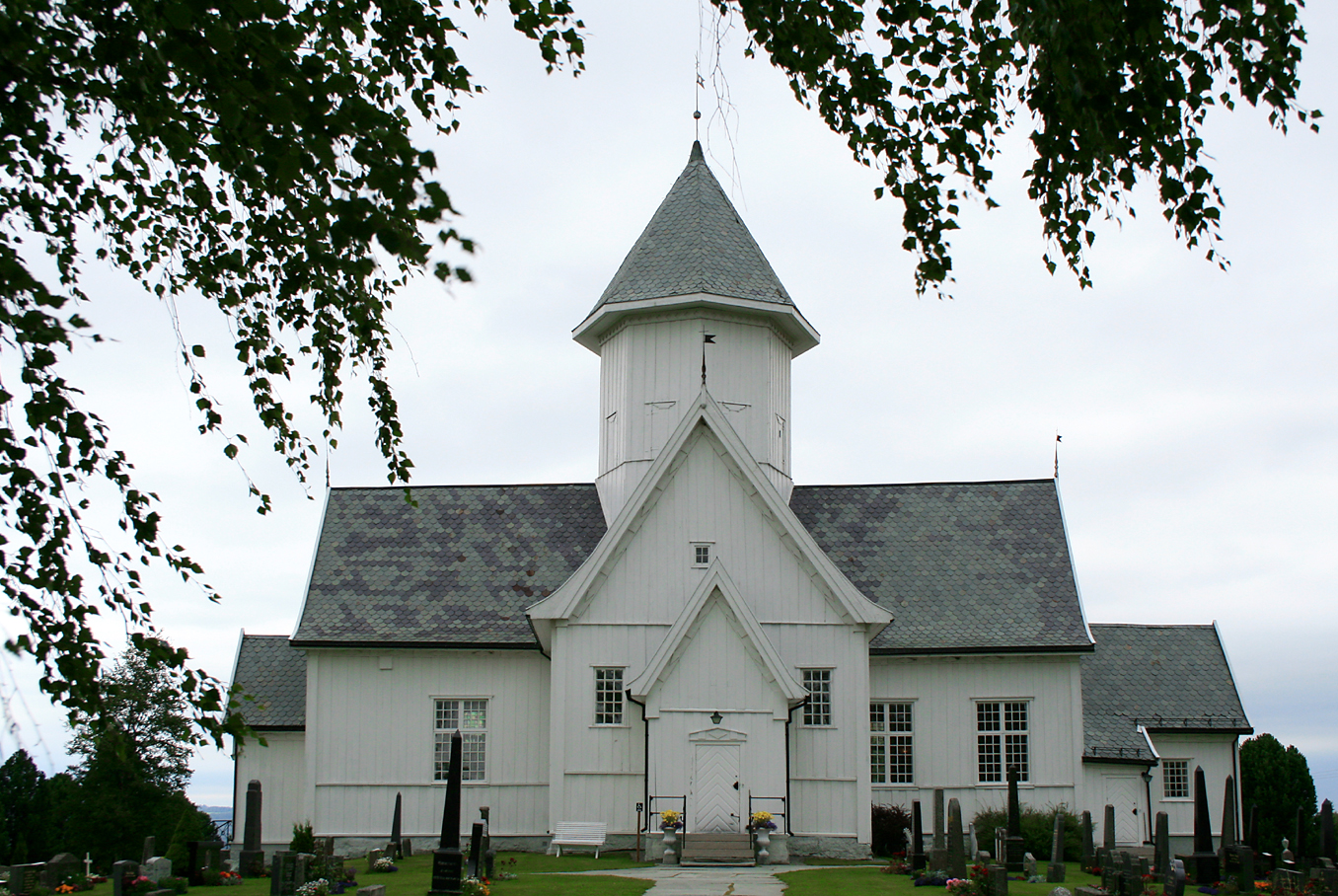
- View of the church
- Kolbu Church
- 60°37′47″N 10°46′25″E
- Location: Østre Toten, Innlandet
- Country: Norway
- Denomination: Church of Norway
- Previous denomination: Catholic Church
- Churchmanship: Evangelical Lutheran

History
- Status: Parish church
- Founded: 13th century
- Consecrated: 22 February 1730

Architecture
- Functional status: Active
- Architectural type: Cruciform
- Completed: 1730 (296 years ago)

Specifications
- Capacity: 400
- Materials: Wood

Administration
- Diocese: Hamar bispedømme
- Deanery: Toten prosti
- Parish: Kolbu
- Norwegian Cultural Heritage Site
- Type: Church
- Status: Automatically protected
- ID: 84805

Kolbu Church (Norwegian: Kolbu kirke) is a parish church of the Church of Norway in Østre Toten Municipality in Innlandet county, Norway. It is located in the village of Kolbu. It is the church for the Kolbu parish which is part of the Toten prosti (deanery) in the Diocese of Hamar. The white, wooden church was built in a cruciform design in 1730 using plans drawn up by an unknown architect. The church seats about 400 people.

== History ==
The earliest existing historical records of the church date back to the year 1381, but the church was not built that year. The first church in this area was a wooden stave church that was likely built in the 13th century. This church was built at Dyste, about 5 kilometres (3.1 mi) to the south of the present church site. Not many details are known about this church, but it was a small long church with no tower. It was in use until around the Reformation when it was closed. After this, the building fell into disrepair. It is said to have stood as a ruin for centuries until 1784 when it finally was torn down.

Around the year 1300, a new church was built at Molstad, about 5 kilometres (3.1 mi) north of the old Dyste church. This new church was located on a plot of land about 380 metres (1,250 ft) west of the present Kolbu Church. This building was a small long church and it was an annex chapel to the nearby Hoff Church. Both the Dyste Church and the Molstad Church were used at the same time for about 200 years. In the early 1500s, the Dyste Church was closed and consolidated with the nearby Molstad Church. At the Norwegian church auction, Molstad Church was bought by Bishop Bartholomæus Deichman, who asked for four years to carry out necessary repairs. At a meeting in 1726, it was determined that the church was difficult to repair and that it was too small. Planning for a new church building began around that time.

A new church site was chosen about 380 metres (1,250 ft) to the east of the Molstad church. The new site had more room. The new building was a wooden cruciform church with a strong central tower. This new building was consecrated on 22 February 1730. The Bishop owned this new building, but he died in 1731. The church was sold again and changed owner several times before it was purchased by the local villagers in 1789.

== Media gallery ==
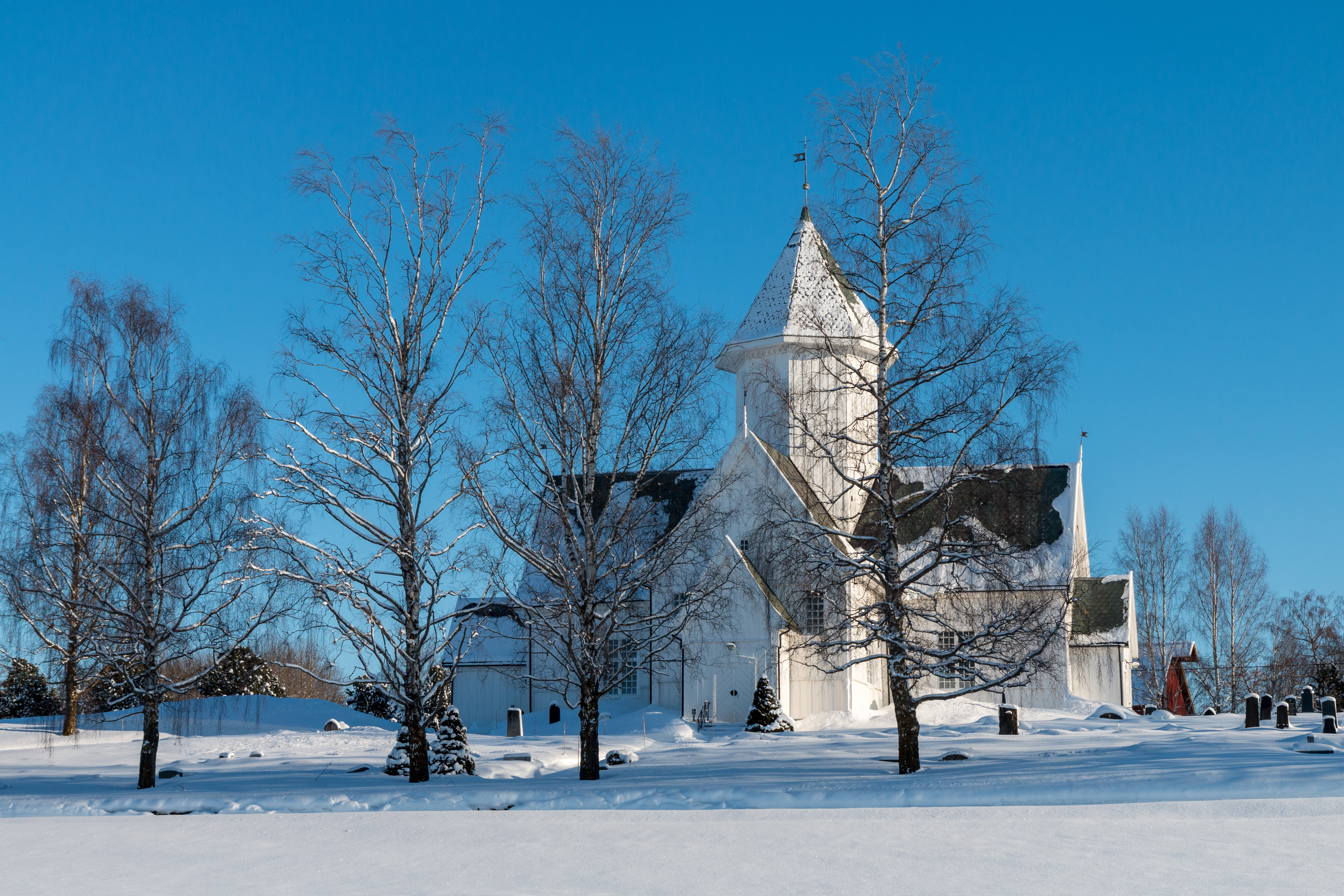

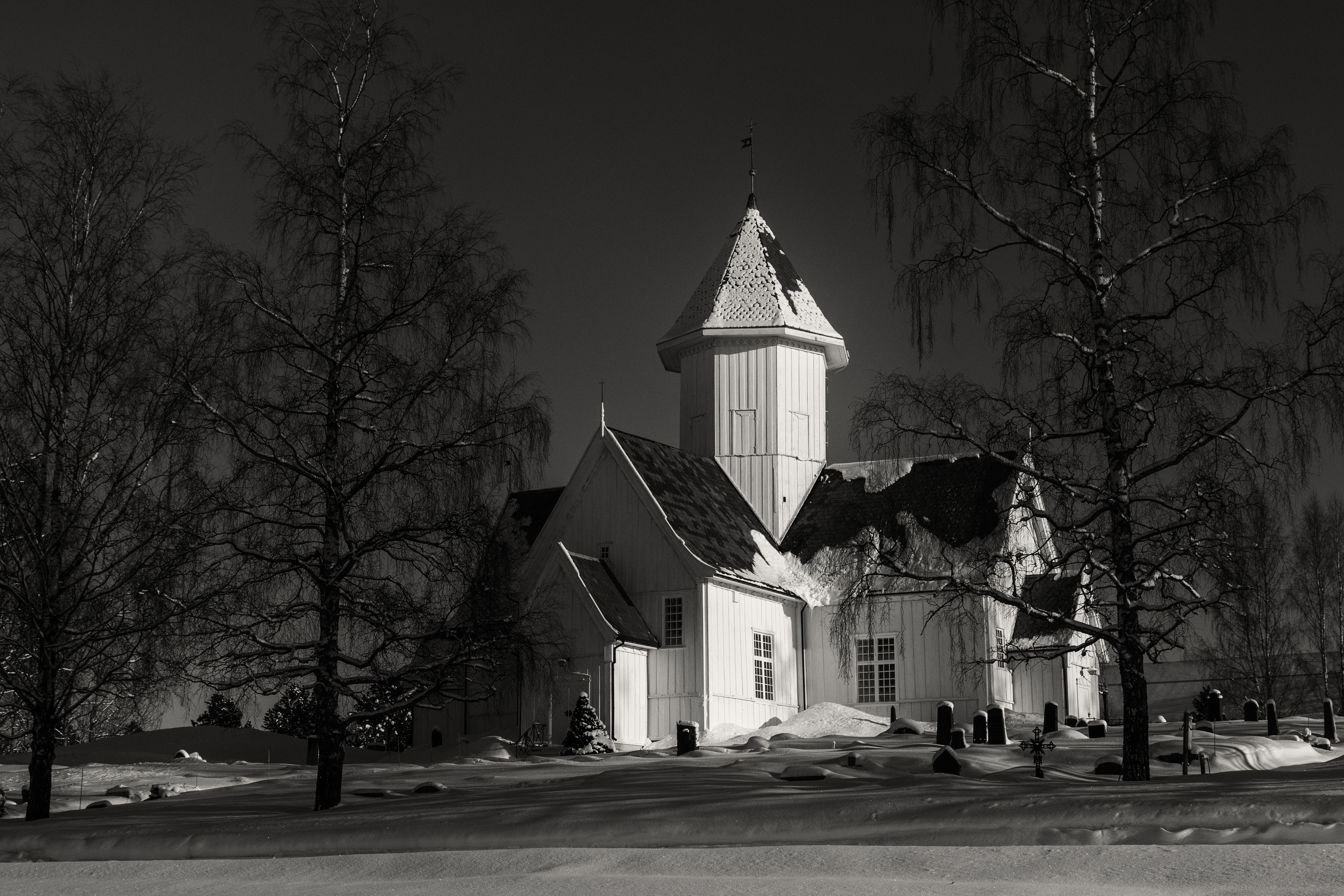

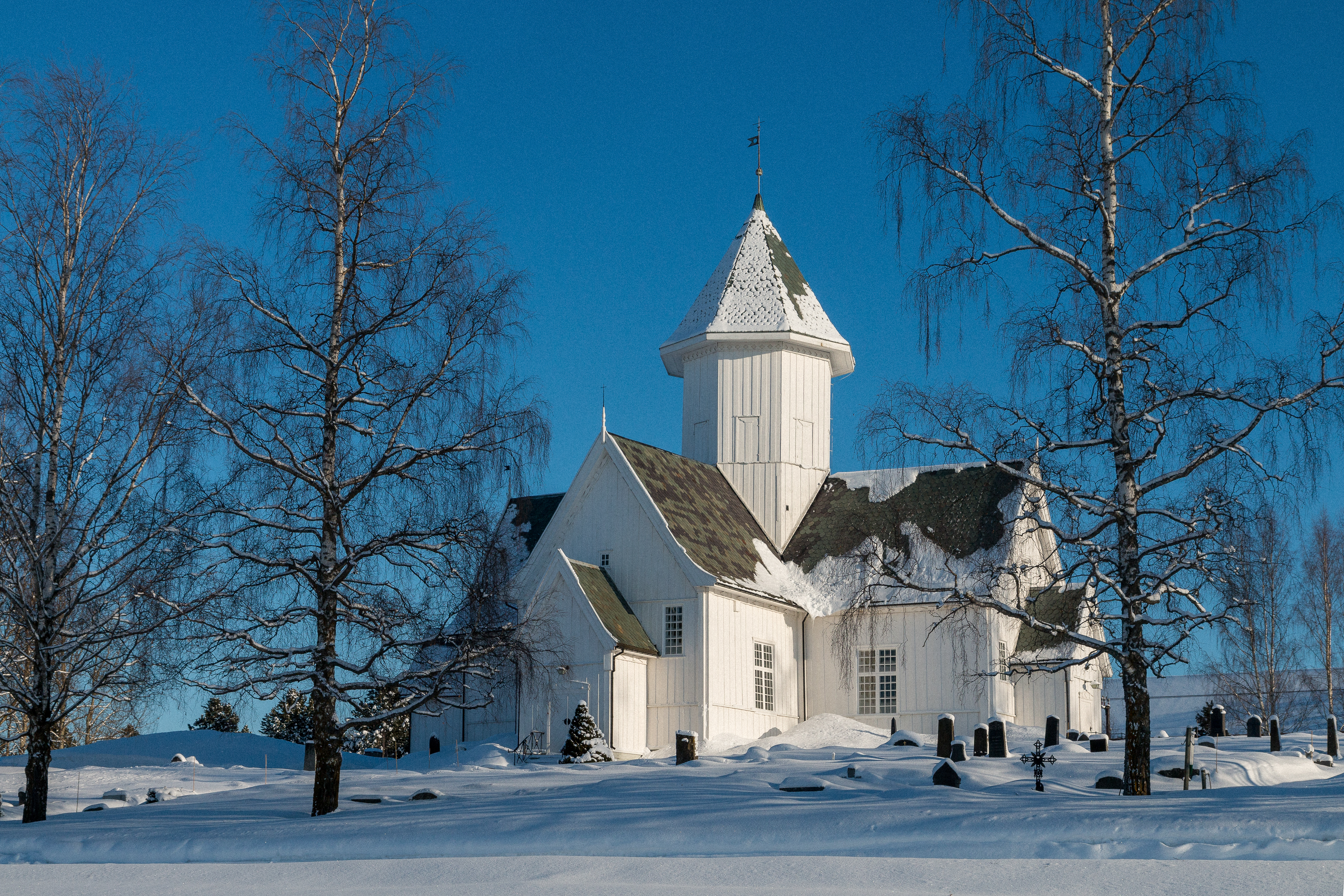

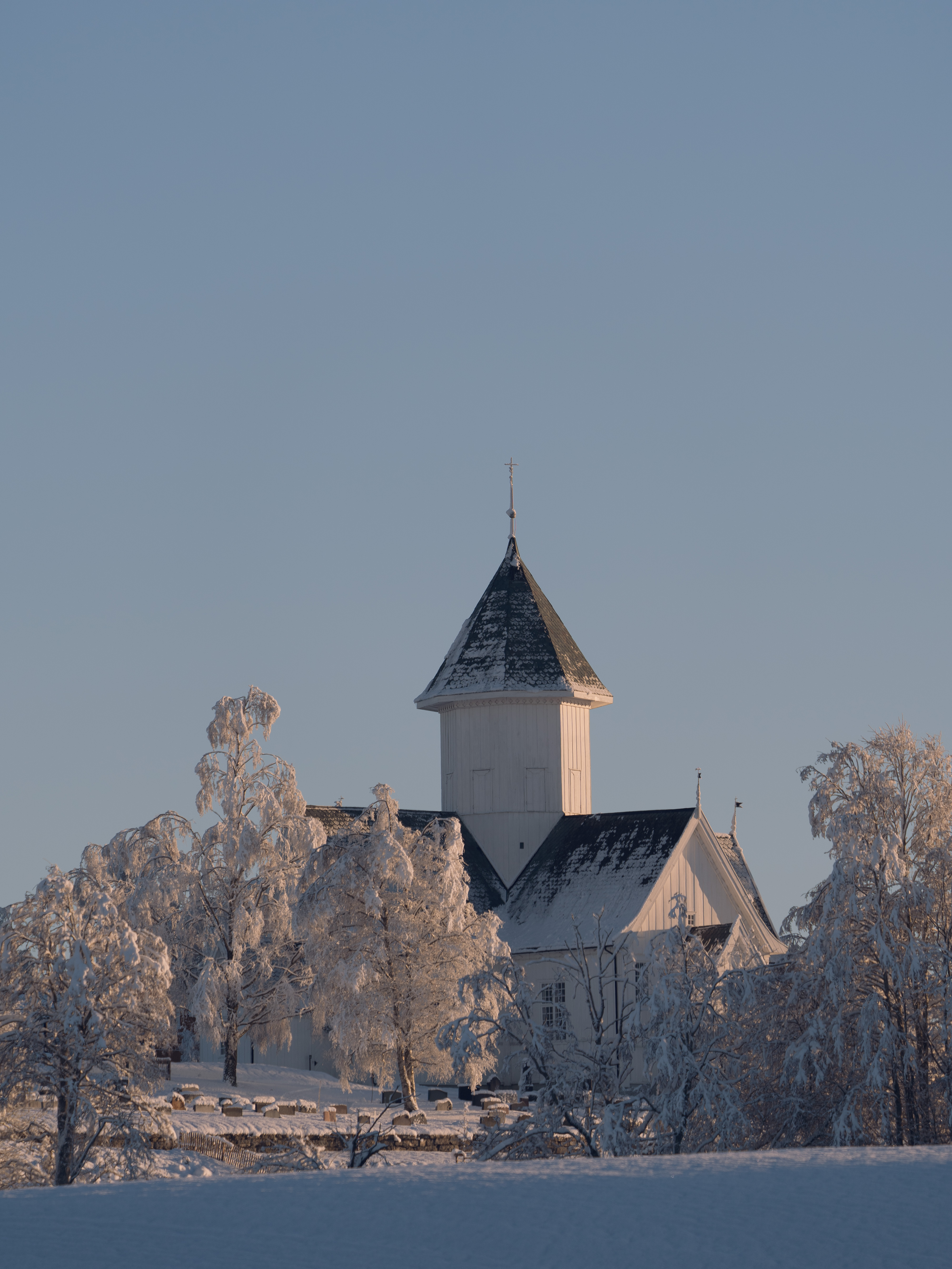

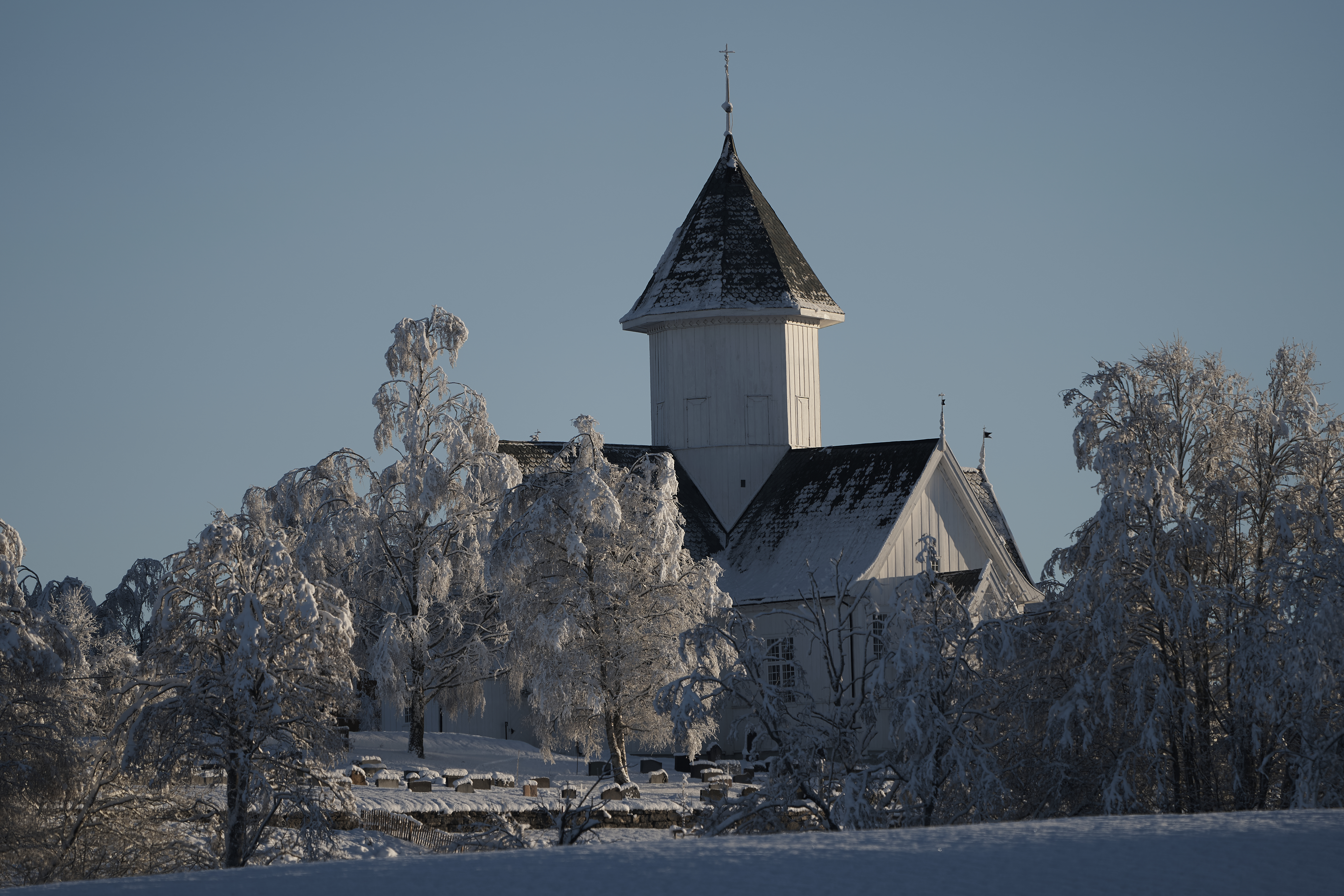

== See also ==
- List of churches in Hamar
