= Aud Blegen Svindland =

Norwegian physician and activist (1928–2019)

- Born: Aud Kjellaug Blegen; 10 June 1928; Vestre Toten Municipality, Norway
- Died: 1 January 2019 (aged 90); Oslo, Norway
- Education: University of Zurich (MD)
- Occupations: Physician; women's rights activist
- Years active: 1960–2005

Aud Blegen Svindland (10 June 1928 – 1 January 2019) was a Norwegian physician and women's rights activist. She is known for her involvement in developing an interdisciplinary approach to occupational health and her work on laws concerning reproduction. She was one of the leading figures in health legislation in Norway in the 1970s and 1980s.

== Early life ==
Aud Kjellaug Blegen was born on 10 June 1928 in Vestre Toten Municipality, Norway to Petra (née Kvikstad) and Peter Blegen. Her father operated a farm and in her youth, she read an article about a woman physician in Zürich. Her curiosity was piqued about the town and women studying medicine, so after completing high school at the Vinterlandbruksskolen (Winter Agricultural School), she continued her education at the University of Zurich. She completed studies on physiotherapy and went on to earn her medical degree in 1960.

== Career ==
Blegen began her medical practice as a hospital physician in 1960 and then in 1963 began working as a physician in Afghanistan for the United Nations. Her work in Afghanistan focused on family planning and contraception and she remained there until 1965. Moving to London, she undertook additional studies in public health, specializing in preventative care and health administration. At that time, London was developing family planning centers and Blegen visited the counseling centers which offered advice on abortion and contraception. Earning her diploma in 1967, she returned to Norway, where contraception counseling was in its infancy.

Becoming politically active, Blegen was one of the leaders in 1969 of the "Keep Norway Clean" campaign and was involved in disseminating information and participating in debates on the abortion issue as part of the New Feminist Movement in Norway. The law of 1964, which decriminalized the medical procedure made it obtainable only upon the application of a woman's general practitioner to a panel, which then made the decision for her. Activists and physicians believed that the law should be revised as it limited women's agency over their own bodies and by 1969, research showed inequality in the panels' decisions on abortion applications.

In 1970, Blegen was hired as an assistant director to the Norwegian Directorate for Health and Social Affairs and that year helped found the Office for Prevention and Abortion in Oslo. The goal of the office, staffed by health personnel, was to help women complete the applications for a legal abortion, with professional guidance. By 1971, she was recognized as an authority on the abortion laws in Norway by Verdens Gang and opened the Clinic for Sexual Enlightenment with Astor Reigstad. The new clinic allowed the physicians to offer evening consultations and served to change the perception of contraceptive service among both the public and medical community. Still working at the Health Directorate, she was made a director in 1972 and served through 1977.

In her work with the Health Directorate, Svindland worked to implement the Health Stations Act passed in 1972 which required all municipalities to take over the clinics for mothers and children that up to that point had been operated by the Norwegian Women's Public Health Association. The clinics were expanded to include preventative medicine and provide health checks for the elderly. The idea was that children, expectant mothers, and elderly patients shared the need for frequent and regular health monitoring. This was followed by the Municipal Health Act, which established standards of care and equal access to health care.

In 1973, she was featured in an article in the feminist magazine Sirene, which counseled women on the abortion application process. The article was accompanied by a list of 300 known doctors who would not perform abortions, with the hope that it would make the process easier for women to know which doctors were unlikely to assist them. By 1975, the Clinic for Sexual Enlightenment had grown to employing 20 physicians to meet the demands of clients. That year, they also made the decision to expand their service beyond applications, assisting with the appeals process, and if that failed, to finding safe alternatives abroad.

In 1976, Svindland helped the Labor Party create the brochure Seksualopplysning, prevensjonsveiledning og selvbestemt abort – merkesaker for Arbeiderpartiets kvinnebevegelse (Sexual Education, Contraception and Self-Determined Abortion – Landmarks for the Labor Party's Women's Movement). In 1977, Svindland was elected chair of the Women's Secretariat of the Labor Party, serving until 1980. Campaigning in favor of self-determination, sex education in schools and equality in education and the right to work, the Labor Party, in a coalition with the Socialist Left Party won the election and formed the new government. In May 1978, legislation was passed to allow self-determined abortion and though Svindland was pleased that reform had been passed, she did not agree with the provision that allowed health personnel to refuse to provide the procedure.

During her time in the government, Svindland held various cabinet posts and was responsible for developing an interdisciplinary method for coordinating operational health regulations and establishing a working environmental law. She served from 1978 to 1980 on the Occupational Health Services Council of the Ministry of Social Affairs, from 1980 to 1984 on the Product Control Council of the Ministry of the Environment, and from 1985 to 1987 on the Pollution Council of the Ministry of the Environment. In 1987, she became the director of Occupational Health Services in the Norwegian Labour Inspection Authority, managing its 70 affiliated entities and legislation on healthcare and continued working there through the mid-1990s.

Throughout her career, Svindland was involved in international health care. Besides her early work for the United Nations, in 1972, she attended the United Nations Conference on the Human Environment held in Stockholm and was instrumental in the passage of a proposal for increased funding for family planning. She was a participant in developing the action plan at the 1974 United Nations Conference on Population, held in Budapest. In 1978, she spoke on violence against women and female circumcision at the Socialist International Women Conference held in Vancouver, British Columbia, which resulted in a resolution against the practice of female genital mutilation. She also served as the chair of the health committee for the Norwegian Agency for Development Cooperation for several years. In a 1995 interview, Svindland stated she had never been a politician, but had used political tools when it was necessary. She operated a private practice in the Frogner district of Oslo through at least 2005.

== Death and legacy ==
Svindland died on 1 January 2019 after a long illness. She is often called the "Mother of Norway's Abortion Law" and was instrumental in changing the feminist phrasing from a demand for "free" to one of "self-determined" abortion. She was a leading figure in health legislation in Norway in the 1970s and 1980s.
