= Raufoss =

Town in Vestre Toten Municipality, Norway

- Town/City
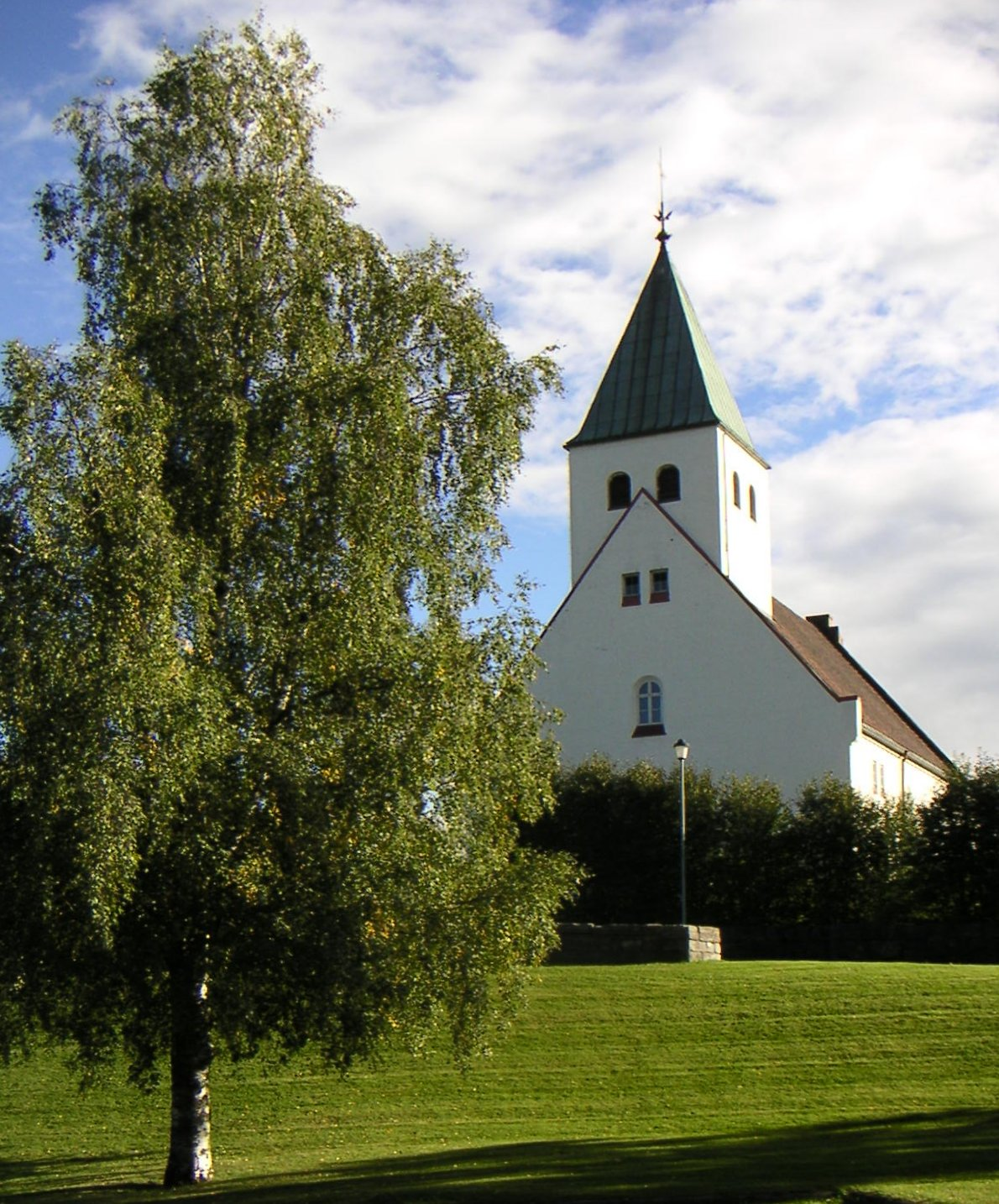
- View of the local church
- Interactive map of Raufoss
- Location within Innlandet Location within Norway
- Coordinates: 60.72604°N 10.6133°E
- Country: Norway
- Region: Eastern Norway
- County: Innlandet
- District: Toten
- Municipality: Vestre Toten Municipality
- Established as
- Town (By): 2019

Area
  - Total: 7.12 km^{2} (2.75 sq mi)
- Elevation: 320 m (1,050 ft)

Population (2022)
  - Total: 7,918
  - Density: 1,112/km^{2} (2,880/sq mi)
- Time zone: UTC+01:00 (CET)
  - Summer (DST): UTC+02:00 (CEST)
- Post Code: 2830 Raufoss

Raufoss is a town in Vestre Toten Municipality in Innlandet county, Norway. The town is the administrative centre of the municipality. It is located about 10 kilometres (6.2 mi) south of the larger town of Gjøvik. The town is located along the municipal border with the neighboring Gjøvik Municipality and the actual urban area of Raufoss does cross the border slightly, including a small part of Gjøvik as well (as defined by Statistics Norway).

The 7.12-square-kilometre (1,760-acre) town had a population (2022) of 7,918 and a population density of 1,112 inhabitants per square kilometre (2,880/sq mi). Since 2022, the population and area data for this town area has not been separately tracked by Statistics Norway and instead it has been considered part of the urban area for the town of Gjøvik.

The village of Raufoss was given town status in 2019.

== Etymology ==
The town is named after a waterfall in the river Hunnselva. The first element is raud which means "red", and the last element is foss which means "waterfall". The color red indicates traces of iron in the river bed.

== Economic and cultural activities ==
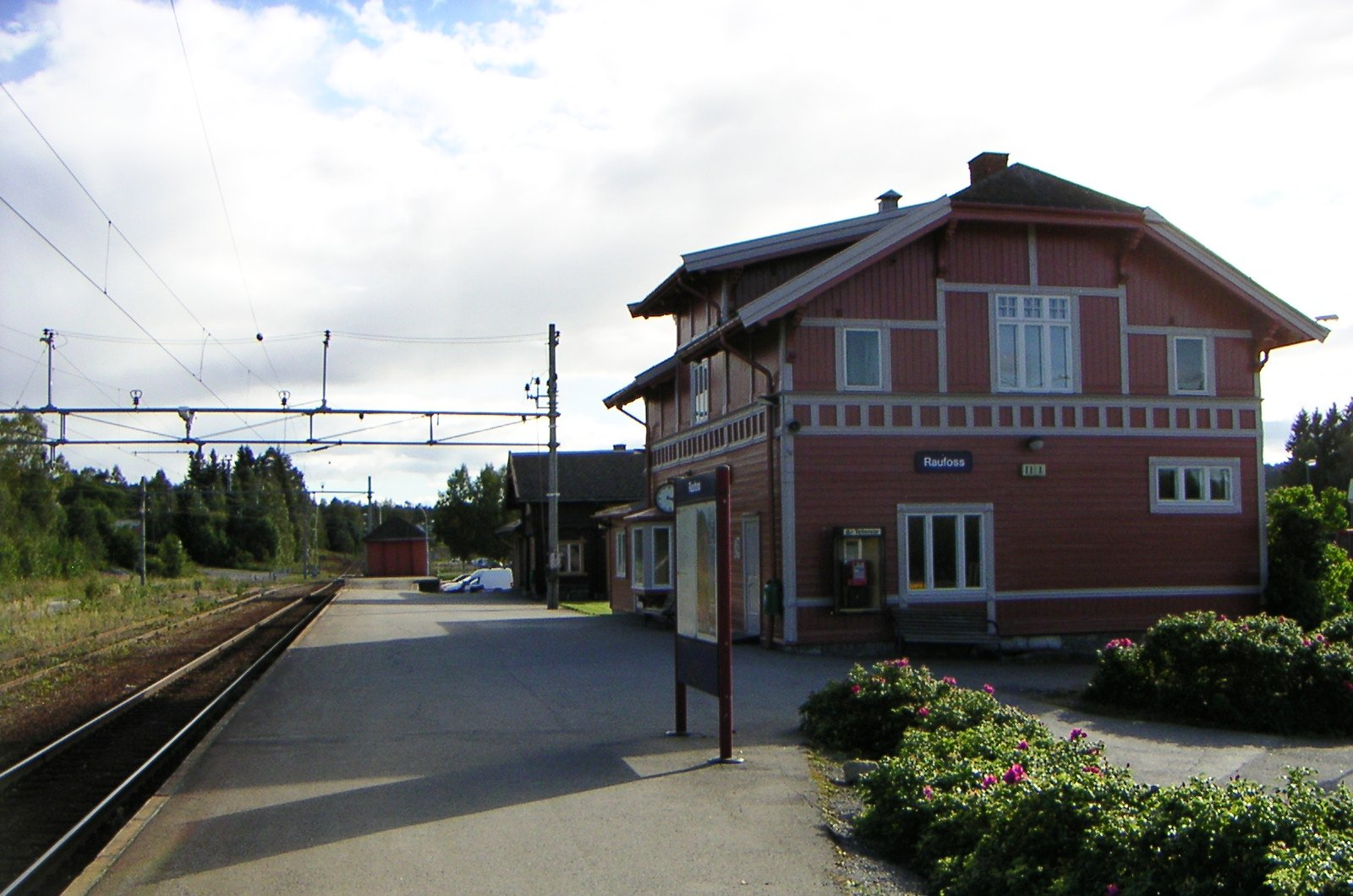
Raufoss railroad station

The largest employer is what was earlier Raufoss Ammunisjonsfabrikker, now split into several sub companies. These include Nammo, Hydro Aluminium and Raufoss Technology.

Raufoss is also the second to last stop on the Gjøvikbanen railway line. The station also has a local bus service.

The community has an active sports community pivoting around the sports club Raufoss I.L. where the football team has been the most prominent part of the club. Raufoss Fotball currently plays in Norwegian 1st Division.

In addition to sports, Raufoss has an active music community which has fostered such musicians as Ronni Le Tekrø of rock band TNT (band).

== See also ==
- List of towns and cities in Norway
