= Vestre Toten Municipality =

Municipality in Innlandet, Norway

Vestre Toten Municipality Vestre Toten kommune
- Municipality
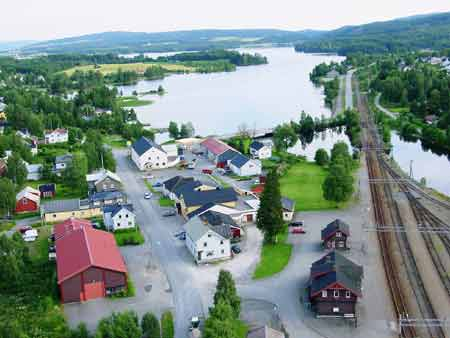
- View of the village of Eina

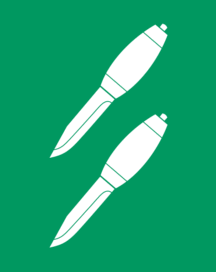
- Flag Coat of arms

- Innlandet within Norway

- Vestre Toten within Innlandet
- Coordinates: 60°39′10″N 10°35′46″E
- Country: Norway
- County: Innlandet
- District: Toten
- Established: 1 Jan 1838
  - Created as: Formannskapsdistrikt
- Administrative centre: Raufoss

Government
  - Mayor (2023): Tonje Bergum Jahr (Ap)

Area
  - Total: 250.7 km^{2} (96.8 sq mi)
  - Land: 232.53 km^{2} (89.78 sq mi)
  - Water: 18.17 km^{2} (7.02 sq mi) 7.2%
  - Rank: #288 in Norway
- Highest elevation: 722.66 m (2,370.9 ft)

Population (2025)
  - Total: 13,649
  - Rank: #90 in Norway
  - Density: 54.4/km^{2} (141/sq mi)
  - Change (10 years): ▲ +4.7%
- Demonym: Vestretotning

Official language
  - Norwegian form: Bokmål
- Time zone: UTC+01:00 (CET)
  - Summer (DST): UTC+02:00 (CEST)
- ISO 3166 code: NO-3443
- Website: Official website

Vestre Toten is a municipality in Innlandet county, Norway. It is located in the traditional district of Toten. The administrative centre of the municipality is the village of Raufoss. Other villages in the municipality include Bøverbru, Eina, and Reinsvoll.

The 250.7-square-kilometre (96.8 sq mi) municipality is the 288th largest by area out of the 357 municipalities in Norway. Vestre Toten Municipality is the 90th most populous municipality in Norway with a population of 13,649. The municipality's population density is 54.4 inhabitants per square kilometre (141/sq mi) and its population has increased by 4.7% over the previous 10-year period.

== General information ==
Vestre Toten was established as a municipality on 1 January 1838 (see formannskapsdistrikt law). On 1 January 1875, there was a border adjustment between Østre Toten Municipality and Vestre Toten Municipality. On 1 January 1908, the municipality was divided into three parts: Kolbu Municipality (population: 2,412) in the southeast, Eina Municipality (population: 1,173) in the southwest, and Vestre Toten Municipality (population: 4,027) in the north.

During the 1960s, there were many municipal mergers across Norway due to the work of the Schei Committee. On 1 January 1964, the following areas were merged to form a new, larger Vestre Toten Municipality:

- all of the old Vestre Toten Municipality (population: 9,113)
- the Sørligrenda area of Vardal Municipality (population: 87)
- all of the old Eina Municipality (population: 1,591)
- the area on the south end of the lake Einavatnet from Gran Municipality (population: 12)

Historically, this municipality was part of the old Oppland county. On 1 January 2020, the municipality became a part of the newly-formed Innlandet county (after Hedmark and Oppland counties were merged).

=== Name ===
The municipality is named Vestre Toten after the district of Toten (Old Norse: Þótn). The name is identical with the word Þótn which has an uncertain meaning, but it might be from the word þóttr which means "the pleasant district" or "something one likes". The parish of Toten was divided into two parts (eastern and western) in 1825 and the first word, vestre was added to signify that this was the "western" part, thus the name was Vestre Toten which means "(the) western (part of) Toten".

=== Coat of arms ===
The coat of arms was granted on 3 May 1991. The official blazon is "Vert, two knives argent in bend sinister points to base dexter" (Norwegian: I grønt to sølv kniver skråstilt venstre-høyre). This means the arms have a green field (background) and the charge is two knives that are lined up diagonally (specifically a special locally-produced knife known as a Toten knife). The charge has a tincture of argent which means it is commonly colored white, but if it is made out of metal, then silver is used. The green color in the field symbolizes the local forests and agriculture and the knife was chosen since the area has a long tradition of wood carving and knife making. The arms were designed by Inge Rotevatn. The municipal flag has the same design as the coat of arms.

=== Churches ===
The Church of Norway has three parishes (sokn) within Vestre Toten Municipality. It is part of the Toten prosti (deanery) in the Diocese of Hamar.

Churches in Vestre Toten Municipality
Parish (sokn)	Church name	Location of the church	Year built
Eina	Eina Church	Eina	1890
Raufoss	Raufoss Church	Raufoss	1939
Ås	Ås Church	Bøverbru	1921

== Geography ==
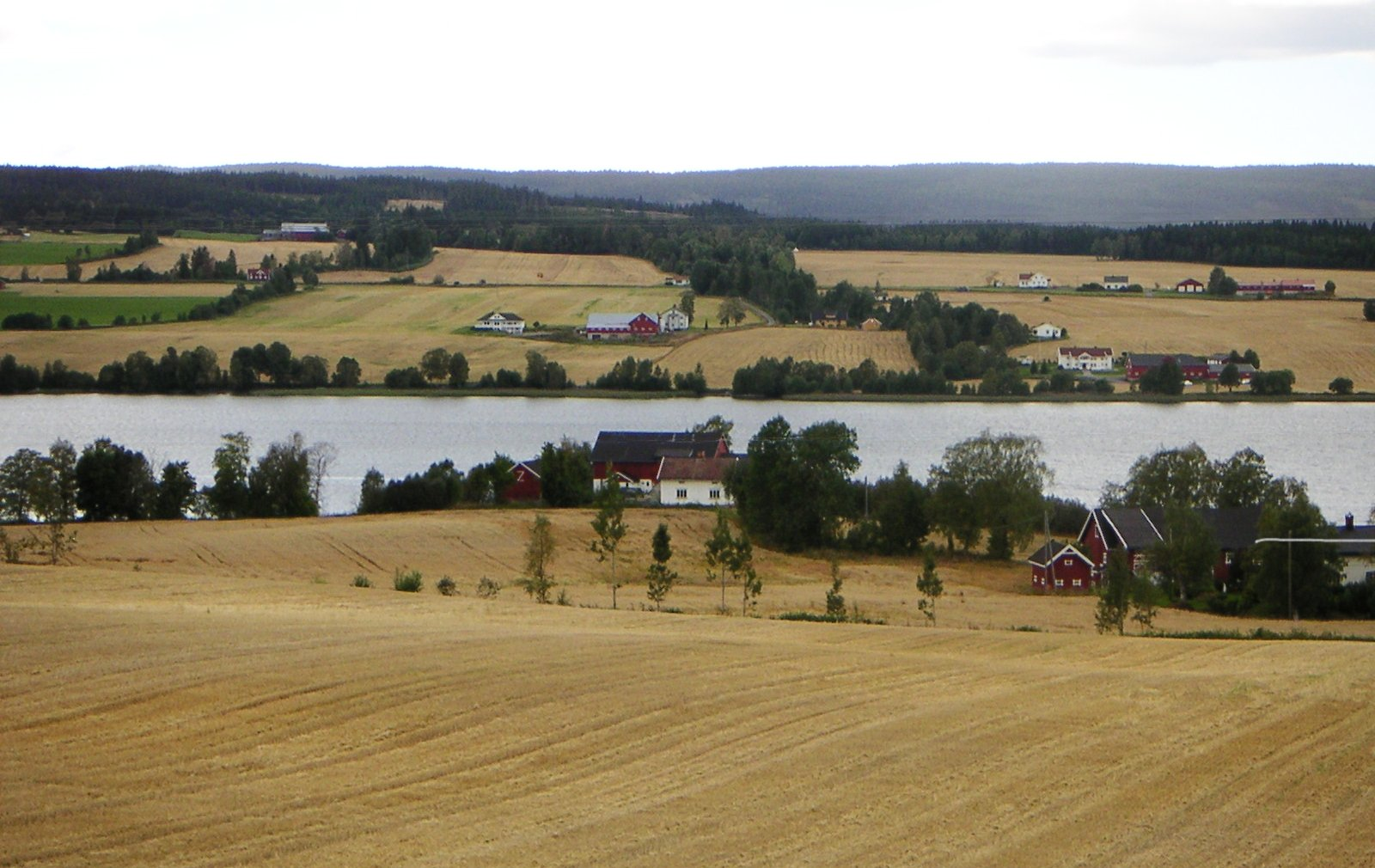
Einavatnet lake and farmland

Vestre Toten Municipality is located along the large lake Mjøsa. The municipality is bordered by Østre Toten Municipality to the east, Gjøvik Municipality to the north, Søndre Land Municipality to the west, and Gran Municipality to the southwest.

The highest point in the municipality is the 722.66-metre (2,370.9 ft) tall mountain Lauvhøgda. The Hunnselva river runs through the lake Einavatnet and flows through the whole municipality before going into Gjøvik where it empties into the large lake Mjøsa.

== History ==
Number of minorities (1st and 2nd generation) in Vestre Toten by country of origin in 2017
Ancestry	Number
Poland	139
Lithuania	104
Iraq	67
Thailand	61
Iran	58
Eritrea	52
Turkey	49
Philippines	44
Somalia	37
Syria	36

According to the sagas, Halfdan Hvitbeinn (Whiteleg) was the first Yngling in Norway. He conquered Romerike, part of Hedmark, part of Vestfold, and Toten. He was killed in Toten around the year 740.

In 1021, according to saga, King Olaf (reigned 1015–1028) converted Toten to Christianity. Also, King Håkon IV (reigned 1217–1263) came to Toten around the year 1226 to settle local unrest.

Christian II (1481–1559) was a Danish monarch and King of Denmark and Norway from 1513 to 1523 and also the King of Sweden from 1520 to 1521, under the Kalmar Union. Prior to becoming king, Duke Christian was sent to Norway in 1506 by John II (also called Hans), King of Norway (1483–1513) to take charge of the kingdom. In 1507, he became aware of a revolt in Hedmark. In early 1508, he took a force there, routing the rebellion. He then rowed across lake Mjøsa to Toten, capturing residents, imprisoning them in the vaulted cellar of the rectory in Østre Toten and torturing them there. As a result, he determined that Bishop Karl of Hamar had been behind the rebellion. With Bishop Karl as his captive, he was able to suppress the unrest.

Toten was a part of Akershus county until 1756, when it became part of Christians county. Lauritz Weidemann, Corporal Peder Balke, and Nels Dyhren from Toten attended the 1814 constitutional convention at Eidsvoll Manor.

== Government ==
Vestre Toten Municipality is responsible for primary education (through 10th grade), outpatient health services, senior citizen services, welfare and other social services, zoning, economic development, and municipal roads and utilities. The municipality is governed by a municipal council of directly elected representatives. The mayor is indirectly elected by a vote of the municipal council. The municipality is under the jurisdiction of the Vestoppland og Valdres District Court and the Eidsivating Court of Appeal.

=== Municipal council ===
The municipal council (Kommunestyre) of Vestre Toten Municipality is made up of 31 representatives that are elected to four year terms. The tables below show the current and historical composition of the council by political party.

Vestre Toten kommunestyre 2023–2027
Party name (in Norwegian)	Number of representatives
Labour Party (Arbeiderpartiet)	11
Progress Party (Fremskrittspartiet)	4
Conservative Party (Høyre)	7
Christian Democratic Party (Kristelig Folkeparti)	1
Red Party (Rødt)	1
Centre Party (Senterpartiet)	5
Socialist Left Party (Sosialistisk Venstreparti)	1
Liberal Party (Venstre)	1
Total number of members:	31

Vestre Toten kommunestyre 2019–2023
Party name (in Norwegian)	Number of representatives
Labour Party (Arbeiderpartiet)	13
Progress Party (Fremskrittspartiet)	3
Green Party (Miljøpartiet De Grønne)	1
Conservative Party (Høyre)	5
Red Party (Rødt)	1
Centre Party (Senterpartiet)	7
Socialist Left Party (Sosialistisk Venstreparti)	1
Total number of members:	31

Vestre Toten kommunestyre 2015–2019
Party name (in Norwegian)	Number of representatives
Labour Party (Arbeiderpartiet)	13
Progress Party (Fremskrittspartiet)	3
Green Party (Miljøpartiet De Grønne)	1
Conservative Party (Høyre)	6
Christian Democratic Party (Kristelig Folkeparti)	1
Red Party (Rødt)	1
Centre Party (Senterpartiet)	4
Socialist Left Party (Sosialistisk Venstreparti)	1
Liberal Party (Venstre)	1
Total number of members:	31

Vestre Toten kommunestyre 2011–2015
Party name (in Norwegian)	Number of representatives
Labour Party (Arbeiderpartiet)	15
Progress Party (Fremskrittspartiet)	3
Conservative Party (Høyre)	6
Christian Democratic Party (Kristelig Folkeparti)	1
Centre Party (Senterpartiet)	4
Socialist Left Party (Sosialistisk Venstreparti)	1
Liberal Party (Venstre)	1
Total number of members:	31

Vestre Toten kommunestyre 2007–2011
Party name (in Norwegian)	Number of representatives
Labour Party (Arbeiderpartiet)	15
Progress Party (Fremskrittspartiet)	6
Conservative Party (Høyre)	3
Christian Democratic Party (Kristelig Folkeparti)	1
Centre Party (Senterpartiet)	4
Socialist Left Party (Sosialistisk Venstreparti)	1
Liberal Party (Venstre)	1
Total number of members:	31

Vestre Toten kommunestyre 2003–2007
Party name (in Norwegian)	Number of representatives
Labour Party (Arbeiderpartiet)	12
Progress Party (Fremskrittspartiet)	6
Conservative Party (Høyre)	3
Christian Democratic Party (Kristelig Folkeparti)	1
Centre Party (Senterpartiet)	3
Socialist Left Party (Sosialistisk Venstreparti)	5
Liberal Party (Venstre)	1
Total number of members:	31

Vestre Toten kommunestyre 1999–2003
Party name (in Norwegian)	Number of representatives
Labour Party (Arbeiderpartiet)	14
Progress Party (Fremskrittspartiet)	4
Conservative Party (Høyre)	4
Christian Democratic Party (Kristelig Folkeparti)	2
Centre Party (Senterpartiet)	5
Socialist Left Party (Sosialistisk Venstreparti)	2
Total number of members:	31

Vestre Toten kommunestyre 1995–1999
Party name (in Norwegian)	Number of representatives
Labour Party (Arbeiderpartiet)	15
Progress Party (Fremskrittspartiet)	3
Conservative Party (Høyre)	4
Christian Democratic Party (Kristelig Folkeparti)	2
Centre Party (Senterpartiet)	5
Socialist Left Party (Sosialistisk Venstreparti)	1
Liberal Party (Venstre)	1
Total number of members:	31

Vestre Toten kommunestyre 1991–1995
Party name (in Norwegian)	Number of representatives
Labour Party (Arbeiderpartiet)	20
Progress Party (Fremskrittspartiet)	2
Conservative Party (Høyre)	5
Christian Democratic Party (Kristelig Folkeparti)	2
Centre Party (Senterpartiet)	6
Socialist Left Party (Sosialistisk Venstreparti)	5
Liberal Party (Venstre)	1
Total number of members:	41

Vestre Toten kommunestyre 1987–1991
Party name (in Norwegian)	Number of representatives
Labour Party (Arbeiderpartiet)	24
Progress Party (Fremskrittspartiet)	4
Conservative Party (Høyre)	5
Christian Democratic Party (Kristelig Folkeparti)	2
Centre Party (Senterpartiet)	3
Socialist Left Party (Sosialistisk Venstreparti)	2
Liberal Party (Venstre)	1
Total number of members:	41

Vestre Toten kommunestyre 1983–1987
Party name (in Norwegian)	Number of representatives
Labour Party (Arbeiderpartiet)	27
Progress Party (Fremskrittspartiet)	2
Conservative Party (Høyre)	5
Christian Democratic Party (Kristelig Folkeparti)	2
Centre Party (Senterpartiet)	3
Socialist Left Party (Sosialistisk Venstreparti)	1
Liberal Party (Venstre)	1
Total number of members:	41

Vestre Toten kommunestyre 1979–1983
Party name (in Norwegian)	Number of representatives
Labour Party (Arbeiderpartiet)	26
Conservative Party (Høyre)	6
Christian Democratic Party (Kristelig Folkeparti)	3
Centre Party (Senterpartiet)	4
Socialist Left Party (Sosialistisk Venstreparti)	1
Liberal Party (Venstre)	1
Total number of members:	41

Vestre Toten kommunestyre 1975–1979
Party name (in Norwegian)	Number of representatives
Labour Party (Arbeiderpartiet)	25
Conservative Party (Høyre)	3
Christian Democratic Party (Kristelig Folkeparti)	4
Centre Party (Senterpartiet)	6
Socialist Left Party (Sosialistisk Venstreparti)	2
Liberal Party (Venstre)	1
Total number of members:	41

Vestre Toten kommunestyre 1971–1975
Party name (in Norwegian)	Number of representatives
Labour Party (Arbeiderpartiet)	26
Conservative Party (Høyre)	2
Christian Democratic Party (Kristelig Folkeparti)	3
Centre Party (Senterpartiet)	6
Socialist People's Party (Sosialistisk Folkeparti)	3
Liberal Party (Venstre)	1
Total number of members:	41

Vestre Toten kommunestyre 1967–1971
Party name (in Norwegian)	Number of representatives
Labour Party (Arbeiderpartiet)	25
Conservative Party (Høyre)	2
Christian Democratic Party (Kristelig Folkeparti)	3
Centre Party (Senterpartiet)	6
Socialist People's Party (Sosialistisk Folkeparti)	3
Liberal Party (Venstre)	2
Total number of members:	41

Vestre Toten kommunestyre 1963–1967
Party name (in Norwegian)	Number of representatives
Labour Party (Arbeiderpartiet)	26
Conservative Party (Høyre)	3
Communist Party (Kommunistiske Parti)	1
Christian Democratic Party (Kristelig Folkeparti)	3
Centre Party (Senterpartiet)	6
Liberal Party (Venstre)	2
Total number of members:	41
Note: On 1 January 1964, Eina Municipality and parts of Gran Municipality and Vardal Municipality became part of Vestre Toten Municipality.

Vestre Toten herredsstyre 1959–1963
Party name (in Norwegian)	Number of representatives
Labour Party (Arbeiderpartiet)	19
Conservative Party (Høyre)	2
Communist Party (Kommunistiske Parti)	1
Christian Democratic Party (Kristelig Folkeparti)	3
Centre Party (Senterpartiet)	3
Liberal Party (Venstre)	1
Total number of members:	29

Vestre Toten herredsstyre 1955–1959
Party name (in Norwegian)	Number of representatives
Labour Party (Arbeiderpartiet)	18
Conservative Party (Høyre)	1
Communist Party (Kommunistiske Parti)	2
Christian Democratic Party (Kristelig Folkeparti)	3
Farmers' Party (Bondepartiet)	3
Liberal Party (Venstre)	2
Total number of members:	29

Vestre Toten herredsstyre 1951–1955
Party name (in Norwegian)	Number of representatives
Labour Party (Arbeiderpartiet)	12
Communist Party (Kommunistiske Parti)	1
Christian Democratic Party (Kristelig Folkeparti)	2
Joint List(s) of Non-Socialist Parties (Borgerlige Felleslister)	5
Total number of members:	20

Vestre Toten herredsstyre 1947–1951
Party name (in Norwegian)	Number of representatives
Labour Party (Arbeiderpartiet)	10
Communist Party (Kommunistiske Parti)	2
Christian Democratic Party (Kristelig Folkeparti)	2
Farmers' Party (Bondepartiet)	3
Liberal Party (Venstre)	3
Total number of members:	20

Vestre Toten herredsstyre 1945–1947
Party name (in Norwegian)	Number of representatives
Labour Party (Arbeiderpartiet)	10
Communist Party (Kommunistiske Parti)	3
Christian Democratic Party (Kristelig Folkeparti)	2
Farmers' Party (Bondepartiet)	3
Liberal Party (Venstre)	2
Total number of members:	20

Vestre Toten herredsstyre 1937–1940*
Party name (in Norwegian)	Number of representatives
Labour Party (Arbeiderpartiet)	11
Radical People's Party (Radikale Folkepartiet)	4
Farmers' Party (Bondepartiet)	5
Total number of members:	20
Note: Due to the German occupation of Norway during World War II, no elections were held for new municipal councils until after the war ended in 1945.

=== Mayors ===
The mayor (Norwegian: ordfører) of Vestre Toten Municipality is the political leader of the municipality and the chairperson of the municipal council. Here is a list of people who have held this position:

- 1838–1843: Peder Tollefsen Hallingstad
- 1844–1845: Johannes Johannessen Westrum
- 1846–1847: Hans Lemmich Juell
- 1848–1853: Wilhelm Christian Magelssen
- 1854–1855: Christian Eilert Heyerdahl
- 1856–1857: Johannes Johannessen Westrum
- 1858–1865: Christian Grønland
- 1866–1871: Lars Christiansen Blilie
- 1872–1885: Ole Christian Præstesæter
- 1886–1890: Peder Olsen Hohle
- 1890–1891: L. A. Grefsrud
- 1892–1893: Anton Jørgensen Røstøen
- 1894–1895: Ole Christian Præstesæter
- 1896–1901: Anton Jørgensen Røstøen
- 1902–1907: Mathias Blilie (LL)
- 1908–1916: Olav Larsson Gjørvad (AD)
- 1917–1922: Peder Markus Hansen Nauf (AD)
- 1923–1940: Severin Olsen (Ap)
- 1940–1942: Hans Henrik Petersen (NS)
- 1942–1945: Ole Thorsrud (NS)
- 1945–1945: Severin Olsen (Ap)
- 1946–1951: Helge Sunde (Ap)
- 1952–1955: Hans J. Kjelsberg (Ap)
- 1956–1979: Sigurd Østlien (Ap)
- 1980–1995: Svein Erik Strandlie (Ap)
- 1995–2011: Stein Knutsen (Ap)
- 2011–2019: Leif Waarum (Ap)
- 2019–2023: Stian Olafsen (Ap)
- 2023–present: Tonje Bergum Jahr (Ap)

== Economy ==
Farming and industry are important. Raufoss Aluminum is a major employer in the community. The Gjøvikbanen railway line passes through the community.

== Notable people ==
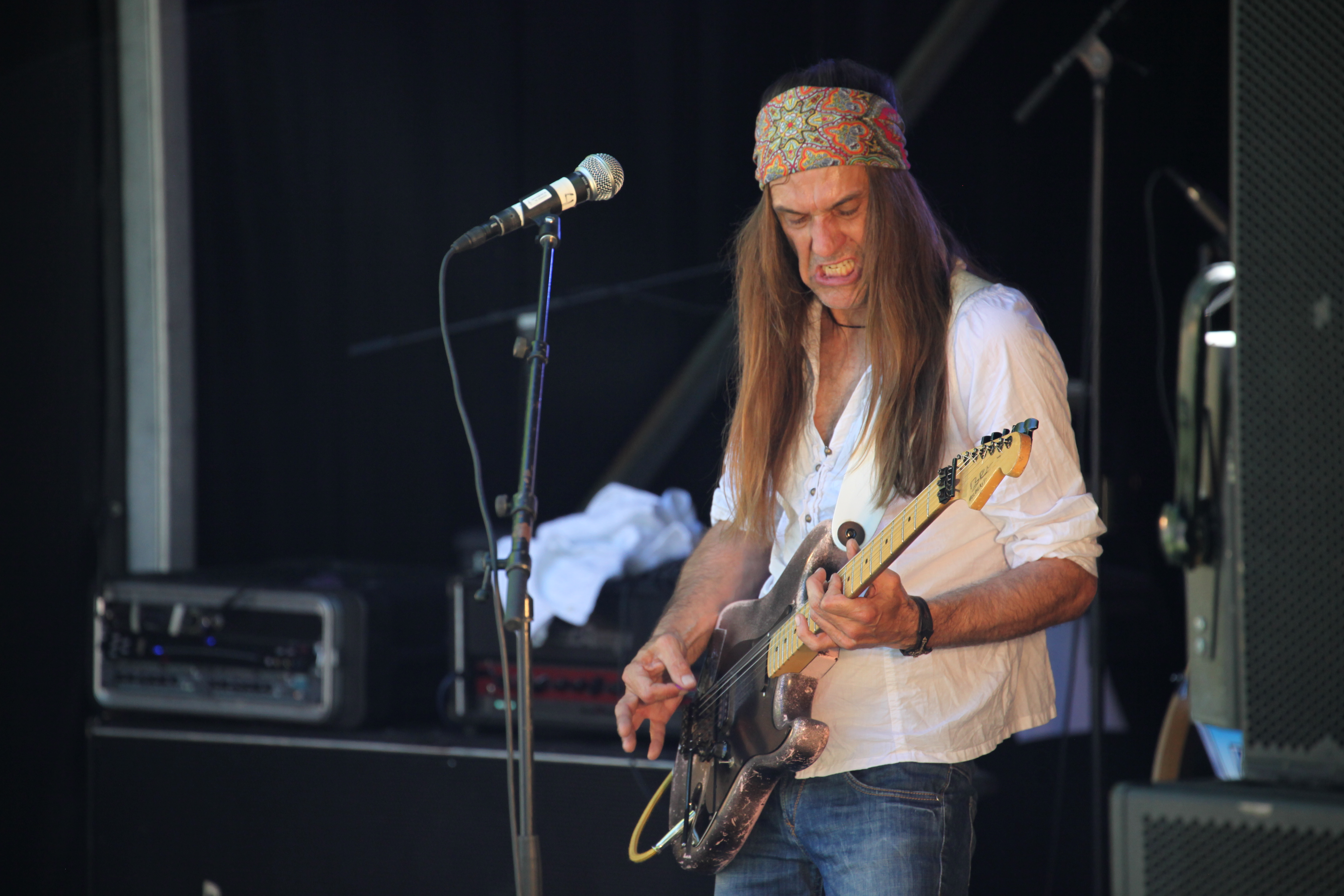
Ronni Le Tekrø & TNT, 2012

- Frøis Frøisland (1883 in Raufoss – 1930), a Norwegian newspaper correspondent and editor
- Karsten Gaarder (1902 in Vestre Toten – 1980), a Justice of the Supreme Court of Norway
- Halfdan Hegtun (1918–2012), a radio personality, comedian, writer, and former politician
- Aud Blegen Svindland (1928 in Vestre Toten – 2019), a physician and women's rights activist
- Ronni Le Tekrø (born 1963), a guitarist with hard rock band TNT who lives in Raufoss
- Bente Nordby (born 1974 in Raufoss), a former Norwegian football goalkeeper with 172 caps for Norway women
