= Toten =

District of Norway

Coordinates: 60.6782°N 10.7482°E

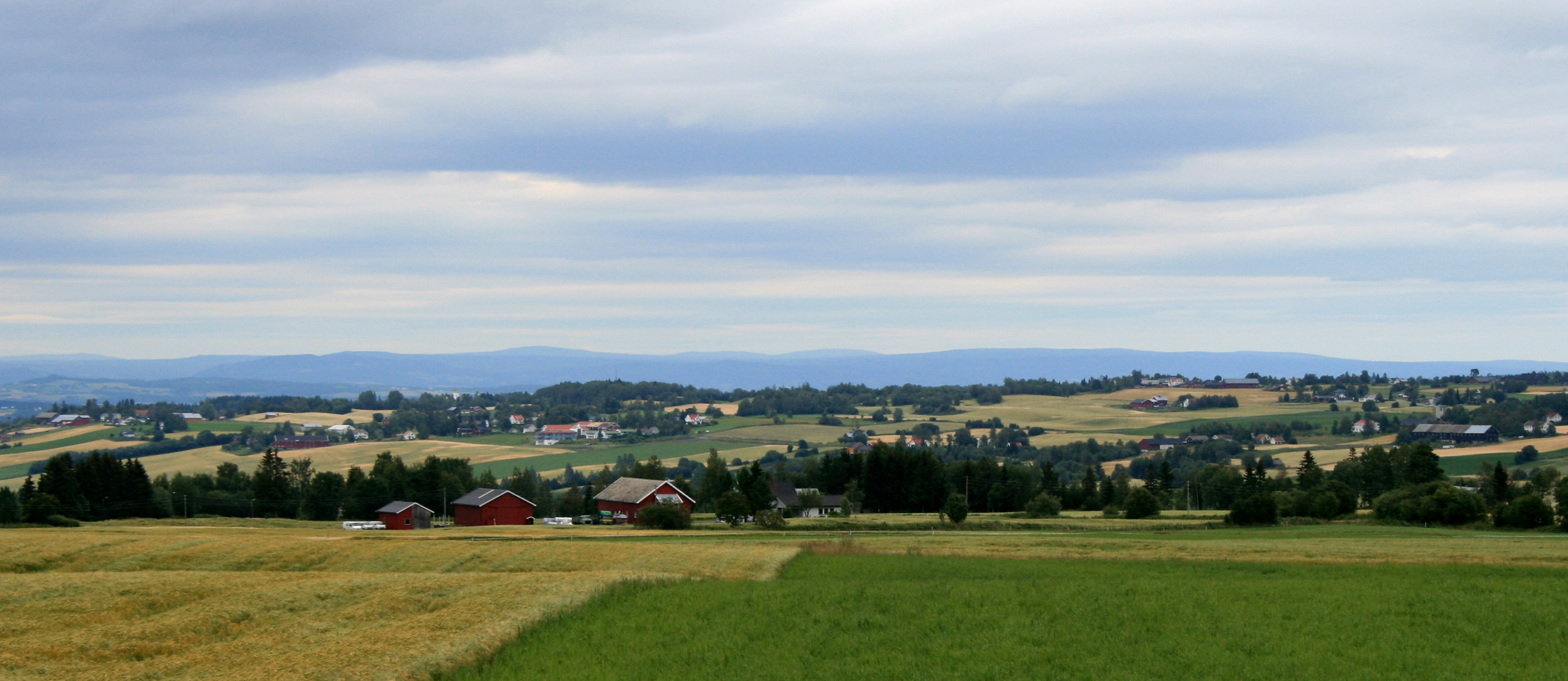
Østre Toten in 2007

Toten is a traditional district in Innlandet county in the eastern part of Norway. It consists of Østre Toten Municipality and Vestre Toten Municipality.

The combined population of Toten is approximately 27,000. The largest urban area is the town of Raufoss with approximately 6,000 inhabitants. In the mostly rural Østre Toten Municipality, the village of Lena is the biggest settlement with approximately 1,100 inhabitants.

Agriculture is an integral aspect of the economy of Toten. The agricultural focus lies mostly in Østre Toten Municipality, whereas Vestre Toten Municipality is a center for industry. In Toten, large forest areas can be found. These are important recreational areas, and serve as popular hunting and fishing grounds. The forests are hosts to moose and deer as well as small game such as rabbits and fowl. There are plenty of smaller lakes in which fish such as char, perch, pike and trout can be found.

The highest point in Østre Toten Municipality is Torseterkampen at 841 metres (2,759 ft) above sea level and the highest point in Vestre Toten Municipality is Lauvhøgda at 722 metres (2,369 ft) above sea level.

== Dialect ==
The dialect spoken in Toten is North-East Norwegian. It has preserved some archaic elements, such as the dative case (einn hæst - hæst`n, hæstér - hæstá in the nominative case, but hæstà - hæstóm in the dative case). A characteristic of North-East Norwegian dialects is that feminine nouns may end in -u or -o, and masculine nouns may end in -a or -å. Infinitives end in -e, -a and -å.
