= Sogn (disambiguation) =

Sogn is a traditional district in Western Norway.

Sogn may also refer to:

- Sogn (parish), an administrative unit in Denmark
- Sogn, Minnesota, an unincorporated community in Warsaw Township, Goodhue County
- Sogn, Oslo, a former district of Oslo, Norway
- Sogn Fjord, Norway
- Sogn og Fjordane (newspaper), a former Norwegian newspaper, named Sogn 1932–1936
- Karen Sogn (1931–2013), Norwegian politician

== See also ==
- Crap Sogn Gion, a mountain and cable car station in Switzerland
- Sogn Avis, a Norwegian newspaper
- Sogn District Court, a former court in Sogndalsfjøra, Norway
- Sogn og Fjordane, a former county in western Norway
- Sogn og Fjordane Art Museum, Førde, Norway
- Sogn og Fjordane County Municipality, Norway
- Sogn og Fjordane District Court, Førde, Norway
- Sogn og Fjordane Energi, a Norwegian power company
- Sogn og Fjordane Teater, a theatre in Førde, Norway
- Sogn og Fjordane University College, Norway
- Sogn Parcazi Castle and Church, Switzerland
- Sogn Studentby, a residential area for students in Oslo, Norway
- Sogn Upper Secondary School, a former school in Oslo, Norway
- Sogn-A-Song, a 1996 album by Karl Seglem
- Sogndal (disambiguation)
- Sogns Tidend, a former Norwegian newspaper
