= SS Kommandøren =

Norwegian passenger/cargo steamship

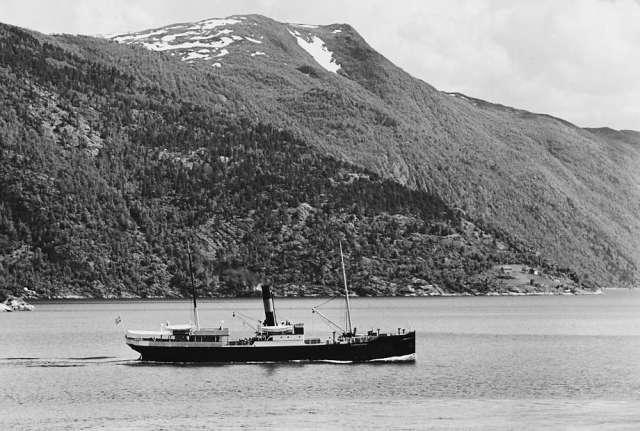
- Kommandøren leaving Balestrand in 1936

History
- Name: Kommandøren
- Namesake: Kommandørkaptein Hugo Lous
- Owner: Nordre Bergenhus Amts Dampskibe
- Port of registry: Bergen
- Route: Bergen-Sogn og Fjordane
- Builder: Akers Mekaniske Værksted, Kristiania, Norway
- Cost: 264,000 kr
- Yard number: 132
- Completed: 30 June 1891
- Maiden voyage: 5 July 1891
- Identification: Code letters: LEGO; (1944)
- Fate: Sunk by a Kriegsmarine torpedo boat in Bergen harbour, on 29 March 1945. Wreck raised in April 1946, and sold for scrap in November that year.

General characteristics
- Type: Passenger/cargo ship (1891–1945); Troop ship (1892, 1940)
- Tonnage: As built: 433 gross register tons (GRT); By 1930: 543 GRT; (315 net register tons (NRT))
- Length: 49.3 metres (162 ft)
- Beam: 7.3 metres (24 ft)
- Draught: 3.9 metres (13 ft)
- Decks: 2
- Installed power: 600 indicated horsepower; 116 nominal horsepower
- Propulsion: 3-cylinder triple expansion steam engine
- Speed: 12 knots (22 km/h; 14 mph)
- Capacity: 249 passengers

SS Kommandøren was a steel-hulled passenger/cargo steamship built in Norway in 1891. She served as a communications link between the regional capital of Western Norway, Bergen, and the various communities of Sogn og Fjordane county.

Following the 9 April 1940 German invasion of Norway, she was requisitioned by the Norwegian authorities and carried troops for the Norwegian war effort until the forces in Western Norway ceased fighting on 2 May 1940.

After a brief stint in German service, she returned to her civilian duties later in 1940, and was accidentally torpedoed and sunk by a German E-boat in Bergen on 29 March 1945.

== Construction and characteristics ==
Kommandøren was one of four passenger/cargo steamships built for Nordre Bergenhus Amts Dampskibe at Norwegian shipyards around the turn of the 20th century. The four ships were constructed to supplement four smaller vessels built decades earlier at British shipyards. In addition to Kommandøren, which was seen as the flagship of the company's fleet, Lærdal, Balder and Stavenes were built between 1876 and 1904. The company sailed on cargo/passenger routes in Western Norway. Kommandøren was the largest of the new-builds, and was considered the grandest of the company vessels.

Delivered on 30 June 1891, Kommandøren was yard number 132 at Akers Mekaniske Værksted in Kristiania (modern-day Oslo), Norway. The steel-hulled ship measured 433 gross register tons (GRT), had a length of 50.8 metres (167 ft), a beam of 7.5 metres (25 ft) and a draught of 3.9 metres (13 ft). Her 600 indicated horsepower/116 nominal horsepower 3-cylinder triple expansion steam engine could propel the ship at 12 knots (22 km/h; 14 mph). Kommandøren cost the company 264,000 kr to build and could take up to 249 passengers.

Although much newer than the first ships operated by Nordre Bergenhus Amts Dampskibe, Kommandøren and the three other ships were only around 2 knots (3.7 km/h; 2.3 mph) faster than the mid-19th century vessels used by the company.

The new ship was named Kommandøren by Nordre Bergenhus amt county council, after the affectionate nickname of the county's shipping company's first executive director, Hugo Lous, who had held the rank of kommandørkaptein (English: commander) in the Royal Norwegian Navy. To name the new ship after the executive director was an unusual decision, as most Norwegian ships of the era were named after place names, historical figures or royalty.

Built not only to carry people and cargo between the towns and villages of Western Norway, but also for the tourist trade, Kommandøren was fitted with a comparatively luxurious first class section. The 10-cabin, 36-bed, first class featured a smoking salon, a women's salon and a dining salon for the first class passengers and ship officers. A promenade deck gave views in all directions. The third class passengers had two salons, one on the main deck and one on the orlop (lowest) deck. On Kommandøren, the third class section was expanded and improved in comparison with earlier vessels, after complaints from passengers to the county council. The third class section of Kommandøren was described by the newspaper Sogns Tidende as "large, spacious and almost comfortably equipped. Kommandøren was home ported in Bergen. She had her maiden passenger voyage from Bergen to Sogn on 5 July 1891.

== Passenger/cargo and tourist service ==
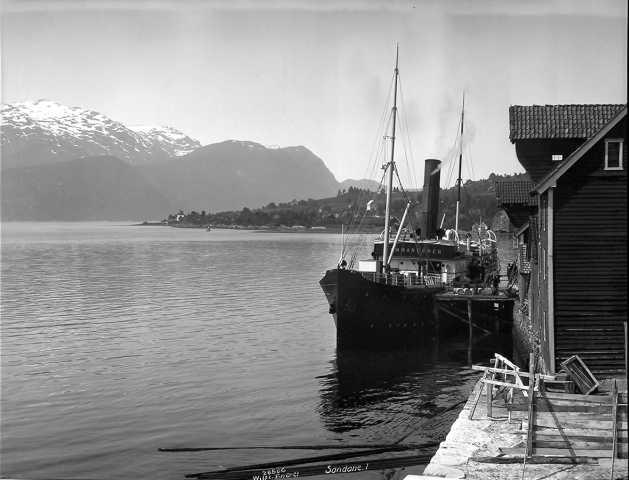
Kommandøren at anchor in Sandane in 1926

In the summer season, Kommandøren served the tourist trade in Sogn, while she sailed the regular passenger/cargo routes during the winter months. Kommandøren was generally used as an express route ship, often carrying patients on their way to treatment. Amongst the cargo carried by was often live animals, including horses, cattle and sheep. During one of her trips, Kommandøren ran aground on 20 October 1900 near Tjugum in Balestrand Municipality. The ship was also at times employed to transport important dignitaries in the region, like she did in September 1920, when she brought politicians to Vik to inspect the area for a proposed railway project. Shortly after delivery, in September 1892, Kommandøren provided transport support to a large-scale Norwegian Army field exercise in Western Norway. She was tasked with transporting troops from Gudvangen to Lærdalsøyri after the completion of the exercises.

In 1910, Kommandøren was modernized at Stavanger Støberi & Dok in Stavanger, gaining a new boiler for the steam engine and being painted white. In January the next year, she ran aground at Rongevær in the Fensfjord. She ran aground again in 1913, in Herdlefjorden.

A rebuild in 1922 saw the ship's well deck built over, creating a flush deck profile. In 1930 the ship was refurbished and modernized. By this time, Kommandøren measured 543 GRT and 315 NRT.

On 27 August 1928, Kommandøren ran aground at Opdalseldet in Bårdsundet off Tysnesøya in Hordaland; she was refloated after all 350 passengers had been taken off. She ran aground yet again in April 1938, when she ran into the island Segløya while en route from Skjerjehamn to Eivindvik. The incident caused severe damage to the bottom of the hull.

== Second World War ==
=== Norwegian Campaign ===
==== Troop ship ====
When Norway was invaded by Nazi Germany on 9 April, Kommandøren was not in the areas immediately captured by the invading Germans. She was thus able to continue her service in the Sognefjord for much of the month of April 1940. On 9 April 1940, Kommandøren was en route to Bergen, but was stopped at Høyanger and ordered to Sogn to assist in the mobilization of Norwegian Army units to oppose the Germans.

Kommandøren was directed to transport troops from Dingja via several smaller villages to Nordeide and Gudvangen. Together with the steamer Gudvangen, she set out in the early morning of 10 April to retrieve troops. Kommandøren and the other ships of the company fleet were later praised by the regional police commander for their important role in the successful mobilization in Sogn og Fjordane.

==== Bombing in the Sognefjord ====
On 25 April 1940, Kommandøren steamed in the Sognefjord, carrying regular passengers, as well as a load of around 100 soldiers bound for Gudvangen and Voss for service with the Norwegian Army's 4th Division. The soldiers brought in that day belonged to an older age group not called up in the initial mobilization drive. While en route from Vik to Balestrand, the steamer was bombed and strafed by a German bomber. The bombs did not hit the ship, and the machine gun bullets only did minor damage and caused no casualties.

After calling at Balestrand, Kommandøren proceeded to Leikanger, where the soldiers on board disembarked. While Kommandøren was docked at Leikanger, the village was attacked by a German aircraft. The aircraft dropped 11 bombs in three series on the area, before strafing people and cars on the ground. Amongst the targets were the soldiers unloaded by Kommandøren, the troops being on the march to nearby Hermansverk. The attack killed a travelling salesman from Bergen outright, and wounded a 16-year-old local boy and the boy's mother, restaurateur Isak Roksvåg from Kommandøren and the ship's captain, Thorvald Johannessen. While on the way to hospital in Lærdalsøyri with Kommandøren, Captain Johannessen died from his wounds.

==== End of the campaign ====
For the remaining week of the fighting in South Norway, Kommandøren was docked at Kvamsøya, immobilized by a damaged axle. As part of the ceasefire agreement accepted by the Norwegians in Western Norway in the evening of 1 May 1940, Kommandøren was to be handed over to the Germans, along with the ferry Lærdal and 40 smaller boats. The transfer of the ships occurred at Lærdal on 2 May, and the ceasefire was announced on 3 May. The Germans used Kommandøren and the other vessels for a limited period to transport troops to occupy various places in Western Norway. When released by the Germans, Kommandøren was repaired before re-entering service.

=== During the German occupation ===
By the autumn of 1940, Kommandøren was back in regular service, providing an important link between Bergen and the smaller town and villages in the region. By 1944, Kommandøren had been assigned the code letters LEGO.

She remained in service until 8 February 1945, when she ran aground in the Alverstraumen narrows. Kommandøren remained aground for five weeks, and was filled by sea water before being salvaged and towed to Bergen to await repairs. Although the ship's hull was intact, the interior and engine were heavily water damaged.

=== Sinking ===
During the night of 29 March 1945, Kommandøren was docked at the remains of Søndre Nykirkekai in Bergen. (Note: Most of the quay Søndre Nykirkekai had been destroyed in the 1944 Vågen explosion less than a year previously.) At around 01:00 the ship was struck by one of two torpedoes accidentally fired by a German torpedo boat anchored on the opposite side of Vågen bay. The torpedo explosion threw debris from Kommandøren over a wide area, and left the ship lying on the harbour bed. Only the mast and a section of the bow remained above water. The midship and aft sections of the ship were completely destroyed by the torpedo. The only crew member on board at the time, Able Seaman Alf Larsen, was killed in the incident.

Before discovering that the incident had been caused by the accidental launch of two torpedoes by a drunken German crewman on the E-boat S-13, the German authorities in Bergen launched a search for saboteurs in the city. Kommandøren was the only total loss suffered by Fylkesbaatane i Sogn og Fjordane (the formerly named Nordre Bergenhus Amts Dampskibe) during the Second World War.

The wreck of Kommandøren was raised in April 1946 and towed to Kjøkkelvik in Askøy Municipality. Kommandøren was sold for scrap in November 1946.
