= Sæle =

Sæle may refer to:

== People ==
- Anita Apelthun Sæle, a Norwegian politician with the Christian Democratic Party
- Finn Jarle Sæle, a Norwegian editor, activist, theologian and former priest

== Places ==
- Sæle, Vestland, a village in Sogndal municipality in Vestland, Norway
- Sæle Church, a church in Sogndal municipality in Vestland, Norway
