= Kvamsøya =

Kvamsøya or Kvamsøy may refer to the following:

- Kvamsøya, Vestland, an island in Alver Municipality in Vestland county, Norway
- Kvamsøy, Kvam, an island in Kvam Municipality in Vestland county, Norway
- Kvamsøya, Møre og Romsdal, an island in Sande municipality in Møre og Romsdal county, Norway
- Kvamsøy, Sogndal, an island in Sogndal municipality in Vestland county, Norway
- Kvamsøy Church, a historic parish church in Sogndal municipality in Vestland county, Norway

== See also ==
- Kvamsøyna, an island in Masfjorden Municipality in Vestland county, Norway
