= Ivar Tveit =

Norwegian newspaper editor (1880–1952)

Ivar Tveit (18 September 1880 – 1952) was a Norwegian newspaper editor.

He hailed from Hyllestad Municipality. He edited the newspaper Velgeren from 1907 to 1925, then from 1927 Sogns Avis in Vikøyri. In 1932 he started the newspaper Sogn in Leikanger, renamed Sogn og Fjordane in 1936. He edited the newspaper until 1947, except for a period during the occupation of Norway by Nazi Germany when he had to flee to Sweden. The newspaper belonged to the Agrarian Party.

Tveit was also a member of the Defence Commission of 1920.
