= Velgeren =

Norwegian newspaper

Velgeren ("The Voter") was a Norwegian newspaper, published in Gjøvik in Oppland county.

It started on 2 September 1904 under the name Vælgeren, and was affiliated with the United Norwegian Workers' Association (De forenede norske Arbeidersamfund; in 1911 renamed as Labour Democrats) who had lost their organ Oplændingen. Editor-in-chief was Hans Volckmar from 1904 to 1907, then Ivar Tveit.

From 1920 the newspaper supported both the Labour Democrats and the Liberal Party. The two parties cooperated closely on the political level as well. The newspaper modernized its name to Velgeren in 1925. Ivar Tveit left as editor in 1925, when the newspaper was essentially bankrupt; Aksel Hoel took over as editor from 1925 to 1936. Alf Rønning was editor from 1936 to 1940, Ludvig Thorsen from 1940 to 1942. Both Rønning and Thorsen were fired during the occupation of Norway by Nazi Germany, because they had been hostile to the Nazi occupiers.

From 15 May 1942 to 31 May 1944 the newspaper was published as Oplendingen under close scrutiny from the Norwegian Press Directorate, and with Ola Hjelt as editor.

After the Second World War, Velgeren resurfaced, with Rønning returning as editor and Thorsen as manager. After its last issue on 30 September 1965 it was merged with the Centre Party newspaper Samhold. Alf Rønning was the political editor until 1973. Its name lived on in the constellation Samhold/Velgeren until 1984.
