= Sogn Avis =

Norwegian local newspaper

- Industry: publishing of newspapers
- Headquarters: Sogndal Municipality
- Area served: Leikanger
- Number of employees: 26 (2026)
- Website: sognavis.no

Sogn Avis is a Norwegian newspaper, published in Leikanger in Sogndal Municipality in Vestland county. It was named Sogns Avis from 1926 to 1972 and Sogningen/Sogns Avis from 1972 to 1993.

It started on 21 August 1926 in Vikøyri, a small settlement that had lost the newspaper Sogningen in 1925. Its first editor was Thormod Liljedahl. After less than a year it was bought by bookprinter Ingvald Husabø, who was acting editor in 1927. Then, as new editor Ivar Tveit was hired, and from August 1927 Sogns Avis was the organ for the Norwegian Agrarian Association and the Agrarian Party in the region Sogn.

It was stopped in 1941 during the occupation of Norway by Nazi Germany, but resumed from 3 July 1945. In 1947 it was moved from Vikøyri to Sogndalsfjøra, a regional centre that had lost its newspaper Sogns Tidende. Sogns Avis was put on hold from November 1945 to 21 August 1959, when Ingvald Husabø became personally involved as acting editor again. Husabø moved it to Leikanger.

In 1972 it incorporated Sogningen and continued as Sogningen/Sogns Avis. It was nominally independent of political parties, but between the lines it supported the Conservative Party, a tradition from Sogningen. Editor-in-chief was Hans Arnesen, who multiplied the readership.

In 1993 it incorporated Sogn og Fjordane and continued as Sogn Avis. Editors under the label Sogn Avis have been Gerhard Haugland (1992–2000), Jan Inge Fardal (acting, 2000–2001), Kai Aage Pedersen (2001-2003), Rune Timberlid (2003-2005) and Jan Inge Fardal (2005-present).
