= Oplændingen =

Norwegian newspaper

Oplændingen was a Norwegian newspaper, published in Gjøvik in Oppland county.

It started on 1 July 1893 as the second Conservative Party newspaper in Gjøvik, also covering all of Vest-Oppland. The first, Kristian Amts Blad, had existed for half a year in 1890. However, Oplændingen was sold in 1899, and again in 1900.

The new owner was Karl Kløvstad, who from his first issue on 4 January 1901 severed the ties to the Conservative Party. Oplændingen under Kløvstad's helm pretended to be independent, but from October 1901 Kløvstad involved politicians from the United Norwegian Workers' Association (De forenede norske Arbeidersamfund; in 1911 renamed as Labour Democrats) as owners of the paper. It was published daily from 1903, but did not survive the competition with Gjøviks Blad and Samhold. Oplændingen thus went defunct after its last issue on 23 February 1904. A month later Karl Kløvstad started Oplandet.
