= Sogningen =

Norwegian newspaper

Sogningen was a Norwegian newspaper, published in Vikøyri in Vik Municipality, Sogn og Fjordane county, Norway. The paper was published from 1897 until 1972.

== History and profile ==
Sogningen was established in 1897, and was published in Vikøyri by Rasmus Thorsen as the Conservative Party organ in Sogn. It faced competition from another local newspaper, Sognefjord, from 1912 to 1919, which was started by former (1911 to 1912) Sogningen editor-in-chief Dankert Skagen. Editor-in-chief of Sogningen from 1912 to 1913 wa P. Stensaker, and from 1913 to 1925 Thormod Liljedahl.

When Sogningen was moved to Balestrand in 1925, new editor became Richard Christoffer Schelderup Knoff. He owned the newspaper to 1948, but long before that he had installed his son Richard Knoff, Jr. as editor. It was stopped in 1942 during the occupation of Norway by Nazi Germany, but resumed from 1 August 1945.

In 1951 it was moved back to Vikøyri, and editors were Halvdan Brekke and Thormod Liljedahl (again) before it was moved further to Leikanger. Here, bookprinter Ingvald Husabø had established a small newspaper conglomerate. Sogningen was tightly synchronized with Centre Party newspaper Sogns Avis, and the two newspapers were finally merged in 1972 under the name Sogningen/Sogns Avis (since 1993: Sogn Avis).
