= Sæle, Vestland =

Village in Sogndal Municipality, Norway

Sæle
- Village
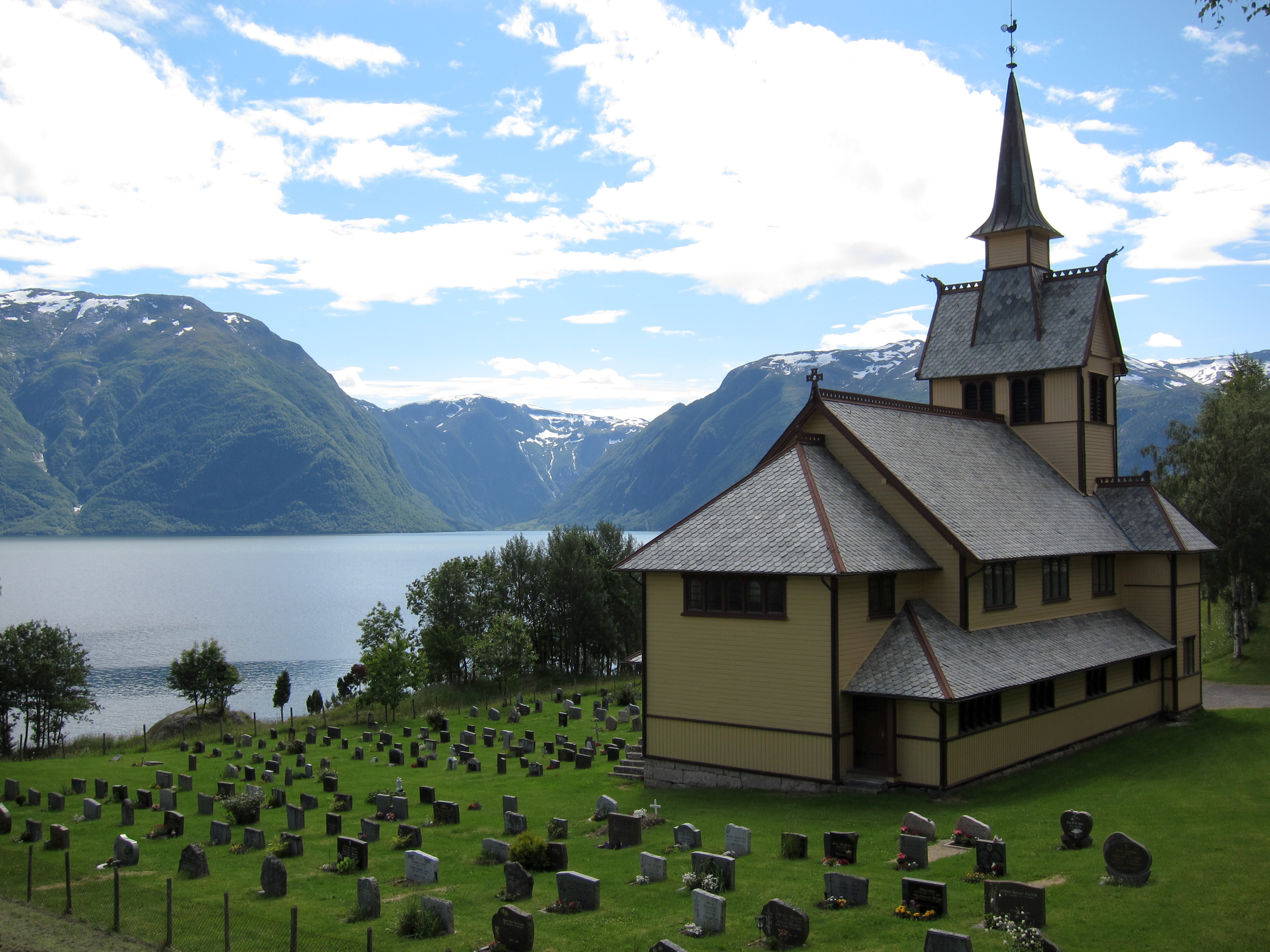
- View of Sæle Church
- Interactive map of Sæle
- Location within Vestland Location within Norway
- Coordinates: 61.11155°N 6.38059°E
- Country: Norway
- Region: Western Norway
- County: Vestland
- District: Sogn
- Municipality: Sogndal Municipality
- Elevation: 35 m (115 ft)
- Time zone: UTC+01:00 (CET)
  - Summer (DST): UTC+02:00 (CEST)
- Post Code: 6899 Balestrand

Sæle is a village in the Sogndal Municipality in Vestland county, Norway. The village is located on the northern shore of the Sognefjorden. The village lies along the Norwegian County Road 55, about 18 kilometres (11 miles) southwest of the village of Balestrand.

Sæle has been the site of the Sæle Church since 1903, when it was moved here from the small, nearby island of Kvamsøy. The church serves the people of southwestern part of the municipality.

The Sæle Sag lumber factory is located on the shoreline of Sæle. The company produces doors, windows, railings and stairs, as well as general-use lumber.

== See also ==
- List of villages in Vestland
