= Canaschal Castle =

Pair of ruined castles in Canton of Graubünden, Switzerland

- Hohentrins Castle
- Trin
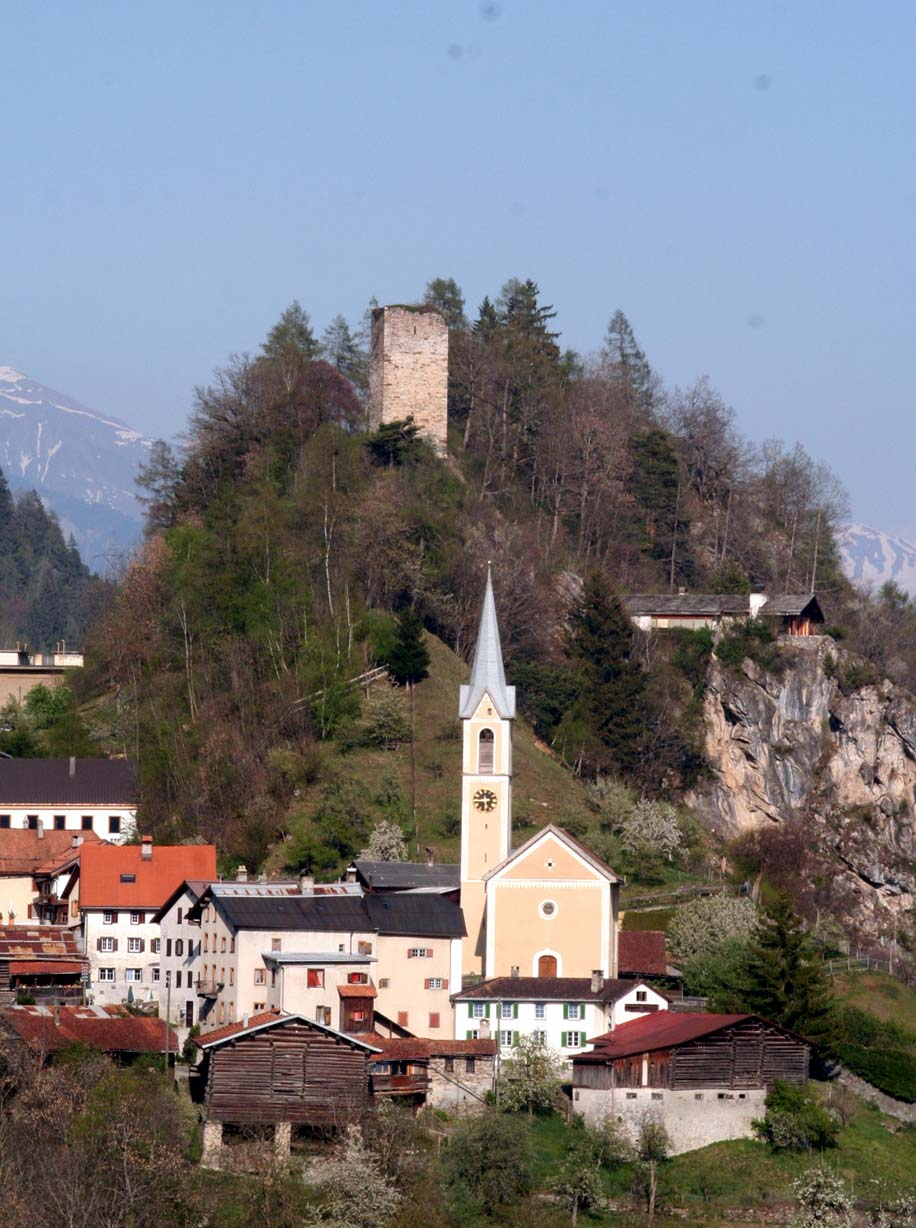
- Ruins of Canaschal above Trin

Site information
- Type: hill castle
- Code: CH-GR
- Condition: ruin

Location
- Coordinates: 46°49′41″N 9°21′56″E
- Height: 876 m above the sea

Site history
- Built: 714 to 718; 12th century
- Materials: Bossage stone

Canaschal Castle (German: Burg Canaschal) is a pair of ruined castles near Trin, Canton of Graubünden, Switzerland.

== Castle name ==
Confusingly the name Canaschal is not consistently used for this castle. It is also referred to individually as Hohentrins Castle or together with Sogn Parcazi also as Hohentrins. Additionally Hohentrin could refer to the region around Trin.

== History ==
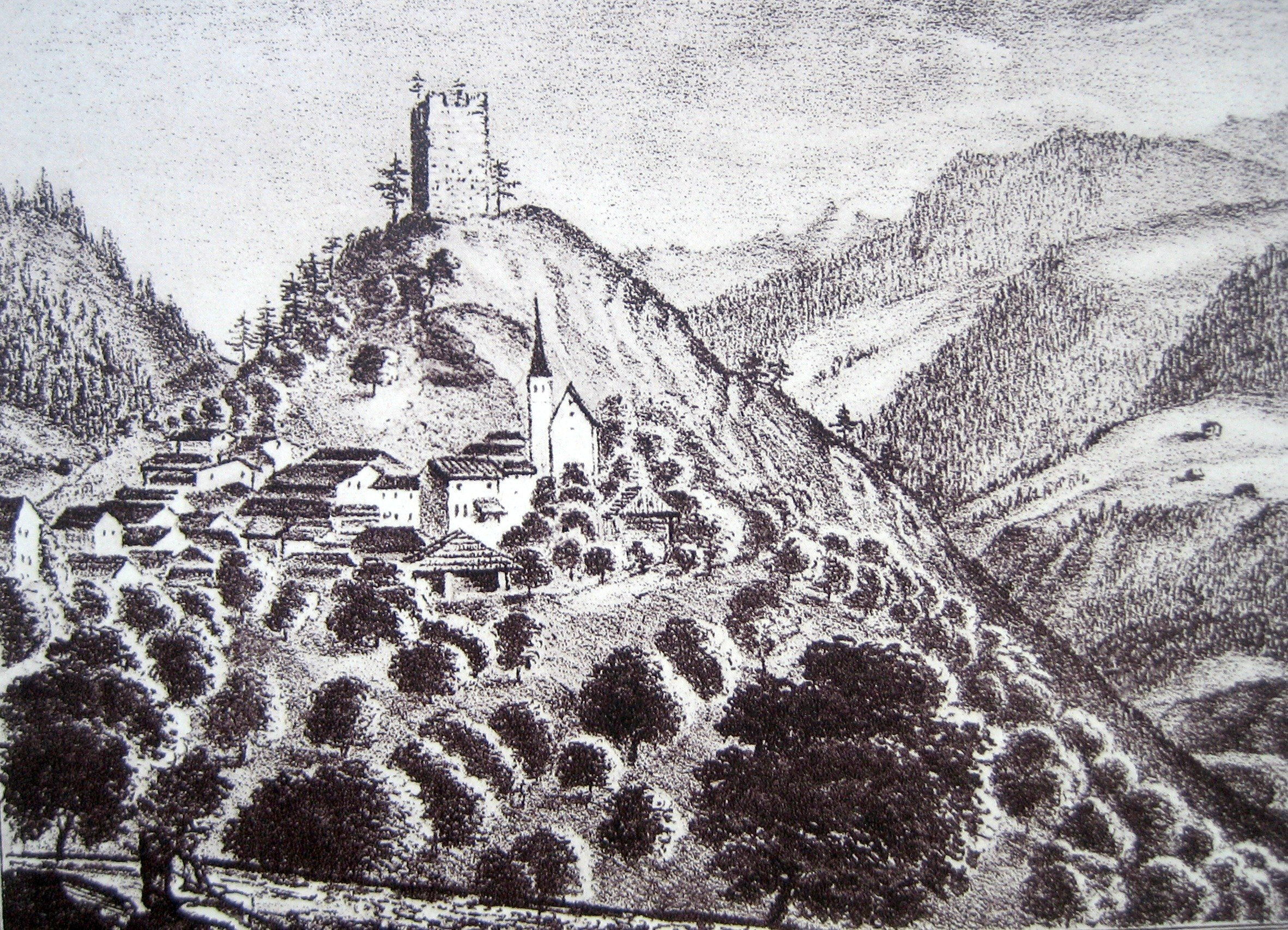
Canaschal Castle in 1830

Very little is known about the history of Canaschal Castle though local tradition holds that Pepin, the father of Charlemagne, was the founder of the castle. It may have been built as part of the defensive complex around Trin or as a refuge castle once the fortified church on Sogn Parcazi (Romansh: St. Pancras' rock) became a feudal castle and could no longer be used as a refuge. The castle may have also been built to guard the road to the Surselva region.

In the 10th century Emperor Otto I combined the imperial estates of Trin, Tamins and Reichenau, Switzerland into the Herrschaft of Hohentrin and granted it to Reichenau Abbey. The Abbey appointed the Freiherr von Frauenberg to oversee the region. After their extinction the Freiherr von Wildenberg was appointed as the Abbey's representative. In the 14th century the Wildenbergs were forced to give the Herrschaft and castle or castles as collateral to the Freiherr von Rhäzüns. They bought the Herrschaft back from Rhäzüns in 1383 but were forced to use it as collateral again in 1399 and then completely sell it in 1425 to the Freiherr von Höwen. After a fire destroyed Sogn Parcazi on 2 July 1470 the vogt may have moved to Canaschal Castle. Vogts continued to live in Trin until at least 1529, though it is unclear whether they lived at Canaschal or elsewhere in the village.

In the 16th century Ulrich Campell's chronicle records that there were two castles in Trin, Hohentrins and Pobiesch which probably referred to Sogn Parcazi and Canaschal respectively.

== Castle site ==
Canaschal Castle consists of two towers separated by about 150 meters (490 ft) on a hill south-east of Trin.

The western tower is about 7.6 m × 8.2 m (25 ft × 27 ft) with walls that are up to 2.2 m (7.2 ft). The tower is about three stories tall and has a high entrance on the south side. One of the corner stones on the south-west corner was supposed to have had the face of a crowned king, representing Pepin the Short, chiseled into it. However the image is heavily weathered and is now invisible. It was probably built in the early 13th century.

The eastern tower stands on the highest point of the hill and is almost completely destroyed. The tower was probably about 10 m × 10 m (33 ft × 33 ft) with walls that were about 1.2 m (3.9 ft) thick. Only the south-east corner is still standing. It was probably built in the 12th century.

== Gallery ==
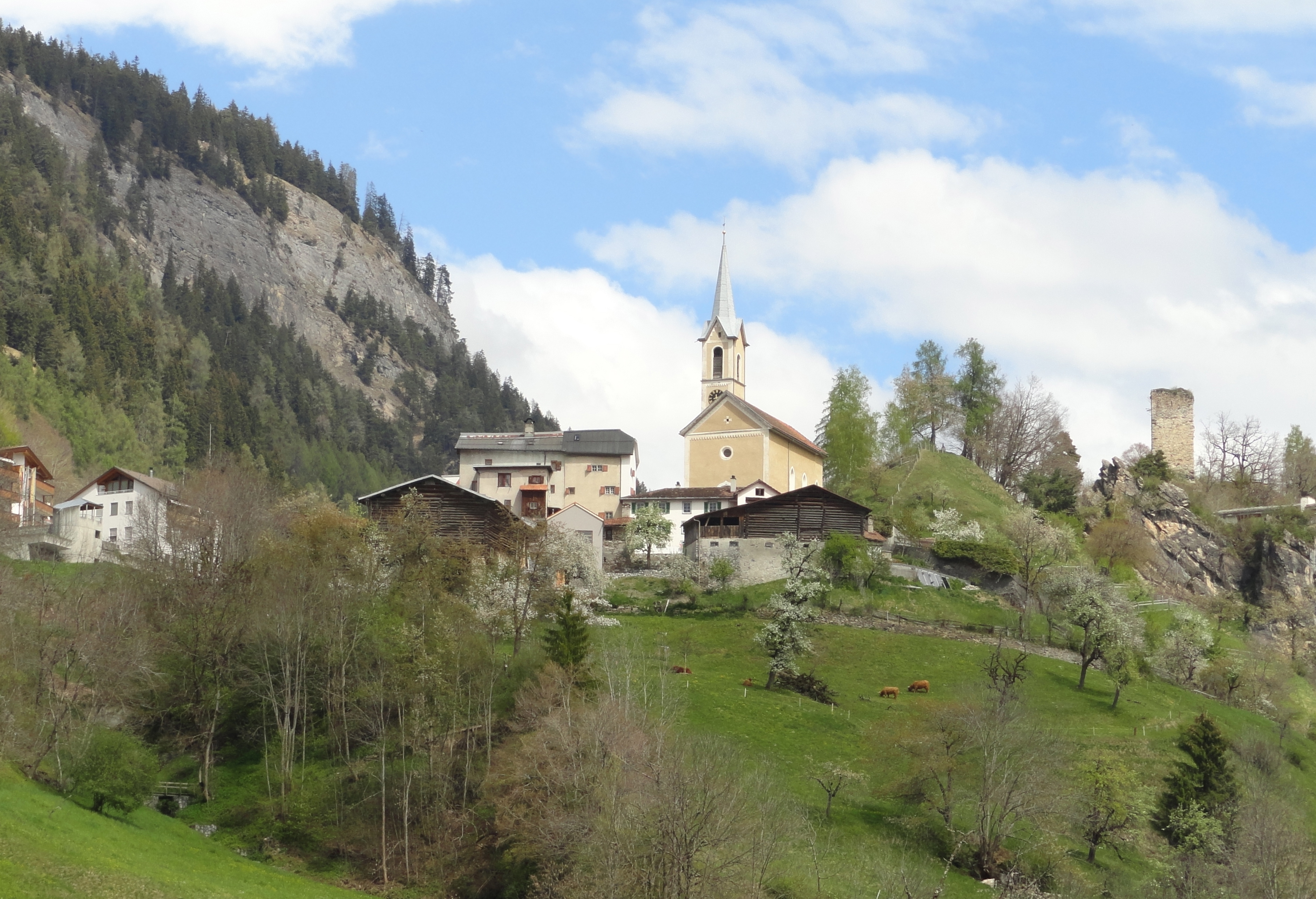
Trin village and Canaschal Castle

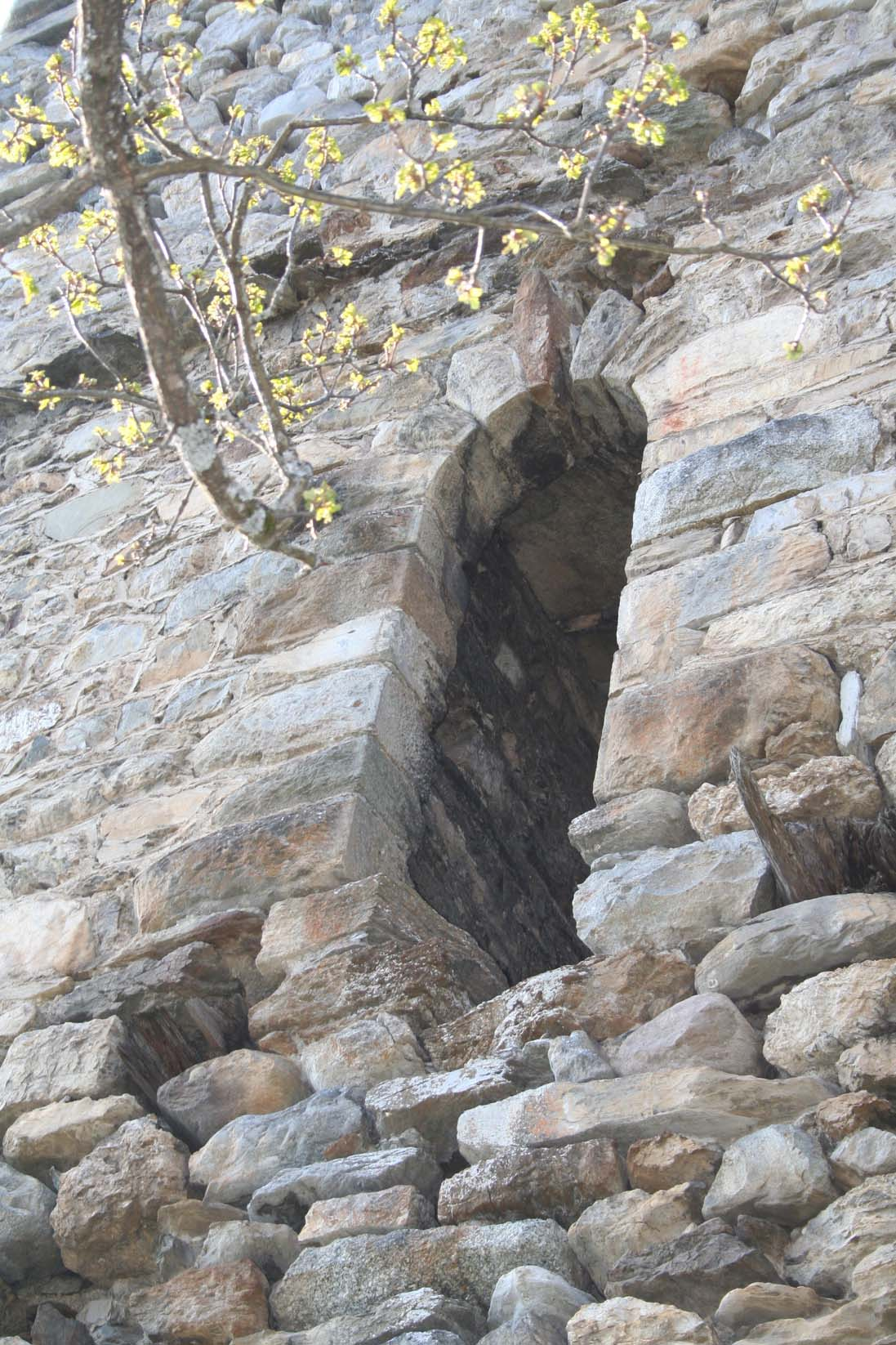
Third story high entrance into the west tower

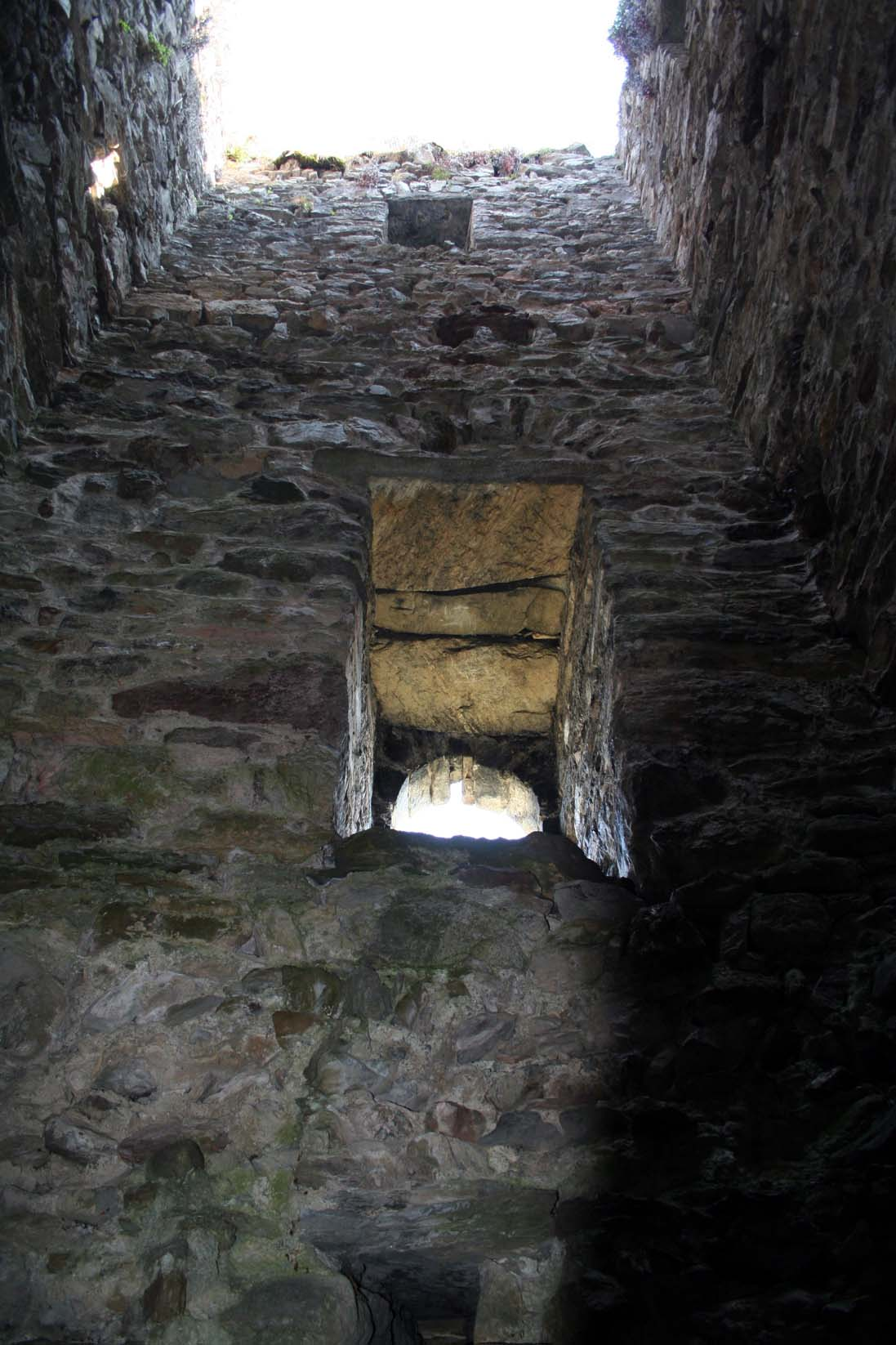
Interior of the west tower

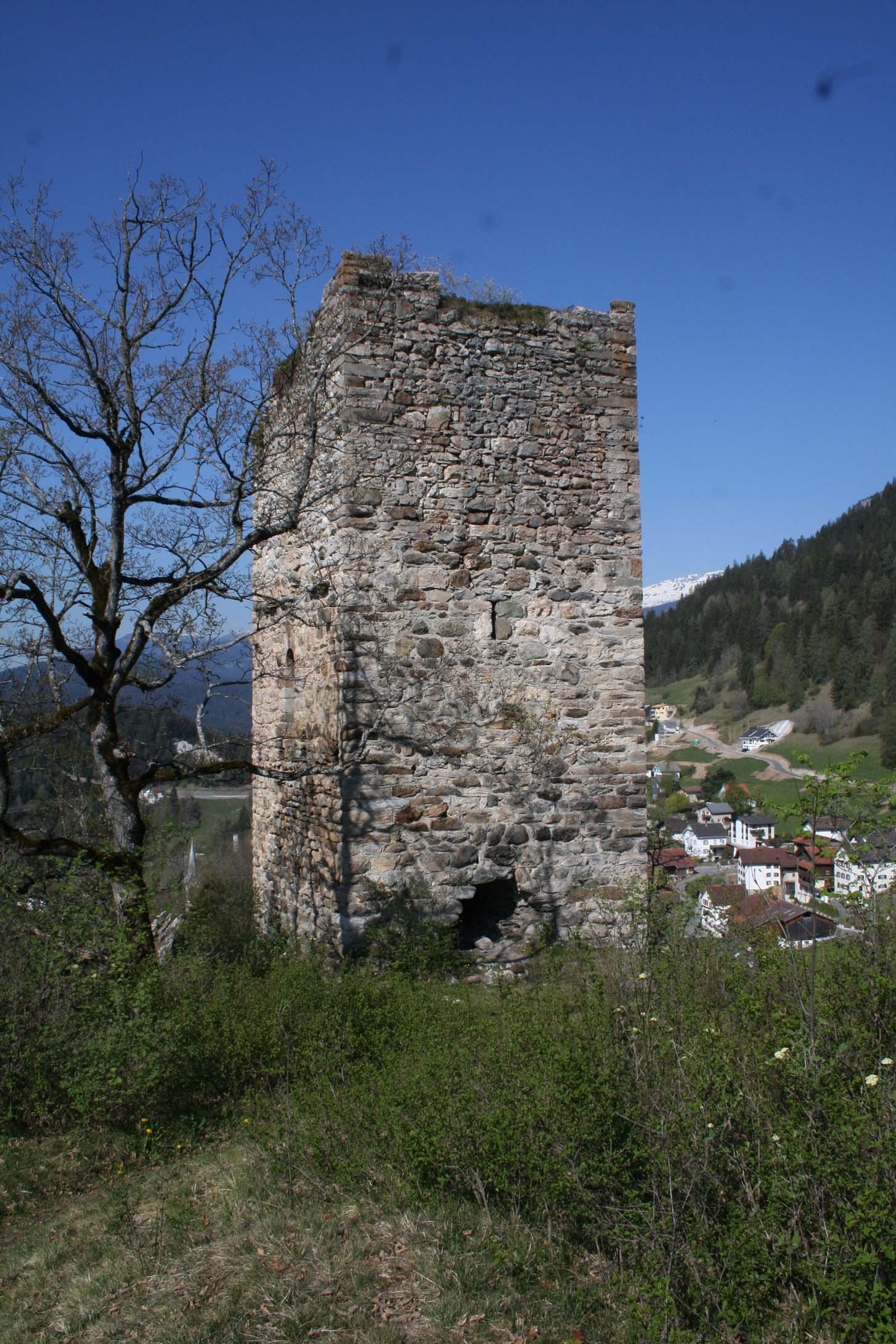
View of the west tower

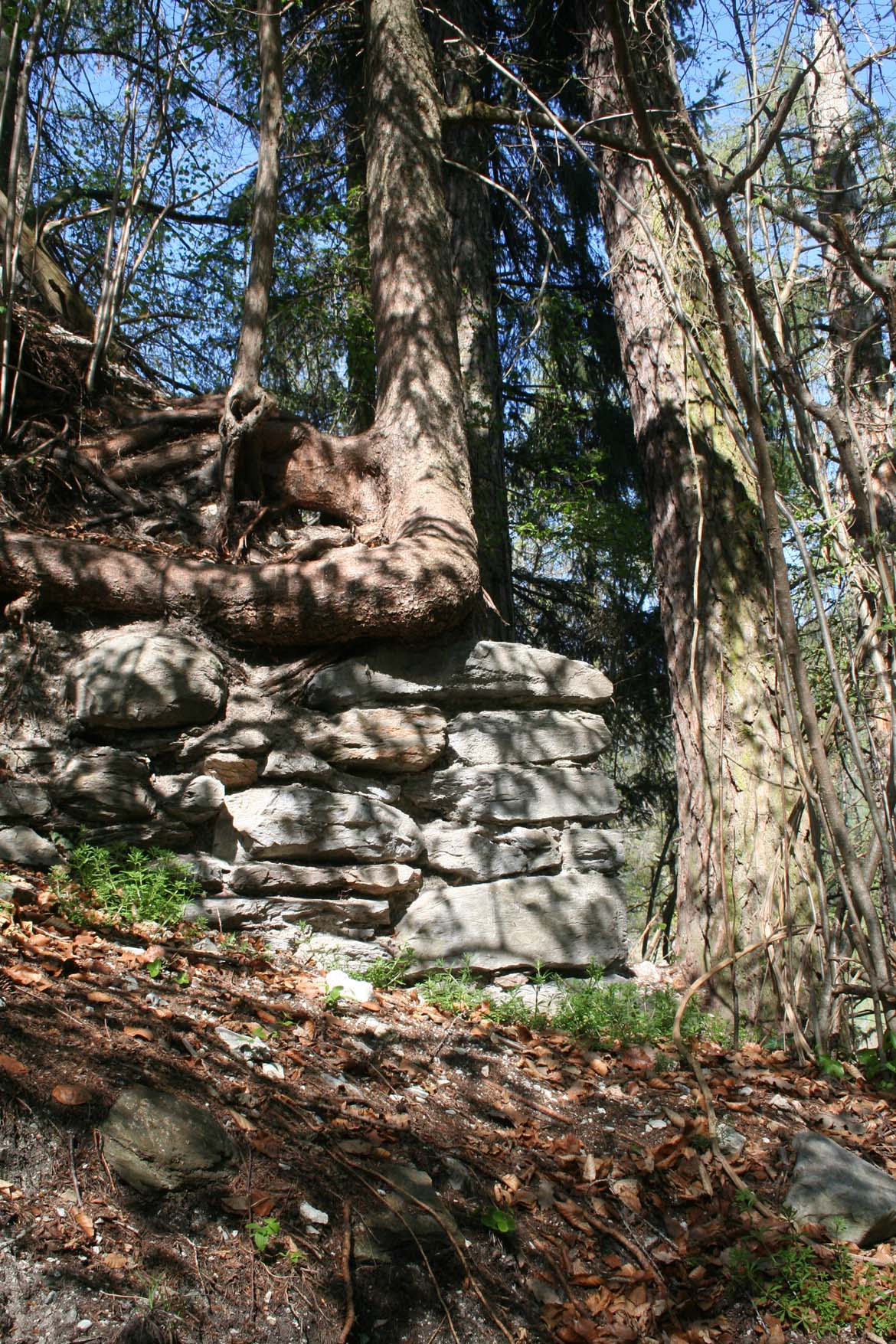
Foundation of the east tower

== See also ==
- List of castles in Switzerland

== Notes ==
1.Local tradition claims King Pepin (c. 714 – 24 September 768), father of Charlemagne as founder of the castle.
