= Sogn og Fjordane (newspaper) =

Norwegian newspaper

Sogn og Fjordane was a Norwegian newspaper, published in Leikanger in Sogn og Fjordane county. It was named Sogn from 1932 to 1936.

It started in Leikanger in 1932 by Ivar Tveit under the name Sogn. After trial issues, the first ordinary issue came on 6 January 1933, and except for a period from August 1933 to May 1934 the newspaper was up and running. From 24 April 1936 the name was Sogn og Fjordane. Ivar Tveit had previously edited Liberal and Agrarian newspapers, but Sogn og Fjordane was a more politically independent venture.

In 1936 Einar Svartefoss was hired as a journalist in 1936, and during the occupation of Norway by Nazi Germany Tveit and Svartefoss shared responsibility. Although both took part in the Norwegian resistance movement, the newspaper survived during the Second World War. In 1947 it incorporated Sogns Tidende.

Einar Svartefoss was the editor-in-chief from 1947 to 1987, when his daughter Sigrid Svartefoss took over. However, the newspaper did not fare well in the competition with Sogn Dagblad and Sogningen/Sogns Avis. On 7 January 1993 it was incorporated into Sogningen/Sogns Avis, which changed its name to Sogn Avis.
