= Oplandet =

Norwegian newspaper

Masthead

Oplandet was a Norwegian newspaper, published in Hamar in Innlandet county. From 1923 to 1928 it was published as Oplandet & Glomdølen.

== History ==
Oplandet was first published in February 1904 by Karl Kløvstad as a successor to the bankrupt newspaper Oplændingen. Oplandet was published in Gjøvik until May, and moved to Hamar from 14 July 1904. Oplændingen had been affiliated with the United Norwegian Workers' Association (De forenede norske Arbeidersamfund; in 1911 renamed as Labour Democrats), but Oplandet supported the Liberal Party.

On 27 March 1923 it changed its name to Oplandet & Glomdølen as it was merged with Labour Democrat newspaper Glomdølen. It was branded as a "new and improved edition" of Glomdølen, and got the same editor-in-chief as the defunct newspaper. Oplandet & Glomdølen itself went defunct after its last issue on 29 December 1928.
