= Samhold =

Norwegian newspaper (1885–1998)

The first issue of Samhold, published 1 January 1885

Samhold was a Norwegian newspaper, published in Gjøvik in Oppland county. From 1920 to 1945 it was named Vestopland, and from 1965 to 1984 Samhold/Velgeren.

It started on 1 January 1885, by Johan Enger who felt that the existing Liberal Party organ Gjøviks Blad was too conservative. It was sold to bookprinter C. F. Hansen in 1912, and then to the Norwegian Agrarian Association in 1920. Enger died in 1925 after a period of illness.

Under ownership of the Agrarian Association, the newspaper was merged with Gjøviks Blad to form Vestopland, signalizing its geographic anchor in the region Vest-Oppland. The allegiance shifted from Liberal to Agrarian, and under editor-in-chief Torstein Lange, formerly with Gjøviks Blad, it became increasingly Nazi-friendly. It was thus allowed to continue publishing during the occupation of Norway by Nazi Germany. After the occupation, which ended together with World War II in 1945, the entire staff save for journalist Erling Espeland were indicted for treason.

Erling Espeland was promoted to editor after the war. The newspaper had been stopped on 8 May 1945, and resumed from 20 June 1945 without the thoroughly compromised name Vestopland. The name Samhold was instead taken back. In October 1965 it incorporated Liberal competitor Velgeren, and had the name Samhold/Velgeren until 1984. The newspaper went bankrupt in 1991, but continued until its final issue on 2 September 1998.
