= Gjøviks Blad =

Norwegian newspaper from Gjøvik, Oppland

Gjøviks Blad was a Norwegian newspaper, published in Gjøvik in Oppland county.

It started on 9 October 1860 under the name Kristian Amtstidende. It was sold in 1877 and renamed to Gjøviks Blad from 1 January 1884. The newspaper supported the Liberal Party, but was found by some liberals to have a too conservative leaning. Johan Enger therefore started a competing liberal newspaper in Gjøvik, Samhold, in 1885.

The owner, bookprinter Fredrik Olsen Lange, was succeeded by his son Torstein Lange in 1914. On 24 December 1920 the newspaper came with its last issue, before being merged with Samhold under the new name Vestopland (from 3 January 1921). Lange remained editor until 1945.
