= Sæle Church =

Church in Vestland, Norway

- Sæle kyrkje
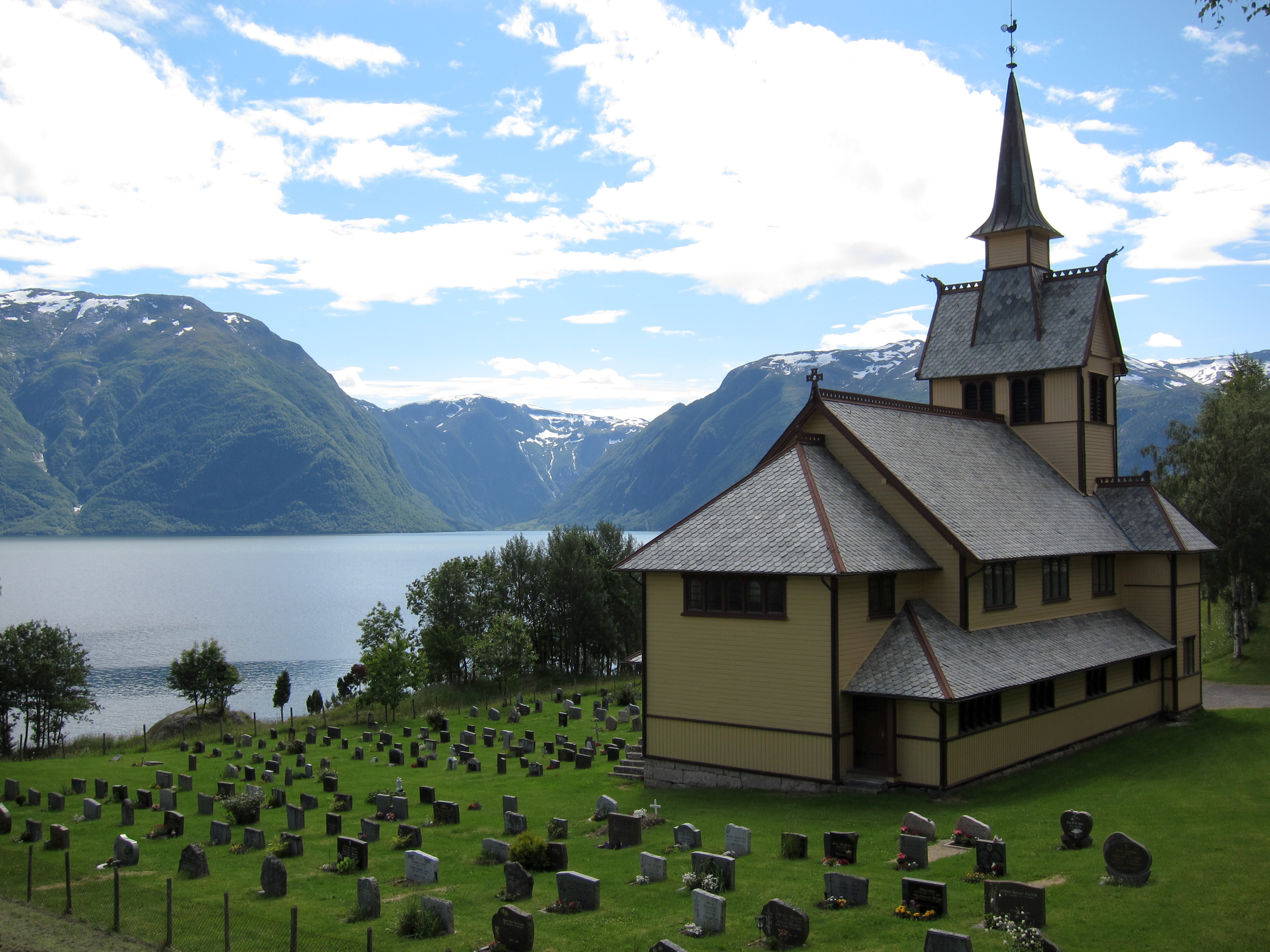
- View of the church
- Sæle Church
- 61°06′44″N 6°23′21″E
- Location: Sogndal Municipality, Vestland
- Country: Norway
- Denomination: Church of Norway
- Churchmanship: Evangelical Lutheran

History
- Status: Parish church
- Founded: 1903
- Consecrated: 28 April 1903

Architecture
- Functional status: Active
- Architect: Hans Jacob Sparre
- Architectural type: Long church
- Style: Romanesque revival
- Completed: 1903 (123 years ago)

Specifications
- Capacity: 170
- Materials: Wood

Administration
- Diocese: Bjørgvin bispedømme
- Deanery: Sogn prosti
- Parish: Balestrand
- Norwegian Cultural Heritage Site
- Type: Church
- Status: Listed
- ID: 85031

Sæle Church (Norwegian: Sæle kyrkje) is a parish church of the Church of Norway in Sogndal Municipality in Vestland county, Norway. It is located in the village of Sæle, on the northern shore of the Sognefjorden. It is one of two churches for the Balestrand parish which is part of the Sogn prosti (deanery) in the Diocese of Bjørgvin. The yellow, wooden church was built in a long church design with a Romanesque revival style in 1903 using plans drawn up by the architect Hans Jacob Sparre from Oslo. The church seats about 170 people.

== History ==
Sæle Church was built to replace the centuries-old stone Kvamsøy Church on the nearby island of Kvamsøy. This decision was not made lightly, but after much discussion, debate, and strife among the local population in the parish. The new church was designed by Hans Jacob Sparre and built by builder Anders Korsvold. The nave of the new church measured about 12.5 by 11.4 metres (41 ft × 37 ft) and the choir measured about 4.7 by 6 metres (15 ft × 20 ft). The church porch on the west end of the building measured about 3.1 by 5.9 metres (10 ft × 19 ft). The church was consecrated on 28 April 1903 by the Bishop Johan Willoch Erichsen. In 1954, electric heating was installed in the church. Sæle Church (and Kvamsøy Church before that) had historically belonged to the parish of Vik Municipality, but in 1964, it was transferred to the parish of Balestrand Municipality. In 1998, a bathroom was constructed as an extension to the existing church porch.

== Media gallery ==
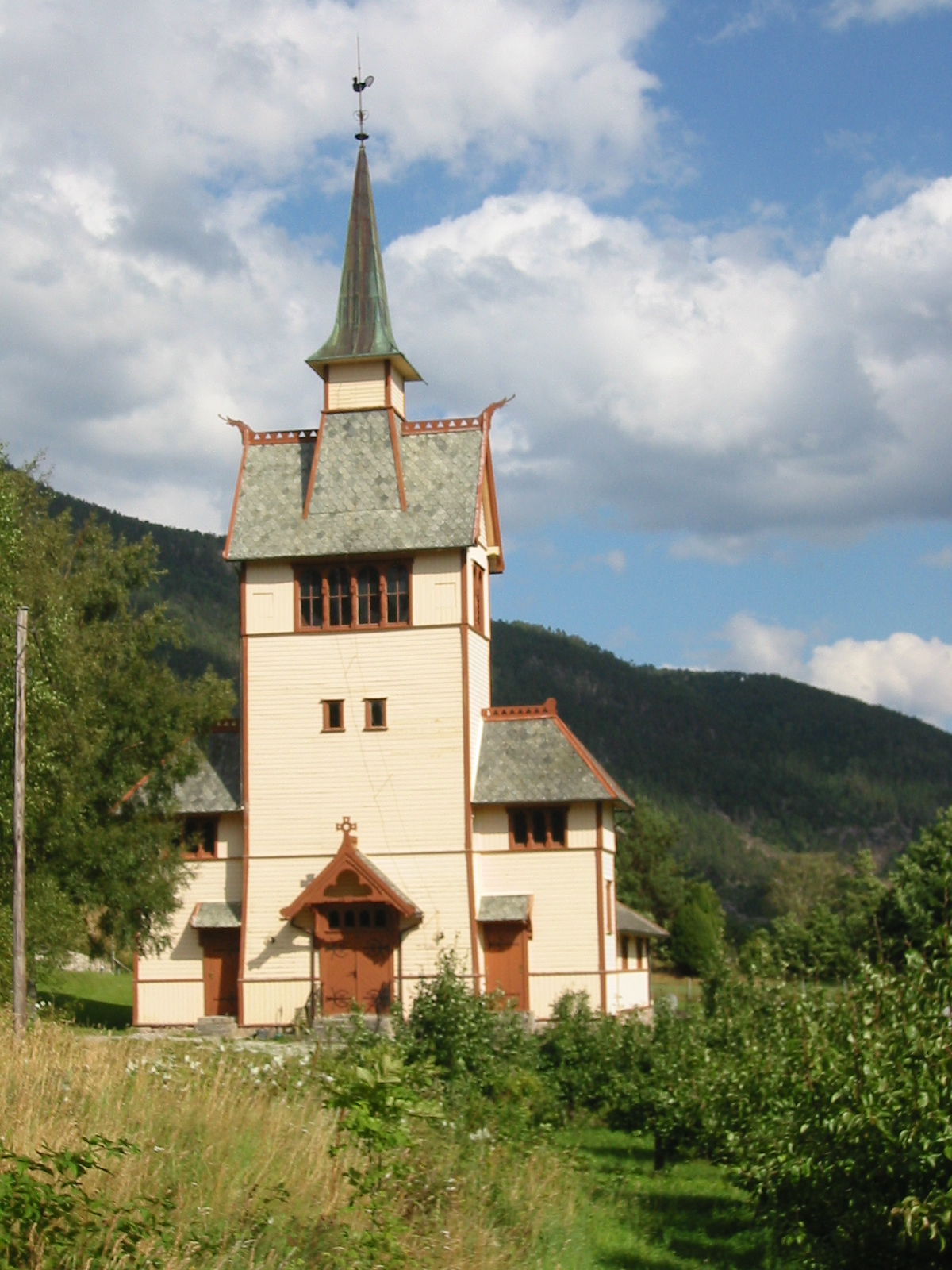
Front of the church

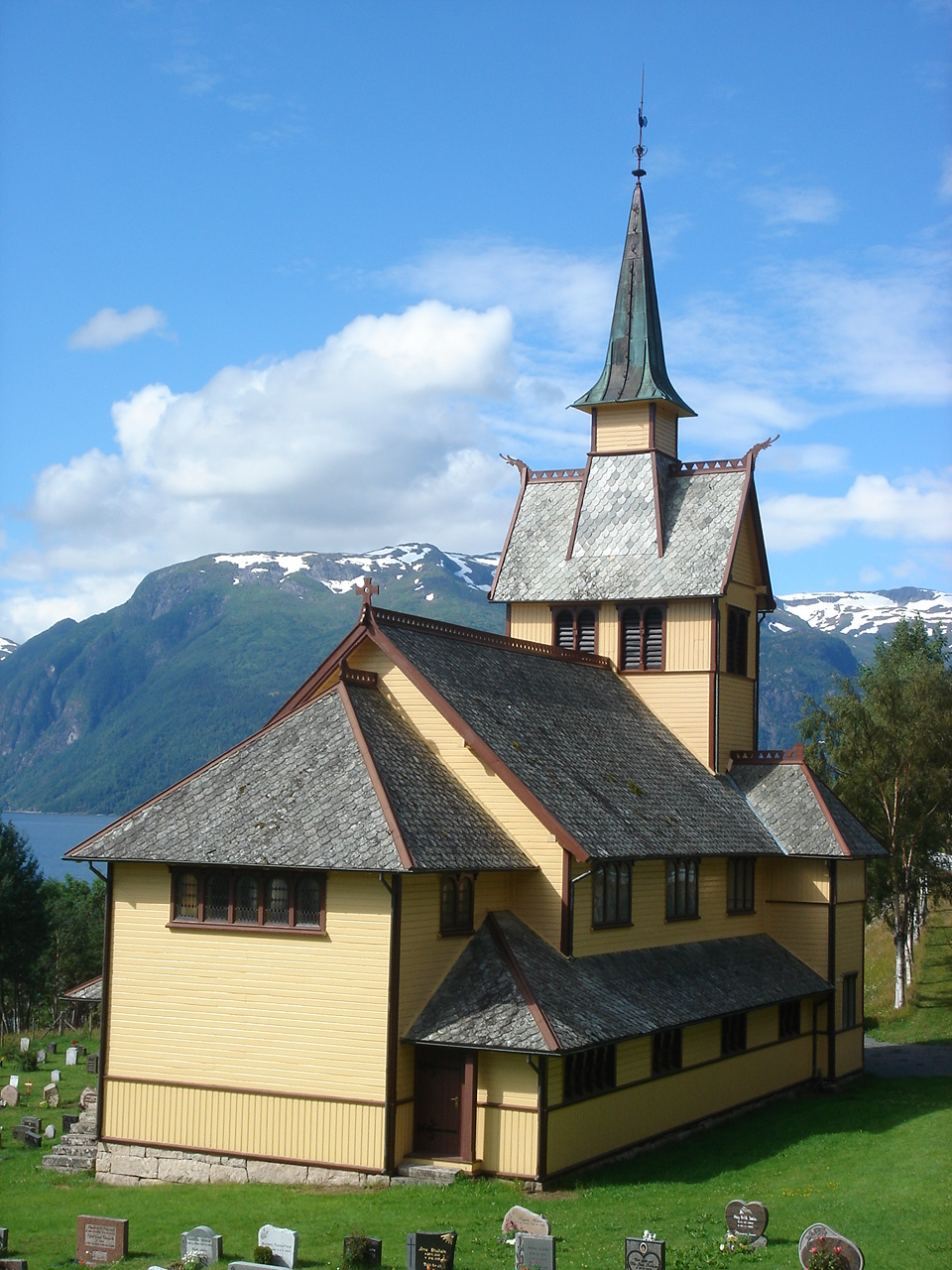
Back side of the church

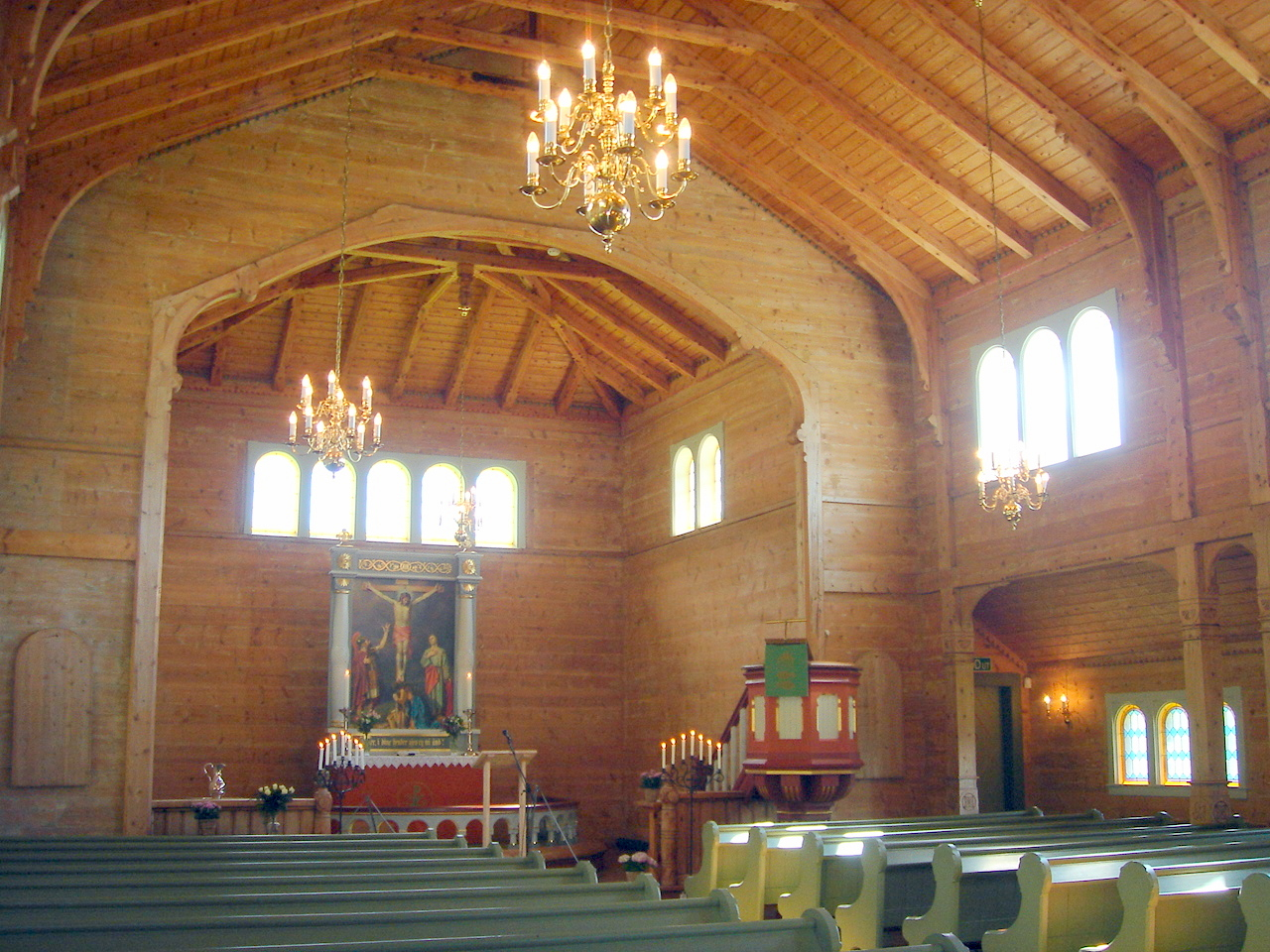
Interior of the church

== See also ==
- List of churches in Bjørgvin
