= Kvamsøy Church =

Church in Vestland, Norway

- Kvamsøy kyrkje
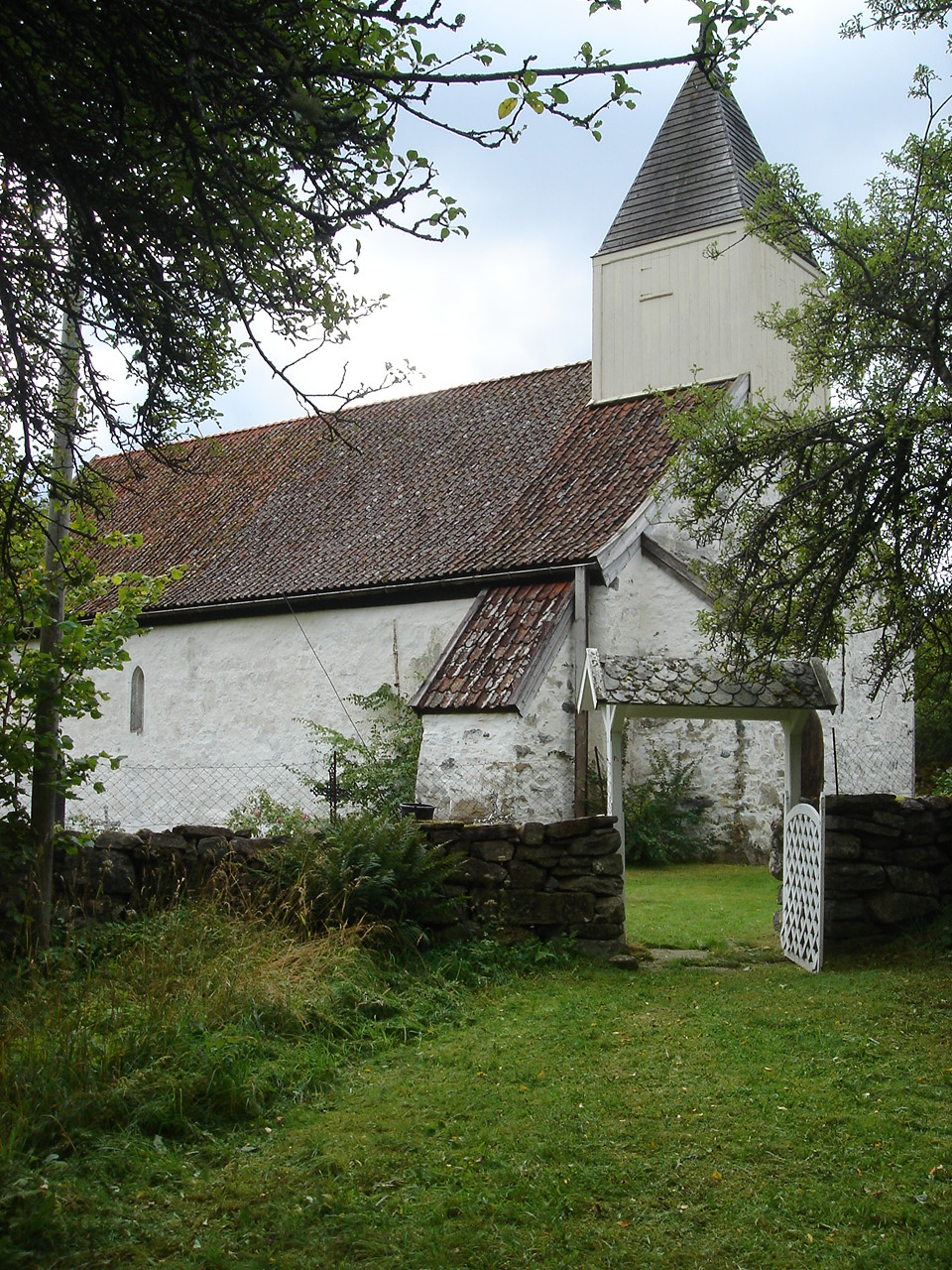
- View of the church
- Kvamsøy Church
- 61°07′43″N 6°29′04″E
- Location: Sogndal Municipality, Vestland
- Country: Norway
- Denomination: Church of Norway
- Previous denomination: Catholic Church
- Churchmanship: Evangelical Lutheran

History
- Status: Parish church (former)
- Founded: c. 1280-1300
- Consecrated: c. 1280-1300

Architecture
- Functional status: Preserved museum
- Architectural type: Basilica
- Completed: c. 1280 (746 years ago)
- Closed: 1903

Specifications
- Capacity: 210
- Materials: Stone

Administration
- Diocese: Bjørgvin bispedømme
- Deanery: Sogn prosti
- Parish: Balestrand
- Norwegian Cultural Heritage Site
- Type: Church
- Status: Automatically protected
- ID: 84858

Kvamsøy Church (Norwegian: Kvamsøy kyrkje) is a historic parish church of the Church of Norway in Sogndal Municipality in Vestland county, Norway. It is located on the small island of Kvamsøy. It was the church for the old Kvamsøy parish which is now part of the Sogn prosti (deanery) in the Diocese of Bjørgvin. The white, stone church was built in a basilica design between the years 1280 and 1300. The church seats about 210 people.

== History ==
The earliest existing historical records of the church date back to the year 1330, but it was not new that year. The stone long church was likely built between 1280 and 1300 by an unknown architect. The church sat on the small island of Kvamsøy which lies about 50 metres (160 ft) off the mainland shore. The main body of the church measures 17.8 by 7.9 metres (58 ft × 26 ft). The stone walls generally measure about 134 centimetres (53 in) thick. The current tower on the church was built around the year 1715.

This was the church for the parish of Kvamsøy until it was replaced in 1903 by the newly built Sæle Church on the mainland. Since the new church was built, Kvamsøy Church was taken out of regular use and it is used mostly as a museum. The parish continues to use the church for special events and it holds two services there each year: one in May and one on Olsok. Other special services such as funerals and weddings can be held there when requested. There is no electric heating in the church, so it is not used at all from October until May. The church is a protected historical site.

== Media gallery ==
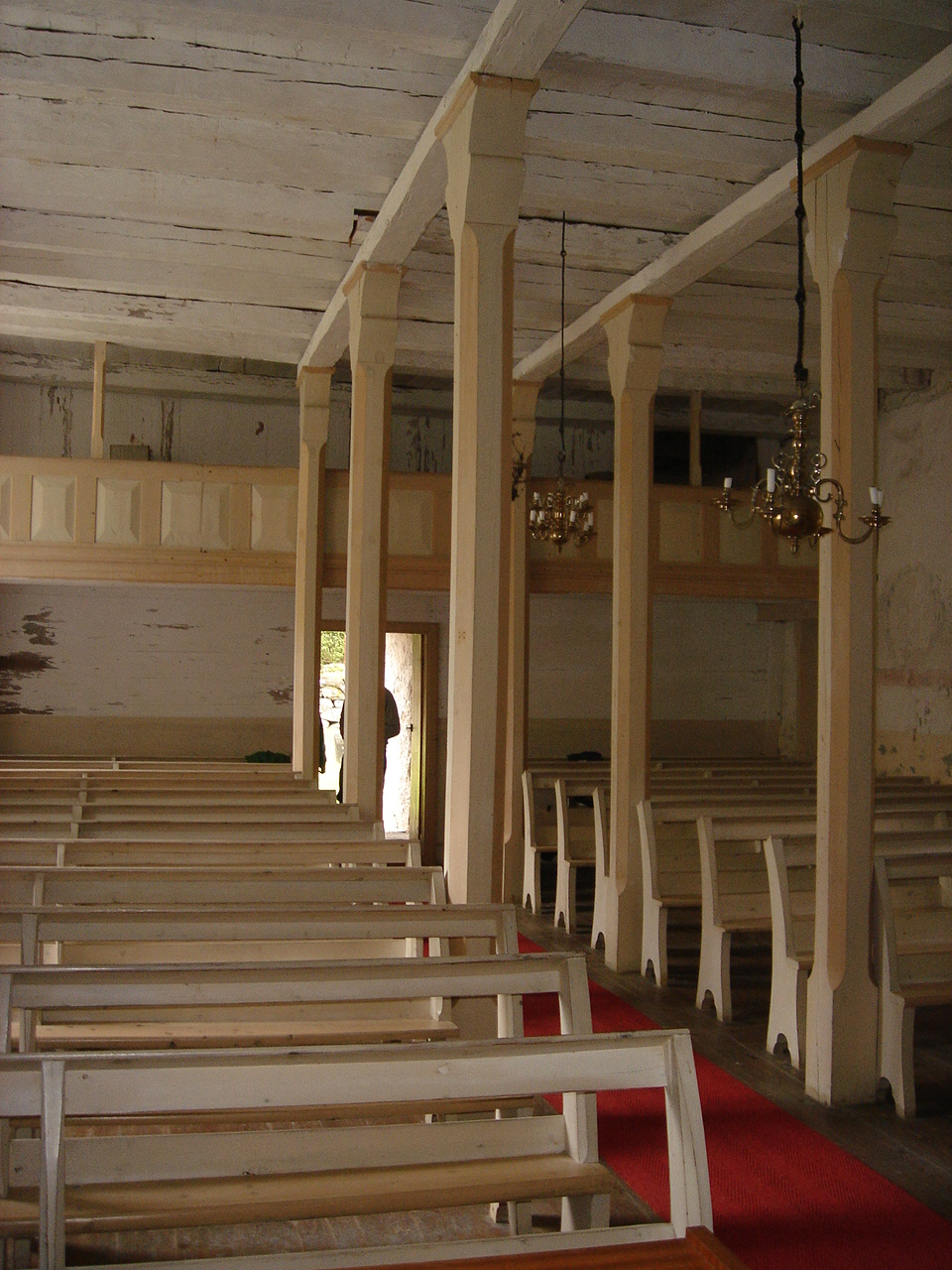
Interior view

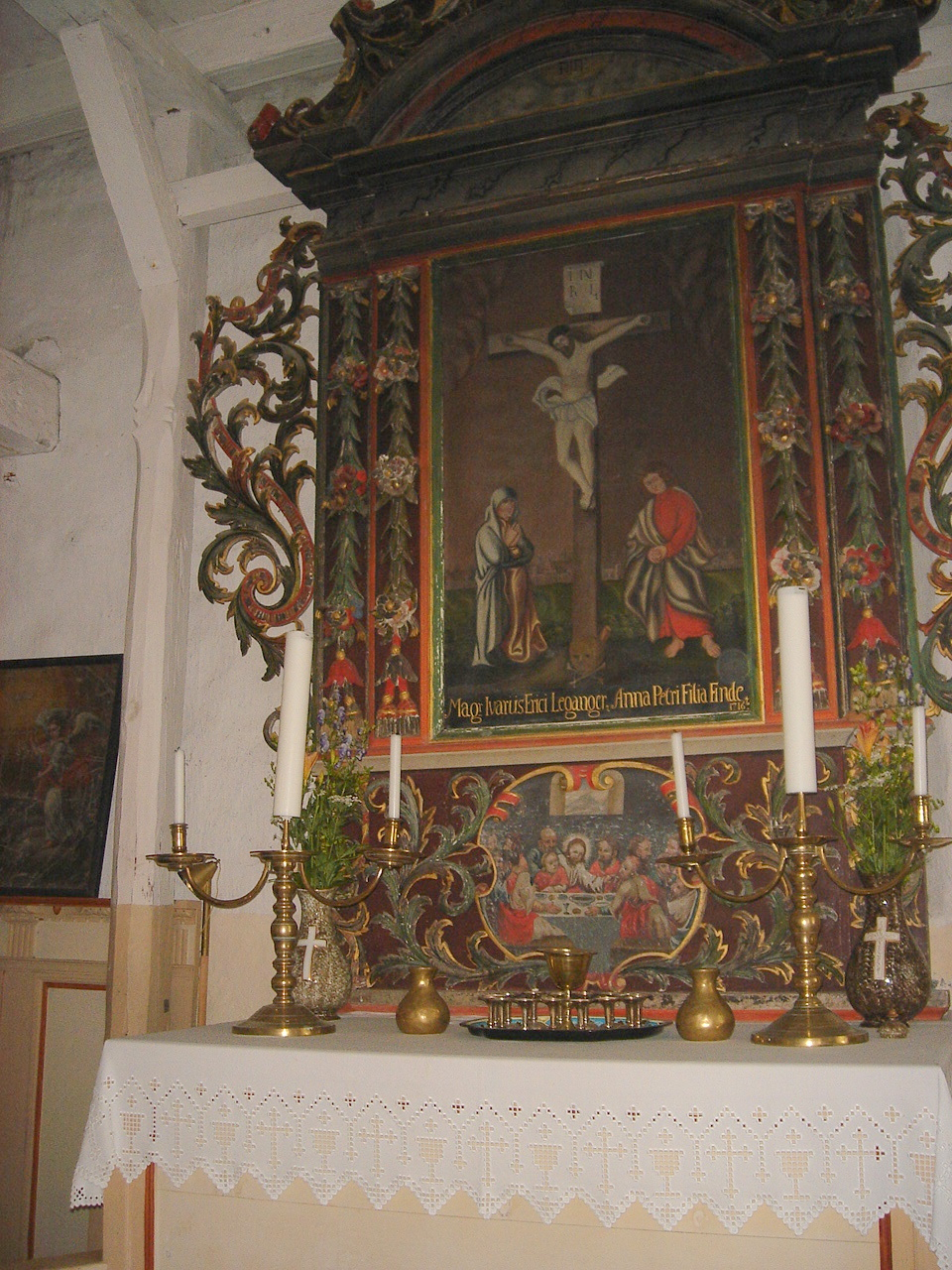
View of the altar

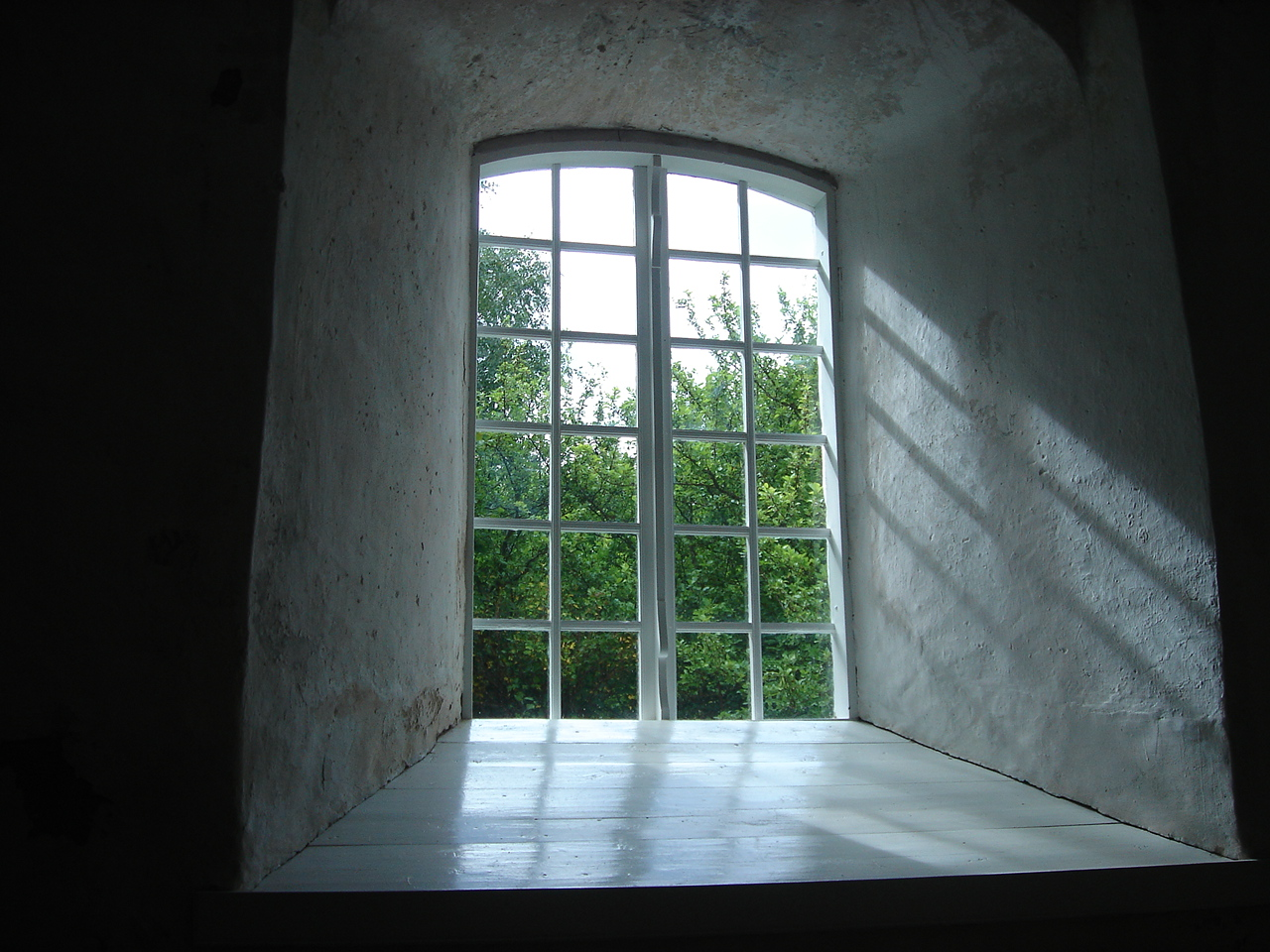
View of a window (and the 1.34-metre (4 ft 5 in) thick walls)

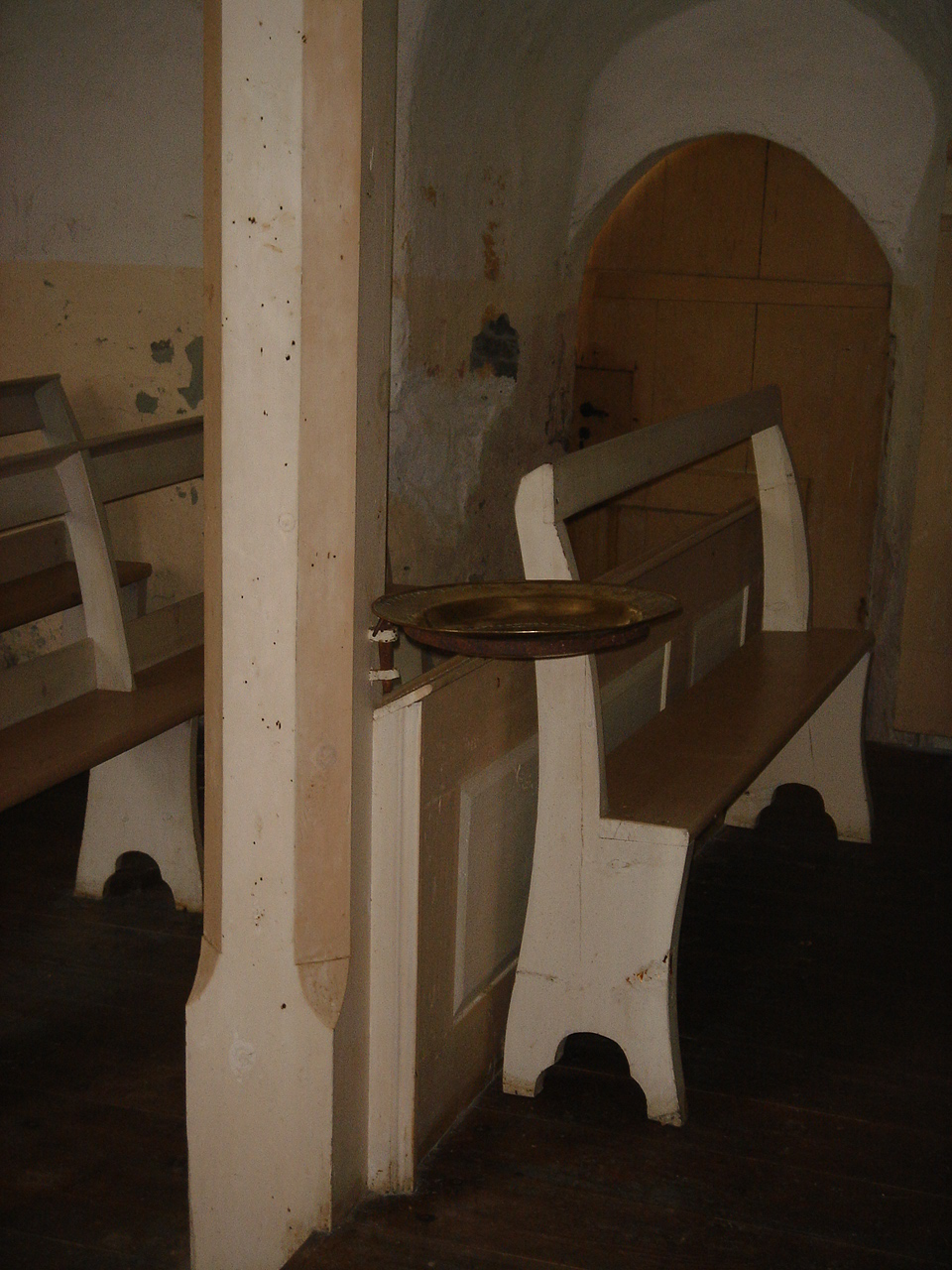
The church seats

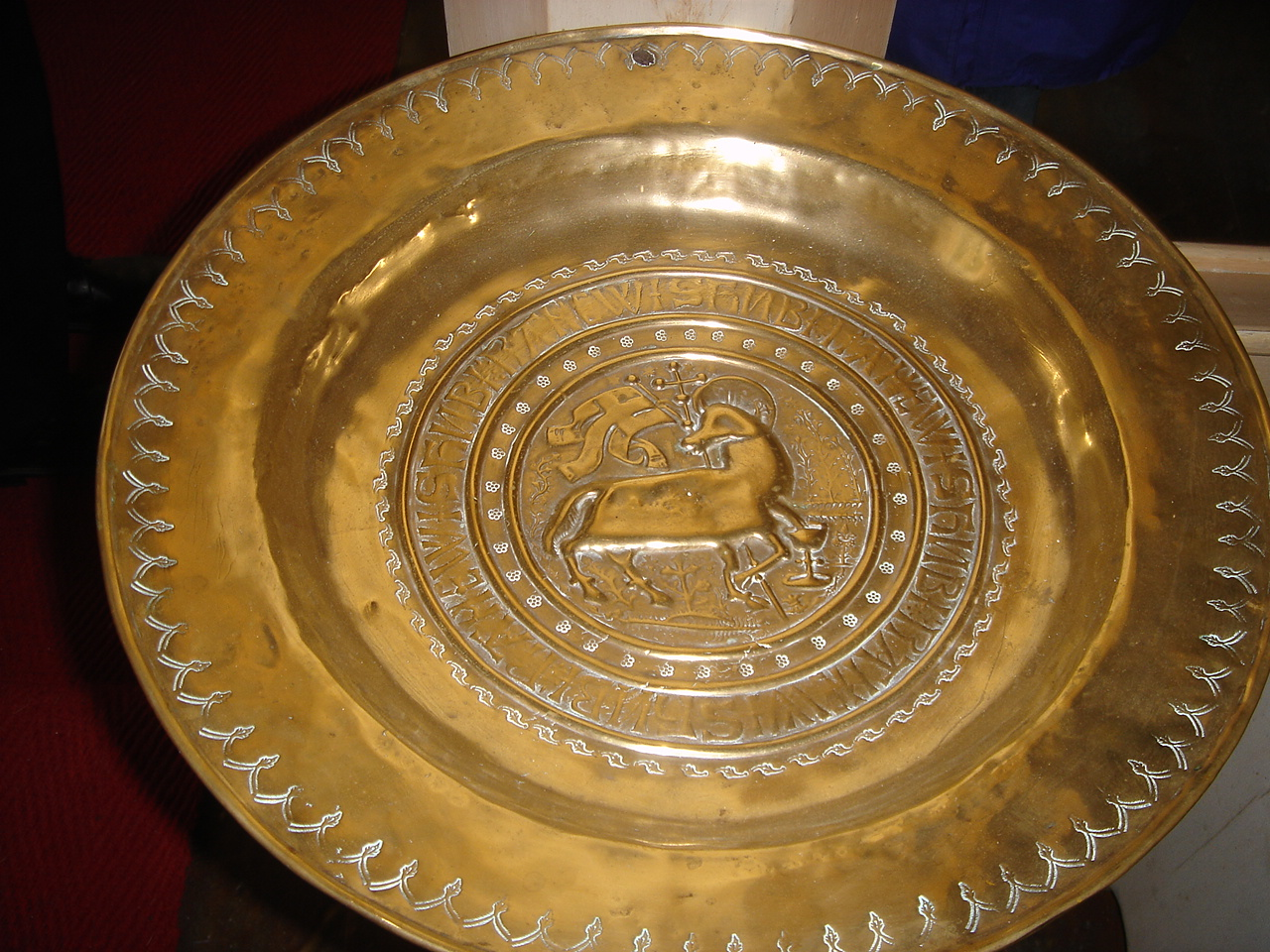
Baptismal bowl

== See also ==
- List of churches in Bjørgvin
