= Sogn Parcazi Castle and Church =

Ruined castle and fortified church in Switzerland

Sogn Parcazi
- Burg Hohentrins; Crap Sogn Parcazi; Sogn Barcazi
- Trin
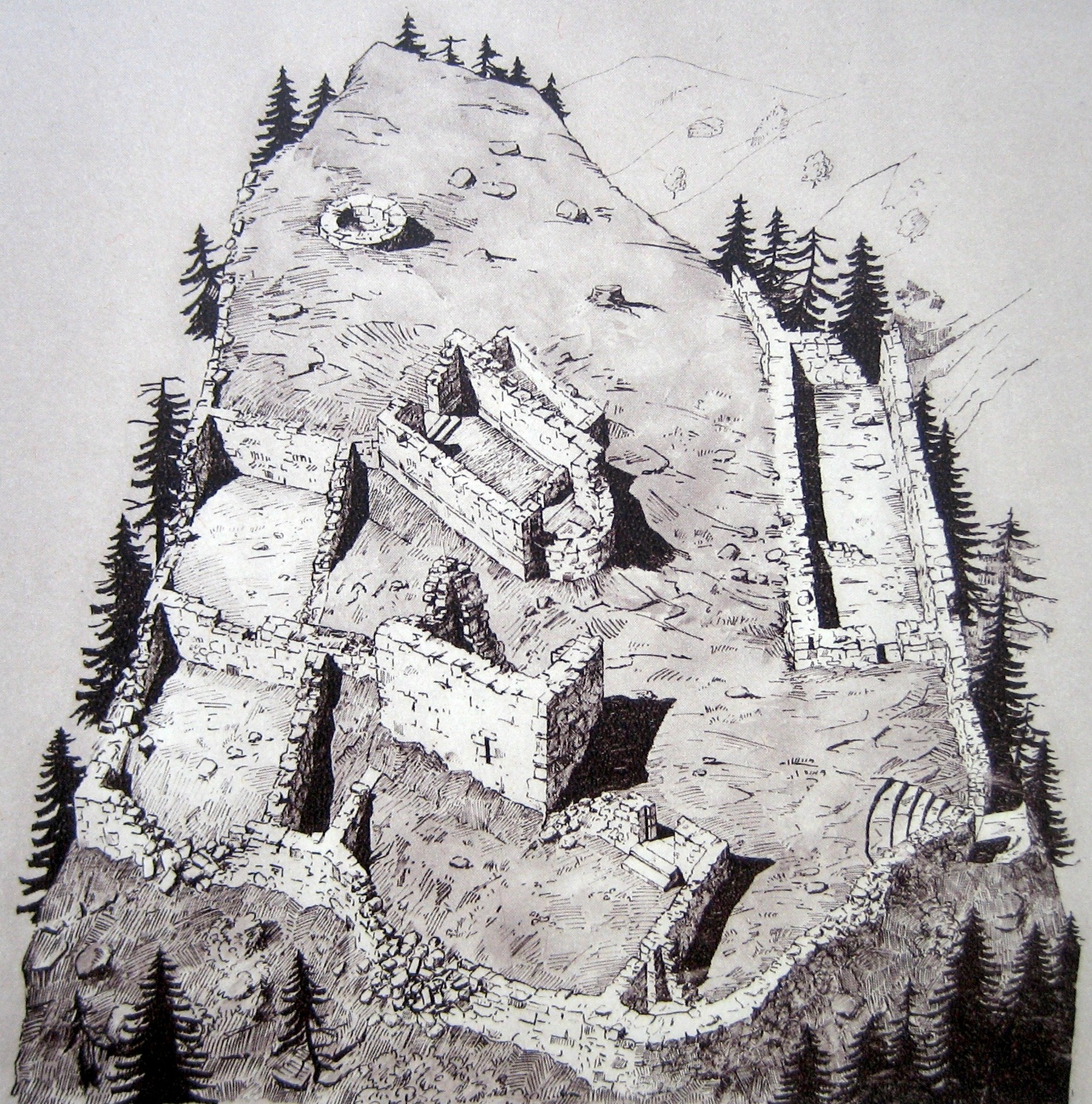
- Sogn Parcazi Castle and Church

Site information
- Type: hill castle
- Code: CH-GR
- Condition: ruin

Location
- Location within Canton of Graubünden Location within Switzerland
- Coordinates: 46°49′45.628″N 09°21′2.444″E
- Height: 1,005 m above the sea

Site history
- Built: about 750 (?)
- Materials: Rubble stone

Sogn Parcazi Castle and Church (Romansh: Crap Sogn Parcazi, also Hohentrins) is a ruined castle and fortified church in the municipality of Trin of the Canton of Graubünden in Switzerland. It is a Swiss heritage site of national significance.

== Castle name ==
The castle is known as Crap Sogn Parcazi (Romansh: The Rock of St. Pancras) after the hill that it stands on. It is also referred to individually as Hohentrins Castle or together with Canaschal Castle also as Hohentrins. Additionally Hohentrin could refer to the region around Trin.

== History ==
The early chronicles of the region list Pepin, the father of Charlemagne, as the founder of the castle. While this is unlikely, it has not been conclusively disproven. Regardless of whether it is true, the first church on the site may date to the 8th century and may have been built on an even older pre-Christian cult site. It was originally built as a fortified church and refuge castle and may have been the first parish church of Tamins and Trin. In the 9th or 10th century the Emperor combined the imperial estates of Trin, Tamins and Reichenau, Switzerland into the Herrschaft of Hohentrin and granted it to Reichenau Abbey. Over the following centuries the complex was expanded and gradually converted into a feudal castle. The first residential building on the site was built in the 11th or 12th century when a tower was added. The palas on the northern end was probably built around 1300.

The castle first appears in historical records in the early 14th century. In 1314 the Herrschaft of Hohentrins passed from Reichenau Abbey to the Freiherr von Frauenberg. By 1325 it was owned by Count Hugo III von Werdenberg-Heiligenberg. In 1360 there was a fight between the local minor nobility and the Werdenberg-Heiligenberg and Werdenberg-Sargans families, but nothing is recorded as happening to Sogn Parcazi. At some point in the next two decades the castle was given as collateral to Ulrich Brun von Rhäzüns, because in 1383 Hugo and Heinrich von Werdenberg-Heiligenberg had to repay Ulrich Brun. In 1398 they pawned the castle again, this time to Albrecht von Werdenberg-Bludenz who was a supporter of the Habsburgs. However, a few months later Rudolf and Heinrich von Werdenberg-Heiligenberg as the owners of the castle joined the anti-Habsburg Grey League.

In 1428 the last male member of the Werdenberg-Heiligenberg family, Hugo, died and the castle and herrschaft passed to Peter von Hewen. The von Hewen family appointed vogts to administer the castle and lands for them. The last vogt at Sogn Parcazi was the Vogt Otto Capol. On 2 July 1470 he and his wife traveled to Reichnau for a celebration. While they were gone a fire broke out in the castle, destroying it and killing three of the vogt's children and their maid. One theory is that the fire was set by debtors who owed the vogt money in order to destroy the documents recording their loans. The castle was never rebuilt and Vogt Capol received a title in Lugnez. Later records continue to record that there were vogts over Hohentrins until 1524, but it is unknown whether they lived at Canaschal Castle or in the village. The herrschaft went to Johann von Planta in 1568, followed by Wolfgang von Löwenstein-Wertheim in 1583 and the Lords of Schauenstein in 1585. In 1616 the municipality of Trin bought their freedom from the Schauenstein family.

The castle was partly excavated in 1931 but the conservation project ran out of money and some of the excavated walls collapsed. During World War II the Swiss Army took over Sogn Parcazi and built two bunkers on the hill. After the war, the army remained responsible for the ruins and in 1964 they were re-excavated, repaired and reinforced. The ruins were turned over to the municipality in 2004 and from 2006 until 2010 they were again repaired and an archeological excavation revealed much of the castle's history.

== Castle site ==
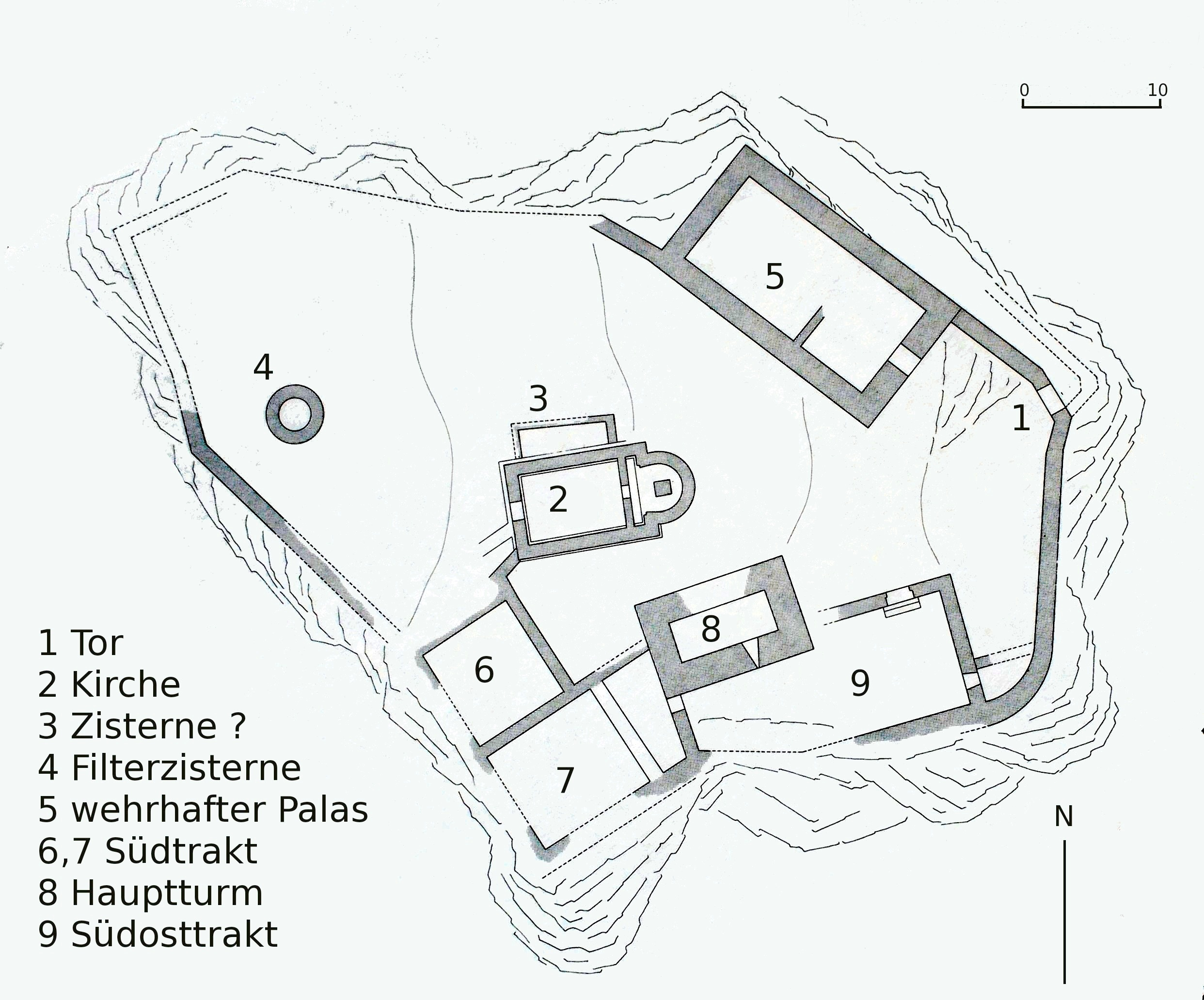
Plan of the castle

The ruins of the castle are located on a steep hill west of Trin village. The ruins of the Church of St. Pancras are located in the center of the 50 by 80 meters (160 ft × 260 ft) flat top of the hill. The simple church building is oriented along an approximate east-west axis. It dates from about 1100 and may have replaced an earlier church. A rectangular cistern or baptistery was added in the 12th century. The 11th- or 12th-century tower south of the tower is 11 m × 7 m (36 ft × 23 ft) with walls that are up to 1.8 m (5.9 ft) thick. The palas to the north was added in the 13th century and is 18 m (59 ft) long.

== Gallery ==
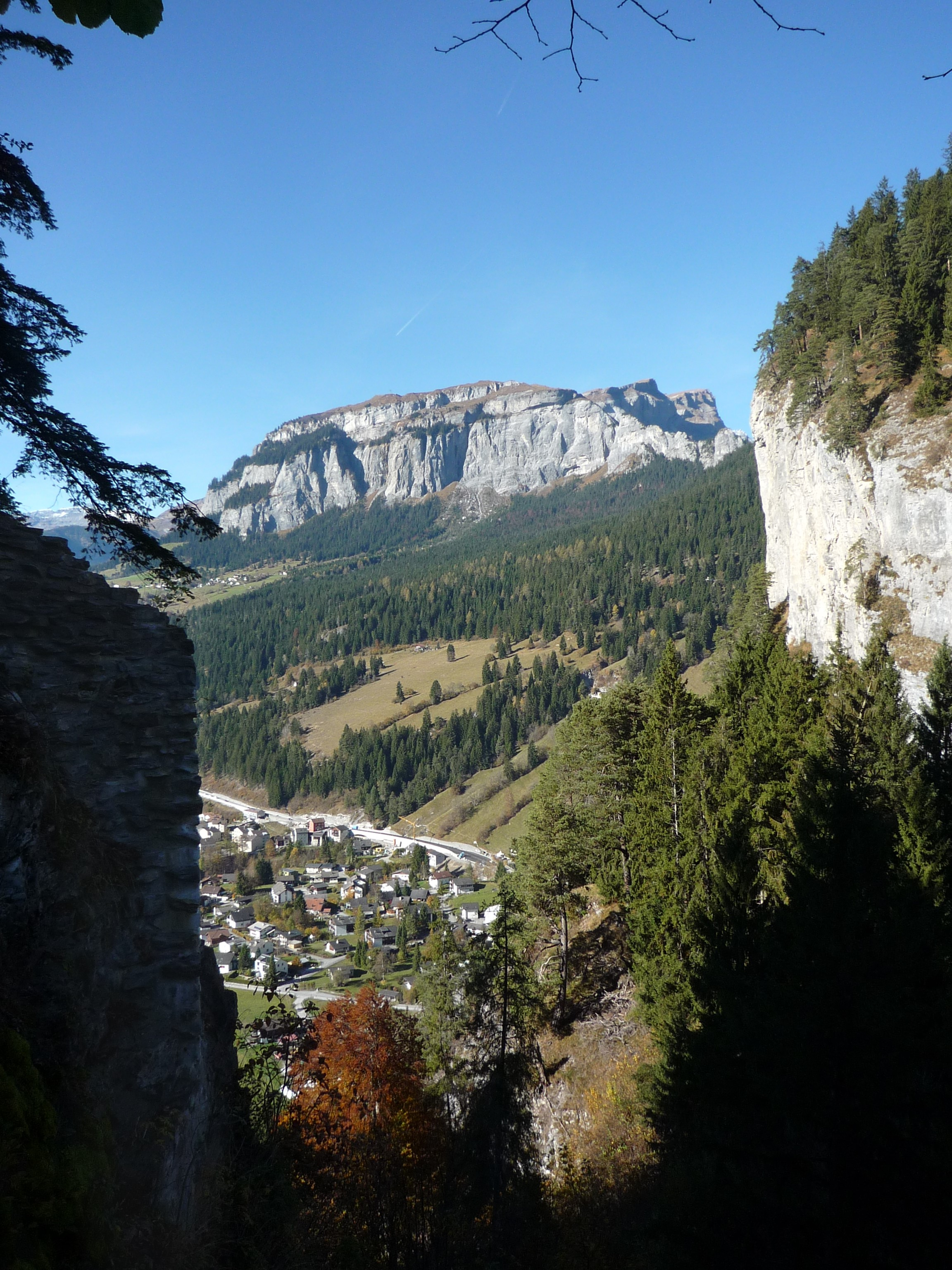
View toward Trin from Sogn Parcazi

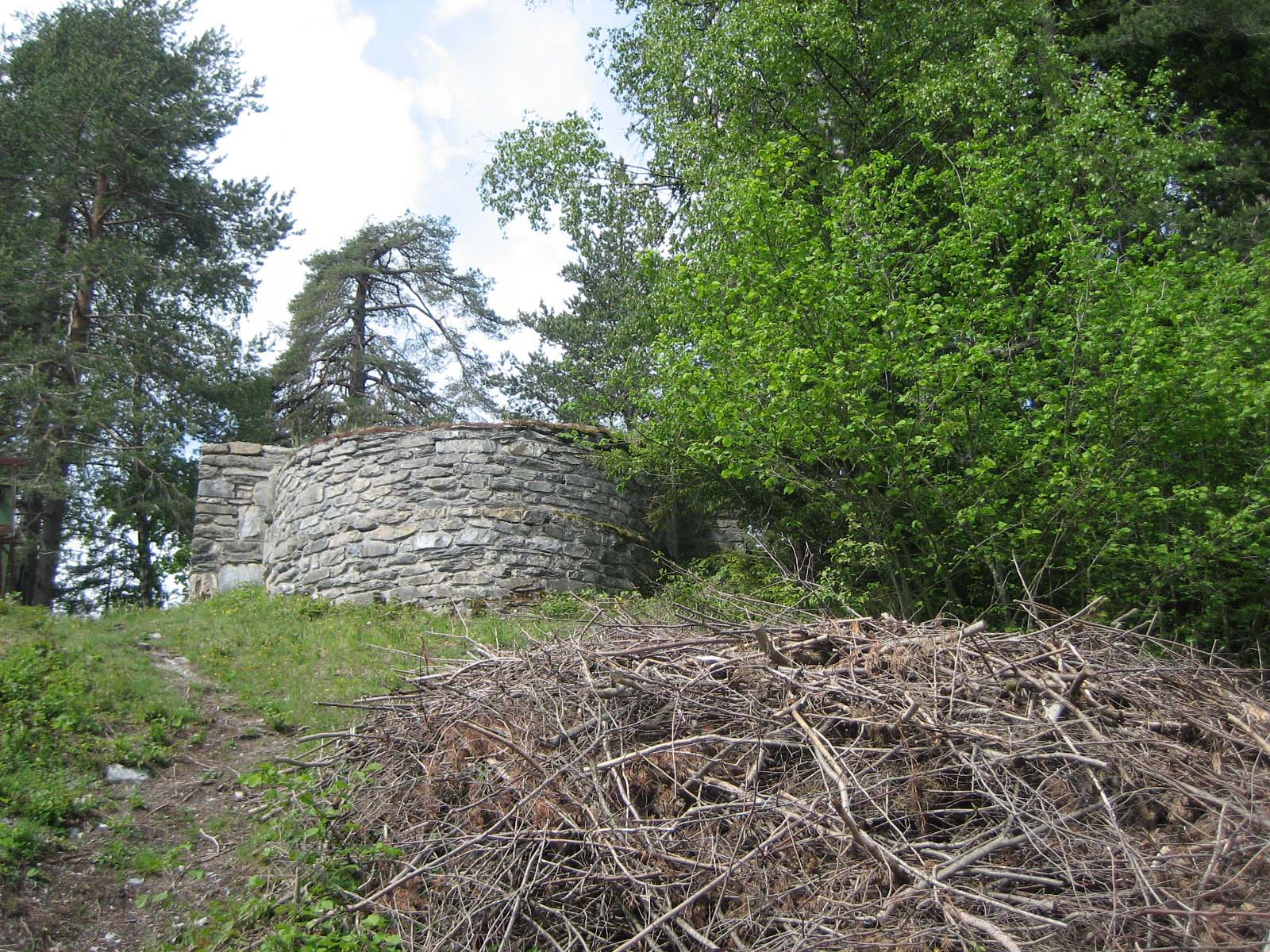
Apse of the church

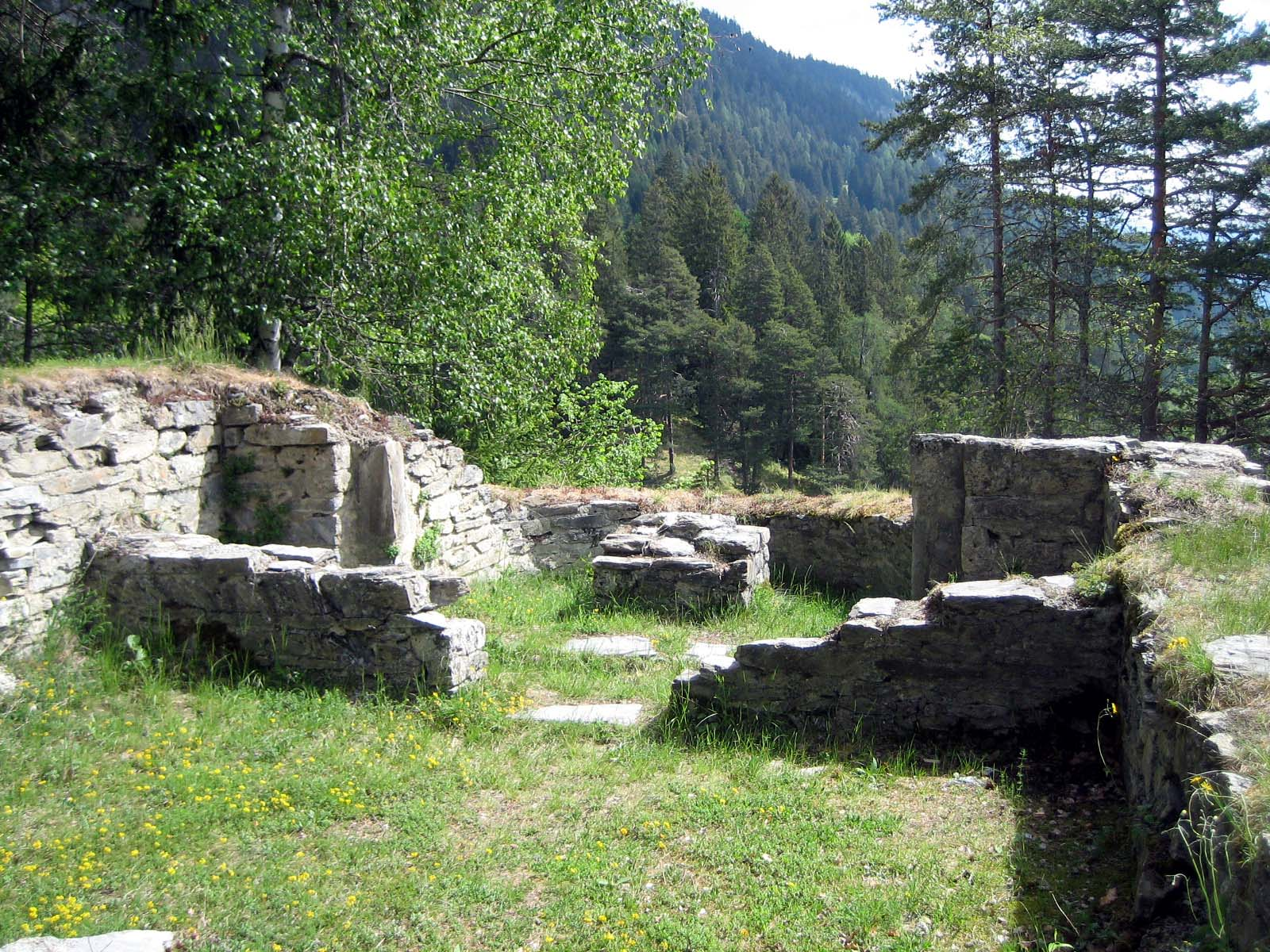
Church at Crap Sogn Parcazi

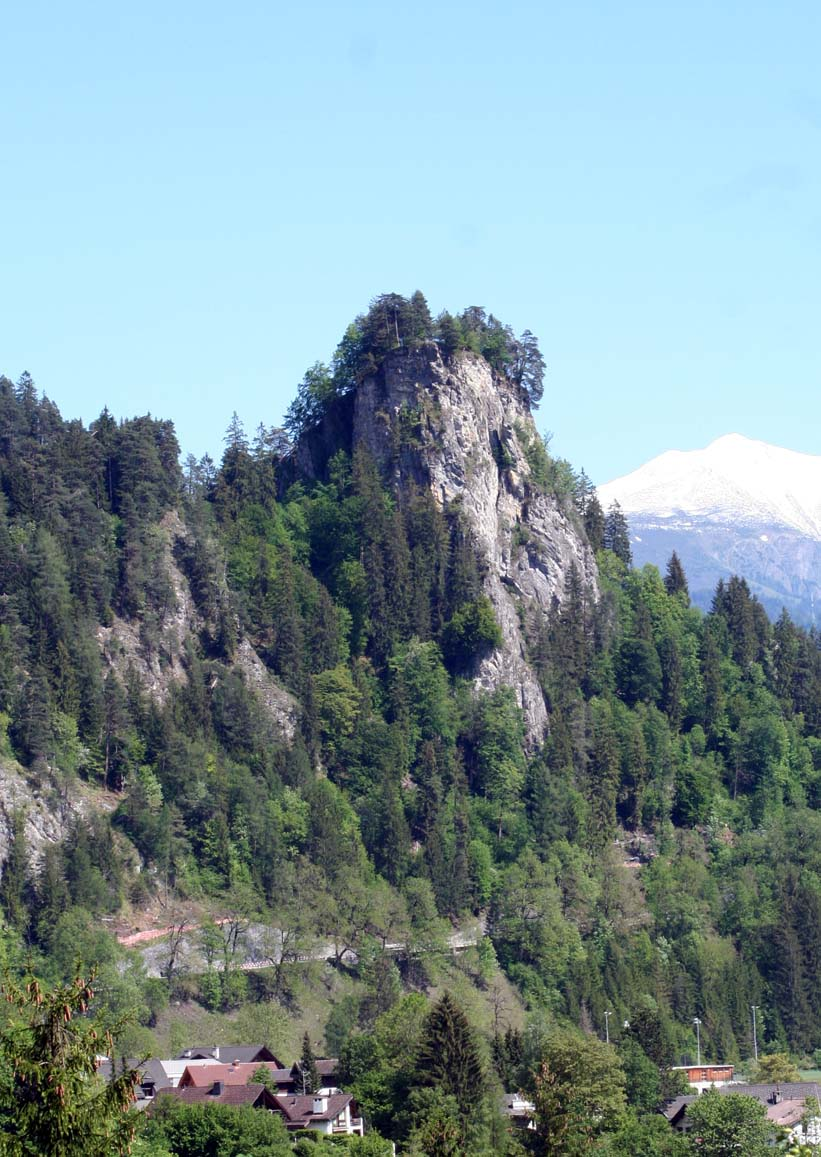
Crap Sogn Parcazi above Trin

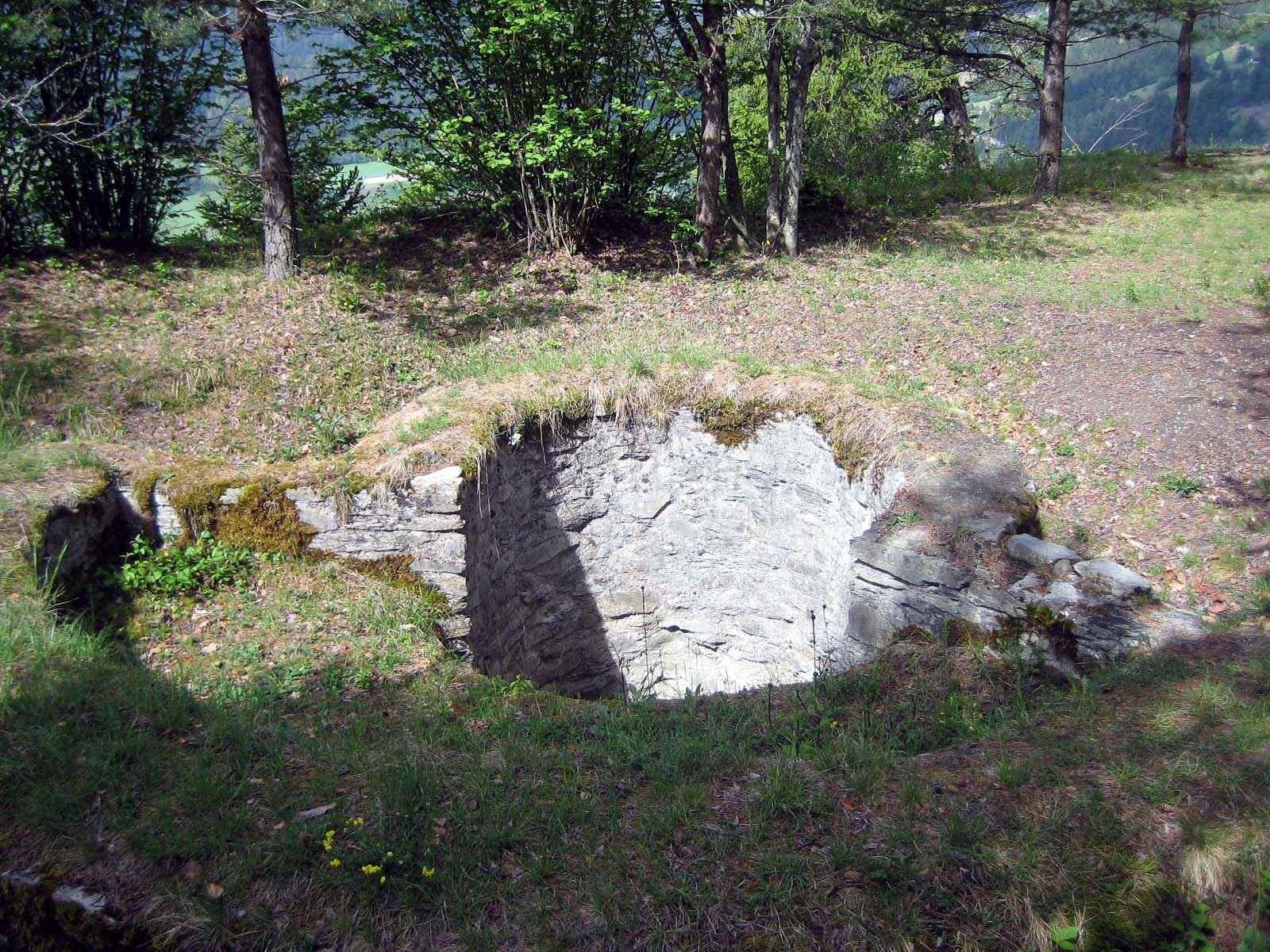
Cistern at the castle

== See also ==
- List of castles in Switzerland
