= Kvamsøy, Sogndal =

Island in Vestland, Norway

Kvamsøy
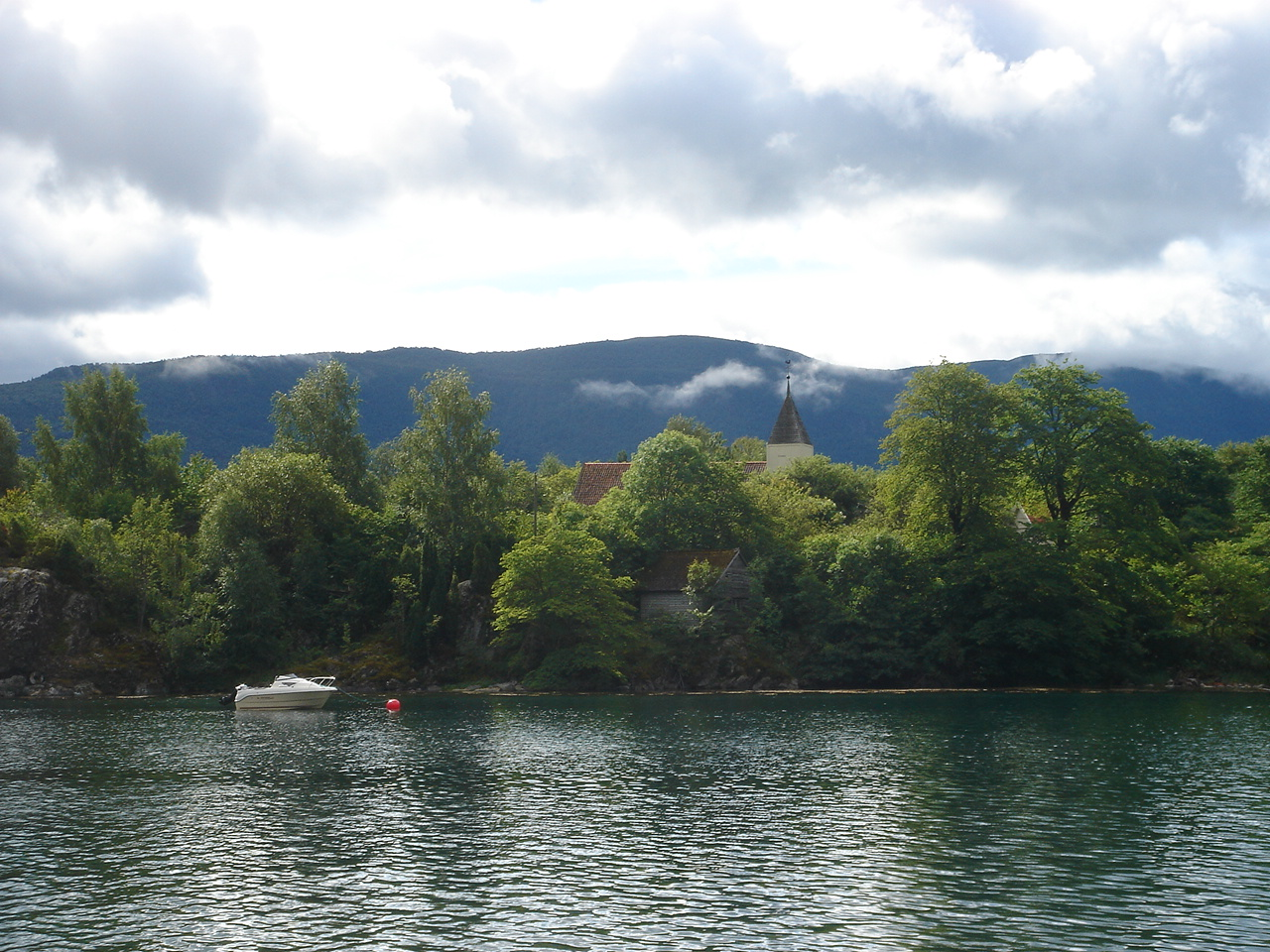
- Interactive map of Kvamsøy

Geography
- Location: Vestland, Norway
- Coordinates: 61.1276°N 6.4832°E
- Area: 80 ha (200 acres)
- Length: 475 m (1558 ft)
- Width: 230 m (750 ft)
- Coastline: 1.3 km (0.81 mi)
- Highest elevation: 16 m (52 ft)

Administration
- Norway
- County: Vestland
- Municipality: Sogndal Municipality

Kvamsøy is a small island in Sogndal Municipality in Vestland county, Norway. The 80-hectare (200-acre) island lies in the Sognefjorden, just off the coast of the village of Kvamme. The island lies about 150 metres (490 ft) off the coast. The village of Vikøyri lies about 7 kilometres (4.3 mi) to the southeast (across the fjord) and the village of Balestrand lies about 10 kilometres (6.2 mi) to the north.

The island is notable because it is home to the historic Kvamsøy Church which was built around the year 1300. It was the centre of the Kvamsøy parish for hundreds of years, serving the southern part of the old Balestrand Municipality. The church was used until 1903 when it was closed down and replaced by the newly built Sæle Church, a short distance away on the mainland.

== See also ==
- List of islands of Norway
