= Sogns Tidend =

Norwegian newspaper

Sogns Tidend was a Norwegian newspaper, published in Sogndal Municipality in Sogn og Fjordane county. It was named Sogns Tidende from 1878 to 1927.

It started as Sogns Tidende in 1878 by Otto Blehr. Blehr was a Liberal Party politician, and Sogns Tidende in general sided with the party. In March 1903 it incorporated the more radically liberal, and Landsmål, newspaper Sygna. The editor-in-chief for many years was Jens Kvåle, formerly of Sygna.

The newspaper stopped after its issue on 31 March 1942, during the occupation of Norway by Nazi Germany. It resumed on 17 May 1945, but was incorporated into Sogn og Fjordane after its final issue on 17 January 1947.
