= Hermansverk =

Village in Sogndal Municipality, Norway

Hermansverk / Leikanger Systrond
- Village
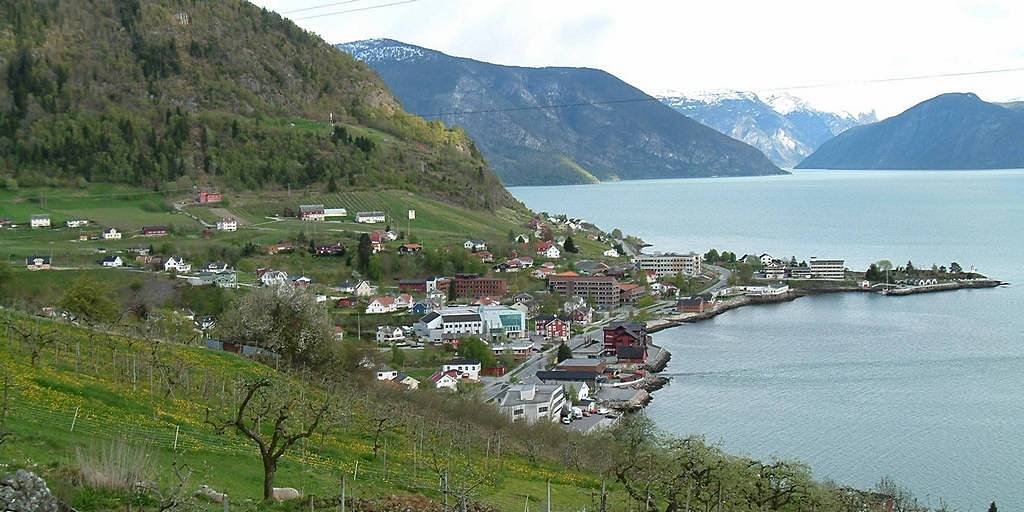
- View of the village area
- Interactive map of Hermansverk / Leikanger
- Location within Vestland Location within Norway
- Coordinates: 61.18301°N 6.85176°E
- Country: Norway
- Region: Western Norway
- County: Vestland
- District: Sogn
- Municipality: Sogndal Municipality

Area
  - Total: 2.04 km^{2} (0.79 sq mi)
- Elevation: 4 m (13 ft)

Population (2024)
  - Total: 2,294
  - Density: 1,125/km^{2} (2,910/sq mi)
- Time zone: UTC+01:00 (CET)
  - Summer (DST): UTC+02:00 (CEST)
- Post Code: 6863 Leikanger

Hermansverk or Leikanger is the administrative centre of Sogndal Municipality in Vestland County, Norway. The village also serves as the seat of the County Governor of Vestland County.

The 2.04-square-kilometre (500-acre) village of Hermansverk/Leikanger has a population (2025) of 2,294 and a population density of 1,125 inhabitants per square kilometre (2,910/sq mi).

== History ==
Originally, two small villages (Hermansverk and Leikanger) sat about 1.5 kilometres (0.93 mi) apart on the northern shore of the Sognefjorden in Leikanger Municipality. Norwegian National Road 13 connected both areas. The main church for the area, Leikanger Church, was located in Leikanger, and the municipal and county administration was located in Hermansverk. Over the years, the two villages grew together, and since the late-20th century, they are now effectively one large village, and the government considers them one urban settlement. The government refers to the village as "Hermansverk/Leikanger". The names can also be used interchangeably. The urban area is also now known as Systrond.

From 1838 until 2020, the village served as the administrative centre of both Leikanger Municipality and also Sogn og Fjordane county (the county capital was usually referred to as Leikanger, not Hermansverk).

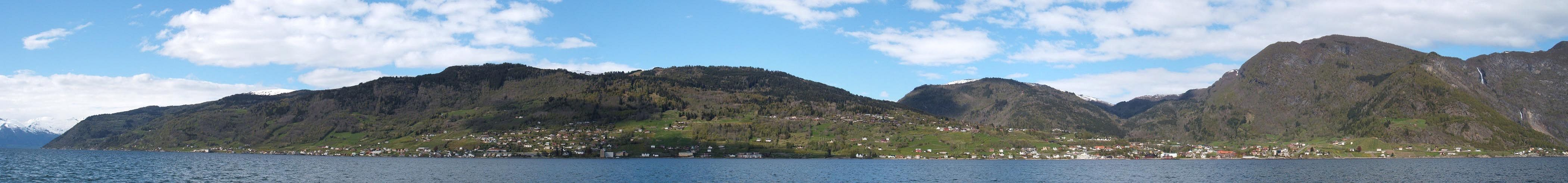
View of Systrond (Scroll to see Leikanger on the left and Hermansverk on the right)
