= Mustad (surname) =

Mustad is a surname. Notable people with the surname include:

- Halfdan Magnus Mustad (1874–1967), Norwegian businessman
- Hans Mustad (1837–1918), Norwegian businessman
- Hans Clarin Hovind Mustad (1871–1948), Norwegian businessman
- Kristian Mauritz Mustad (1848–1913), Norwegian politician
- Nicolai Christian Mustad (1878–1970), Norwegian businessman and art collector
- Ole Hovelsen Mustad (1810–1884), Norwegian businessperson and politician
- Sigbjørn Mustad (1897–1970), Norwegian lawyer and politician
