= Hans Clarin Hovind Mustad =

Norwegian businessman

Hans Clarin Hovind Mustad (22 November 1871 – 1 January 1948) was a Norwegian businessman.

== Personal life ==
He was born in Vardal Municipality as the son of Hans Mustad and Clara Laurentse Marie Henriette Mustad (born Hovind). On the maternal side he was a great-grandson of Hieronymus Heyerdahl, and on the paternal side he was a grandson of Ole Hovelsen Mustad, great-grandson of Hans Schikkelstad, nephew of Kristian Mauritz Mustad and cousin of Sigbjørn Mustad.

Clarin Mustad married Nathalia Fischer Schneider (1881–1936). In 1912 he bought the property Sjøholmen, between Høvikodden and Sandvika in Bærum Municipality. One of their daughters Elma Anne Lise became a horse rider, and married a man of the Kielland family. His daughter Clara married Jacob Moestue, in a wedding attended by Crown Prince Olav and Crown Princess Märtha of Norway. His daughter Nathalia, nicknamed Oja, was married to Tomm Murstad from 1941 to 1963.

== Career ==
=== Mustad ===
He took his secondary education in Kristiania from 1884 to 1888, and a technical education in Trondhjem from 1888 to 1889 and in the Technikum Mittweida from 1889 to 1892. He then became manager of the factory Duclair in France. Together with his four brothers, he joined his father as co-owner of the company O. Mustad & Søn in 1905. The company had been passed from his great-grandfather through the generations, and grown significantly since its beginnings in Vardal. In 1875, the company had expanded with a new factory at Lilleaker in Kristiania, followed in 1889 by a foundry at the same place as well as a new margarine factory. In addition, the company expanded abroad. When Hans Mustad died in 1918, his sons inherited the largest industrial company in Norway, with 2,000 domestic employees as well as several factories abroad. The expansion continued after 1918, and the company eventually became the world's largest producer of fish hooks. Despite the ownership change, the name O. Mustad & Søn was kept. After Clarin's death, however, it was converted to a limited company (1970) and split into different branches (1977 and 1997).

=== Automobile pioneer ===
Clarin Mustad was also involved in the emerging car industry. Having travelled by car for the first time in 1892, during a stay abroad, he conducted his first car travel on Norwegian soil in 1906. During the trip, from Kristiania to Aandalsnes, he passed several hundred horses, and stopped the engine as to not frighten the animals. Using an external handle to start the engine, he grew tired of this and invented a system with which the driver could ignite the engine from the driver's seat.

In 1917 he was behind the manufacturing of the Mustad car. However, only one car was produced, followed by another in 1935. The first was a very large vehicle with six wheels, nicknamed the giant, the second was small with only one seat, nicknamed the egoist. The former car was equipped with directional headlamps, which would become more widespread later. It was a part of an automobile exposition in Paris in 1922. Both cars are now on exhibition at the Norwegian Museum of Historic Vehicles in Lillehammer.

In addition, Clarin Mustad bought the first car in Norway, a Benz & Cie. Phaeton car imported in 1895, when it was taken out of traffic. He gave the car to the interest group KNA in 1929; it is now on exhibit in the Norwegian Museum of Science and Technology.

Mustad was decorated as a Knight First Class of the Order of St. Olav in 1911.
