= Halfdan Magnus Mustad =

Norwegian businessman

Halfdan Magnus Mustad (9 June 1874 – 21 January 1967) was a Norwegian businessman.

He was born in Vardal Municipality as the son of Hans Mustad and Marie Heyerdahl. On the maternal side he was a great-grandson of Hieronymus Heyerdahl, and on the paternal side he was a grandson of Ole Hovelsen Mustad, great-grandson of Hans Schikkelstad, nephew of Kristian Mauritz Mustad and cousin of Sigbjørn Mustad. Halfdan Magnus Mustad married Edle Smith in 1899, and the couple had several children. They settled at Lysaker in Bærum Municipality.

Together with his four brothers, he joined his father as co-owner of the company O. Mustad & Søn in 1905. The company had been passed from his great-grandfather through the generations, and grown significantly since its beginnings in Vardal. In 1875, the company had expanded with a new factory at Lilleaker in Kristiania, followed in 1889 by a foundry at the same place as well as a new margarine factory. In addition, the company expanded abroad. When Hans Mustad died in 1918, his sons inherited the largest industrial company in Norway, with 2,000 domestic employees as well as several factories abroad. The expansion continued after 1918, and the company eventually became the world's largest producer of fish hooks. Despite the ownership change, the name O. Mustad & Søn was kept. For his work, Mustad was decorated with the Royal Norwegian Order of St. Olav in 1936, but he left as co-owner in 1959. After his death, O. Mustad & Søn was converted to a limited company (1970) and split into different branches (1977 and 1997).
