= O. Mustad & Son =

Norwegian fishing tackle manufacturer

Mustad Fishing
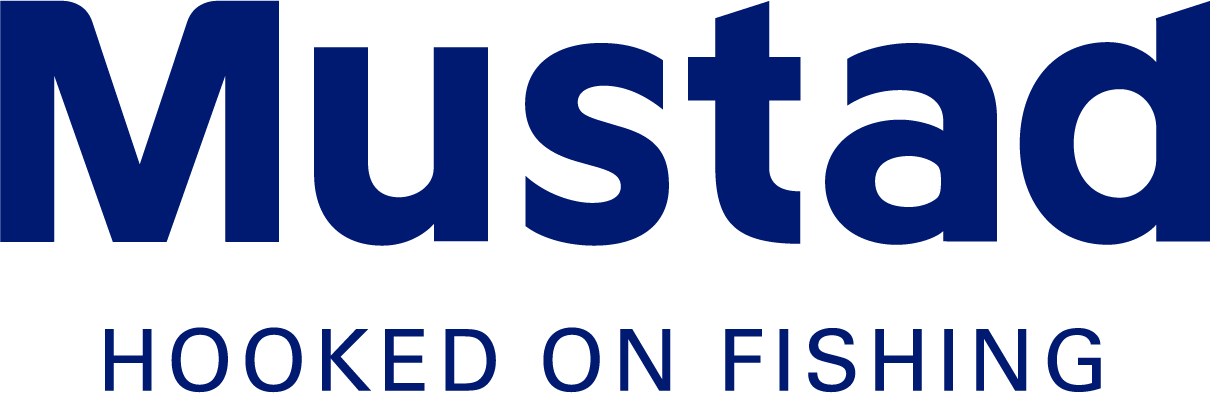
- Native name: O. Mustad & Søn AS
- Company type: Private
- Industry: Fishing tackle
- Founded: 1832
- Founder: Hans Skikkelstad
- Headquarters: Gjøvik, Norway
- Key people: Hans Mustad (Owner 1874-1918)
- Products: Fish hooks Fishing lines Terminal tackle Fishing Gear
- Brands: Key Brand
- Number of employees: 10 (2025)
- Website: Official Website

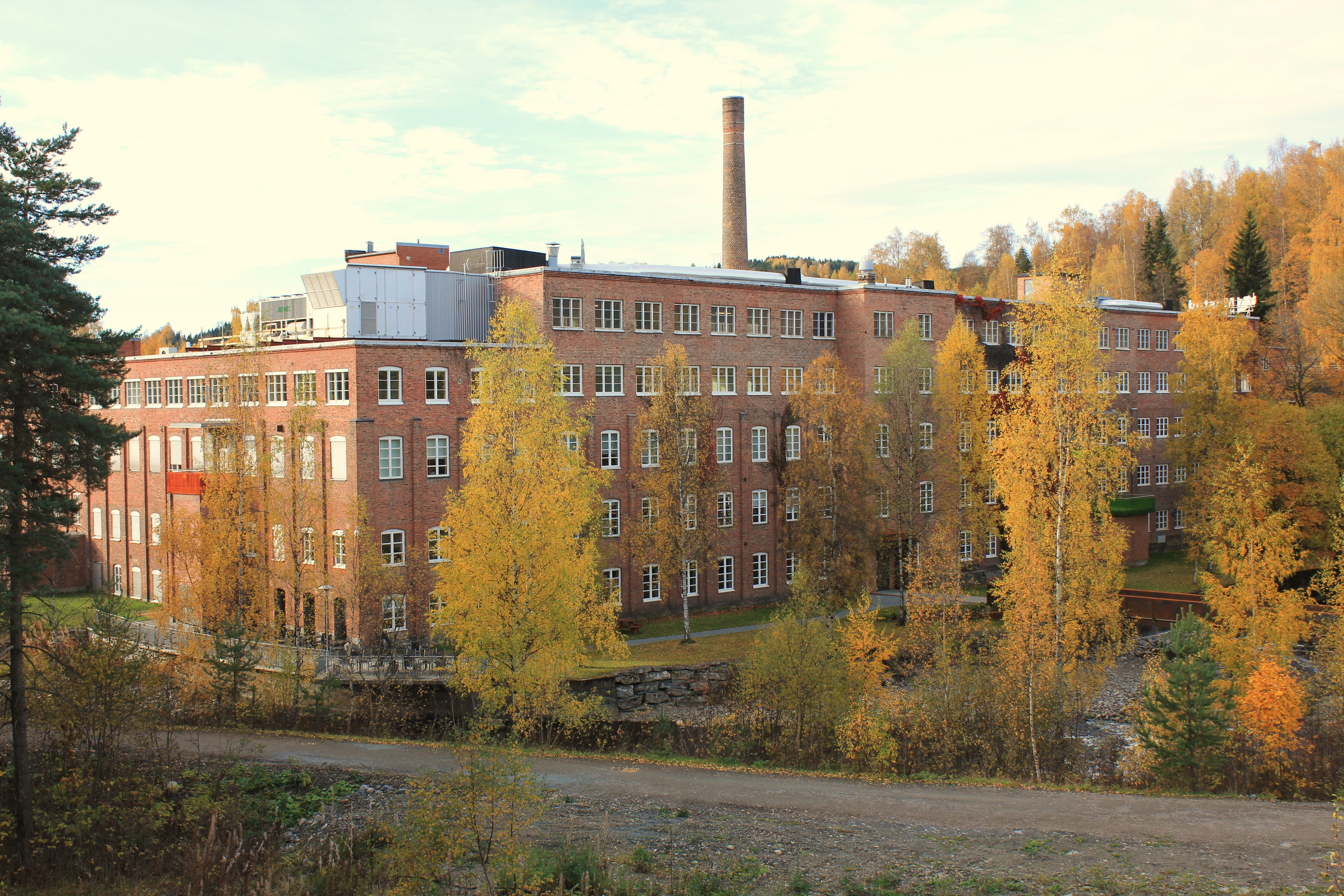
Mustad & Søn AS factory in Gjøvik, Norway

Mustad Fishing (O. Mustad & Søn A.S.) is a Norwegian company that manufactures and sells fishing tackle and accessories since 1877. The Mustad product range includes fish hooks, multifilament and monofilament fishing lines, fishing lures, fishing flies, fly hooks, terminal tackle and fishing apparel. The corporate headquarters are in Gjøvik, Norway.

== Mustad Fishing Today ==
Mustad has expanded from their core business of manufacturing hooks and terminal tackle to a varied range of other fishing accessories.

Sales offices have been established in Miami, FL (USA), Singapore and Wuxi (China), and has production facilities in Norway, China, Singapore, Portugal, and Malaysia. Mustad's products are present in more than 160 countries.

The company was run by the 6th generation Mustad until the end of 2011, when Mustad was sold to the Norwegian-based investment company, NLI Utvikling (now ARD Group AS). In 2017, a majority of shares were then sold to Verdane Capital, another investment company.

== History ==
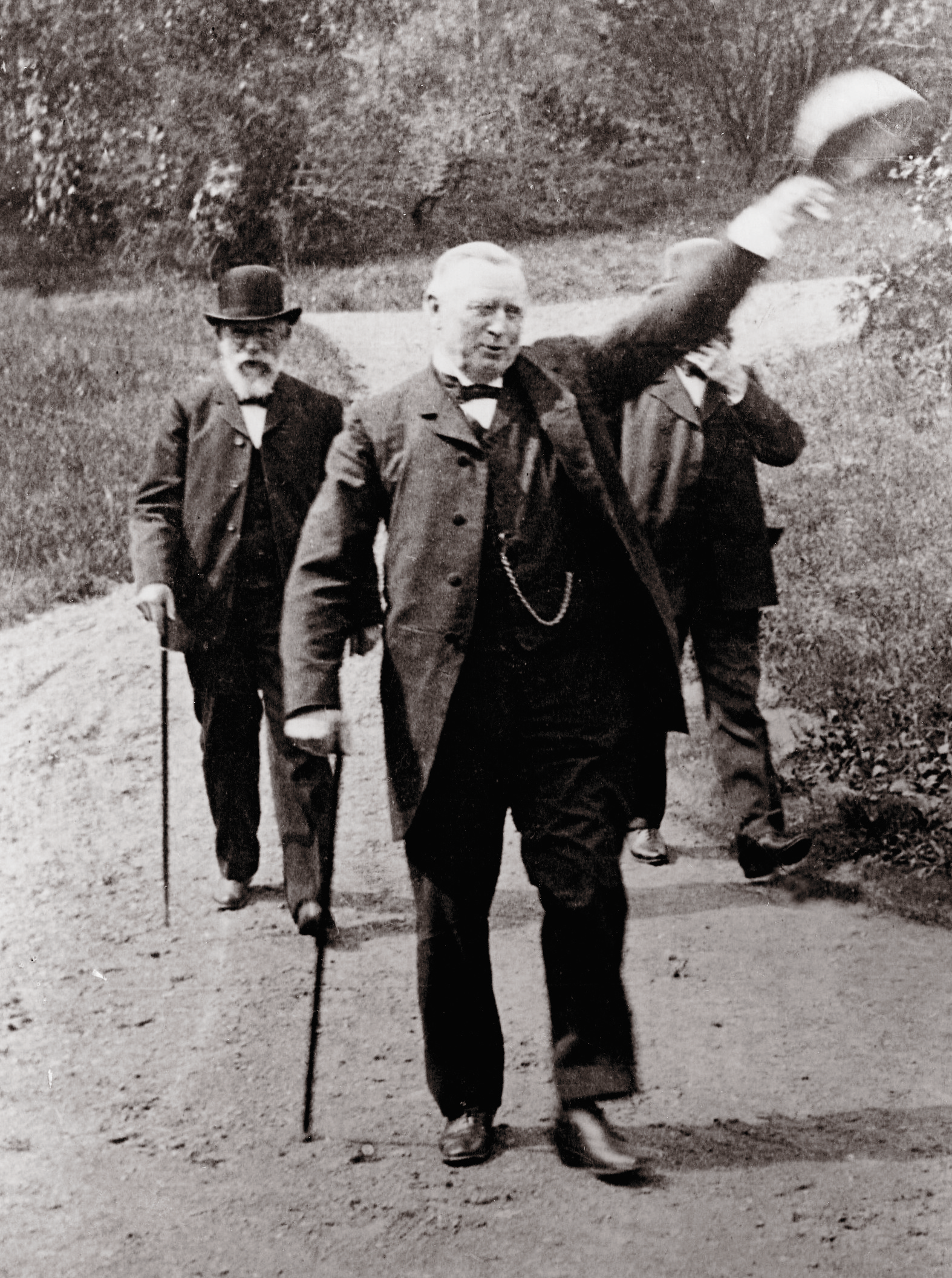
Hans Mustad (1873-1918)

Mustad can trace its roots back to 1832 in Vardal. Hans Schikkelstad (1789–1843), a farmer, established the factory "Brusveen Spiger- og Staltradfabrikk" for the production of nails, steel wire and various metal products. Later, Skikkelstad's son-in-law Ole Hovelsen Mustad (1810–84), took over the company with his son Hans Mustad (1837–1918) and changed its name to "O. Mustad" and later "O. Mustad & Søn". The company was headquartered in the small village of Gjøvik (Norway), an area with poor infrastructures where transportation was an obstacle to most type of supplies.

=== Growing to other markets ===
In spite of the negative conditions and the pessimistic visions of the Norwegian Department of Interior ("The difficulty in competing with foreign factories means that industry will never succeed in this country"), by 1860 Ole Mustad led his company to a primary position in the production of small metal products like fencing wire, nails, pins, fish hooks, horseshoe nails, shipbuilding nails, paper clips, thumb tacks and a series of other metallic wire-based products.

Over the years, Mustad was a crucial part of Gjøvik and the region as a large number of the population was involved with the company and its many products. In addition to products made of metal wire, Mustad tested the waters of many other markets. Ovens and waffle presses were in production for many years and are still found today. For over 100 years, Mustad also competed in the butter industry in Norway.

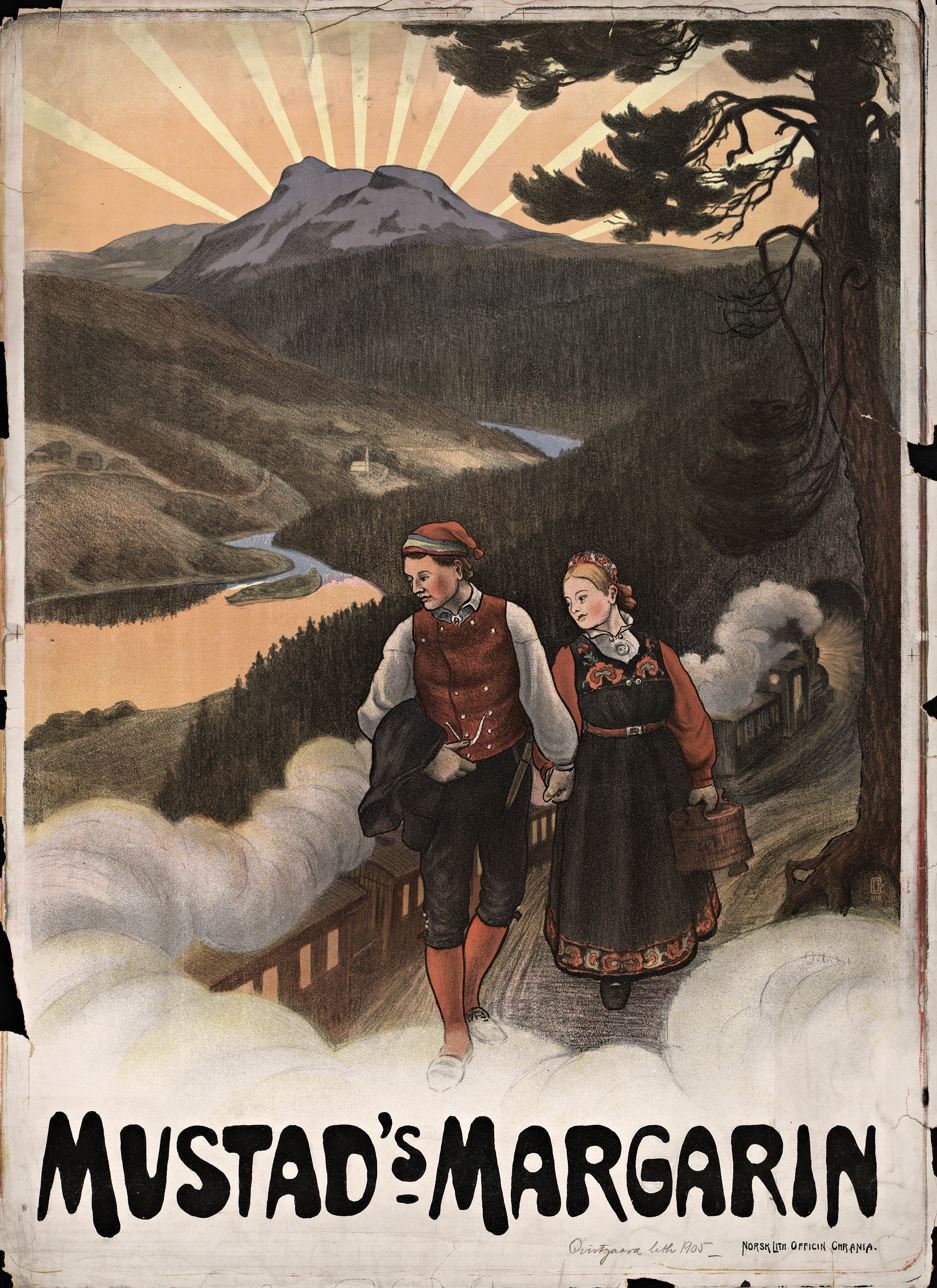
Mustad Margarine ad from 1905

=== Finding focus ===
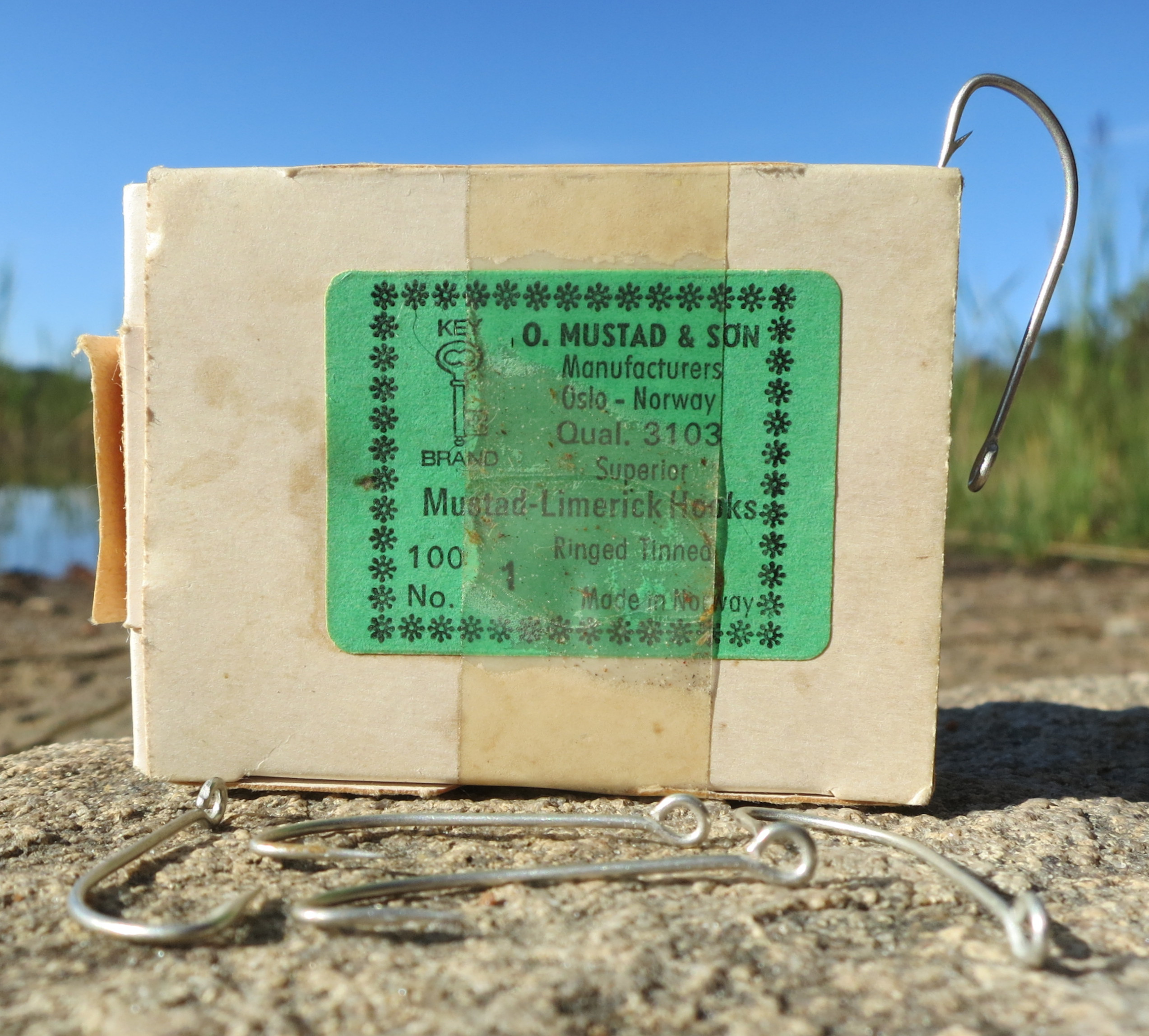
1970s fishing hooks by O. Mustad & Son

A key to the company's success was the efforts made by Mathias Topp, a carpenter turned inventor who designed and created a machine to create hooks automatically and quickly. His first successful machine produced hooks efficiently and quicker than ever before. Feeding wire into the machine led to a cut, bent, barbed, and pointed hook. Knowing the importance of this invention to the company, Topp and the Mustad family worked to keep the secret by, instead of ordering a patent, restricting workers from getting near the machines and signing non-disclosure agreements. By refining and industrializing the manual production of fish hooks in 1877, the company managed to become a global market leader in just a few years.

=== The Core of Gjøvik ===
The growth and successes of the 1870s were followed by recession, mirroring the overall European crisis. The stagnation of the building activities resulted in a decreasing demand for nails. Hans Mustad, who had taken the management over, experienced a very critical time which brought him to the suspension of all payments in 1879. Fear took hold of creditors and employees, as so many other companies had gone bankrupt in the same period. Employees continued working without payment for 2 years. They received "Mustad banknotes" instead: the notes acted as written acknowledgments from Mustad and were accepted by shops in Gjøvik. The whole debt including interests was paid back by July 1882 and all creditors got their check. Since then, the company assumed wider responsibilities over employees and their families: children were provided schools and several recreational and welfare activities were offered. Hans Mustad's social disposition attracted attention of the press that started visiting the factory premises and its schools, band, choir, library and shop.

=== Wars ===
These years were also crucial for the international development of the company. The obstacles at the time were mainly protectionism and tariffs: the decision was taken to start production within the international markets with the biggest potential. A nail factory was established in Finland in 1886, shortly followed by horseshoe nail factories in France (Duclair, 1891) and Sweden (Dalsland, 1898). Just before World War I, Europe consisted of five great powers (the United Kingdom, France, Germany, Austria-Hungary and Russia), plus another two nations were large consumers of horseshoe nails (Italy and Spain). In 1913 Mustad was established in all of them with the exception of Russia. Localisation criteria for the plants were mainly the access to energy, raw materials and transportation.

The decentralized strategic approach proved very effective for Mustad when - after World War II - the company lost all its factories behind the Iron Curtain, including about 8,000 employees. The independent structures survived the war and grew rapidly to new successes.

In the second half of the 20th century Mustad has increasingly diversified its interests into many different businesses, mostly based upon metallic wire, but also expanding into food and machinery: paper clips (of which Mustad turned out 70 million pieces a year), mattress springs, zippers, screws, margarine (which was produced for over 100 years and discontinued only in 1996), machines for the paper industry and for the manufacturing of boxes.

== Family ownership ==
After Hans Schikkelstad started the business, it was his son-in-law Ole Mustad who took over upon his death. With the help of his son Hans, Ole grew the business beyond nails and wire. From 1874 to the death of Ole, The two were co-owners of O. Mustad & Søn. Ole Mustad died in 1884, leaving his son as the single owner. Hans' five sons became co-owners in 1905. These were Ole Mustad Jr. (1870–1954), Hans Clarin Hovind Mustad (1871–1948), Halfdan Magnus Mustad (1874–1967), Wilhelm Martin Christie Mustad (1877–1961) and Nicolai Christian Mustad (1878–1970).
