= Tomm Murstad =

Norwegian skier, coach and businessman

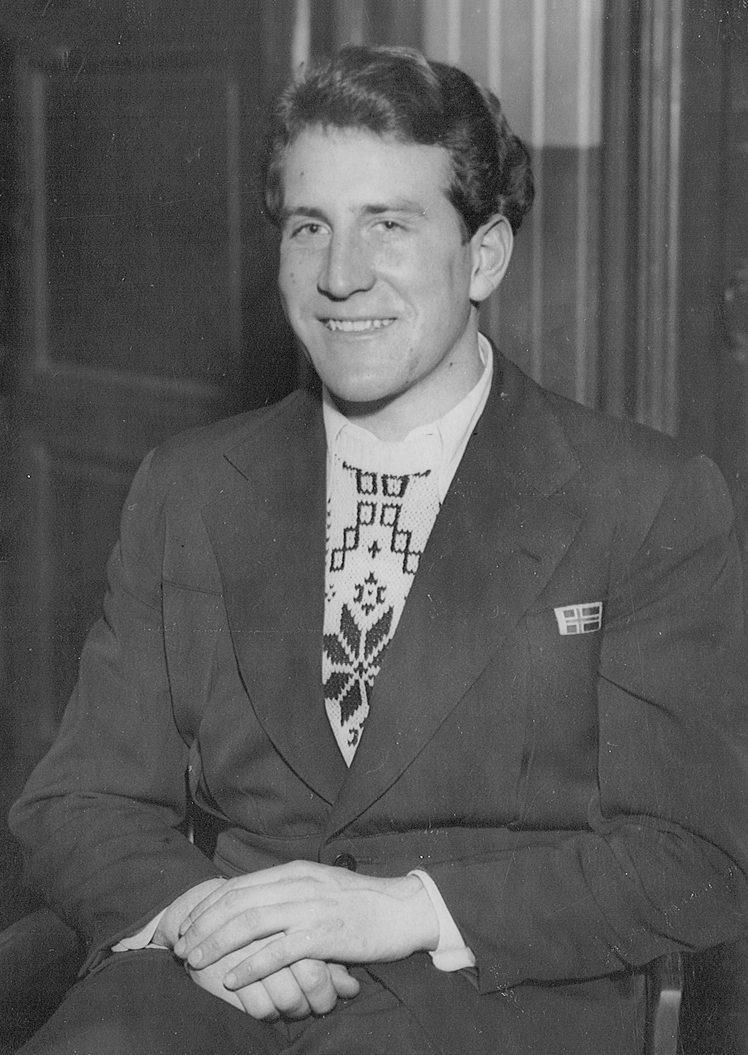
- Murstad in the 1930s
- Born: 2 July 1915; Fredrikstad, Norway
- Died: 19 January 2001 (aged 85); Oslo, Norway
- Other name: Onkel Tomm
- Occupations: skier, coach
- Known for: Marka, Oslo ski school
- Spouses: Nathalia "Oja" Mustad (m. 1941–1969) Nena Gretta Godfrey (m. 1970)
- Parents: Hjalmar Murstad (father); Elisabeth Korneliussen (mother)
- Awards: HM The King's Medal of Merit

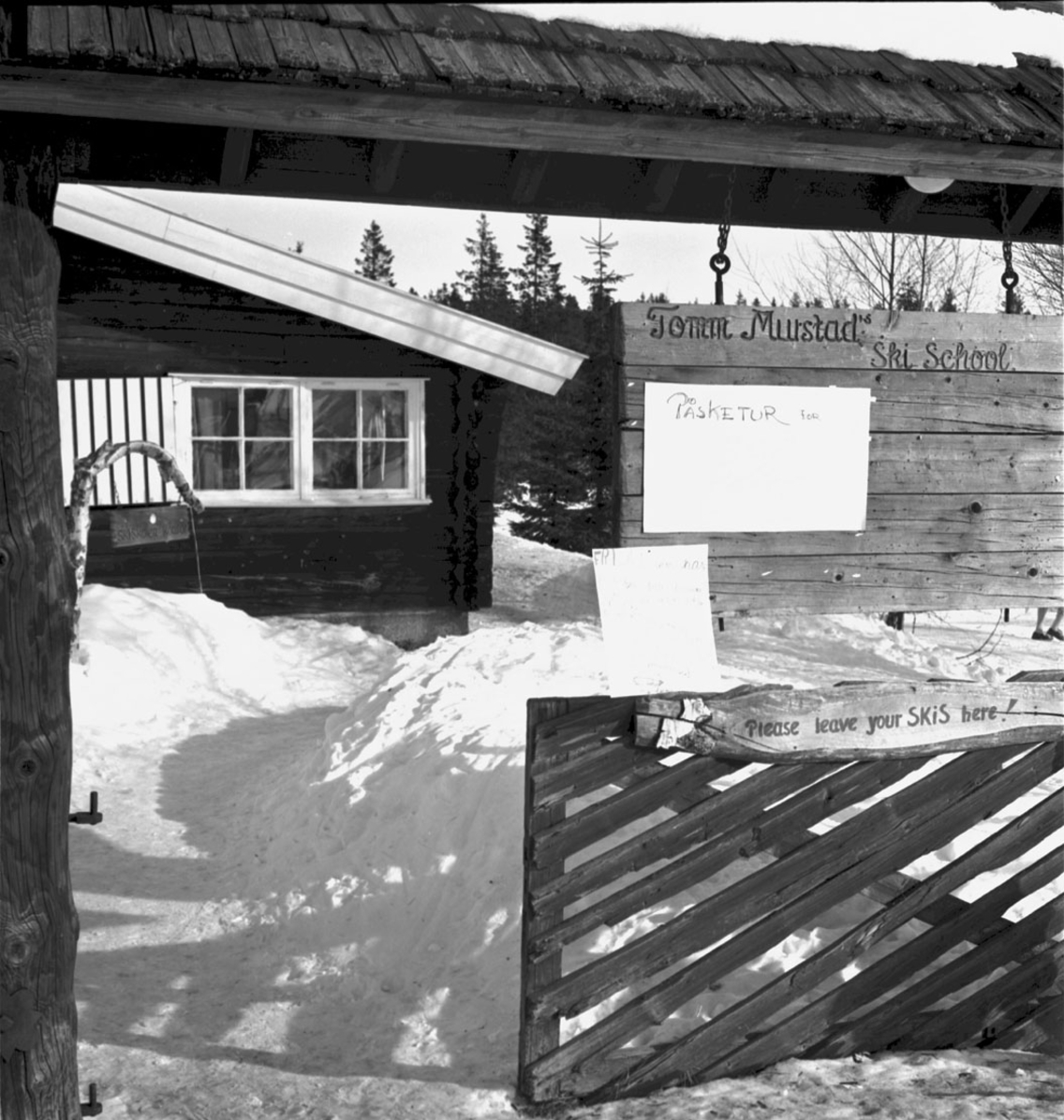
Murstad's ski school in Norway

Tomm Murstad (2 July 1915 – 19 January 2001) was a Norwegian skier, coach and business man.

He was born in Fredrikstad as a son of physician Hjalmar Murstad (1883–1940) and Elisabeth Korneliussen (1887–1968). He grew up at Vinderen. He was married to Nathalia "Oja" Mustad, daughter of Hans Clarin Hovind Mustad and granddaughter of Hans Mustad, from 1941 to 1969, and then to Nena Gretta Godfrey from 1970.

Murstad began skiing as a youngster, with emphasis on alpine skiing and ski jumping. He eventually became an alpine skiing instructor in France, and spent summers at the Riviera where he held water skiing shows. In late 1934 he opened a skiing school in Marka, Oslo. During the following years he traveled between Norway, France and United States to stage shows, go on public relation tours and run the skiing school. In the United States he visited New York City, Boston and Chicago, where 100,000 people attended his indoor ski jumping hill shows.

During World War II his skiing school was closed. After the war he opened ski schools for children near Tryvann in Norway. The children were brought there from downtown Oslo in a separate tram car, embarking from Majorstua station. Ahead of the 1952 Winter Olympics he was the coach of Norway's alpine skiing team. The team included Stein Eriksen, who later joined Murstad in summertime water skiing shows. Murstad also ran a sports clothing store. In 1960 he started an eponymous summer camp for youths, with emphasis on water sports and maritime safety. He used the moniker "Onkel Tomm", a direct translation of Uncle Tom.

In 1980 he was decorated with the HM The King's Medal of Merit in gold. He died in January 2001 in Oslo. His ventures are now run by Tomm Murstad Jr.
