= Hans Schikkelstad =

Norwegian politician

Hans Hansen Schikkelstad (4 September 1789 – 29 March 1843) was a Norwegian farmer, businessperson and politician. He was the founder of the business which became O. Mustad & Søn.

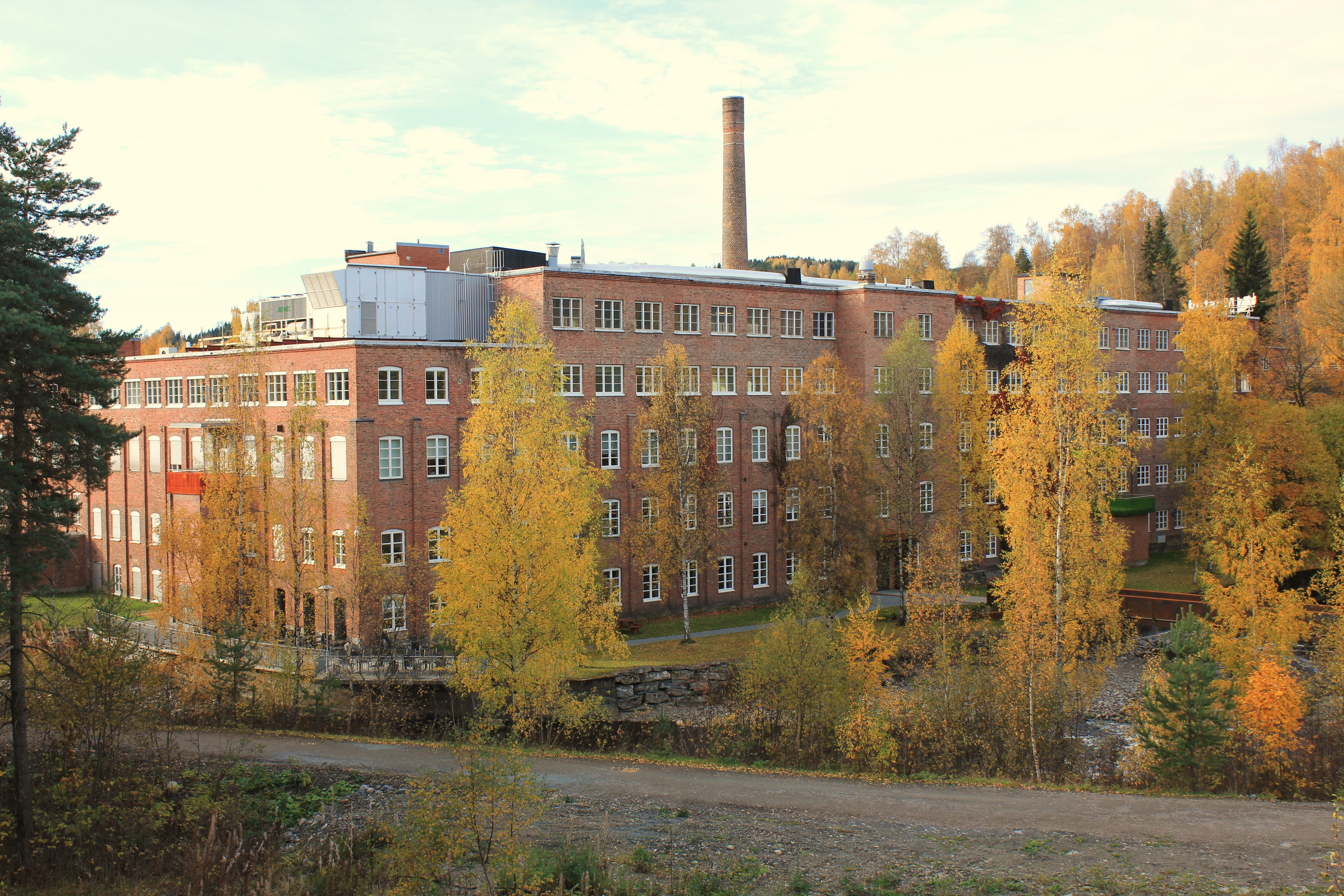
O. Mustad & Søn factory premises at Gjøvik

Hans Schikkelstad was born in the parish of Vardal (in the present-day Gjøvik Municipality) in Christians amt (county), Norway. He was raised on the Bråstad farm and in 1809 purchased the nearby Schikkelstad farm.

In 1832 he had started the company Brusveen Spiger og Ståltrådfabrikk in Vardal. The factory produced wire and nails. In 1843 the company was taken over by his son-in-law Ole Mustad, who changed the name of the company to O. Mustad, and gradually expanded into other fields. When his son Hans Mustad became co-owner in 1874, the name of the company was changed to O. Mustad & Son A.S.

Schikkelstad was elected to the Norwegian Parliament in 1833, representing the constituency of Christians amt (now part of Innlandet county). He served only one term.

Hans Schikkelstad was married to Marthe Gulbrandsdatter Etnestrand (1794–ca. 1875). They had three children including Anne Marie Schikkelstad (1816–90), who married Ole Mustad. Schikkelstad was also a great-grandfather of Sigbjørn Mustad, and thus grandfather of Kristian Mauritz Mustad. Both these people became members of Parliament.
