= Carl Herman Halvorsen =

Norwegian politician

Carl Herman Halvorsen (15 October 1837 – 1918) was a Norwegian jurist and politician.

In 1872 Halvorsen bought the farm Blommenholm east of Sandvika. From 1876 he partitioned and sold parcels, mostly to town dwellers. He worked as a solicitor at that time, and in 1873 he was elected to serve in Bærum municipal council. He served until 1898, and was mayor from 1882 to 1886 and 1982 to 1898. From 1889 to 1891 he was a deputy representative to the Norwegian Parliament.

In 1898, Halvorsen sold the entire Blommenholm farm in 1898, except for the area Sjøholmen, where he moved into a newly erected Swiss-style villa. He moved to Kristiania in 1907.

He was the treasurer of the banks Kristiania Haandværkeres Sparekasse from 1874 to 1890 and Kristiania Sparebank from 1890 to 1914. He was a member of the board of the fire insurance organization Akershus Brandassuranceforening from 1878 to 1890 and 1892 to 1914, and chaired the board of Bærums Sparebank from 1891 to 1895.

Halvorsen was decorated with the Royal Norwegian Order of St. Olav. A road at Blommenholm, Halvorsens vei, has been named after him.

Political offices
Preceded by Carl A. B. Heltzen	Mayor of Bærum; 1882–1886	Succeeded by Hans Hansen Oust
Preceded by Kristian Gløersen	Mayor of Bærum; 1892–1898	Succeeded by Christian Fredrik Michelet
