= Sjøholmen =

Area of Bærum, Norway

Coordinates: 59.89212°N 10.54130°E

Sjøholmen is an area between Sandvika and Høvikodden in Bærum, Norway. Originally farmland, it was used as a residential property from 1898, and then for various municipal institutions since the 1970s.

== History ==
The area is located east of Sandvika, west of Høvikodden and southwest of the population centre Blommenholm. In medieval times, Sjøholmen belonged to the farm Blommenholm, which in turn was a part of the estate Nesøygodset. A cotter's farm was later established at Sjøholmen. From 1872, when the Drammen Line was opened through Bærum, the largely rural municipality went through a suburbanization process. Jurist Carl Herman Halvorsen bought Blommenholm in the same year, and from 1876 he partitioned and sold parcels, mostly to town dwellers. Halvorsen—who also served as mayor of Bærum—then sold the entire Blommenholm farm in 1898, except for Sjøholmen, where he moved into a newly erected Swiss-style villa.

Halvorsen moved to the city in 1907, but some years later Sjøholmen was bought by automobile designer Clarin Mustad. Under his ownership, the property was used for fruit cultivation and poultry breeding. A stable and a bathing hut were erected, and the villa was redesigned in 1920 by architect Arnstein Arneberg. Also, a part of the garden was used as a private graveyard.

After Clarin Mustad's death in 1948 the property was passed on to his son, before being bought by Fred. Olsen in 1970. It was bought by Bærum municipality shortly thereafter. The property now houses several municipal-run institutions: the extracurricular Municipal School of Music and Culture; the alternative school Sandviksbukta; as well as Sjøholmen Maritime Center, where primary school children are educated in proper conduct at sea. The maritime center also rents out of boats and canoes. The islands south of Sandvika, chiefly Borøya, are accessible by canoe.

== Transport ==
Sjøholmen is associated with boat transport, and the area is accessible by foot as a part of the so-called coastal pathway. Two parallel roads runs north of Sjøholmen, separating it from Blommenholm, namely the Norwegian National Road 164 and the European route E18 highway. Parts of the Sjøholmen property were consumed when the highway was built in 1963–1964.

In terms of public transport, Sjøholmen is served by the lines 151, 169 and 262 of the Ruter bus network; the proximate bus station is named Blommenholm. In addition, the town of Sandvika with its railway station is within walking distance.
