= Hunnselva =

River in Innlandet, Norway

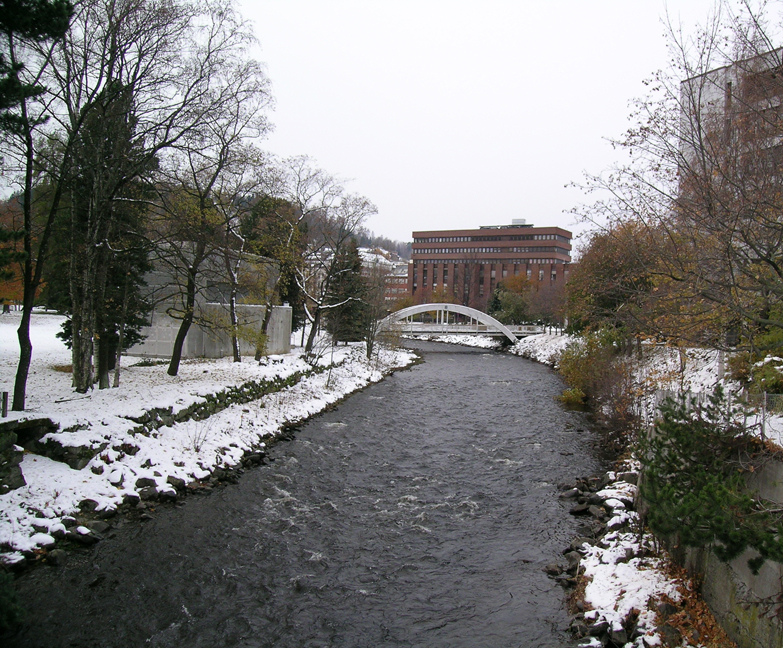
- View of the Hunnselva in Gjøvik

Location
- Country: Norway
- County: Innlandet
- Municipalities: Hurdal Municipality; Vestre Toten Municipality; Gjøvik Municipality

Physical characteristics
- Source: Syslemyr wetlands
  - location: Hurdal Municipality
  - coordinates: 60.48900°N 10.70252°E
  - elevation: 559 metres (1,834 ft)
- Mouth: Lake Mjøsa
  - location: Gjøvik, Gjøvik Municipality
  - coordinates: 60.7951124°N 10.701456°E
  - elevation: 123 metres (404 ft)
- Length: 50.3 km (31.3 mi)
- Basin size: 373.11 km^{2} (144.06 sq mi)
- Discharge
  - average: 4.94 m^{3}/s (174 cu ft/s)

Basin features
- Waterbodies: Einavatnet

Hunnselva is a river in Innlandet and Akershus counties in Norway. The 50.2-kilometre (31.2 mi) long river is located mostly in Innlandet county, but the headwaters are actually just over the border in Akershus county. The river generally flows north and it runs through the large lake Einavatnet as it passes through Hurdal Municipality, Vestre Toten Municipality, and Gjøvik Municipality.

The mouth of the river is in the town of Gjøvik where it empties into the large lake Mjøsa. The main part of the river is about 23-kilometre (14 mi) long and it runs from the Einavatnet lake to the town of Gjøvik. Along the course, the river passes through the villages of Eina, Reinsvoll, Raufoss, and Hunndalen. At the town of Gjøvik, the river divides the town with the Nordbyen neighborhood on the north side and the Sørbyen neighborhood to the south. Hunnselva gets its water from bogs and small forest ponds in the west and calcareous streams on the east, meaning the water is rich with nutrients. Its watershed extends from Lynga in the south to Gjøvik and Vardal in the north.

Hunnselva is affected by runoff from the urban infrastructure and sewage in Gjøvik and at one time the river was considered "one of Northern Europe's most polluted rivers." This greatly affected the level of pollution in Lake Mjøsa and by the end of the 19th century, the wildlife had been decimated. Thanks to conservation efforts, however, it has since been restored. The river is now home to trout, perch, pike, whitefish, rudd, and minnows. There is a fly fishing zone along the river where one can do catch and release fishing during the legal fishing season.

== Name ==
Historically, the river was known as the Hunn (Old English: Húð) which means "hunter", likely because the river was a good fishing river. The nearby villages of Hunn and Hunndalen in Gjøvik Municipality are both named after this river.

== See also ==
- List of rivers in Norway
