= Reinsvoll =

Village in Vestre Toten Municipality, Norway

- Village
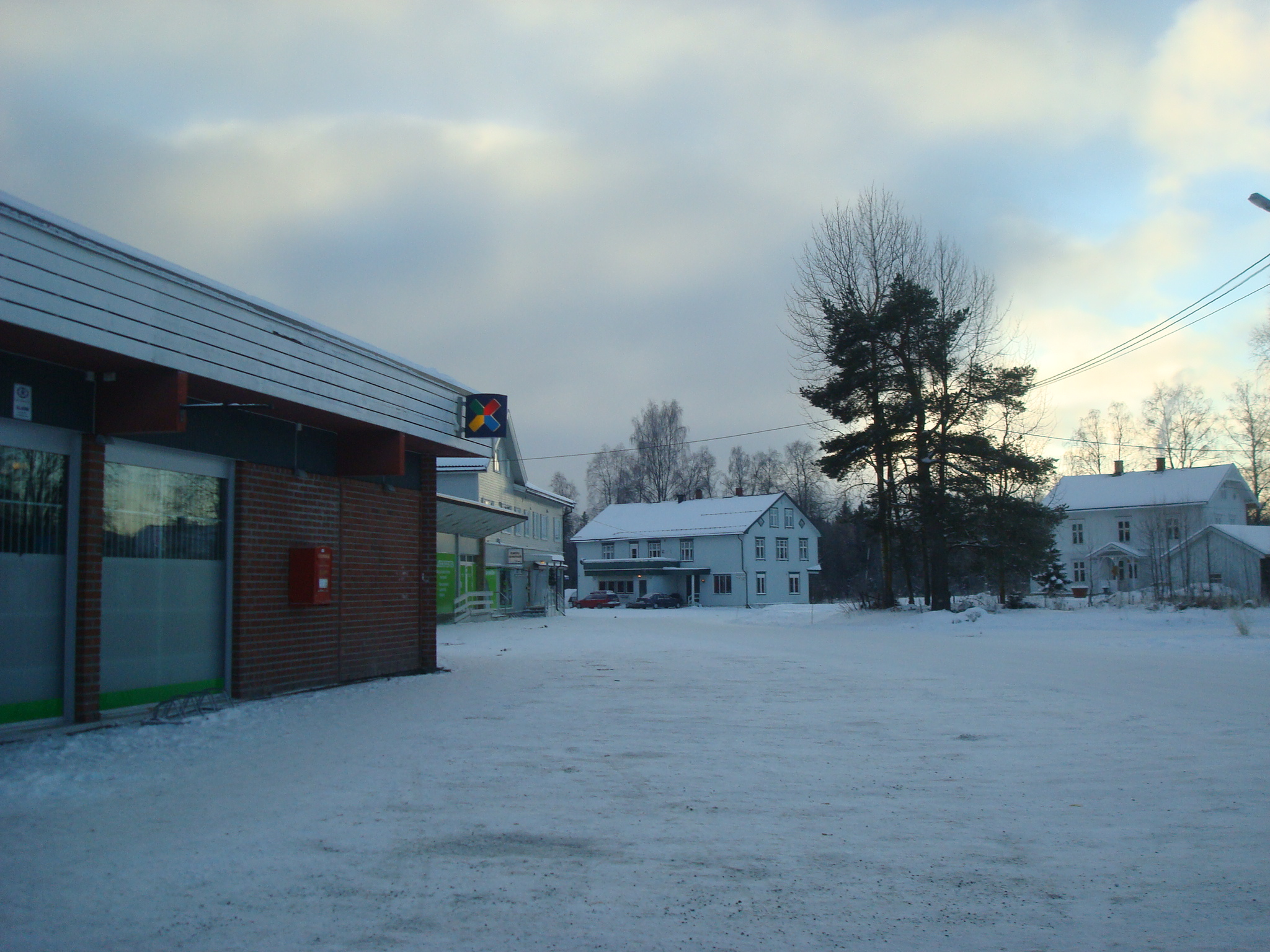
- View of the village
- Interactive map of Reinsvoll
- Location within Innlandet Location within Norway
- Coordinates: 60.67977°N 10.62175°E
- Country: Norway
- Region: Eastern Norway
- County: Innlandet
- District: Toten
- Municipality: Vestre Toten Municipality

Area
  - Total: 1.2 km^{2} (0.46 sq mi)
- Elevation: 355 m (1,165 ft)

Population (2024)
  - Total: 1,083
  - Density: 903/km^{2} (2,340/sq mi)
- Time zone: UTC+01:00 (CET)
  - Summer (DST): UTC+02:00 (CEST)
- Post Code: 2840 Reinsvoll

Reinsvoll is a village in Vestre Toten Municipality in Innlandet county, Norway. The village is located along the Norwegian National Road 4 between the village of Eina and the town of Raufoss. Reinsvoll has a train station that is located along the Gjøvik Line. The village has a football stadium, a pub, a barber, a lower secondary school, a primary school, a kindergarten, a grocery store, a fuel station, a psychiatric hospital, and run-down mill.

The 1.2-square-kilometre (300-acre) village has a population (2024) of 1,083 and a population density of 903 inhabitants per square kilometre (2,340/sq mi).

== History ==
Reinsvoll is first mentioned in existing historical records in 1616. By the early 17th century, there were farmers and laborers working in the village area. The original reason for the dense settlement at Reinsvoll was the Hunnselva river which could be exploited for the mill that was built along the river around the year 1800. The opening of the Gjøvikbanen and Skreiabanen railway lines in 1902 brought major changes. The workers who came to build the train line settled in Reinsvoll or stayed in one of the hotels that were there.
