= Nicolai Christian Mustad =

Norwegian factory owner

- Born: 26 December 1878
- Died: 13 October 1970 (aged 91)
- Occupation: Factory owner
- Father: Hans Mustad
- Awards: Order of St. Olav (1956)

Nicolai Christian Mustad (26 December 1878 – 13 October 1970) was a Norwegian factory owner. He was the son of Hans Mustad, and was co-owner of the company O. Mustad & Søn from 1905–1959. He was decorated Knight, First Class of the Order of St. Olav in 1956.

In 1908, Mustad bought a Vincent van Gogh painting on the advice of Norwegian art historian and conservator Jens Thiis, but soon consigned it to an attic when either the French ambassador to Sweden or Auguste Pellerin, the Norwegian consul in Paris, suggested it was a fake or wrongly attributed. The painting languished there until Mustad's death in 1970, when it was sold to another collector. Two failed attempts were made to attribute it as a van Gogh, but it was finally identified as Sunset at Montmajour, painted by van Gogh in 1888.
