= Ole Hovelsen Mustad =

Norwegian politician

Ole Hovelsen Mustad (12 March 1810 – 24 February 1884) was a Norwegian businessperson and politician. He was instrumental in shaping the company O. Mustad & Søn, and served one term in the Norwegian Parliament.

== Biography ==
He was born in Vardal as the son of Kari Tollefsdatter Bjørnstad (1782–1858) and her second husband Haavel Eriksen Kaas (1784–1849).

In 1843 he took over the company Brusveen Spiger- og Staaltraadfabrikk, founded by his father-in-law Hans Schikkelstad in 1832. It was located along the river Hunnselva in Vardal Municipality. Upon the takeover, Ole Mustad changed the name of the company to O. Mustad. He gradually expanded from wire and nail production to running a foundry and a sawmill. In 1874 his son Hans Mustad became co-owner, and the company name was changed to O. Mustad & Søn. The nail production was moved to Kristiania in 1876; instead the factory at Vardal started specializing in fish hook production. The company eventually became the world's largest producer of fish hooks.

Like his father-in-law, Ole Hovelsen Mustad was involved in politics. He was elected to the Norwegian Parliament in 1854, representing the constituency of Christians Amt. He only served one term. Ole Mustad was also the local police sergeant (lensmann) in Vardal Municipality from 1834 to 1857.

He died in 1884, only years before the company started expanding abroad. The company was eventually passed on to the five sons of Hans Mustad (1837–1918) who had been co-owners since 1905. Another of Ole Mustad's sons, Kristian Mauritz Mustad (1848–1913), became involved in national politics and worked as a jurist; so did his son Sigbjørn Mustad (1897–1970).
