= Sunset at Montmajour =

Painting by Vincent van Gogh

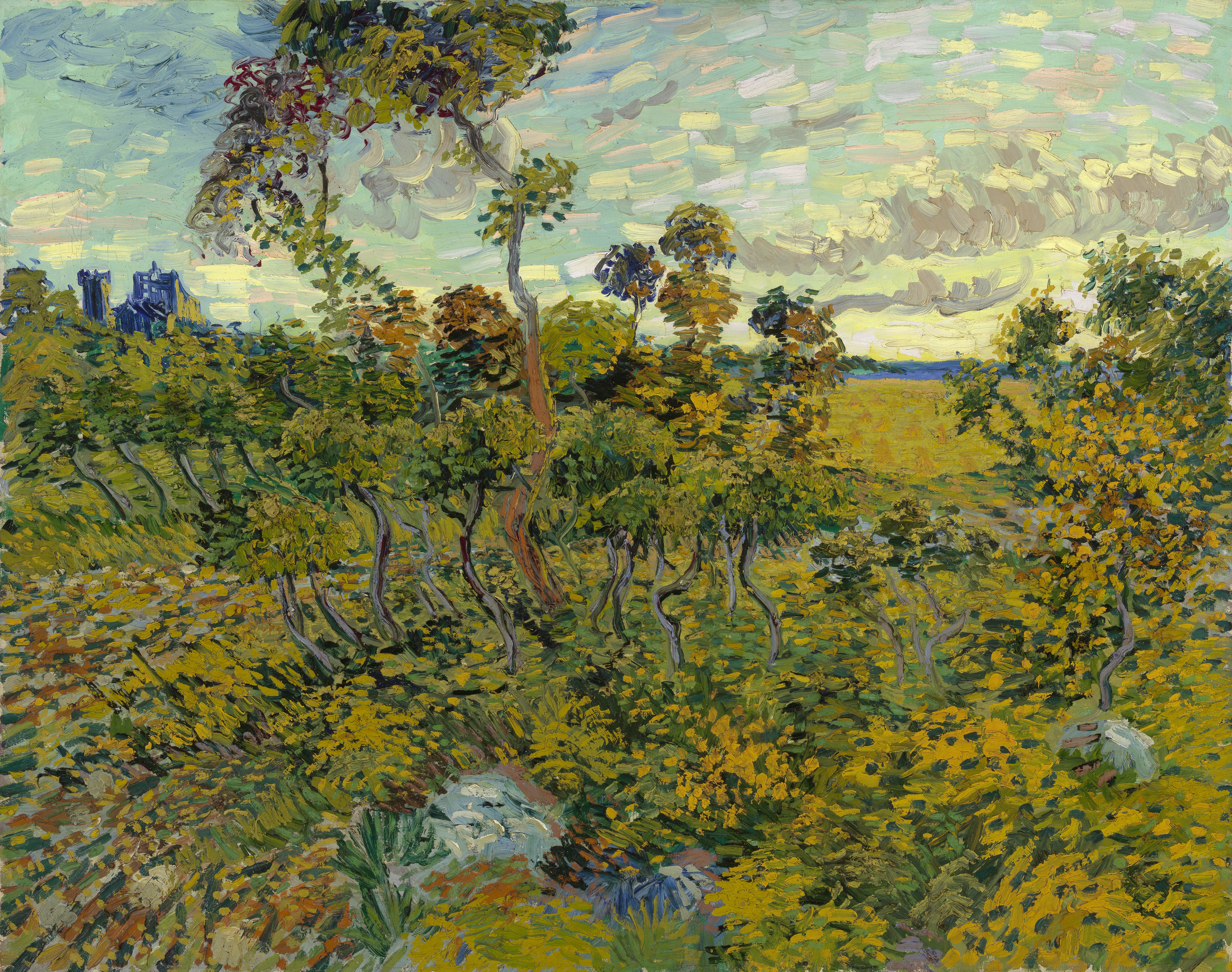
- Artist: Vincent van Gogh
- Year: 1888
- Medium: Oil on canvas
- Dimensions: 73.3 cm × 93.3 cm (28.9 in × 36.7 in)

Sunset at Montmajour is a landscape in oils painted by the Dutch artist Vincent van Gogh on 4 July 1888. It was painted while the artist was at Arles, France and depicts a landscape of garrigue with the ruins of Montmajour Abbey in the background. The painting is 73.3 cm × 93.3 cm (28.9 in × 36.7 in). For over 100 years, it was in a Norwegian industrialist's private collection and wrongly assumed to be fake, before being re-examined, authenticated and sold to its current private owner. The painting was temporarily on display from 24 September 2013 until 12 January 2014 as part of an exhibition at the Van Gogh Museum in Amsterdam.

Its authenticity was questioned several times before it was confirmed as a genuine van Gogh work in 2013. It is the first full-sized painting by Van Gogh to be newly confirmed since 1928.

== History ==
The painting was inventoried among Theo van Gogh's collection of his brother's works in 1890. It was sold in 1901 by his widow, Johanna van Gogh-Bonger, to a Paris art dealer. In 1908, the art dealer sold it to Christian Nicolai Mustad, a Norwegian industrialist who believed it to be the work of van Gogh and displayed the painting at his home. According to Mustad's family, the French ambassador to Sweden, while a guest at Mustad's home, advised that it probably was not by van Gogh. At that time Mustad took it down from display. The painting remained stored in his attic until Mustad's death, when it reappeared as part of his estate.

== Authentication ==
External videos
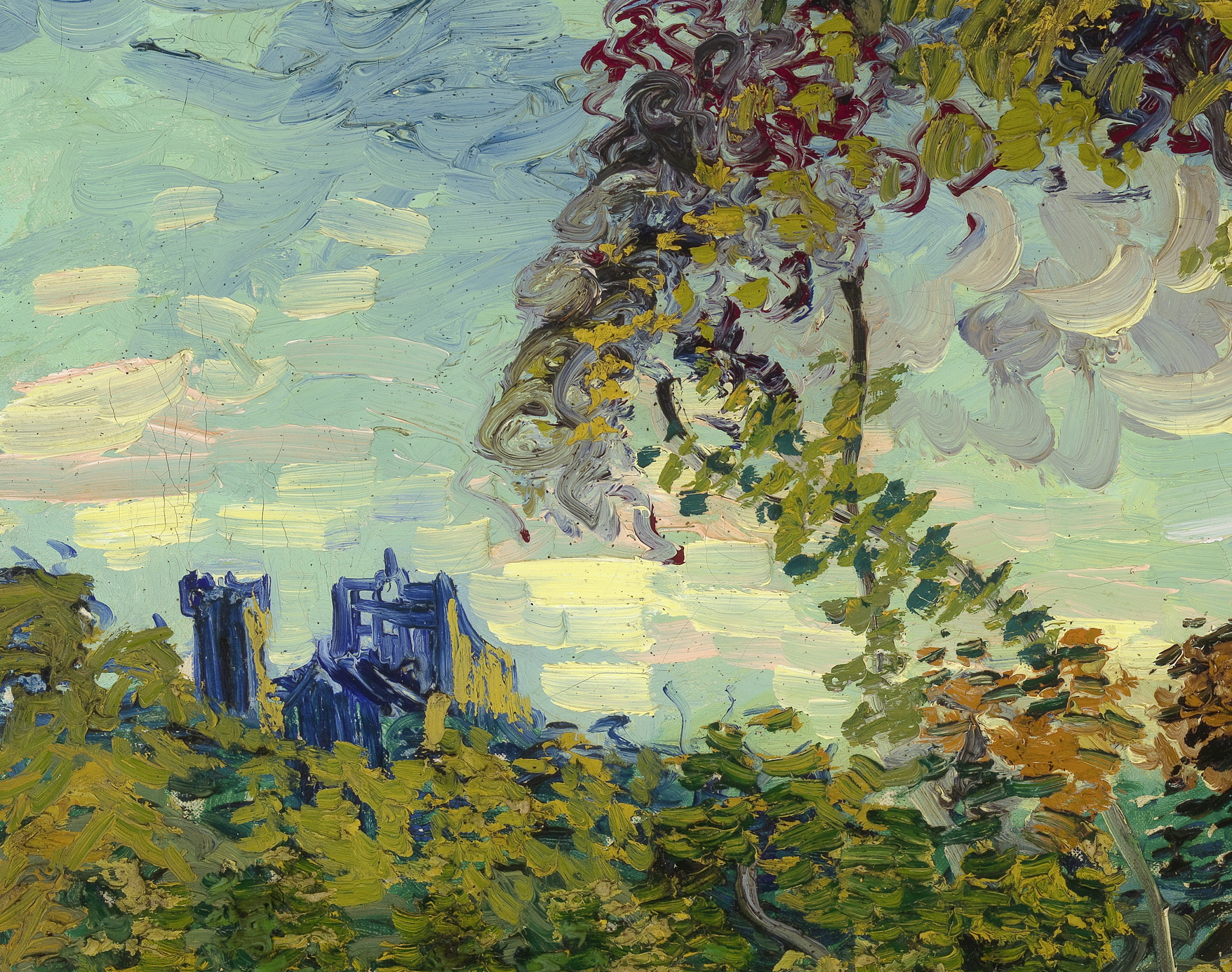
- A new Van Gogh discovery: Sunset at Montmajour (in Dutch), Van Gogh Museum

In the 1990s, the painting was shown to staff at the Van Gogh Museum, but it was dismissed as not the work of van Gogh because it was not signed. With the development of improved investigative techniques, however, in 2011 a two-year investigation was launched by the Van Gogh Museum to examine the possible authenticity of the painting. The painting was subjected to a detailed investigation of style and materials. It was discovered to have been painted in the same range of paints that appears in works by van Gogh at that period, which led to further research. Among the evidence that confirmed the painting's authenticity was a letter written by Vincent van Gogh to his brother Theo on 5 July 1888, describing a landscape that he had painted the previous day:

"Yesterday, at sunset, I was on a stony heath where very small, twisted oaks grow, in the background a ruin on the hill, and wheatfields in the valley. It was romantic, it couldn’t be more so, à la Monticelli, the sun was pouring its very yellow rays over the bushes and the ground, absolutely a shower of gold. And all the lines were beautiful, the whole scene had a charming nobility. You wouldn’t have been at all surprised to see knights and ladies suddenly appear, returning from hunting with hawks, or to hear the voice of an old Provençal troubadour. The fields seemed purple, the distances blue. And I brought back a study of it too, but it was well below what I’d wished to do."

On 9 September 2013, the Van Gogh Museum announced in a public unveiling of the painting, that the work had been confirmed as a painting by van Gogh.

== Reception ==
Martin Bailey praised Sunset at Montmajour as "a major addition to [van Gogh's] oeuvre."

== See also ==
- List of works by Vincent van Gogh
