= Hans Mustad =

Norwegian businessman

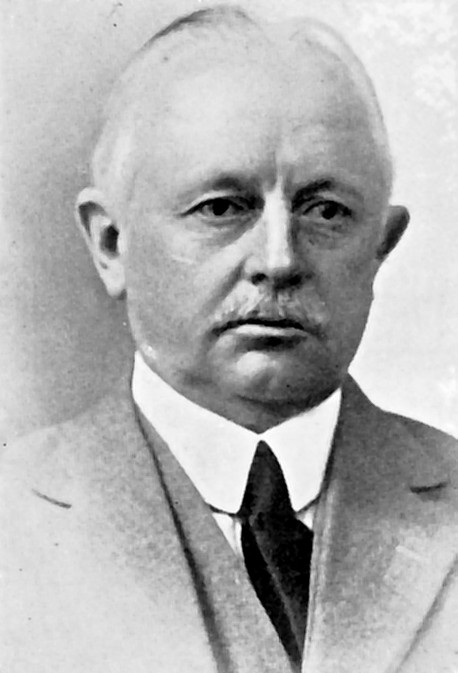
- Born: 26 January 1837; Vardal, Norway
- Died: 28 February 1918 (aged 81); Oslo, Norway

Hans Mustad (26 January 1837 – 27 February 1918) was a Norwegian businessperson. He was instrumental in shaping the company O. Mustad & Søn.

Mustad was born in Vardal Municipality as the son of Ole Hovelsen Mustad. He was a brother of Kristian Mauritz Mustad and uncle of Sigbjørn Mustad; both were jurists and politicians. Ole Hovelsen Mustad was a politician and businessperson who ran the company O. Mustad, inherited from Hans Mustad's grandfather Hans Schikkelstad in 1843. Hans Mustad married Marie Heyerdahl in 1865. She was a granddaughter of Hieronymus Heyerdahl,

Mustad started his working career in 1857, when hired in his father's company. They specialized in production of steel wire and nails, and also ran a foundry and a sawmill. In 1874, Hans Mustad became co-owner, and the company name was changed to O. Mustad & Søn, reflecting the new ownership structure. Under the involvement of Hans Mustad, the production was diversified. First, new products such as horse shoes, axe heads and fish hooks were introduced. In addition, the company expanded to other cities.

In 1875, the company bought property at Lilleaker in Kristiania (now Oslo), adjacent to the Lysaker river. With a nearby waterfall at Fåbrofossen, this location had a history of industry stretching back to the nail works owned by poet Christian Braunmann Tullin, which existed from 1749 to 1830. From 1874, the lot was vacant due to the explosion and subsequent move of the local nitroglycerine factory. In 1876, the production of nails and some other iron- and steelware was moved from Vardal to Lilleaker. In 1886 a factory was established in Finland. In 1889, the foundry was moved to Lilleaker, and the same year a margarine factory was established, entering a new branch of business. In addition, the factory at Vardal started production of fishing flies.

In the meantime, Ole Hovelsen Mustad had died (1884), leaving Hans Mustad as the single owner. His five sons became co-owners in 1905. These were Ole Mustad, Jr. (1870–1954), Hans Clarin Hovind Mustad (1871–1948), Halfdan Magnus Mustad (1874–1967), Wilhelm Martin Christie Mustad (1877–1961) and Nicolai Christian Mustad (1878–1970). They subsequently inherited the company upon Hans Mustad's death in 1918. By that time, O. Mustad & Søn was the largest industrial company in Norway, with 2,000 domestic employees as well as several factories abroad. The company eventually became the world's largest producer of fish hooks. Despite the ownership change, the name O. Mustad & Søn was kept. However, not long after its 1970 conversion to a limited company, it was split into different branches. 1977 saw the split into Mustad Industrier AS and Mustad International Group BV, whereas the former was split into Mustad AS, Mustad Industrier AS and Mustad Eiendom AS in 1997.
