= Einavatnet =

Lake in Innlandet, Norway

- Einafjorden; Eina (historic); Enevand (historic); Einavannet (unofficial)
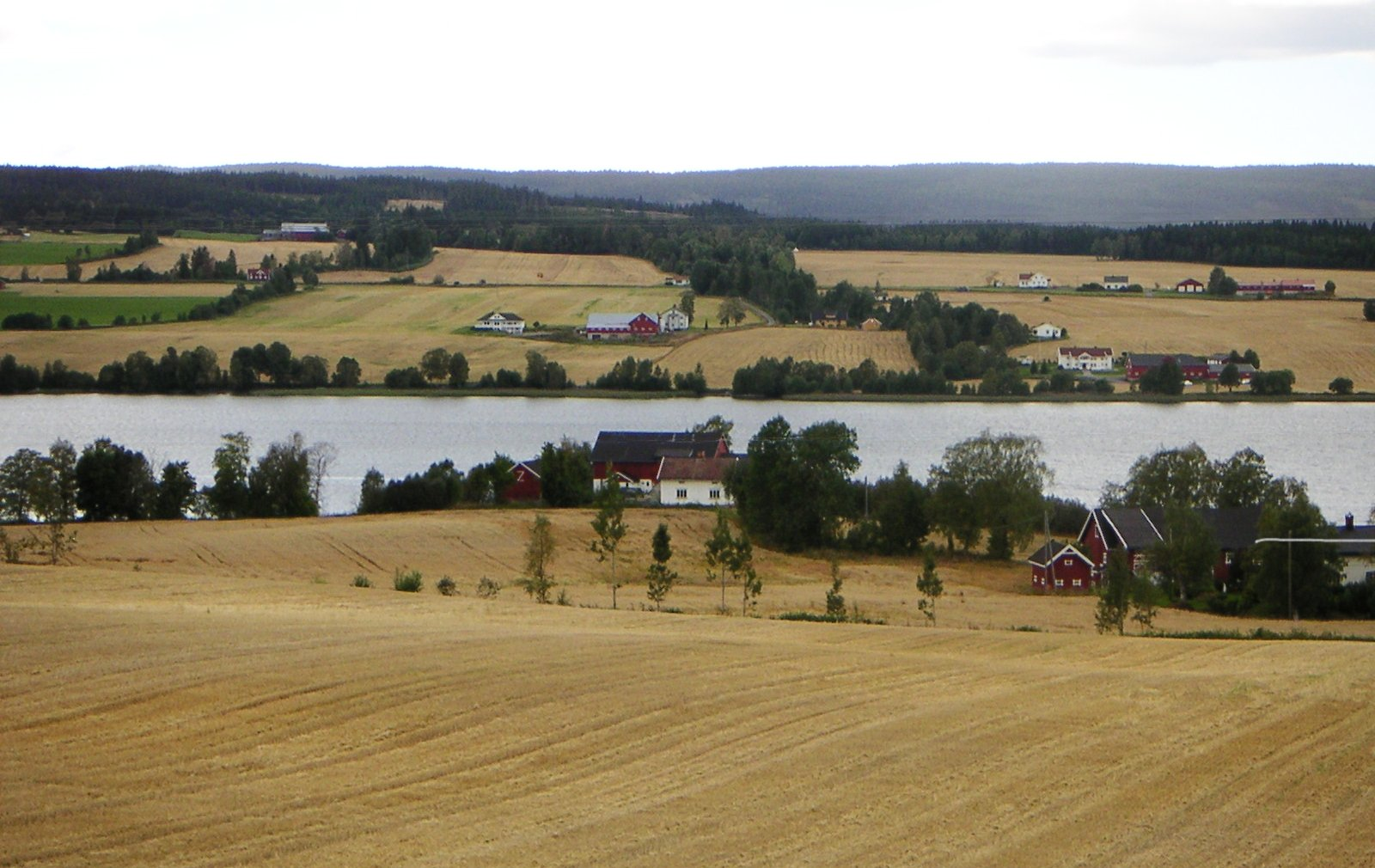
- View of the lake and surrounding farmland
- Interactive map of the lake
- Location: Vestre Toten Municipality, Innlandet
- Coordinates: 60°34′47″N 10°38′04″E
- Primary outflows: Hunnselva river
- Basin countries: Norway
- Max. length: 13 kilometres (8.1 mi)
- Max. width: 2.3 kilometres (1.4 mi)
- Surface area: 13.82 km^{2} (5.34 sq mi)
- Max. depth: 56 metres (184 ft)
- Shore length^{1}: 40 kilometres (25 mi)
- Surface elevation: 398 metres (1,306 ft)
- Settlements: Eina
- References: NVE
- ^{1} Shore length is not a well-defined measure.

Einavatnet is a lake which lies in Vestre Toten Municipality in Innlandet county, Norway. The 13.82-square-kilometre (5.34 sq mi) lake lies at an elevation of 398 metres (1,306 ft) above sea level. The lake lies in the southern portion of the municipality, about 12 kilometres (7.5 mi) south of the municipal centre, Raufoss. The village of Eina lies at the northern end of the lake. The Eina Church is located on the eastern shore of the lake. The Norwegian National Road 4 runs along the eastern shore of the lake. The river Hunnselva flows north out of the lake towards the town of Gjøvik where it drains into the large lake Mjøsa.

== Name ==
The Old Norse form of the name was probably just Eini. This name is derived from einir which means "juniper" (referring to the vegetation around the lake). The last element of the name is -vatnet which is the finite form of vatn which means "water" or "lake". Historically, the lake name only included the first element of the current name, and later the -vatnet suffix was added.

== See also ==
- List of lakes in Norway
