= Vardal Church =

Church in Innlandet, Norway

- Vardal kirke
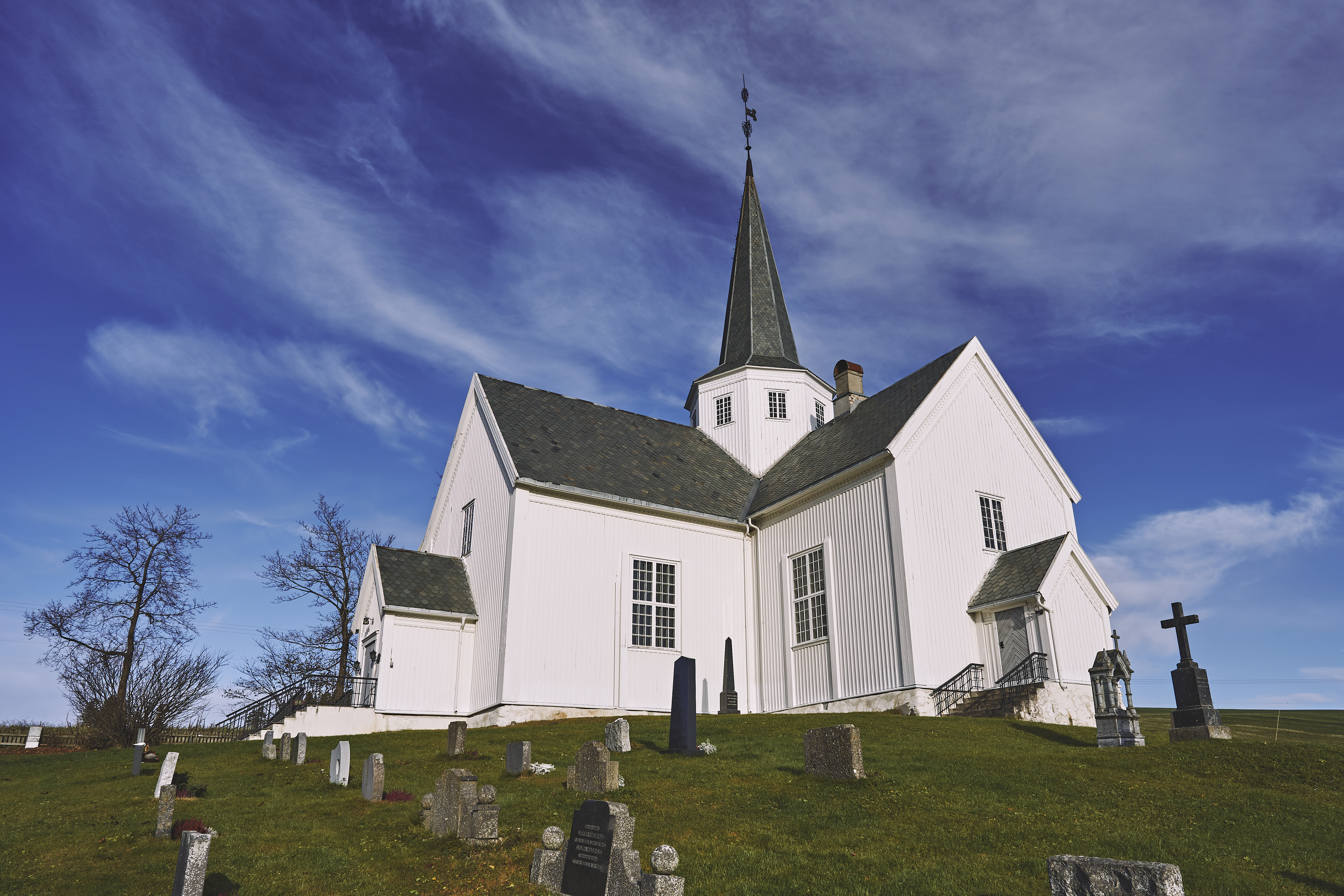
- View of the church
- Vardal Church
- 60°48′58″N 10°31′28″E
- Location: Gjøvik Municipality, Innlandet
- Country: Norway
- Denomination: Church of Norway
- Previous denomination: Catholic Church
- Churchmanship: Evangelical Lutheran

History
- Status: Parish church
- Founded: 12th century
- Consecrated: 30 November 1803

Architecture
- Functional status: Active
- Architectural type: Cruciform
- Completed: 1803 (223 years ago)

Specifications
- Capacity: 480
- Materials: Wood

Administration
- Diocese: Hamar bispedømme
- Deanery: Toten prosti
- Parish: Vardal
- Norwegian Cultural Heritage Site
- Type: Church
- Status: Automatically protected
- ID: 85769

Vardal Church (Norwegian: Vardal kirke) is a parish church of the Church of Norway in Gjøvik Municipality in Innlandet county, Norway. It is located in the village of Øverbygda. It is the church for the Vardal parish which is part of the Toten prosti (deanery) in the Diocese of Hamar. The white, wooden church was built in a cruciform design in 1803 using plans drawn up by an unknown architect. The church seats about 480 people.

== History ==
The first church in Vardal was a wooden stave church that was built in the late 12th century. This church was located on the Haug farm, about 40 metres (130 ft) to the south of the present church. Since it was located on the Haug farm, the church was sometimes referred to as the Haugskjerka. In 1576, Jens Nilssøn visited the church and oversaw the removal of idol images in the church after the Reformation. By the 1600s, the parish was getting too large for the size of the old church. In the 1720s, plans were made to tear down the old church and to build a new church on the same site. The new church was consecrated in 1727 by the Bishop Bartholomæus Deichman. Most of the furniture from the old church was transferred. Not much is known about this church building.

On 9 June 1801, there was a lightning storm which struck a nearby farm building on fire. The fire spread to the church stables and the church itself. The church was destroyed by the fire. Soon afterwards, planning for a new church began. The new church was built about 40 metres (130 ft) north of the old church site, just up the hill. The new wooden building was built with a cruciform design. Historians speculate that the architect was Amund Nilsen Gloppe based on the design and style of the building, but this is not confirmed. Construction took place in 1802–1803. The new church held its first service on 18 September 1803 and it was formally consecrated on 30 November 1803. In 1811, the exterior of the building was clad with wooden siding and painted red. Later the building was changed to a white exterior.

In 1814, this church served as an election church (Norwegian: valgkirke). Together with more than 300 other parish churches across Norway, it was a polling station for elections to the 1814 Norwegian Constituent Assembly which wrote the Constitution of Norway. This was Norway's first national elections. Each church parish was a constituency that elected an electoral college for each county, who later convened to elect the representatives for the assembly at Eidsvoll Manor later that year.

== Media gallery ==
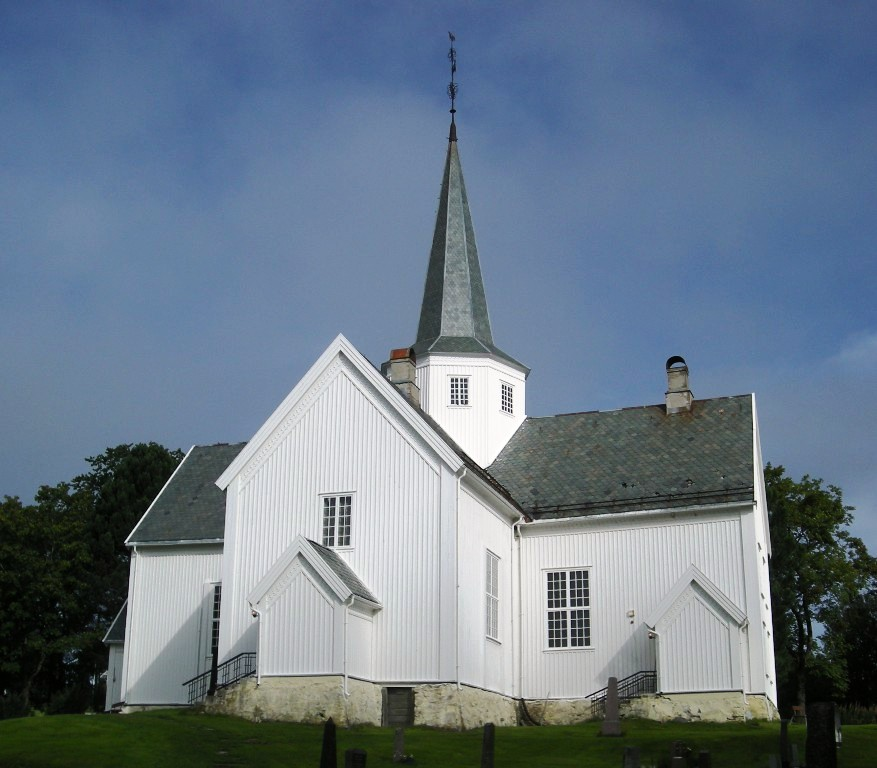

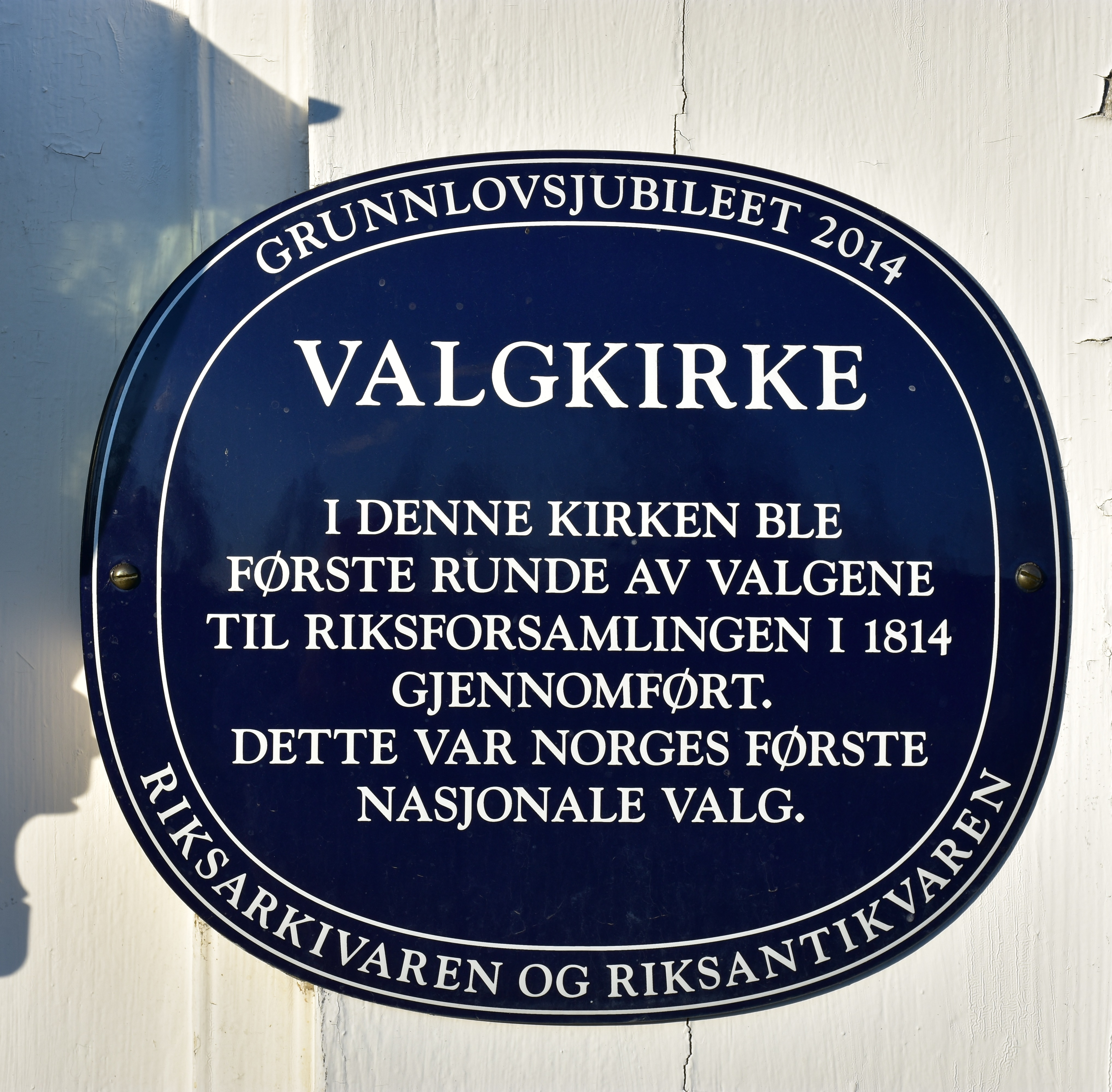

== See also ==
- List of churches in Hamar
