= Auguste Pellerin =

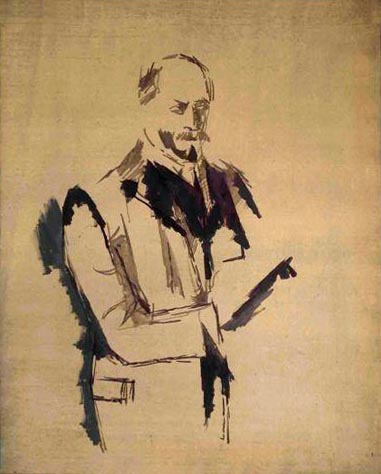
Paul Cézanne: Portrait of Auguste Pellerin, c. 1899

Auguste Pellerin (20 February 1853, Paris - 18 October 1929, Neuilly-sur-Seine) was a French entrepreneur and art collector. He was one of the most important collectors of the works of Édouard Manet and Paul Cézanne at the beginning of the 20th century.

== Life ==
Auguste Pellerin attained his fortune through margarine manufacturing. His successful enterprise included factories in France, England, Germany, Denmark, Sweden, and Norway. From 1906 until his death in 1929 he also acted as Norwegian General Consul in Paris.

At first, Pellerin collected craft objects such as porcelain, faience, and glass. He soon began to collect works by established painters such as Antoine Vollon und Jean Jacques Henner. Paintings by Jean-Baptiste-Camille Corot and the Impressionists followed. At this point he focused on Édouard Manet, buying many major works by that artist. In 1898 he acquired his first Cézanne from Ambroise Vollard. Over the years he accumulated a notable collection of more than 90 works by these artists. Pellerin became personally acquainted with some of these artists, including Cézanne, who sketched his portrait in 1899. Two further portraits were painted by Henri Matisse around 1916-17.

On 2 February 1910, 35 of Pellerin's Manets were sold for 1,000,000 francs to a consortium of art dealers that included Bernheim-Jeune, Durand-Ruel, and Paul Cassirer, a move that stirred controversy. Many of these paintings, which through Heinrich Thannhauser were exhibited in the Moderne Galerie in Munich, were later sold to German collectors and eventually ended up in German museums. Although Pellerin sold more of his collection during his lifetime, his son Jean-Victor Pellerin and his daughter Mme René Lecomte (née Pellerin) still inherited a substantial number of paintings, drawings, and sculptures. In 1982, his heirs gave 14 of the most important Cézanne paintings in the remaining collection to French state museums.

== Selection of works from the Pellerin collection ==
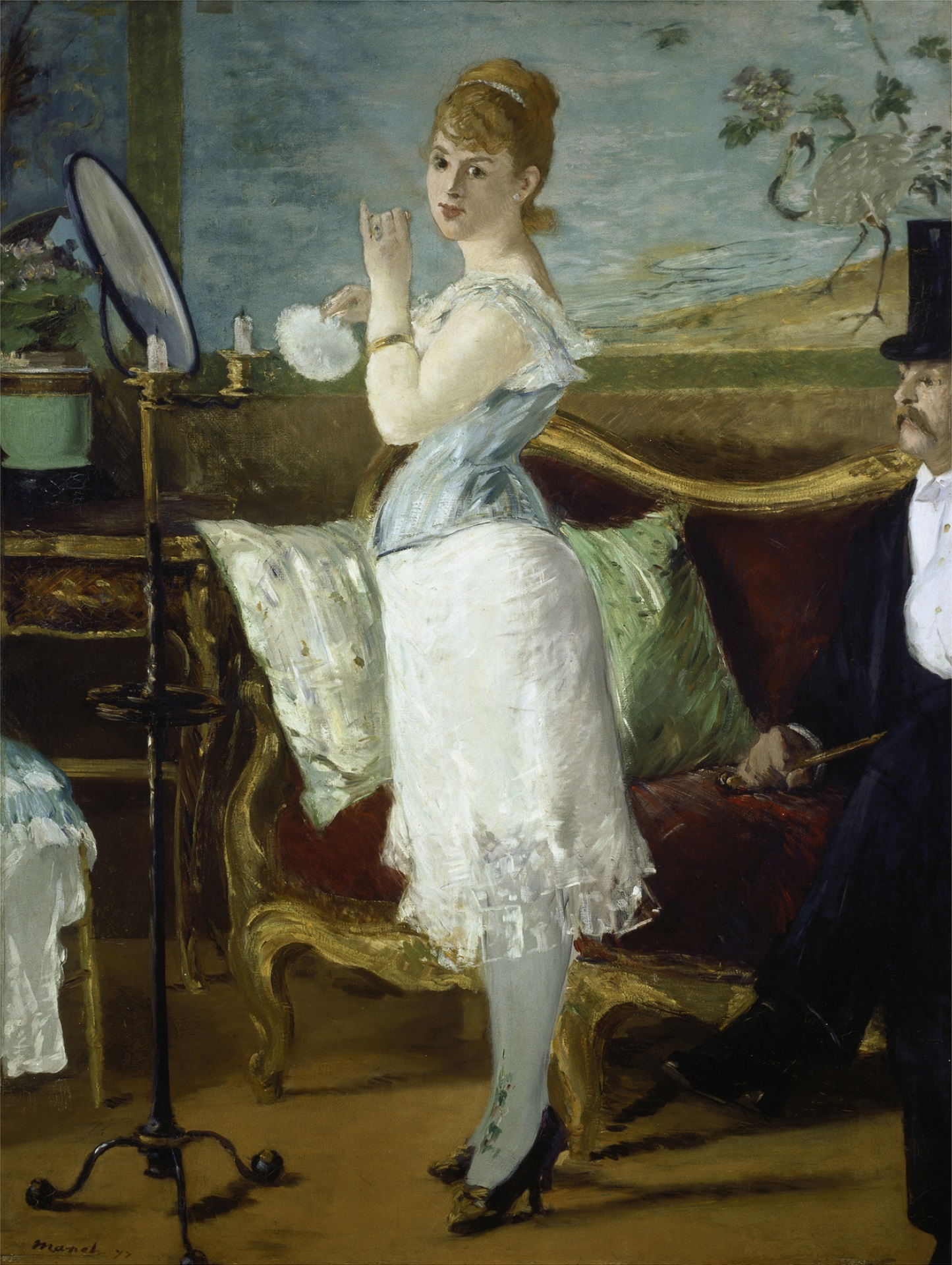
Édouard Manet:
Nana,
Hamburger Kunsthalle

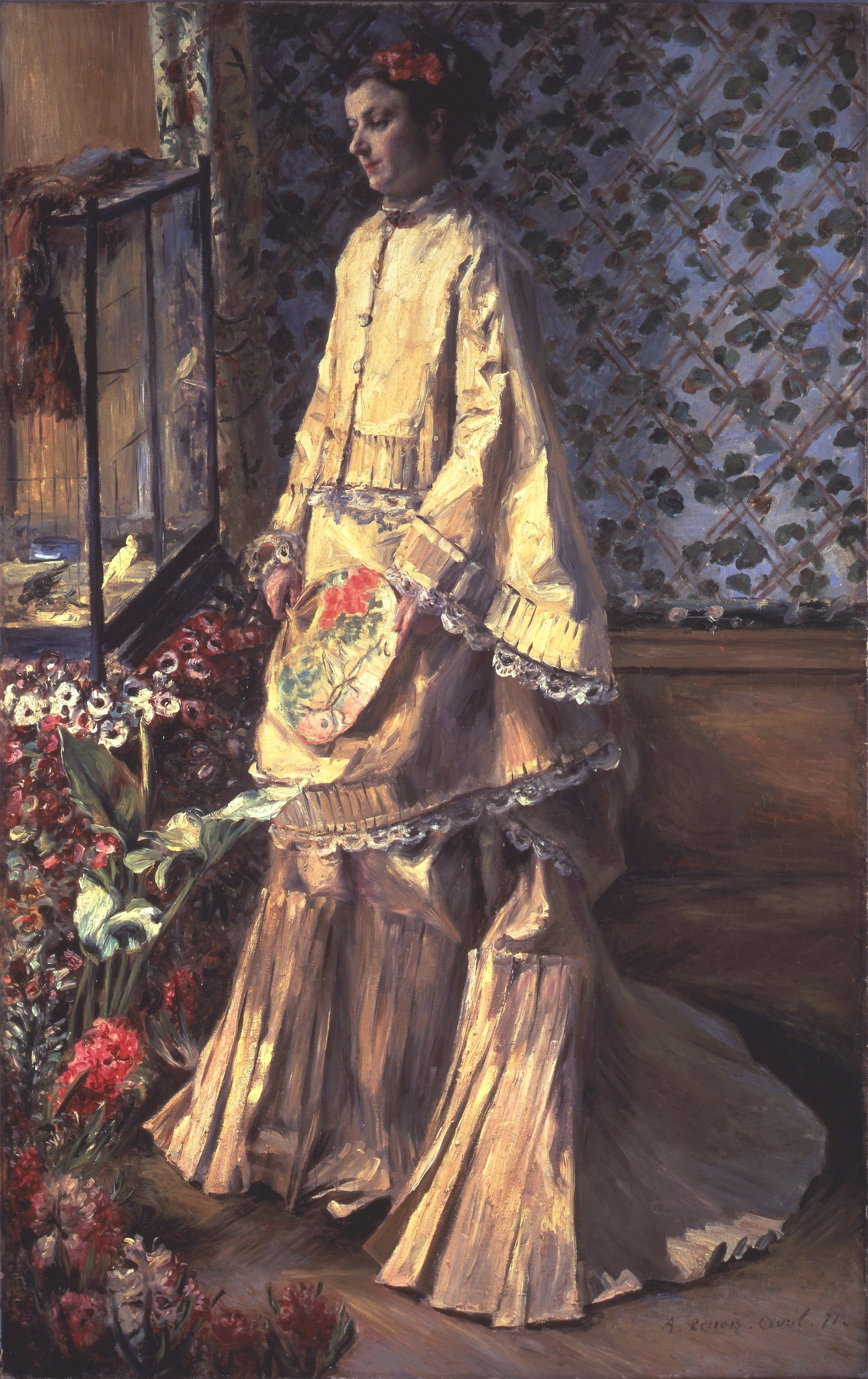
Pierre-Auguste Renoir:
Portrait de Rapha Maître II,
private collection

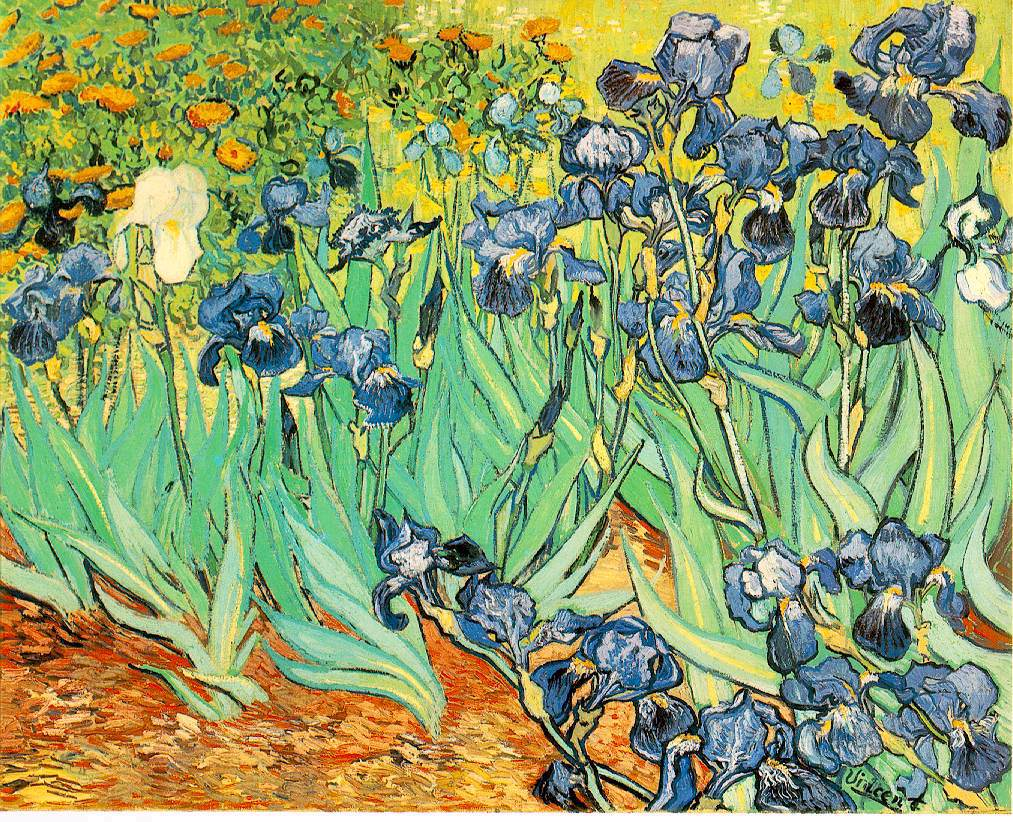
Vincent van Gogh:
Irises,
J. Paul Getty Museum, Los Angeles

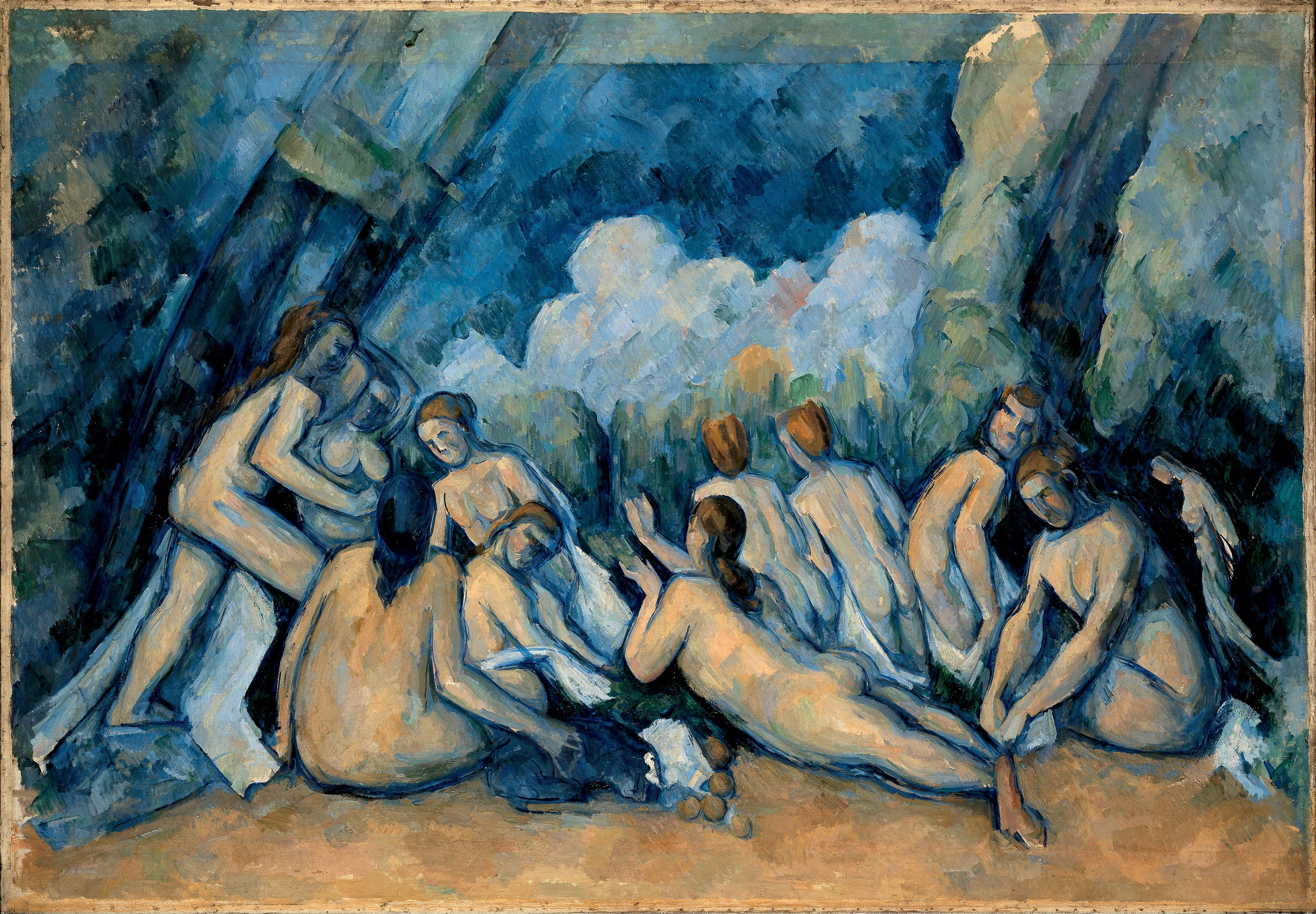
Paul Cézanne:
Bathers,
National Gallery, London
