= Kristian Mauritz Mustad =

Norwegian politician

Kristian Mauritz Mustad (28 February 1848 – 26 December 1913) was a Norwegian politician for the Liberal Party.

He was elected to the Norwegian Parliament in 1883, representing the constituency of Kristians Amt. He was re-elected in 1886, 1889 and 1892.

He worked as an attorney. His son Sigbjørn Mustad followed in his footsteps, both as a jurist and as a member of Parliament. Kristian Mauritz Mustad was the son of Ole Hovelsen Mustad and brother of Hans Mustad, and grandson of Hans Hansen Schikkelstad.
