= Sigbjørn Mustad =

Norwegian lawyer and politician

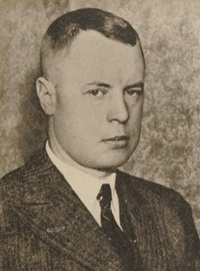
- Born: 19 April 1897; Vardal, Norway
- Died: 30 October 1970 (aged 73)
- Occupations: Lawyer, judge and politician
- Father: Kristian Mauritz Mustad

Sigbjørn Mustad (19 April 1897 – 30 October 1970) was a Norwegian lawyer and politician for the Conservative Party.

Mustad was born in Vardal Municipality as a son of Kristian Mauritz Mustad (1848–1913) and Maren Haugsrud (1860–1917). He was elected to the Storting during the period 1937–1945. During the German occupation of Norway he was assigned with the Norwegian governmental administration in London. From 1946, he was appointed presiding judge in Agder Court of Appeal. He chaired the board of A/S Union from 1947 to 1963. He published the book Utenlands i krigsårene in 1958, and Union i 17 år.
