= Vardal Municipality =

Former municipality in Oppland, Norway

Vardal Municipality Vardal herred
- Former municipality
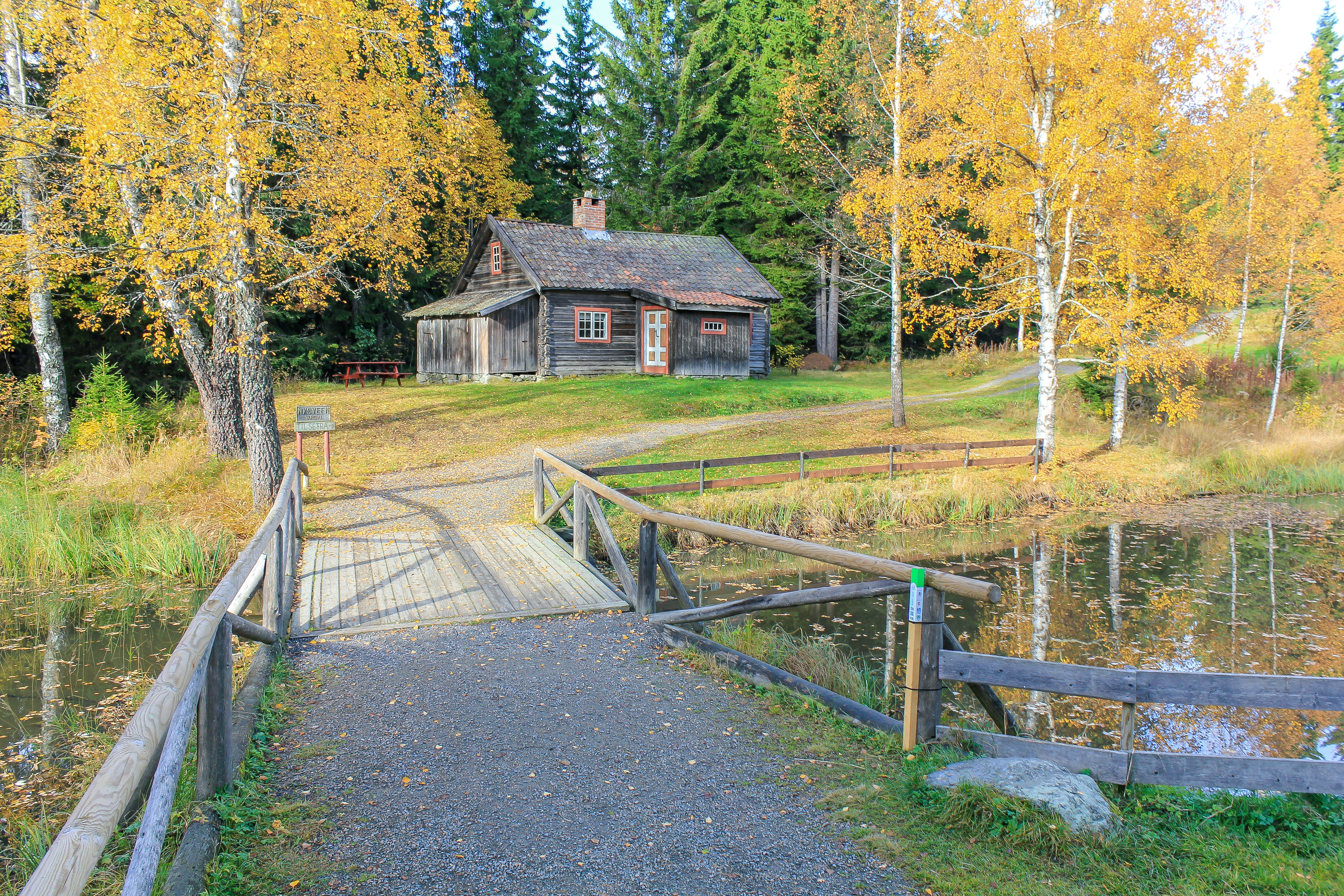
- Old farmhouse in Vardal

- Oppland within Norway

- Vardal within Oppland
- Coordinates: 60°48′58″N 10°31′28″E
- Country: Norway
- County: Oppland
- District: Vestoppland
- Established: 1 Jan 1838
  - Created as: Formannskapsdistrikt
- Disestablished: 1 Jan 1964
  - Succeeded by: Vestre Toten Municipality and Gjøvik Municipality
- Administrative centre: Vardal

Government
  - Mayor (1960-1963): Alf R. Iversen (Ap)

Area (upon dissolution)
  - Total: 272.9 km^{2} (105.4 sq mi)
  - Rank: #301 in Norway
- Highest elevation: 708 m (2,323 ft)

Population (1963)
  - Total: 9,584
  - Rank: #76 in Norway
  - Density: 35.1/km^{2} (91/sq mi)
  - Change (10 years): ▲ +3.3%
- Demonym(s): Vardøl; Vardøling

Official language
  - Norwegian form: Neutral
- Time zone: UTC+01:00 (CET)
  - Summer (DST): UTC+02:00 (CEST)
- ISO 3166 code: NO-0527

Vardal is a former municipality in the old Oppland county, Norway. The 273-square-kilometre (105 sq mi) municipality existed from 1838 until its dissolution in 1964. The area is now divided between Gjøvik Municipality and Vestre Toten Municipality in the traditional district of Vestoppland. The administrative centre was the village of Vardal where Vardal Church was located. Other villages in the municipality included Bybrua and Øverbygda.

Prior to its dissolution in 1964, the 272.9-square-kilometre (105.4 sq mi) municipality was the 301st largest by area out of the 689 municipalities in Norway. Vardal Municipality was the 76th most populous municipality in Norway with a population of about 9,584. The municipality's population density was 35.1 inhabitants per square kilometre (91/sq mi) and its population had increased by3.3 % over the previous 10-year period.

== General information ==
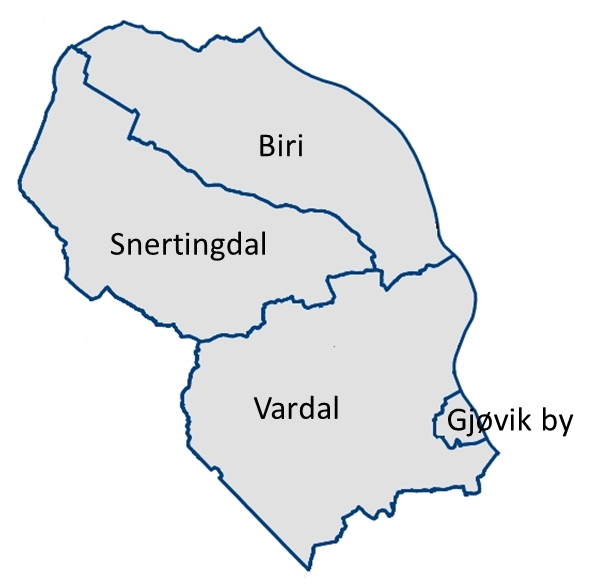
Map of the Vardal area before 1964

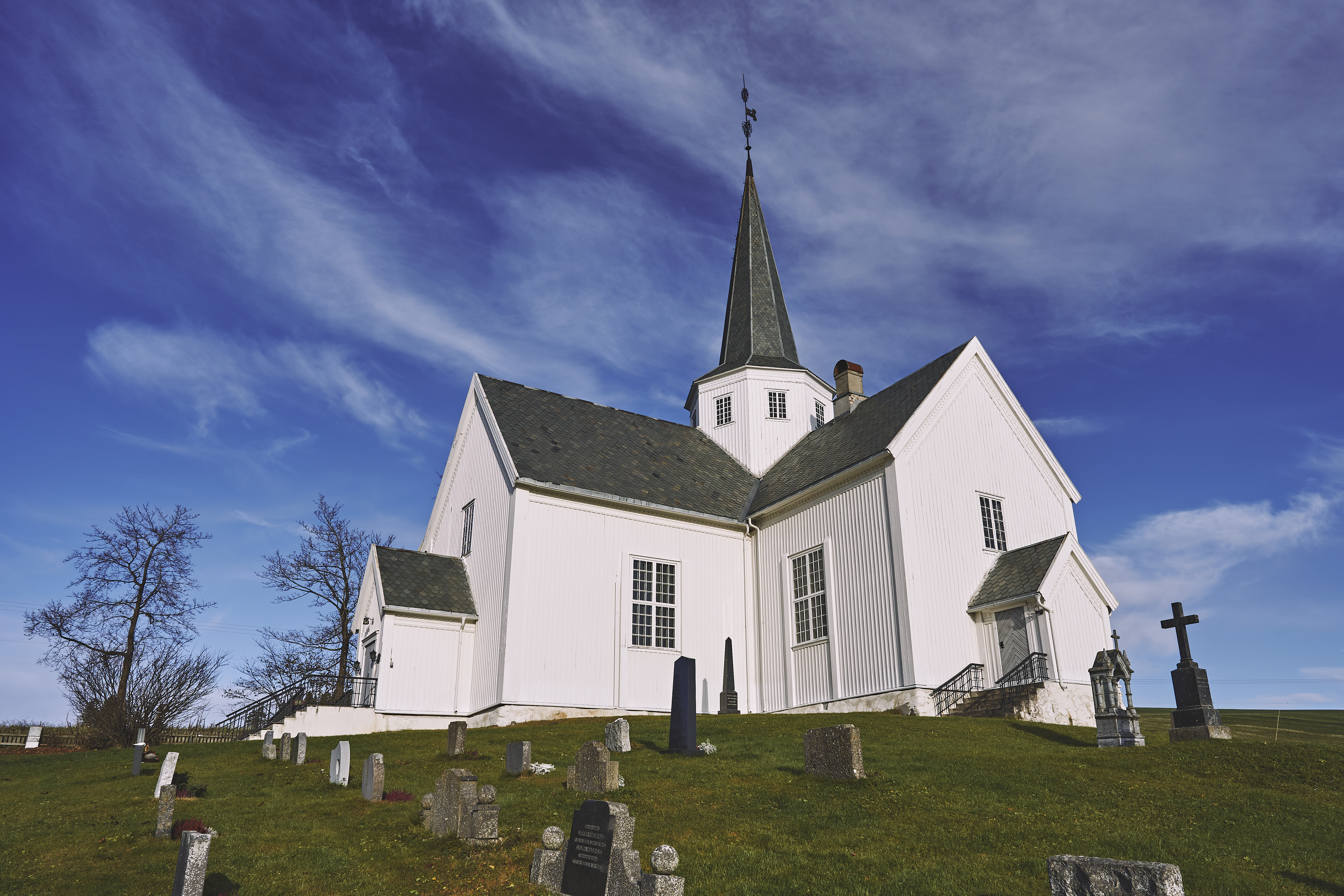
View of Vardal Church

The prestegjeld of Vardal was established as a municipality on 1 January 1838 (see formannskapsdistrikt law). According to the 1835 census the parish had a population of 2,921 shortly before it became a municipality. On 1 January 1861 the town of Gjøvik (population: 626) was separated from Vardal Municipality to constitute a separate town-municipality, leaving the rural Vardal Municipality with a population of 4,114. On 1 January 1896, the Østby and Aas farms from Østre Toten Municipality (population: 49) were transferred into Vardal Municipality. On 1 January 1900, an unpopulated area of Søndre Land Municipality was transferred to Vardal Municipality.

During the 20th century, the town of Gjøvik was growing and twice the town annexed parts of Vardal Municipality. On 1 July 1921, an area with 723 residents was taken from Vardal Municipality and added to the town of Gjøvik. Then again on 1 July 1955, another area (population: 1,372) was transferred from Vardal Municipality to Gjøvik Municipality.

During the 1960s, there were many municipal mergers across Norway due to the work of the Schei Committee. On 1 January 1964, Vardal Municipality was dissolved and its lands and people were transferred to neighboring municipalities:

- the Sørligrenda area (population: 87) was merged with Vestre Toten Municipality (population: 9,113), Eina Municipality (population: 1,591), and a small part of Gran Municipality (population: 12) to form a new, larger Vestre Toten Municipality.
- the rest of Vardal Municipality (population: 9,612) was merged with the town of Gjøvik (population: 8,251), Snertingdal Municipality (population: 2,471), and Biri Municipality (population: 3,274) to form a new, larger Gjøvik Municipality.

=== Name ===
The municipality is named after the Vardal valley (Old Norse: Vardalr) since the valley was located in the municipality. The first element is probably from the old name for a local river. the river name comes from the word ver which means "quiet" or "calm". The last element is dalr which means "valley" or "dale".

=== Churches ===
The Church of Norway had one parish (sokn) within Vardal Municipality. At the time of the municipal dissolution, it was part of the Vardal prestegjeld and the Toten prosti (deanery) in the Diocese of Hamar.

Churches in Vardal Municipality
Parish (sokn)	Church name	Location of the church	Year built
Vardal	Vardal Church	Øverbygda	1803

== Geography ==
Biri Municipality was located to the north, Ringsaker Municipality (in Hedmark county) was located to the northeast, Nes Municipality (in Hedmark county) was located to the east, Østre Toten Municipality was located to the southeast, Vestre Toten Municipality was located to the south, Søndre Land Municipality was located to the southwest, Fluberg Municipality was located to the west, and Snertingdal Municipality was located to the northwest. The highest point in the municipality was the 708-metre (2,323 ft) tall mountain Skybergtoppen, in the northwest part of the municipality.

== Government ==
While it existed, Vardal Municipality was responsible for primary education (through 10th grade), outpatient health services, senior citizen services, welfare and other social services, zoning, economic development, and municipal roads and utilities. The municipality was governed by a municipal council of directly elected representatives. The mayor was indirectly elected by a vote of the municipal council. The municipality was under the jurisdiction of the Eidsivating Court of Appeal.

=== Municipal council ===
The municipal council (Herredsstyre) of Vardal Municipality was made up of 29 representatives that were elected to four year terms. The tables below show the historical composition of the council by political party.

Vardal herredsstyre 1959–1963
Party name (in Norwegian)	Number of representatives
Labour Party (Arbeiderpartiet)	17
Communist Party (Kommunistiske Parti)	3
Christian Democratic Party (Kristelig Folkeparti)	1
Joint List(s) of Non-Socialist Parties (Borgerlige Felleslister)	7
Local List(s) (Lokale lister)	1
Total number of members:	29
Note: On 1 January 1964, Vardal Municipality was divided between Gjøvik Municipality and Vestre Toten Municipality.

Vardal herredsstyre 1955–1959
Party name (in Norwegian)	Number of representatives
Labour Party (Arbeiderpartiet)	18
Conservative Party (Høyre)	2
Communist Party (Kommunistiske Parti)	3
Christian Democratic Party (Kristelig Folkeparti)	1
Farmers' Party (Bondepartiet)	3
Liberal Party (Venstre)	2
Total number of members:	29

Vardal herredsstyre 1951–1955
Party name (in Norwegian)	Number of representatives
Labour Party (Arbeiderpartiet)	12
Conservative Party (Høyre)	1
Communist Party (Kommunistiske Parti)	2
Christian Democratic Party (Kristelig Folkeparti)	1
Farmers' Party (Bondepartiet)	2
Liberal Party (Venstre)	2
Total number of members:	20

Vardal herredsstyre 1947–1951
Party name (in Norwegian)	Number of representatives
Labour Party (Arbeiderpartiet)	11
Communist Party (Kommunistiske Parti)	3
Christian Democratic Party (Kristelig Folkeparti)	1
Farmers' Party (Bondepartiet)	2
Joint list of the Liberal Party (Venstre) and the Radical People's Party (Radikale Folkepartiet)	3
Total number of members:	20

Vardal herredsstyre 1945–1947
Party name (in Norwegian)	Number of representatives
Labour Party (Arbeiderpartiet)	11
Communist Party (Kommunistiske Parti)	3
Farmers' Party (Bondepartiet)	2
Joint list of the Liberal Party (Venstre) and the Radical People's Party (Radikale Folkepartiet)	4
Total number of members:	20

Vardal herredsstyre 1937–1941*
Party name (in Norwegian)	Number of representatives
Labour Party (Arbeiderpartiet)	16
Farmers' Party (Bondepartiet)	4
Total number of members:	20
Note: Due to the German occupation of Norway during World War II, no elections were held for new municipal councils until after the war ended in 1945.

=== Mayors ===
The mayor (Norwegian: ordfører) of Vardal Municipality was the political leader of the municipality and the chairperson of the municipal council. The following people have held this position:

- 1838–1839: Hans Skikkelstad
- 1840–1845: Hans Peter Borchgrevink
- 1845–1847: Henrik Christian Borchgrevink
- 1848–1849: Christian Braastad
- 1850–1865: Johan Braastad
- 1866–1869: Peder Mustad
- 1870–1881: Anders Jørgensen Veum
- 1882–1889: Nicolai Forseth
- 1890–1891: Peter Braastad
- 1892–1895: Andreas Kastad
- 1896–1898: Lars J. Aalstad
- 1899–1901: Andreas Kastad
- 1902–1910: Halvor Fosmark (AD)
- 1910–1922: Arne Fosnes (AD)
- 1922–1925: Kristian Nyjordet (Bp)
- 1926–1928: Ludvig Skjerven (RF)
- 1929–1937: Knut A. Jenseth (Ap)
- 1938–1940: Johannes Odnessveen (Ap)
- 1941–1943: Knut A. Jenseth (NS)
- 1943–1945: Kristian Fjeld (NS)
- 1945–1945: Johannes Odnessveen (Ap)
- 1946–1959: Andreas Nordland (Ap)
- 1959–1959: Harald Børresen (Ap)
- 1960–1963: Alf R. Iversen (Ap)

== See also ==
- List of former municipalities of Norway
