= Nordlia =

Village in Østre Toten Municipality, Norway

Nordlia Nordlien (unofficial)
- Village
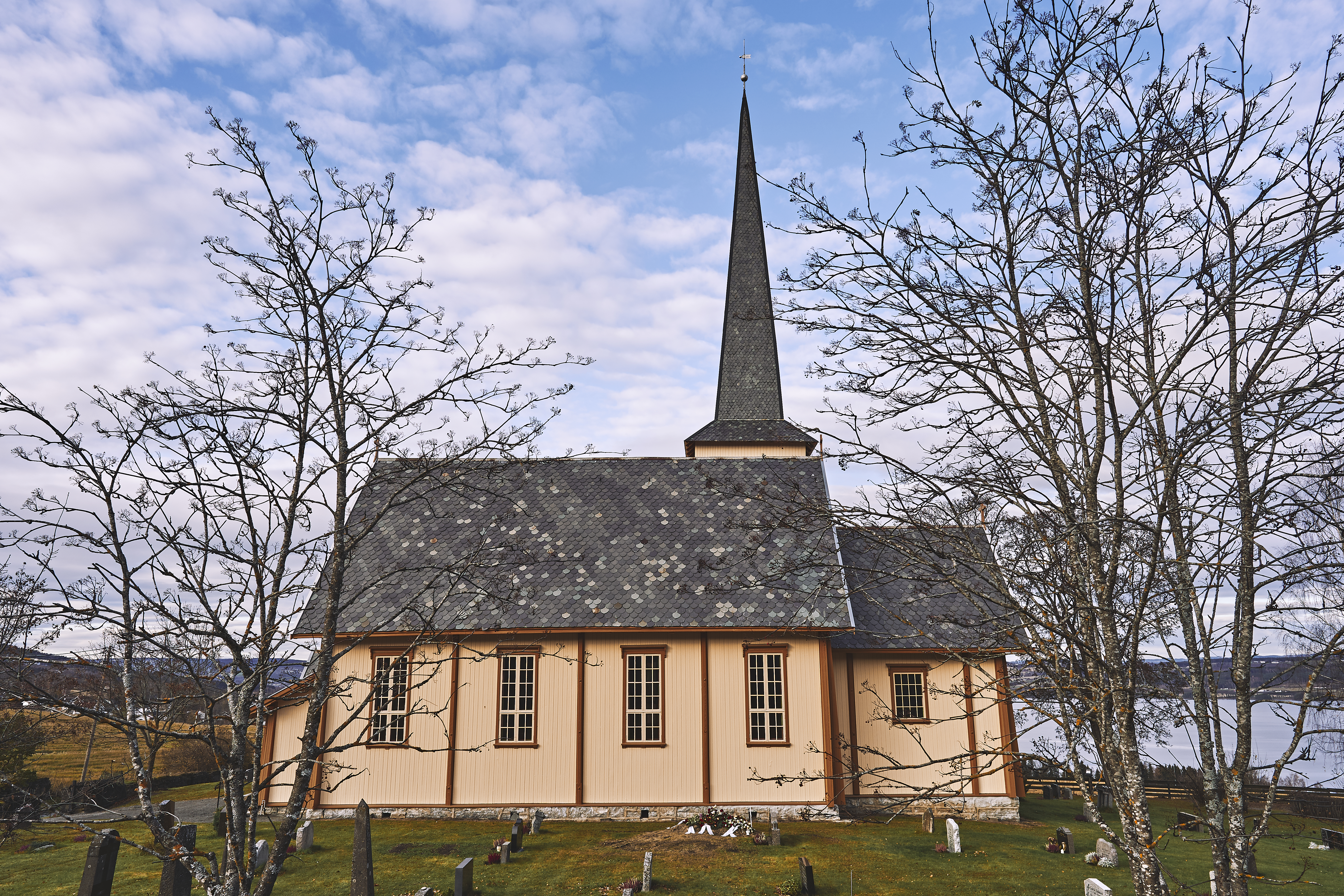
- View of the village church, Nordlien Church
- Interactive map of Nordlia
- Location within Innlandet Location within Norway
- Coordinates: 60.74171°N 10.76207°E
- Country: Norway
- Region: Eastern Norway
- County: Innlandet
- District: Toten
- Municipality: Østre Toten Municipality

Area
  - Total: 0.48 km^{2} (0.19 sq mi)
- Elevation: 252 m (827 ft)

Population (2024)
  - Total: 683
  - Density: 1,423/km^{2} (3,690/sq mi)
- Time zone: UTC+01:00 (CET)
  - Summer (DST): UTC+02:00 (CEST)
- Post Code: 2820 Nordre Toten

Nordlia is a village in Østre Toten Municipality in Innlandet county, Norway. The village is located on the shore of the lake Mjøsa, about 7 kilometres (4.3 mi) to the southeast of the town of Gjøvik, about 7 kilometres (4.3 mi) to the northwest of the village of Kapp, and about 9 kilometres (5.6 mi) north of the village of Lena. Nordlien Church is located in the village.

The 0.48-square-kilometre (120-acre) village has a population (2024) of 683 and a population density of 1,423 inhabitants per square kilometre (3,690/sq mi).
