= Nordlien Church =

Church in Innlandet, Norway

- Nordlien kirke
- Nordlia kirke
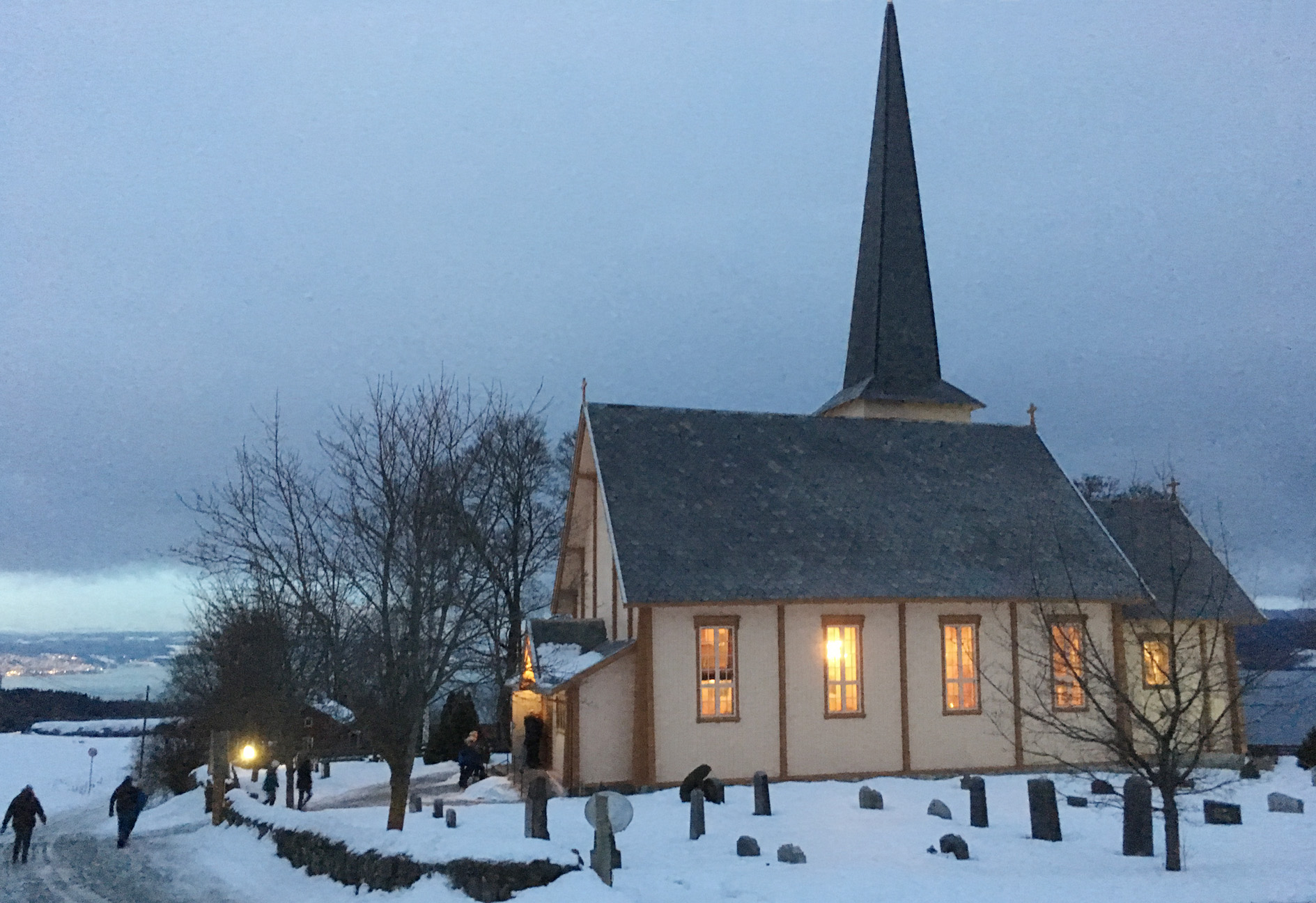
- View of the church
- Nordlien Church
- 60°44′36″N 10°46′12″E
- Location: Østre Toten, Innlandet
- Country: Norway
- Denomination: Church of Norway
- Churchmanship: Evangelical Lutheran

History
- Status: Parish church
- Founded: 1901
- Consecrated: 1901

Architecture
- Functional status: Active
- Architect: Johan Meyer
- Architectural type: Long church
- Completed: 1901 (125 years ago)

Specifications
- Capacity: 232
- Materials: Wood

Administration
- Diocese: Hamar bispedømme
- Deanery: Toten prosti
- Parish: Nordlien
- Norwegian Cultural Heritage Site
- Type: Church
- Status: Not protected
- ID: 85158

Nordlien Church or Nordlia Church (Norwegian: Nordlien kirke or Nordlia kirke) is a parish church of the Church of Norway in Østre Toten Municipality in Innlandet county, Norway. It is located in the village of Nordlia. It is the church for the Nordlien parish which is part of the Toten prosti (deanery) in the Diocese of Hamar. The white, wooden church was built in a long church design in 1901 using plans drawn up by the architect Johan Meyer. The church seats about 232 people.

== History ==
Planning for a new church at Nordlia began around the turn of the 20th century. Johan Meyer was hired to design the new wooden building. It is a long church with an asymmetrically placed tower on the northeast side of the nave. The nave is rectangular and the chancel is narrower than the nave. There is a church porch on the west end that is the same width as the nave. There is also a sacristy on the east side of the tower and north of the chancel. The building was originally constructed as an annex chapel when it was consecrated in 1901. More recently, it was upgraded in status to that of a parish church.

== Media gallery ==
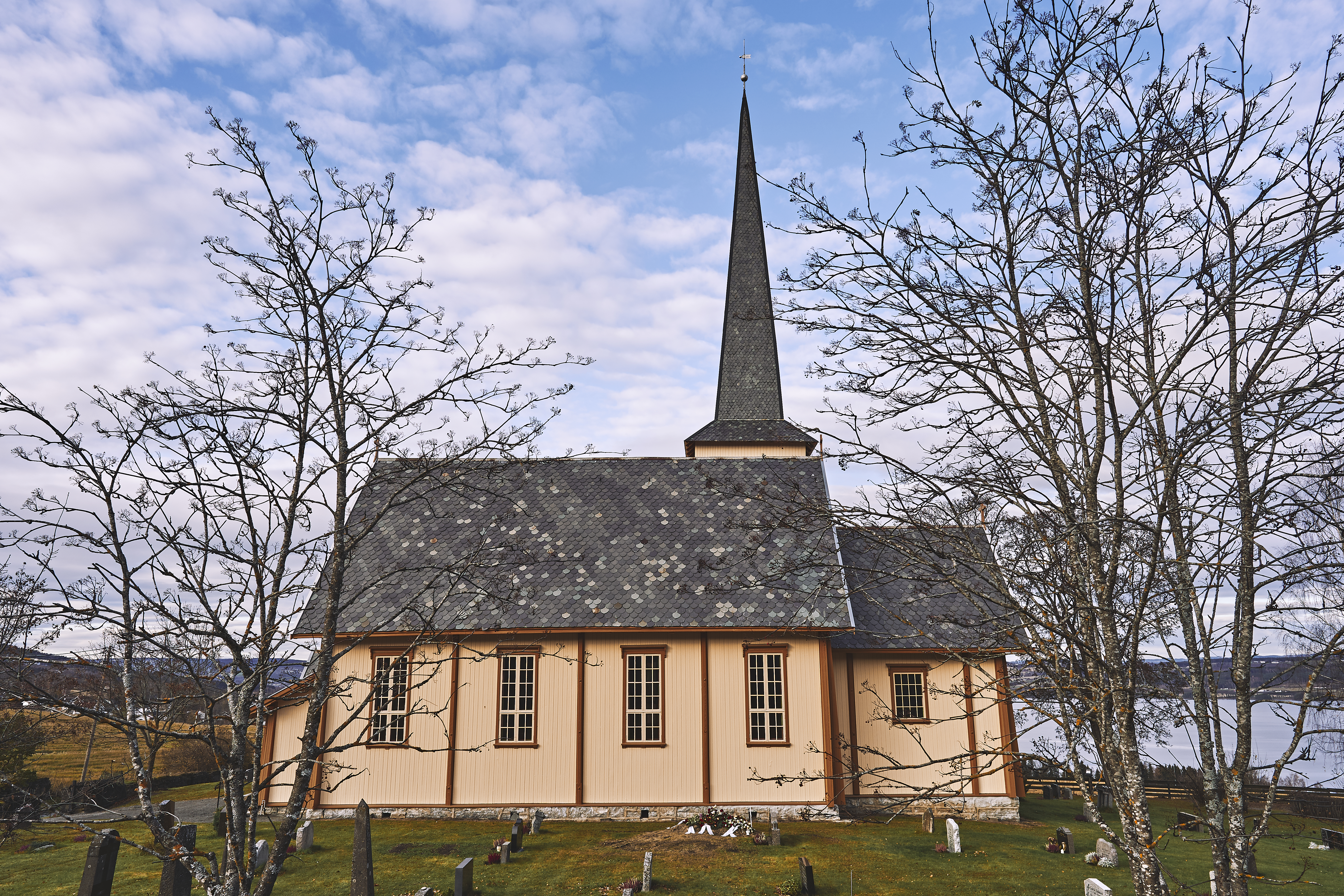

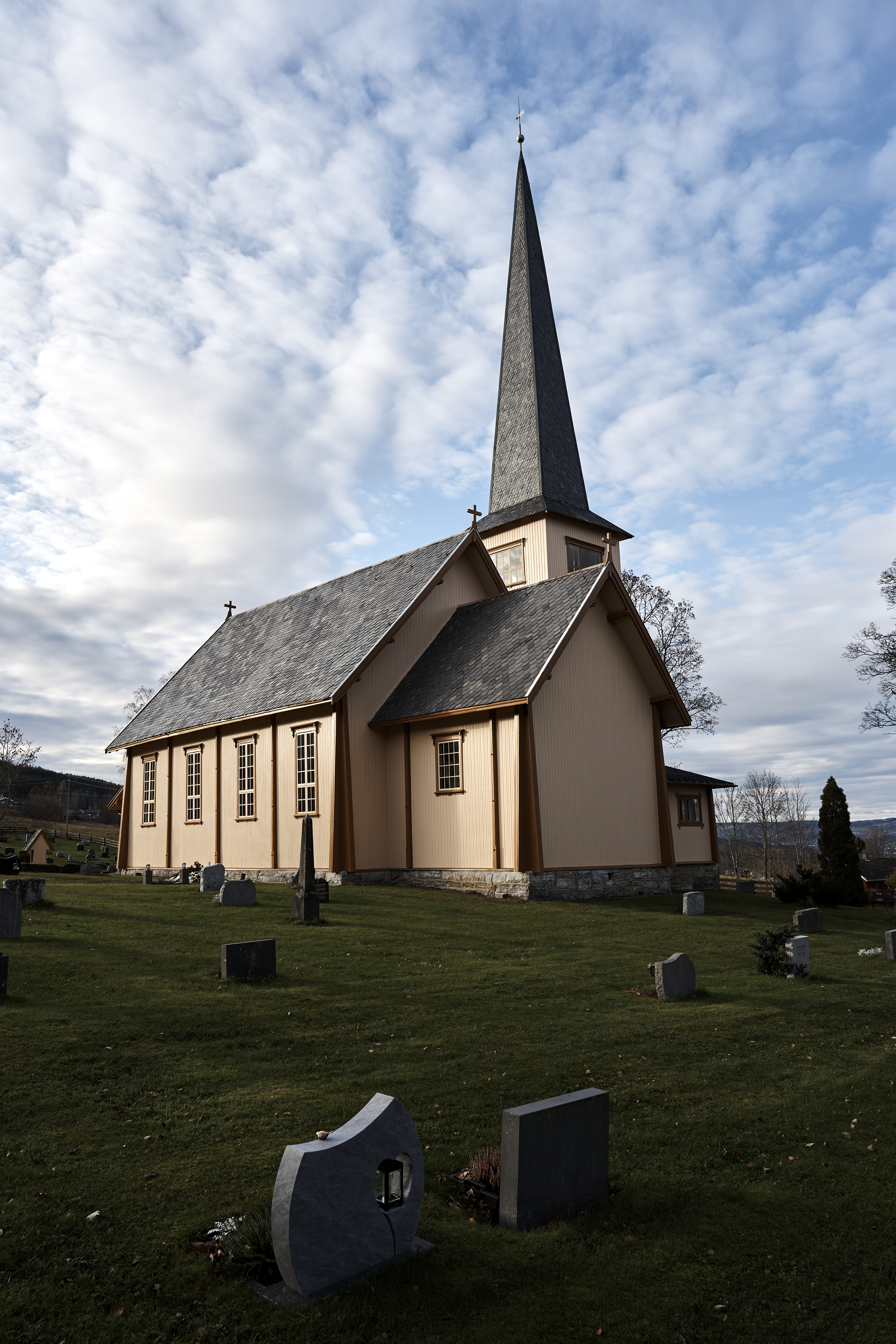

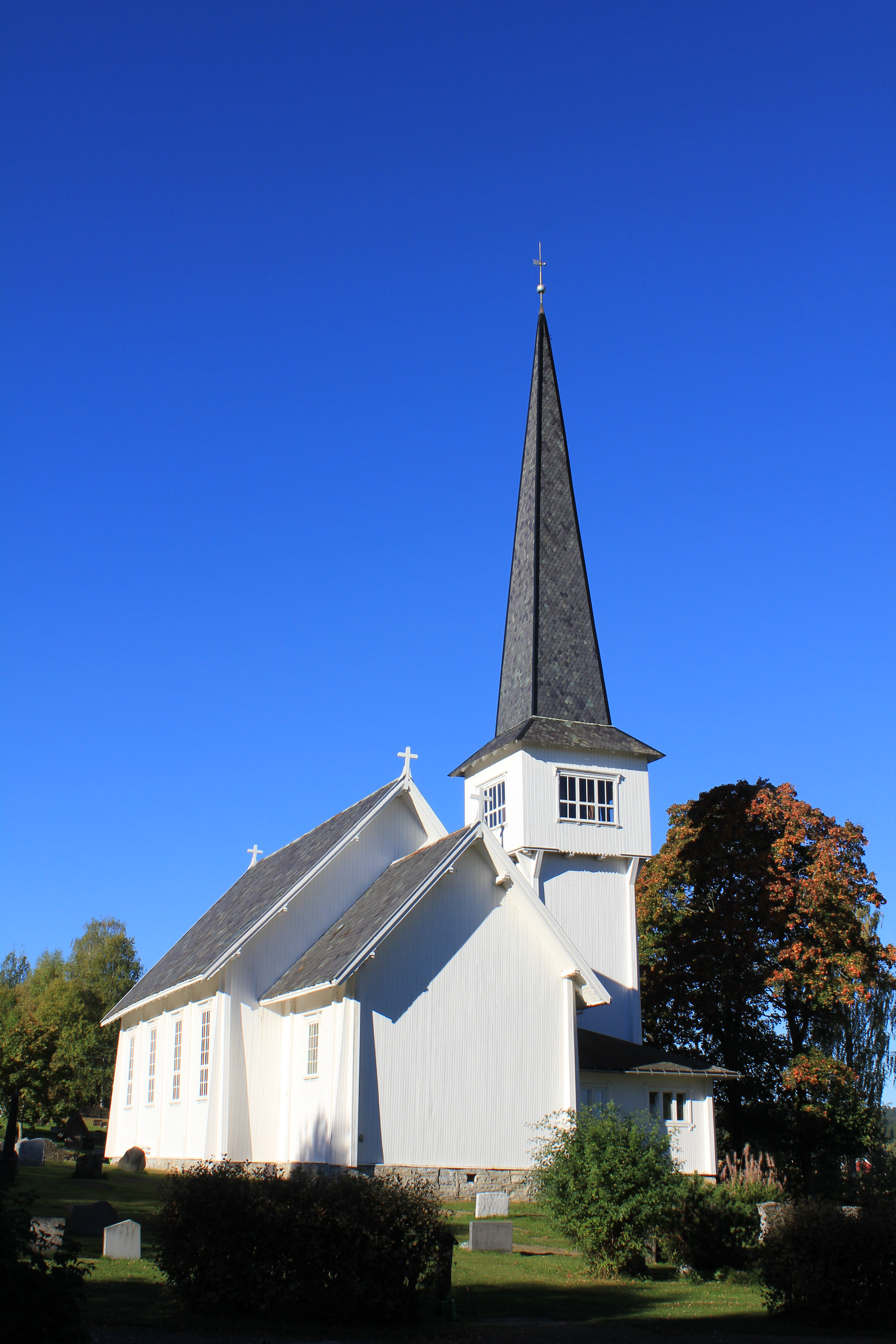

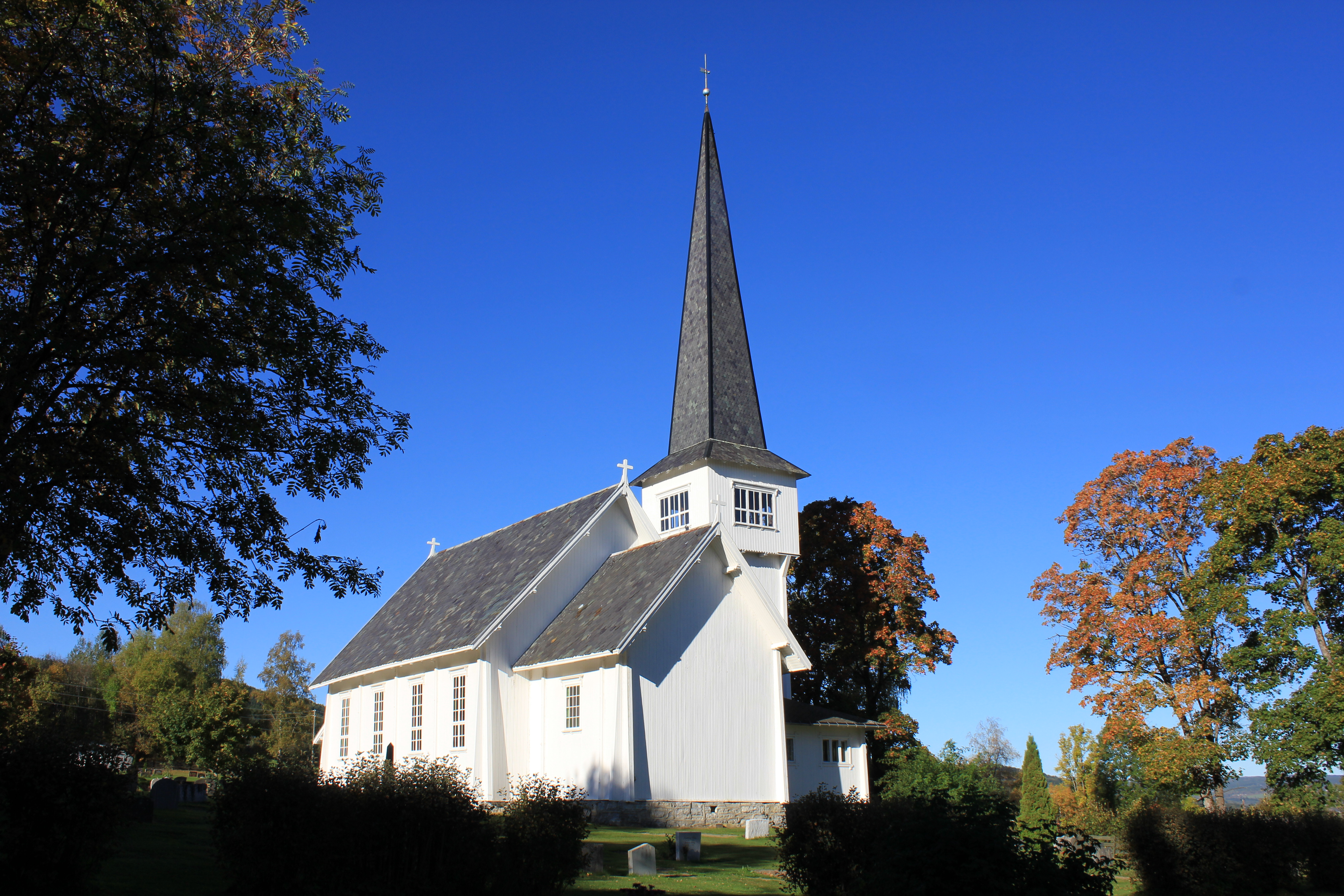

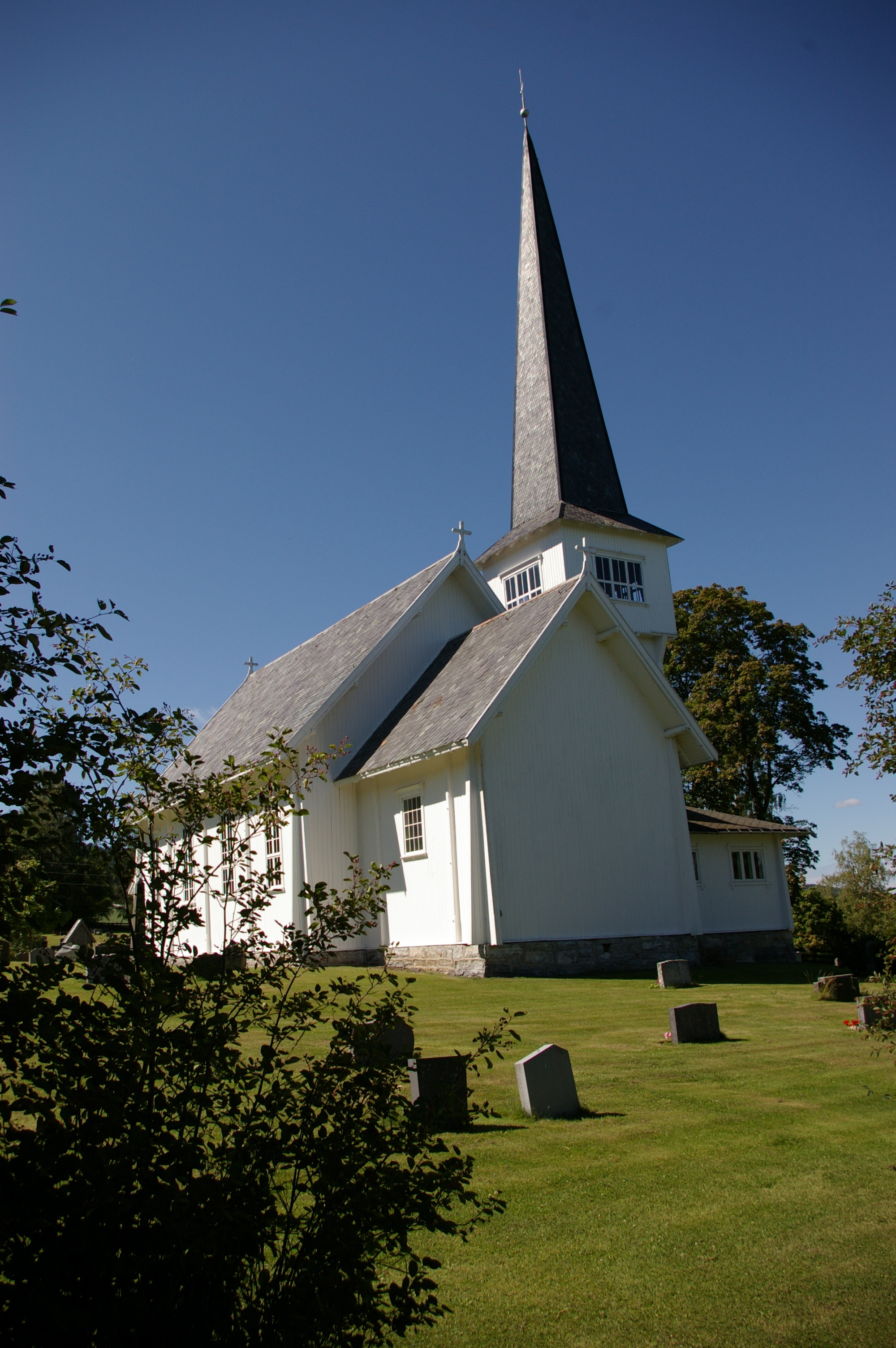

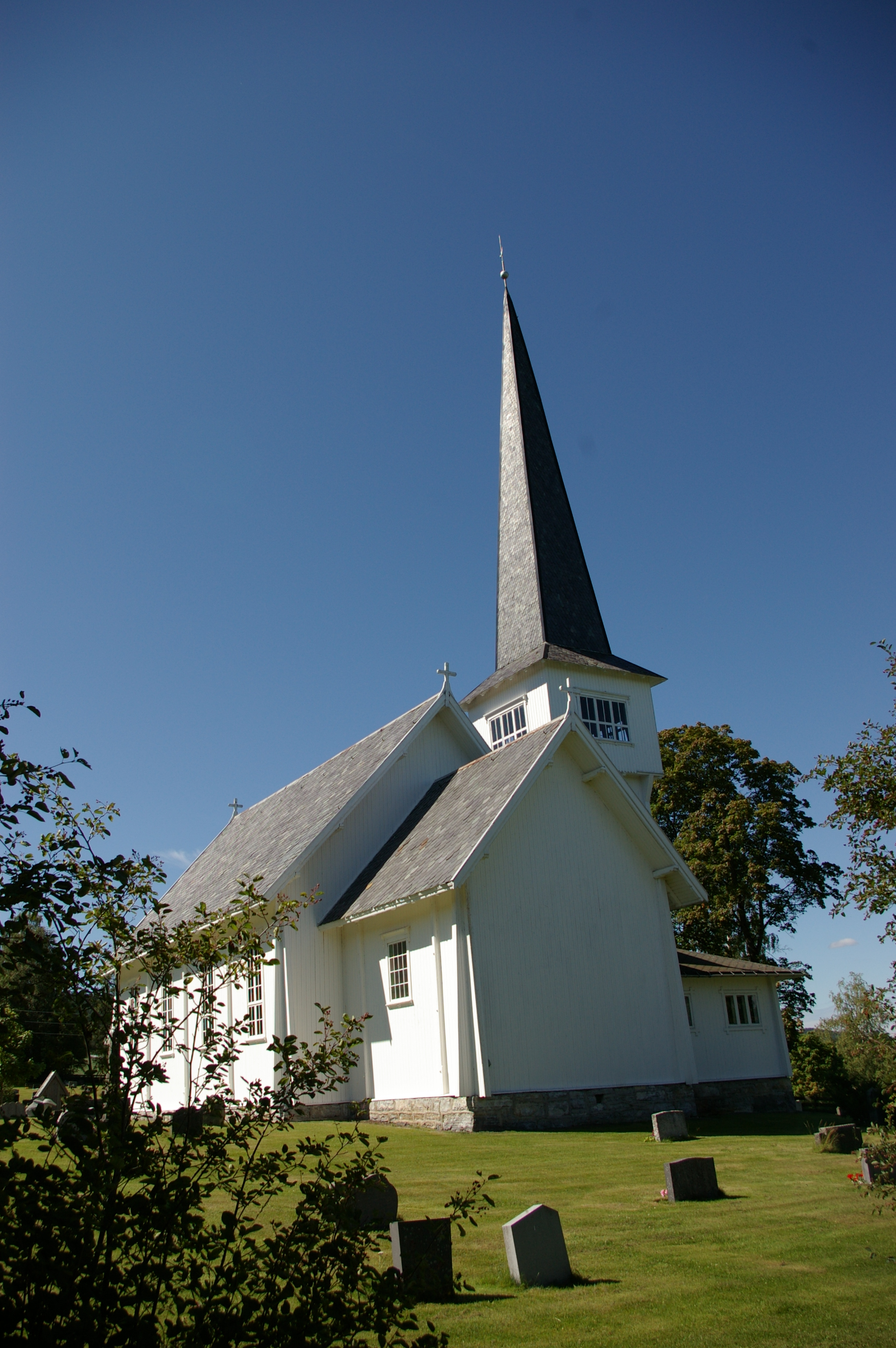

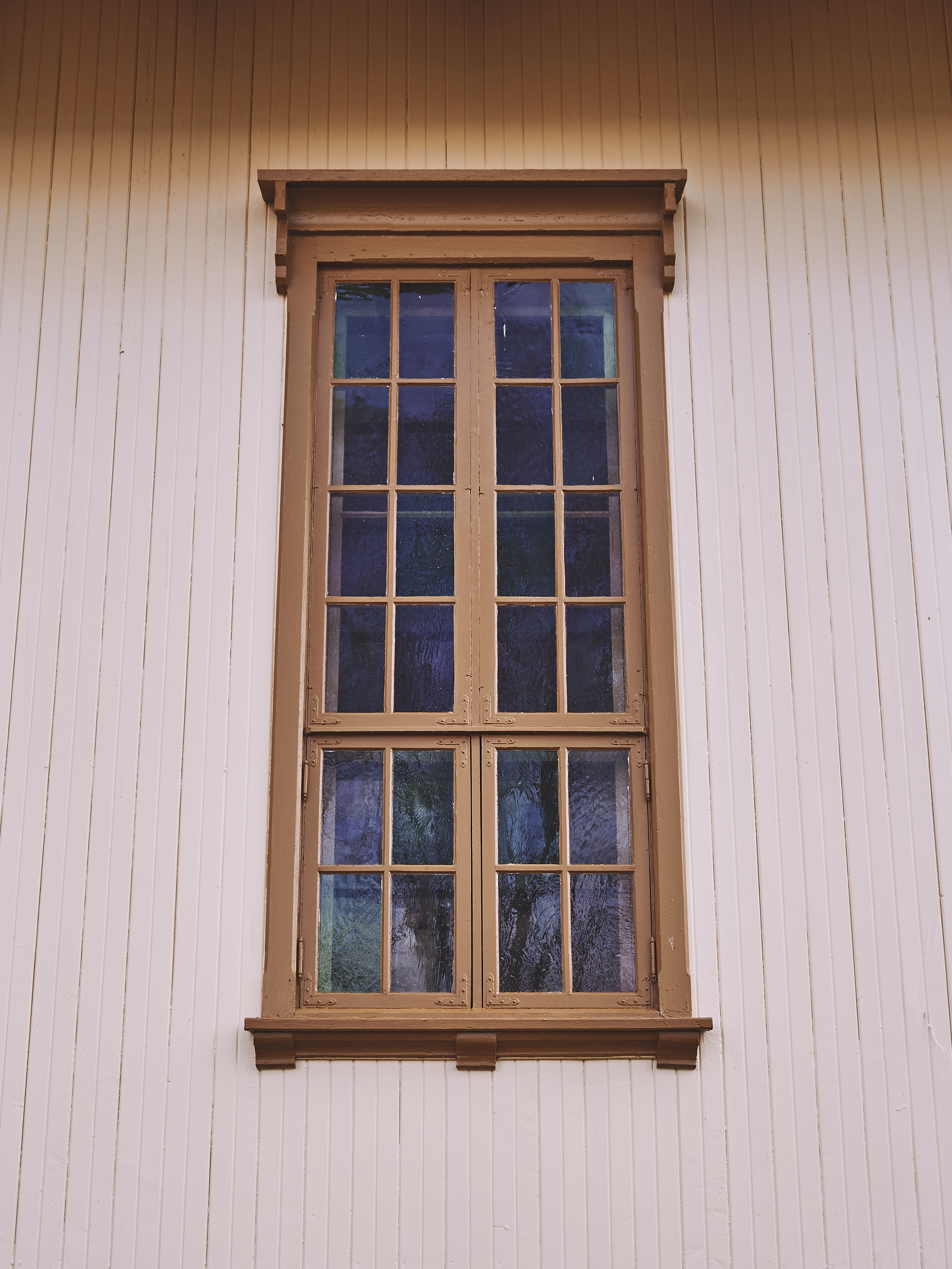

== See also ==
- List of churches in Hamar
