= Thomas Fearnley (disambiguation) =

Thomas Fearnley was a Norwegian romantic painter.

Thomas Fearnley may also refer to:

- Thomas Fearnley (shipping magnate, born 1841) (1841–1927), Norwegian shipping magnate, industrialist and philanthropist
- Thomas Fearnley (shipping magnate, born 1880) (1880–1961), Norwegian shipping magnate and philanthropist
