= Astrup Fearnley Museum of Modern Art =

Art museum in Oslo, Norway

Coordinates: 59°54′27″N 10°44′39″E

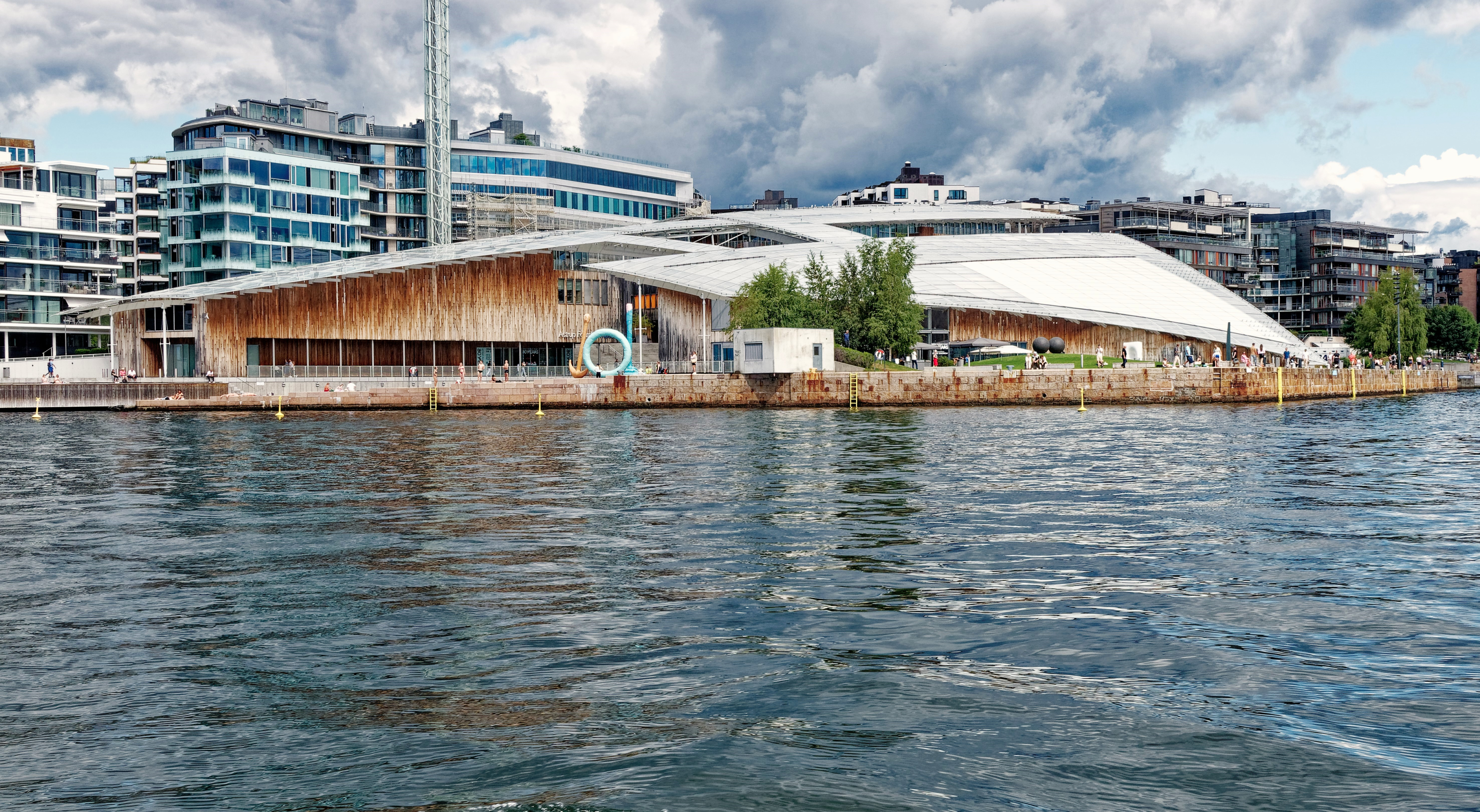
The new museum building as seen from the Oslo Fjord

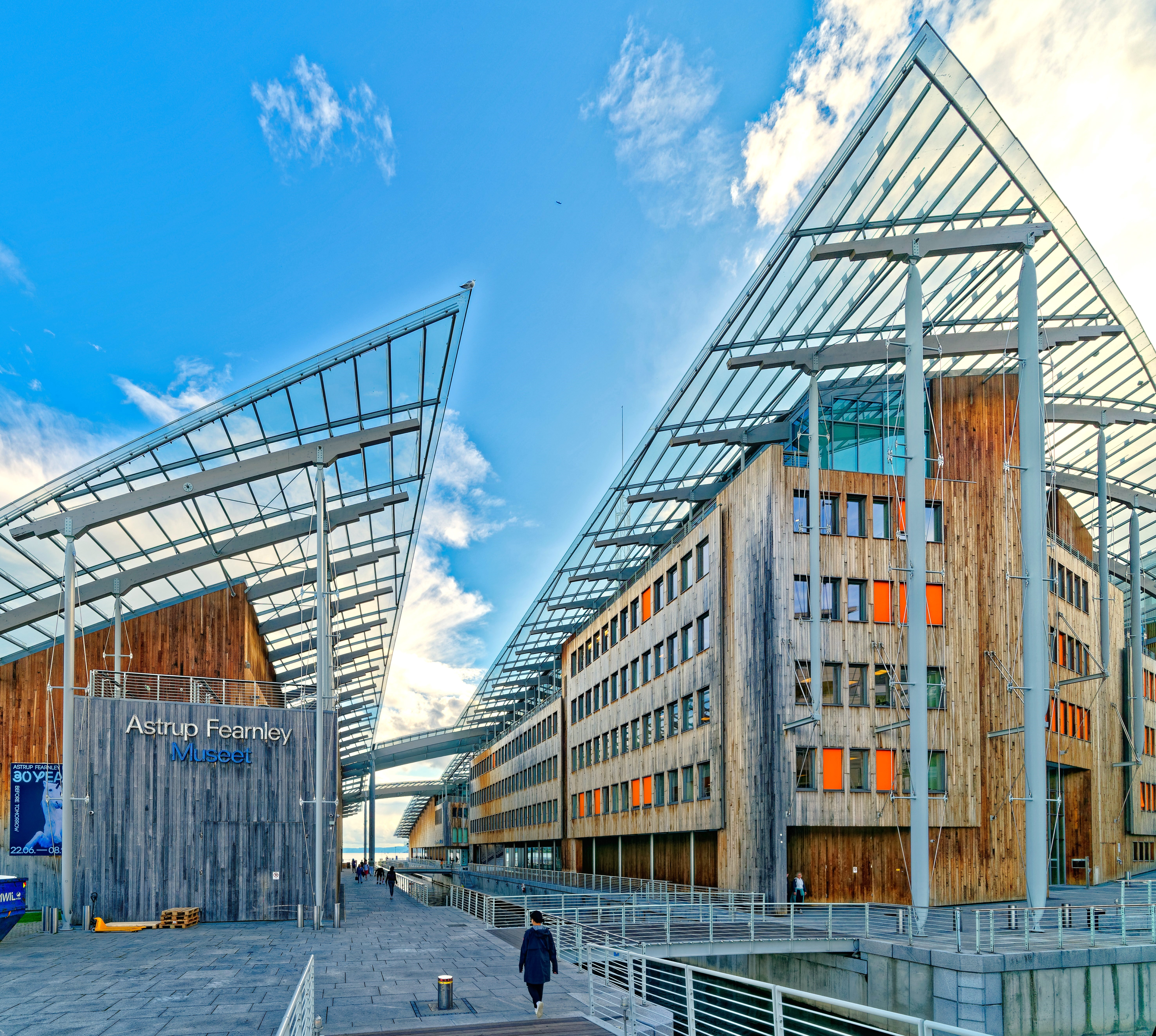
The entrance to the museum

The Astrup Fearnley Museum (Norwegian: Astrup Fearnley Museet) is a privately owned contemporary art museum in Oslo in Norway. It was founded and opened to the public in 1993. The collection's main focus is the American appropriation artists from the 1980s, but it is currently developing towards the international contemporary art scene, with artists like Jeff Koons, Richard Prince, Cindy Sherman, Matthew Barney, Tom Sachs, Doug Aitken, Olafur Eliasson, and Cai Guo-Qiang. The museum holds 6-7 temporary exhibitions each year. Astrup Fearnley Museum collaborates with international institutions and produces exhibitions that travel worldwide. In 2012 the museum moved to two new buildings designed by Renzo Piano in Tjuvholmen.

== History ==
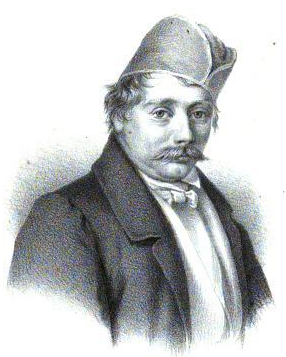
The Fearnley family of shipping magnates is descended from romantic painter Thomas Fearnley

The museum opened in 1993, and was funded by two philanthropic foundations established by descendants of the Fearnley shipping family, the Thomas Fearnley Foundation and the Heddy and Nils Astrup Foundation. The Thomas Fearnley Foundation was established by shipping magnate Thomas Fearnley (1880–1961) in 1939; he was the son of shipping magnate Thomas Fearnley (1841–1927) and grandson of romantic painter Thomas Fearnley. The Heddy and Nils Astrup Foundation was named for Nils Ebbessøn Astrup, who was a maternal grandson of Thomas Fearnley (1841–1927). The two foundations merged in 1995 to become the Thomas Fearnley, Heddy and Nils Astrup Foundation.

Until 1990, no museums in Norway were solely dedicated to contemporary art. The Astrup Fearnley Museum, alongside the National Museum of Contemporary Art, played a crucial role in introducing the Norwegian public to contemporary art.

The museum created a stir in the international art world in 2002 when it purchased the American artist Jeff Koons's monumental sculpture in gilt porcelain of the pop star Michael Jackson with Bubbles, his favourite chimpanzee, for US$5.1 million.

== The collection ==
The permanent collection consists of works of Norwegian and International Contemporary Art. The museum collection was originally based on a private collection that goes back thirty years and has significantly developed with the many changes in modern/contemporary art. There has been an interest in German Abstract Expressionism, English modern painting, and the Young British Artists. Presently the collection is orientated towards the young American art scene. It also encompasses works pertaining to the steadily increasing global art community. The main areas of curatorial expertise in the museum are art from the 1960s to the present, including American and European pop-art, post-modern appropriation art of the 1980s and international contemporary art. The collection includes works by artists such as:

Janine Antoni, Francis Bacon, Matthew Barney, Dado, Gardar Eide Einarsson, Robert Gober, Felix Gonzalez-Torres, Douglas Gordon, Cai Guo-Qiang, Damien Hirst, Anselm Kiefer, Jeff Koons, Louise Lawler, Sherrie Levine, Bjarne Melgaard, Bruce Nauman, Shirin Neshat, Sigmar Polke, Richard Prince, Charles Ray, Jason Rhoades, Gerhard Richter, Tom Sachs, Cindy Sherman, Rirkrit Tiravanija, and Andy Warhol.

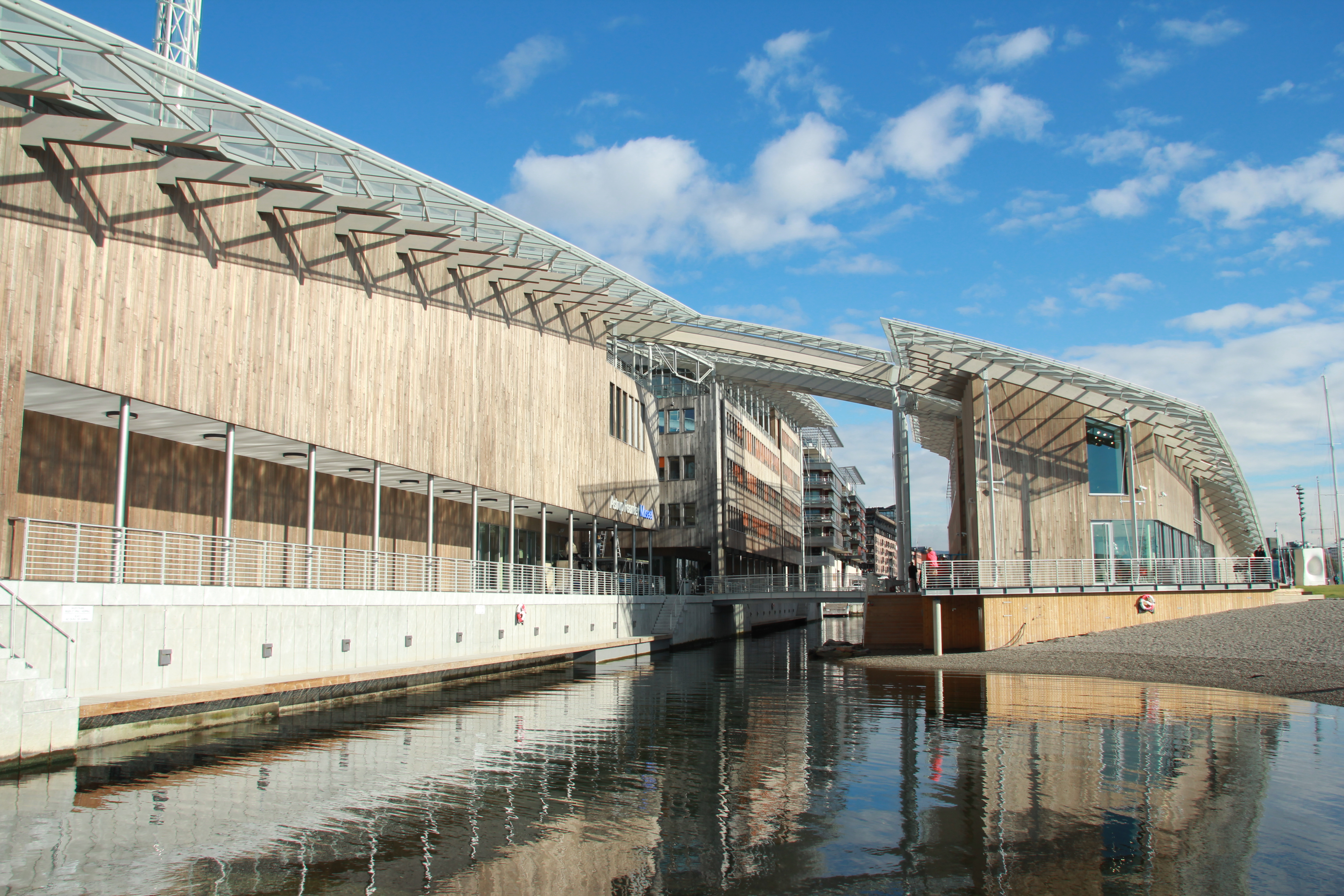
The new museum on Tjuvholmen

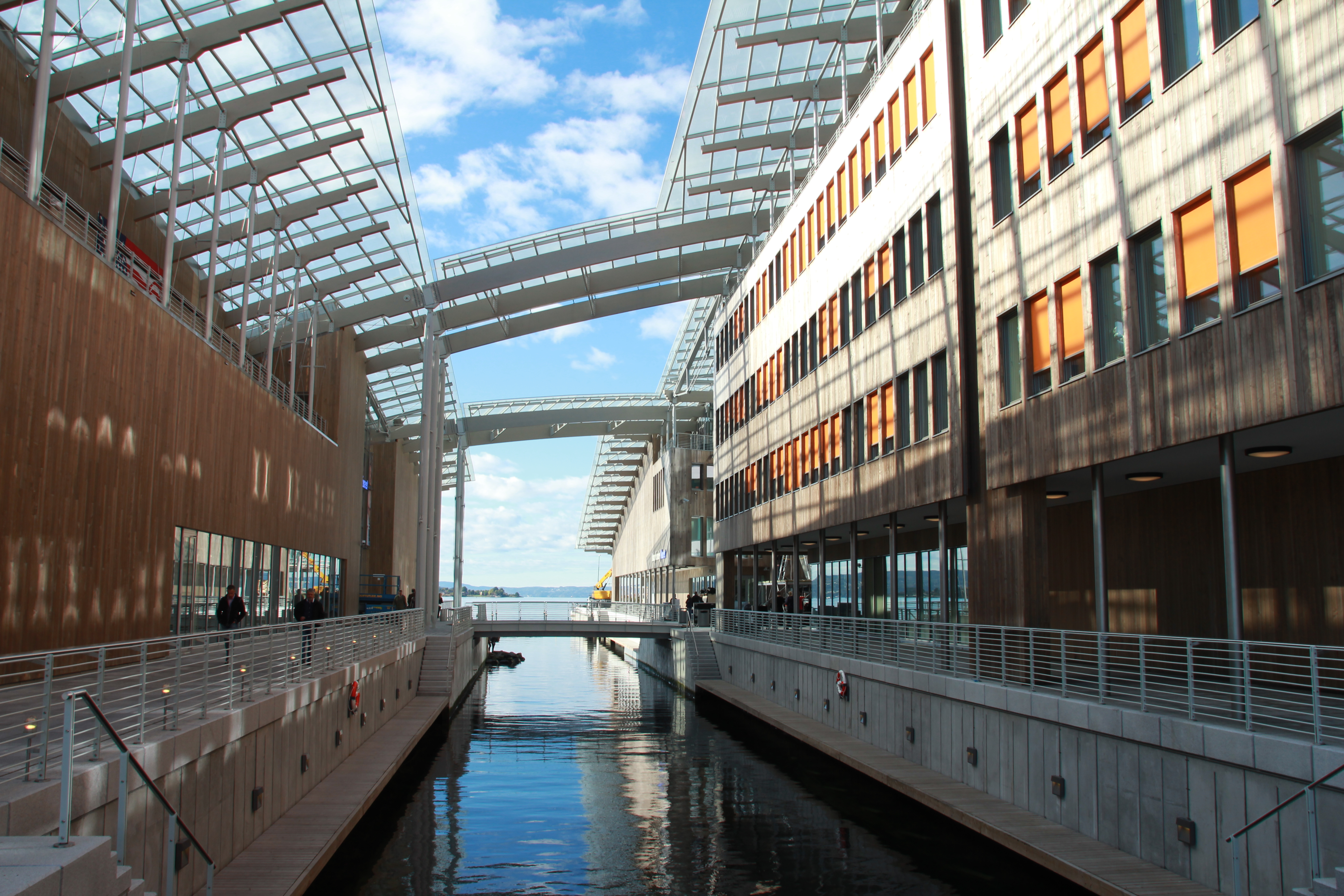
Architecture of Renzo Piano

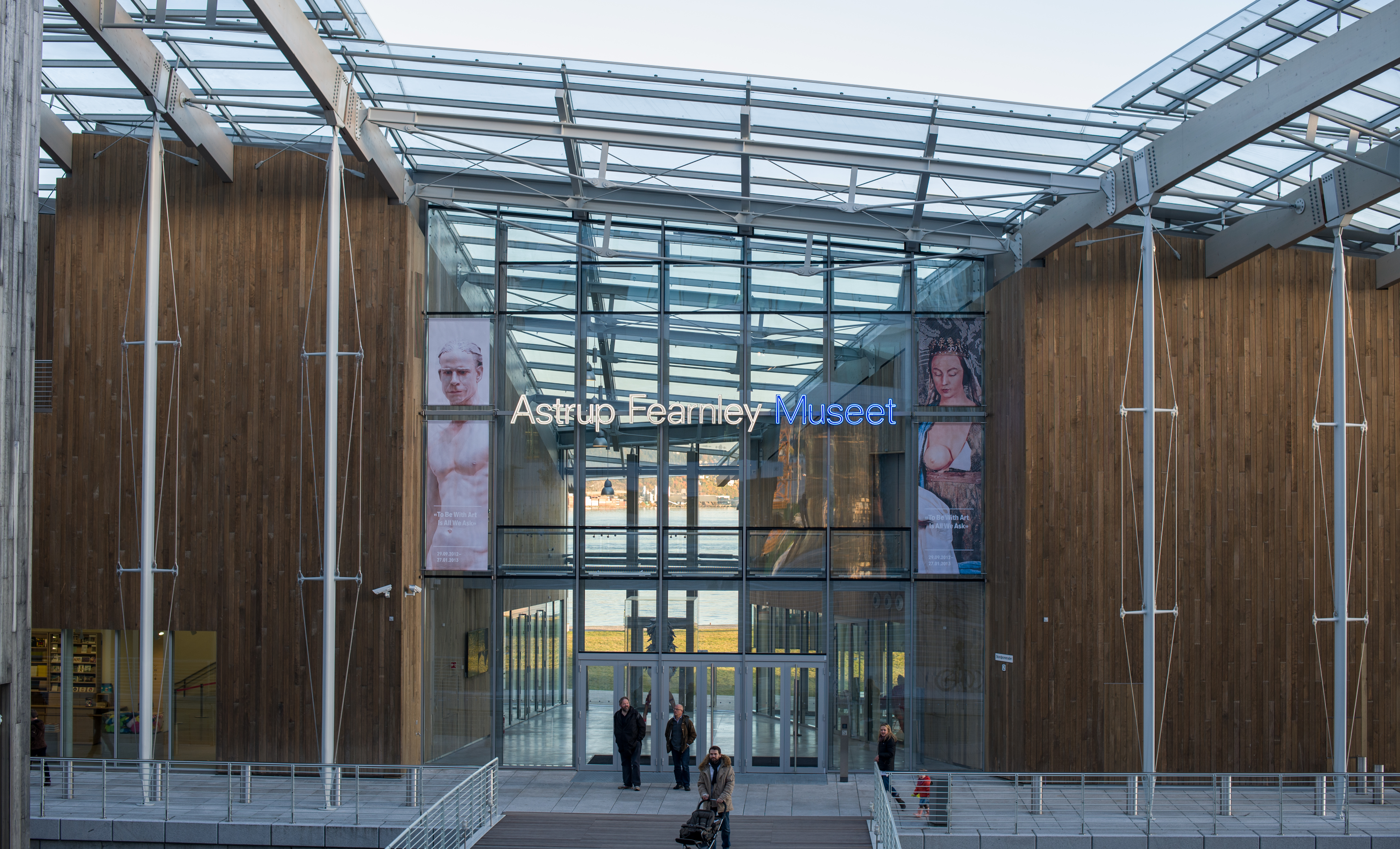
Astrup Fearnley Museum

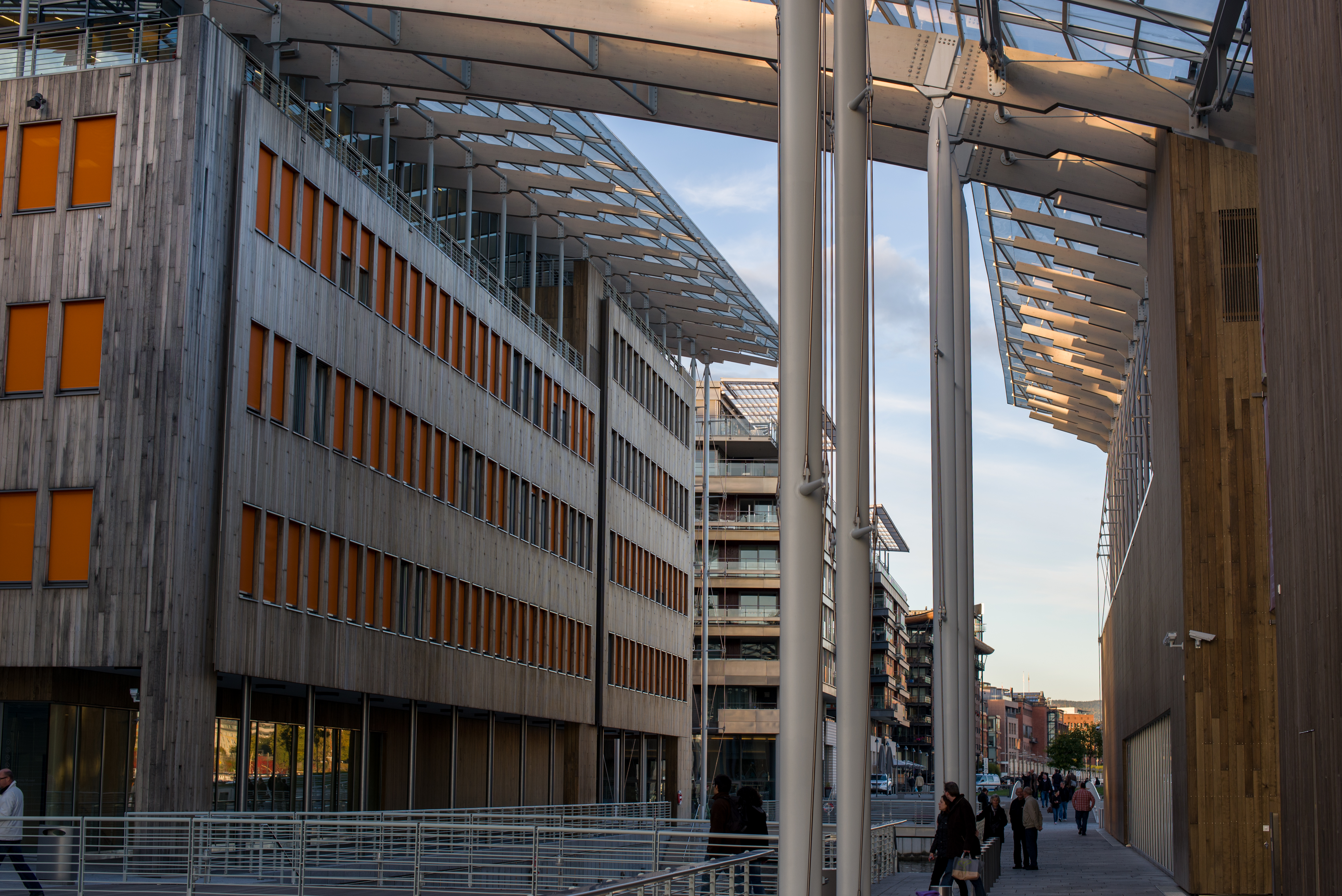
Astrup Fearnley Museum

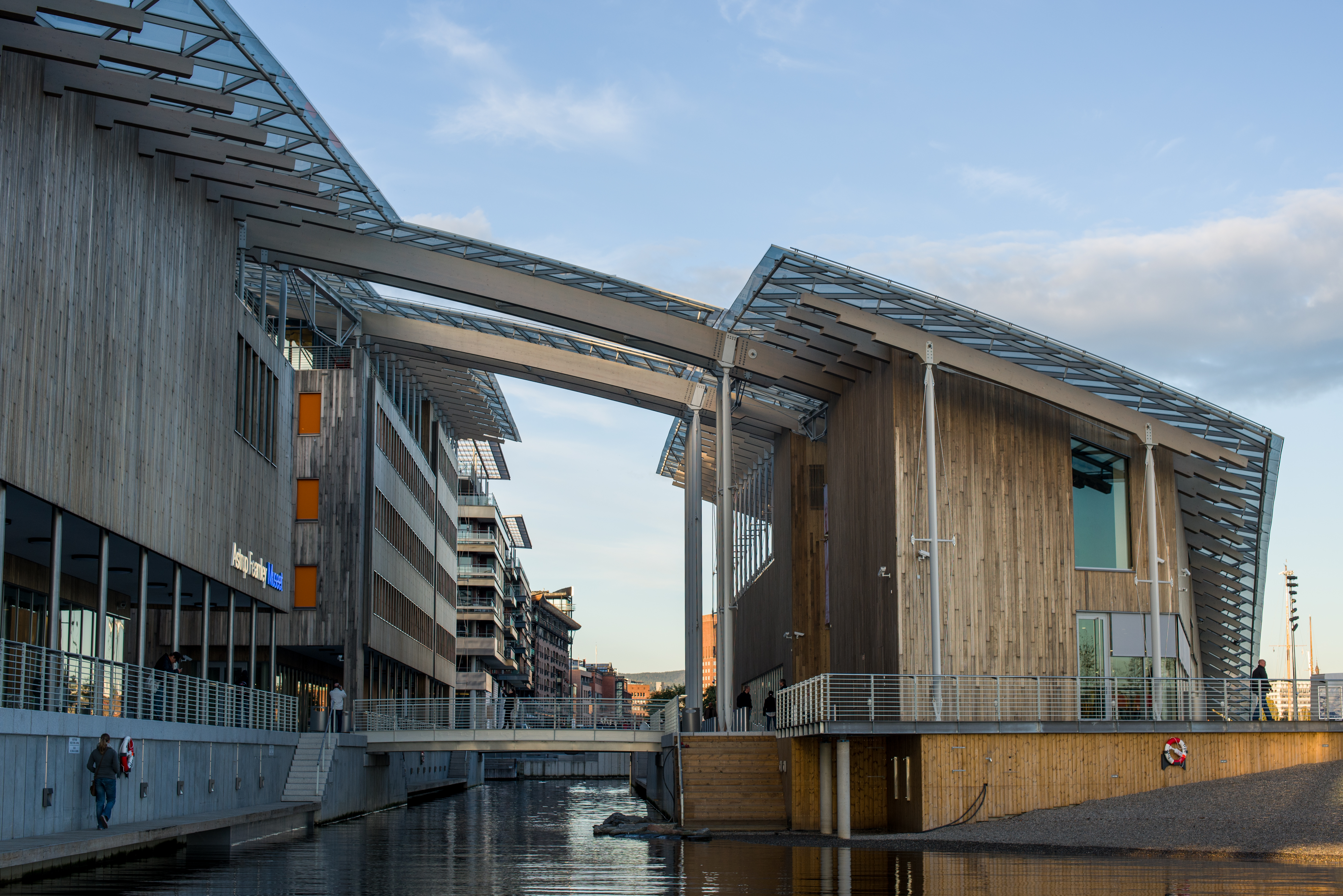
Astrup Fearnley Museum

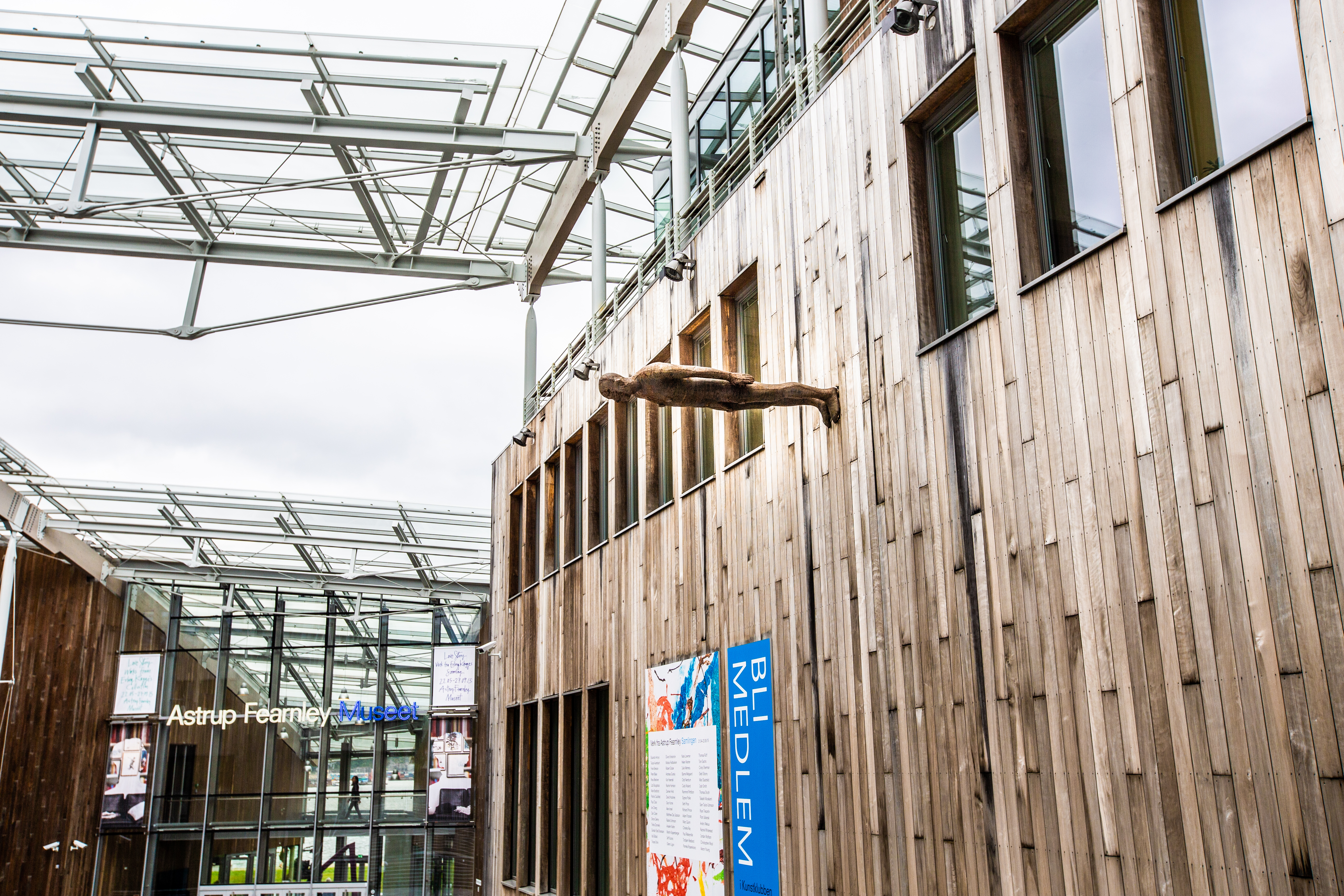
Sculpture outside of the Astrup Fearnley Museum

== Exhibitions ==
- "Europe, Europe"—2014
- 2012
  - To Be With Art Is All We Ask.
  - Highlights from the permanent collection.
- 2011
  - VideoSpace.
  - Surrounding Bacon & Warhol.
  - Dan Colen-Peanuts.
- 2010
  - Ernesto Neto – Intimacy.
  - Gardar Eide Einarsson – Power has a Fragrance.
  - Bjarne Melgaard – Jealous.
- 2009
  - Rotating Views #2 – Astrup Fearnley Collection.
  - Nate Lowman – The Natriot Act.
  - Indian Highway.
  - Rotating Views #1 – Astrup Fearnley Collection.
- 2008
  - Andy Warhol by Andy Warhol.
  - Meet me around the corner.
  - Huang Yong Ping – Ping Pong.
  - LIGHTS ON – Norwegian Contemporary Art.
- 2007
  - China Power Station: Part II.
  - Ann Lislegaard – Science Fiction and other worlds.
  - Richard Prince – Canaries in the Coal Mine.
- 2006
  - Charles Ray – Black & White.
  - MORE THAN THE WORLD – Astrup Fearnley Collection.
  - Knut Åsdam – Retrospective.
  - Not all is visible – Astrup Fearnley Collection.
  - Tom Sachs: SURVEY. America – Modernism – Fashion.
  - Astrup Fearnley Collection: Photo and Video.
- 2005
  - Uncertain States of America – American Art in the 3rd Millennium.
  - MO(NU)MENTS! Astrup Fearnley Collection.
  - Damien Hirst.
  - Yoko Ono: Horizontal Memories.
- 2004
  - Jeff Koons: Retrospective.
  - Everything is Connected.
  - Jeff Wall – Tableaux.
  - Olafur Eliasson – Colour memory and other informal shadows.
  - Vibeke Tandberg.
- 2003
  - Everyday Aesthetics – Works from the Astrup Fearnley Collection.
  - Matthew Barney – The Cremaster Cycle.
  - The Painting never dries... Reflections over paintings in the Astrup Fearnley Collection.
  - Torbjørn Rødland – Grave with a view.
  - Robert Gober – Displacements.
  - Janet Cardiff – Georges Bures Miller.
- 2002
  - Børre Larsen – Comments.
  - Jens Johannessen – Allegory – Paintings 1998-2002.
  - Mike Bidlo – Not Picasso, Not Pollock, Not Warhol.
  - Reality fantasies – Post-modern Art from the Astrup Fearnley Collection.
  - Mari Slaattelid – Concealing Redness.
  - Claude Rutault – The Painting in the same colour as the wall on which it is hung.
  - Passenger – The Viewer as Participant.
- 2001
  - Leonard Rickhard – Soft Whispers in the Birch Wood.
  - Museum 2 – Works from the Astrup Fearnley Collection.
  - Børre Sæthre – My Private Sky.
  - Sigmar Polke – Alchimist.
- 2000
  - Bjørn Carlsen.
  - Museum – Works from the Astrup Fearnley Collection.
  - Tom Sandberg – Photographs.
  - Sincerely Yours.
- 1999
  - Kjell Torriset – Second Nature.
  - Anna Gaskell.
  - School of Oslo.
  - Gilbert & George 1970-1997.
  - Gerhard Richter.
  - Alberto Chissano & Titos Mabota – Two Artists, Two Generations.
- 1998
  - Odd Nerdrum – Tyve års tilbakeblikk.
  - Siste nytt – Works from the Astrup Fearnley Collection.
  - Olivier Debré in Norway.
  - Veikryss – Works from the Astrup Fearnley Collection.
  - R.B Kitaj – An American in Europe.
- 1997
  - Olav Chr. Jenssen – Biographie 1982 – 1997.
  - Åpnet rom – Works from the Astrup Fearnley Collection.
  - Ørnulf Opdahl -Ved Havet.
  - Per Inge Bjørlo/ Tom Sandberg.
  - Giacometti/ de Staël – a Precarious Balance.
- 1996
  - Frans Widerberg. Maleri 1956 – 1996.
  - Håvard Vikhagen (festival exhibition).
  - "Memory of the World" (UNESCO).
  - Works from the Astrup Fearnley Collection.
  - Malcom Morley 1965 – 1995.
- 1995
  - Knut Rose – Personlig rapport – Retrospective.
  - Ross Bleckner.
  - Christopher le Brun.
- 1994
  - …og vestenfor måne – 13 Norwegian painters.
  - Double Reality – The school of London.
- 1993
  - Opening Exhibition.

== Old museum building ==
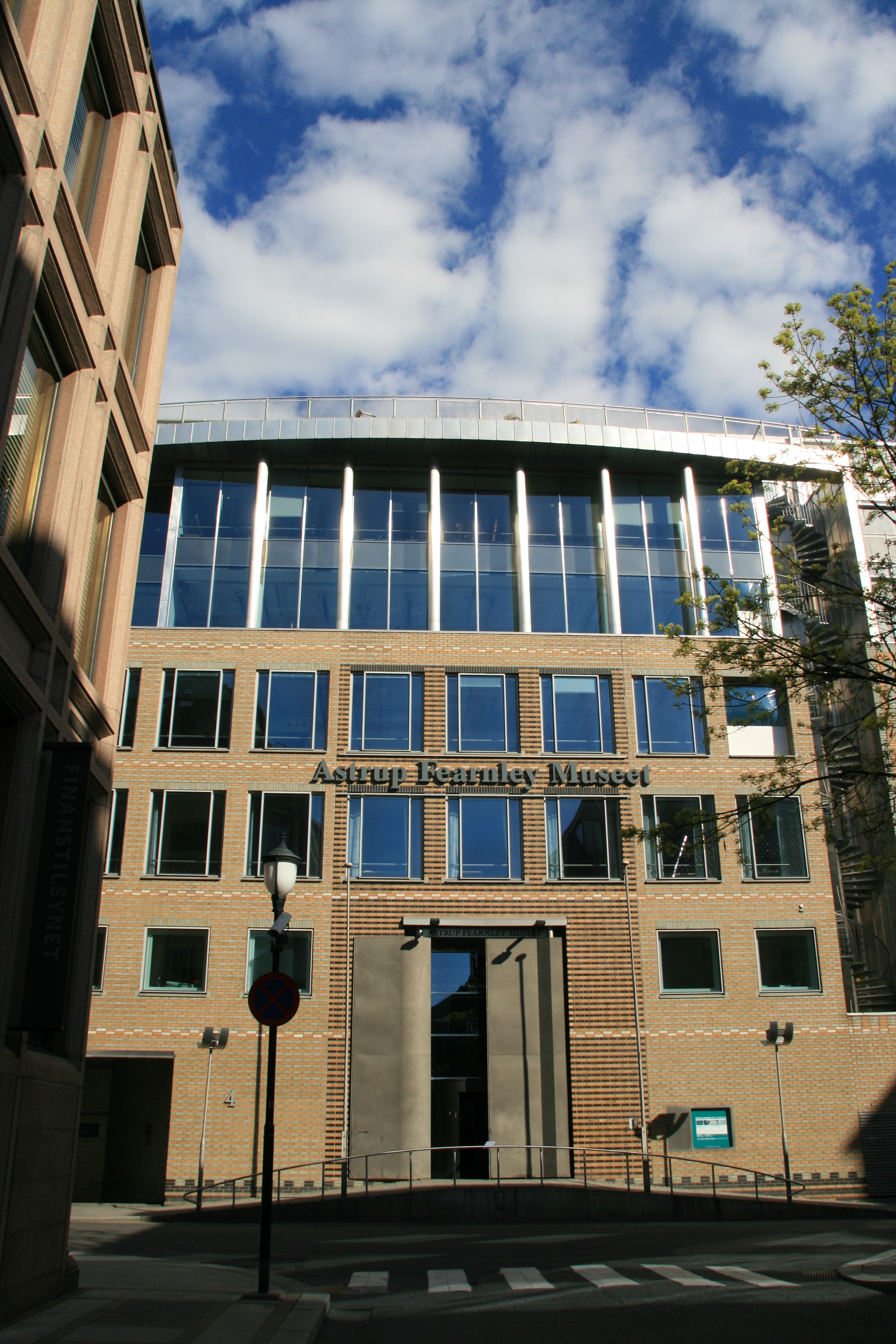
The old museum entrance

The Astrup Fearnley Museum is an independent part of the Astrup Fearnley building complex, which covers approximately one half of a city block. Designed by LPO architects and designers, the museum opened in the autumn of 1993 and encloses an area of about 2500m².

The old museum building had a main entrance on Revierstredet, marked with monumentally large steel doors; when the doors are open, one can see from a great distance that the museum is open.

The exhibition spaces covered two floors. The height of the galleries varies from 3,5 to 10,5 meters. In the design of the gallery spaces, the emphasis is upon the rooms expressing humility in relation to the artworks; simultaneously they provide the works with a beautiful and functional frame. Emphasis is also laid upon the entryway and exhibition spaces being airy and pleasant to move about in. The floor-design provides great flexibility for temporary constructions and installations. The choice of materials expresses quality but with limited means—here the artworks are the main focus. The concrete wall, like a circular movement in the museum, establishes a powerful but nevertheless subdued backdrop; the stairway to the main gallery, formed in steel with steps of smoked oak, shows an unambiguous connection between the two floors. The stone floor is made of Cascais Azul, a Portuguese sandstone.

Aside from the sculpture garden, the exhibition spaces are devoid of daylight, yet they have general artificial lighting that can be specifically adapted to any requirement.

The administration department is situated on the mezzanine; with a predominance of steel elements, it is an architectural volume in its own right.

== New museum ==
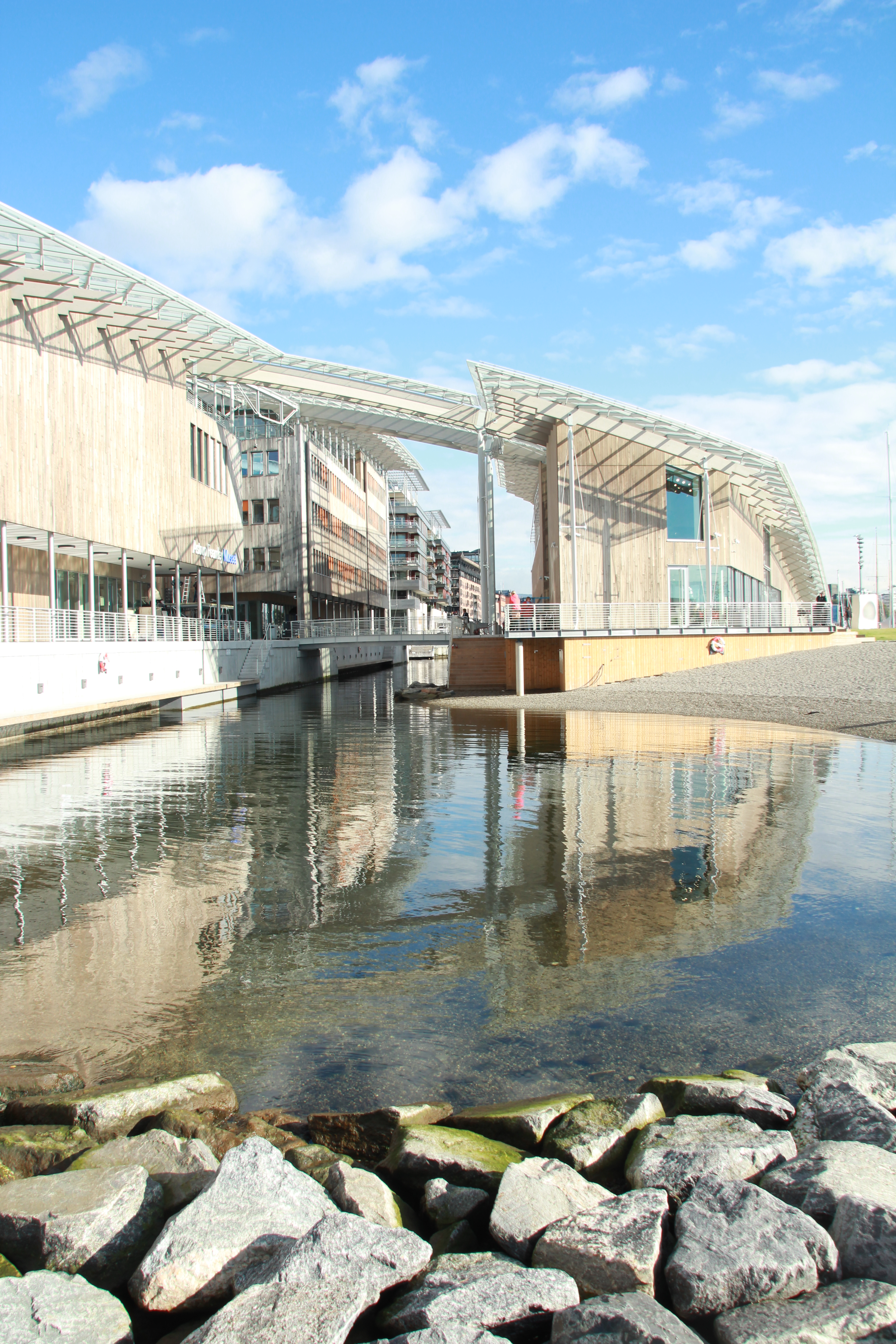
The new building by Renzo Piano.

The Astrup Fearnley Museum is now situated on Tjuvholmen in the centre of Oslo. The new museum was designed by the architect Renzo Piano and opened on 29 September 2012,. It consists of two buildings housing the museum's permanent collection as well as temporary exhibitions.

Large, modern exhibition spaces give the museum the possibility to continue its ambitious program of temporary exhibitions. Altogether, Astrup Fearnley Museum has at its disposition about 4200 m². The museum is situated in the Tjuvholmen skulpturpark, also designed by Renzo Piano.

== Controversies ==
In 2012, the decision by the private Astrup Fearnley Museum to accept sponsorship from the Norwegian arm of the Swedish-based oil company Lundin Petroleum caused public criticism.
