= Lilje =

Lilje is a surname. Notable people with the surname include:

- Hanns Lilje (1899–1977), German Lutheran bishop
- Per Barth Lilje (born 1957), Norwegian astronomer
