= Untitled V =

Photograph by Andreas Gursky

Untitled V is a color photograph made by German photographer Andreas Gursky, in 1997. It had an edition of six prints. The picture follows the usual method of digital manipulation used by Gursky since 1990.

== Description and analysis ==
It depicts the interior of what appears to be a luxury goods store, with a showcase displaying six rows of about 200 trainers, namely of Nike footwear. The photograph presents, like others of his works, multi-coloured objects in rows, against a white monochrome backgroung, in his personal take on the topics of consumerism and globalization in the modern societies. Each sport footwear is depicted clearly and in a detailed manner. Artistically the work references both the minimalism of authors like Donald Judd, and the pop art tradition of Andy Warhol, in the depiction of high consumerism goods.

Peter Galassi mentions in Gursky's works like the current one, "the solemn majesty of infinite progression (...) into the anesthetic repetitions of the assembly line and the display case".

David Bate states: "The abstract display of shoes focuses exclusively on the "ideal beauty" of a shop display spectacle, offered to the global consumer. In much the way modernist art removed "social context" from its content and environment, Gursky's photograph shows that the space of social consumption does this too."

== Art market ==
A print of the photograph was sold by $1,508,316 at Christie's London, on 15 February 2011.

== Public collections ==
There are prints of this photograph at the Kunstmuseum Wolfsburg, and at the Astrup Fearnley Museum of Modern Art, in Oslo.
