= Hans Rasmus Astrup (born 1939) =

Norvegian businessman (1939–2021)

- Born: 23 March 1939; Oslo, Norway
- Died: 23 April 2021 (aged 82)
- Occupations: ship broker and art collector
- Known for: founder, Astrup Fearnley Museum of Modern Art
- Father: Nils Ebbessøn Astrup

Hans Rasmus Astrup (23 March 1939 – 23 April 2021) was a Norwegian billionaire heir, ship broker, and art collector. He was founder of the Astrup Fearnley Museum of Modern Art in Oslo.

== Early and personal life ==
Astrup was born in Oslo in March 1939. His parents were ship owners Nils Ebbessøn Astrup and Hedevig Stang.

He was a bachelor, with no children.

== Career ==
Having passed examen artium in 1958, Astrup graduated as cand.jur. in 1966. He then worked for various companies outside Norway, mostly in New York City, in order to achieve qualifications in the fields of finance and shipping. When his father died in 1972, Astrup took over leadership of the ship broker company Fearnley & Egers Befragtningsforretning AS.

Astrup was heir to a "substantial shipping and real-estate empire", which he has grown.

In 2011, his net worth was estimated at NOK 5 billion.

In 2013, he was described as a "billionaire" and had established a second foundation.

== Art collector ==
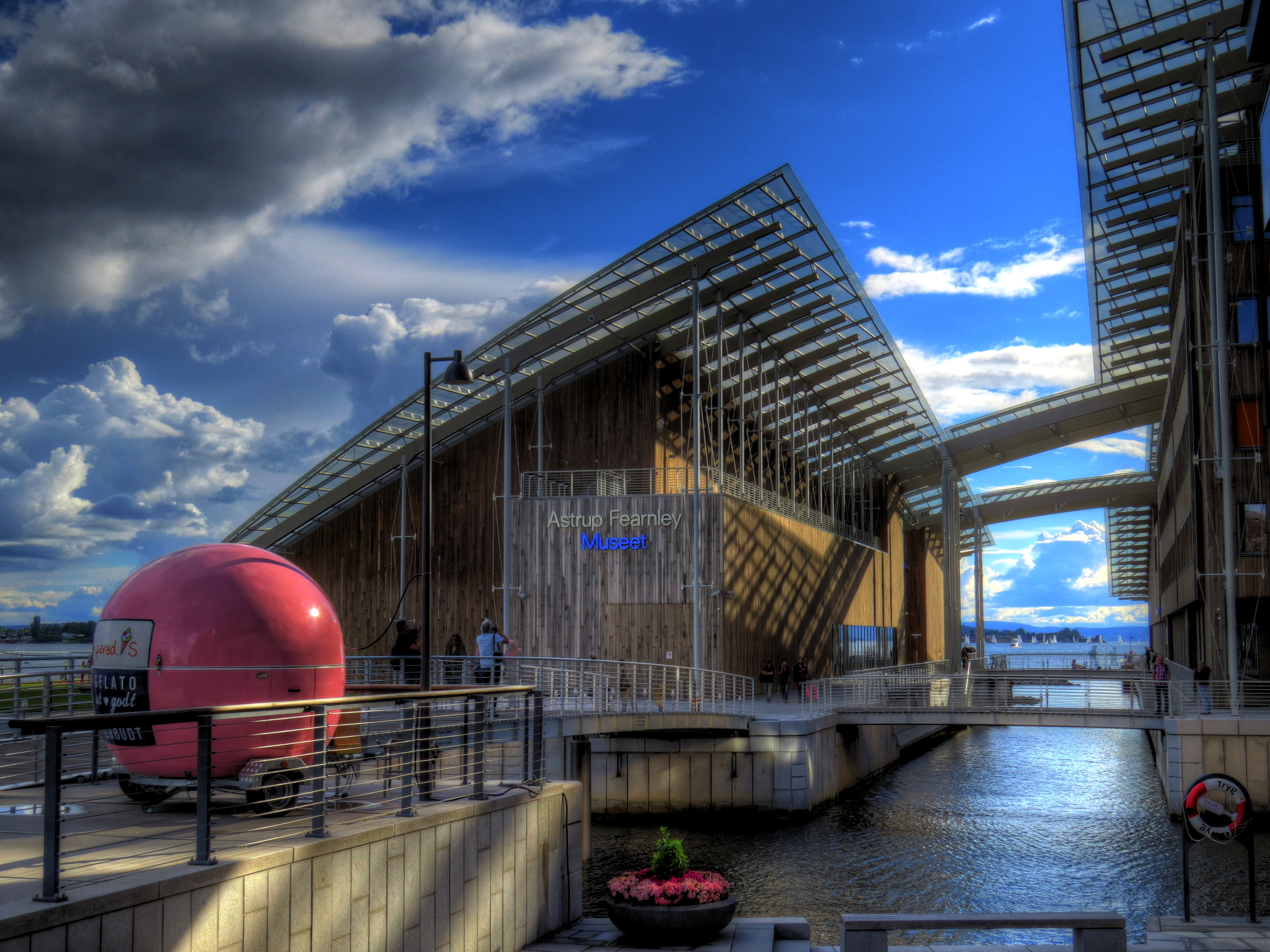
The Astrup Fearnley Museum of Modern Art

In 1993, he founded the Astrup Fearnley Museum of Modern Art in Oslo, Norway.

Astrup appeared in the ARTnews list of the top 200 collectors every year since 1992. He had a collection of about 1,500 works of avant-garde Norwegian and international art.
