= N. O. Young Fearnley =

Norwegian businessperson and landowner

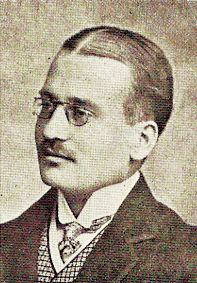
N. O. Young Fearnley

Nils Olav Young Fearnley (14 December 1881 – 30 June 1961) was a Norwegian businessperson and landowner.

== Personal life ==
He was born in Kristiania to the ship-owner Thomas Fearnley (1841–1927) and his wife Elisabeth Young (1854–1932). He was the younger brother of Thomas Fearnley (1880–1961), grandson of romantic painter Thomas Fearnley (1802-1842), paternal grandnephew of Carl Frederik Fearnley (1818-1890) and maternal grand-grandson of Nicolai Andresen (1781–1861).

== Career ==
N. O. Young Fearnley attended Handelshochschule Leipzig in Leipzig, Germany. He later gained practical training in forestry and agriculture and wood pulp, paper and sawmill industry in Sweden and Norway as well as office practice at a wood processing company in London. He also spent learning years at the Jørgen Young properties near the village of Hakadal in Nittedal Municipality in Akershus county. In 1906 he incorporated AS Meraker Brug as a forestry company after merging in the estates Forbygdgodset and Mostadmarka. He was the factory manager at Meraker Brug until 1912. In 1913, Fearnley acquired farmland and woodland acreage with a sawmill in Nannestad Municipality in Akershus county. He also owned farmland and forest acreage with sawmills in Gjerstad Municipality in Aust-Agder county and Treungen in Nissedal Municipality in Telemark county. After 1919, he was a principally a landowner based at his estate Aas Gård in Hakadal.

Fearnley chaired Papirindustriens arbeidsgiverforening and was a vice president of the Federation of Norwegian Industries. He chaired the supervisory council of Ringnes Bryggeri, was a board member of the Norwegian Employers' Confederation, Forsikringsselskapet Viking, Lillestrøms Cellulosefabrikk as well as Meraker Brug and Ranheim Papirfabrikk. He was a member of the Norwegian Museum of Cultural History and the Norwegian Kennel Club and was a founder and honorary member of the gentlemen's club SK Fram.

== Personal life ==
In 1906 he married Ingeborg Heiberg (1884-1974), a daughter of diplomat and financier Axel Heiberg (1848–1932). They were the parents of Thomas Young Fearnley (1906-1924), Ragnhild Fearnley (1908-1991) and Wanda Fearnley (1915-1991) who was married to ship owner Dag Klaveness (1913–1986).

== See also ==
- Fearnley (Norwegian family)
