= Institute of Theoretical Astrophysics =

Department of the University of Oslo

- Institutt for teoretisk astrofysikk
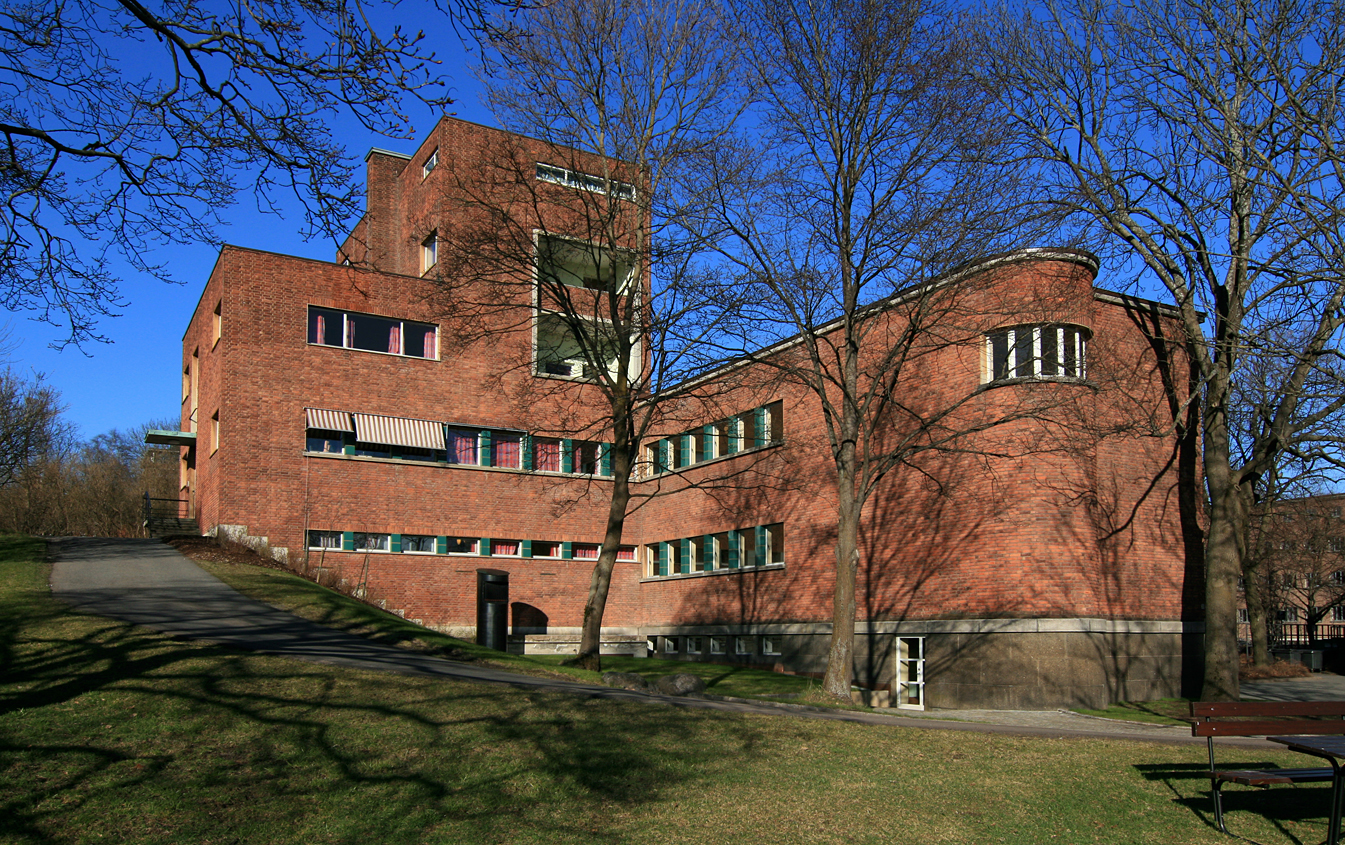
- The institute is located in Svein Rosselands hus at Blindern
- Abbreviation: ITA
- Formation: 1833 (as the Observatory), 1934 (as ITA)
- Founders: Christopher Hansteen (the Observatory), Svein Rosseland (ITA)
- Location: Sem Sælands vei 13, 0371 Oslo, Norway
- Coordinates: 59.9386°N 10.7179°E
- Leader: Per Barth Lilje
- Parent organization: University of Oslo
- Staff: ~65 (including 15 professors). ~20 Msc students (2019)
- Website: astro.uio.no
- Formerly called: 'Observatoriet' (lit. 'The Observatory')

The Institute of Theoretical Astrophysics (Norwegian: Institutt for teoretisk astrofysikk, abbreviated ITA) is a research and teaching institute dedicated to astronomy, astrophysics and solar physics located at Blindern in Oslo, Norway. It is a department of The Faculty of Mathematics and Natural Sciences at the University of Oslo. It was founded in its current form by Svein Rosseland with funding from the Rockefeller Foundation in 1934, and was the first of its kind in the world when it opened. Prior to that, it existed as the University Observatory which was created in 1833. It thus is one of the university's oldest institutions. As of 2019, it houses research groups in cosmology, extragalactic astronomy, and The Rosseland Centre for Solar Physics, a Norwegian Centre of Excellence.

== History ==
=== The observatory ===
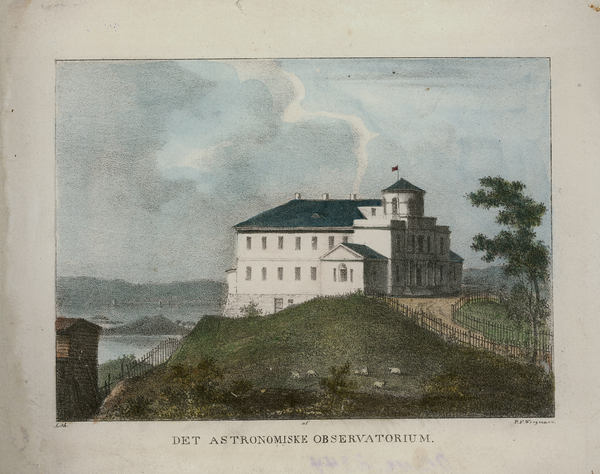
The University Observatory overlooking Oslofjorden in 1837

Prior to 1934, the university's astronomy efforts revolved around the University Observatory (Norwegian: Universitetsobservatoriet, abbreviated Observatoriet, lit. the Observatory) located downtown Oslo. The first observation facilities were provided in 1815 to the newly appointed professor Christopher Hansteen of the recently established Royal Frederick University (which was renamed the University of Oslo in 1939) in an octagonal shack at Akershus Festning, Christiania. Construction began in 1831 on a larger observatory which also could house Hansteen and his family. At its completion in 1833 it became the first building to have been erected by the university.

=== An Institute of Theoretical Astrophysics ===
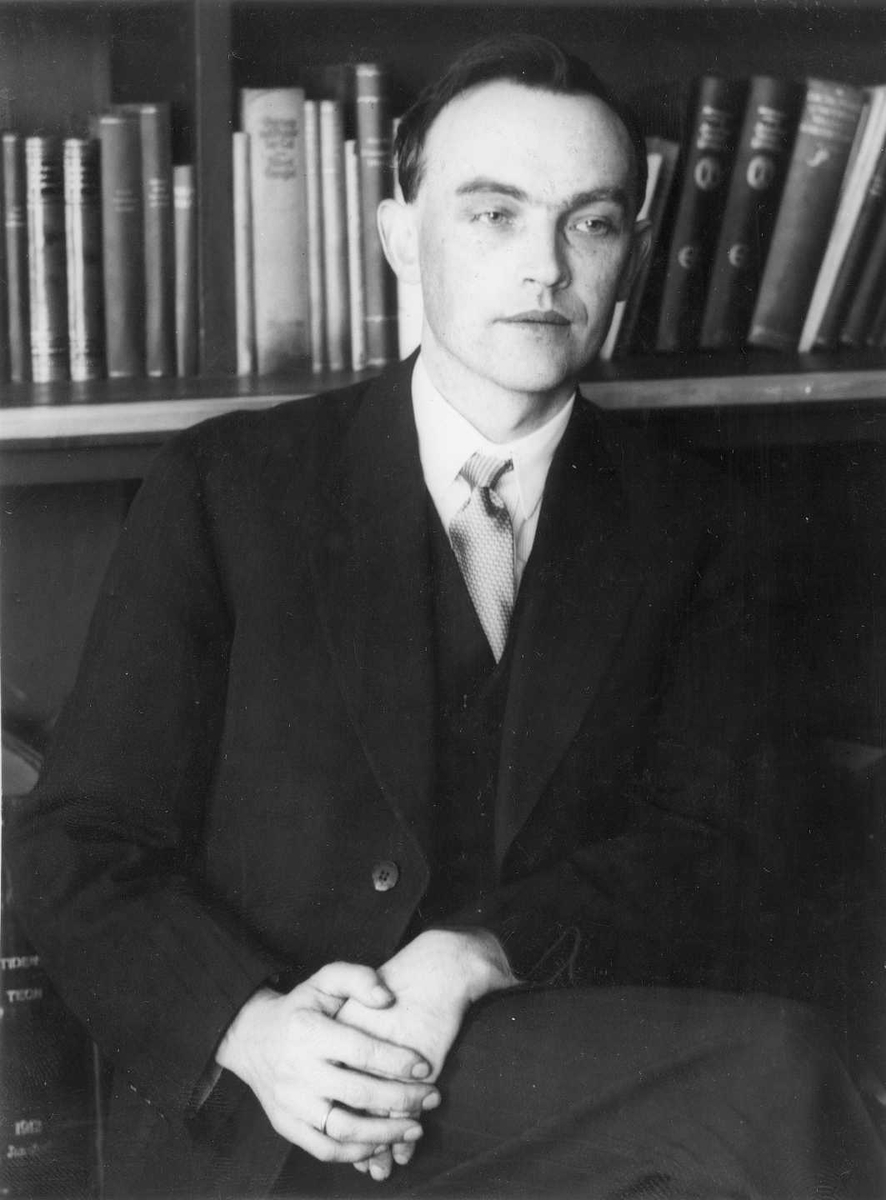
Svein Rosseland, about 1935

The Observatory's final director, professor Svein Rosseland (appointed in 1928) did not consider its future to be promising. In a letter to a colleague, he wrote,

I expect that the remainder of my life here will be an infinite struggle to raise this tiny observatory without the slightest chance of achieving anything of scientific value.

— Svein Rosseland (transl.)

He visited the Harvard College Observatory in 1929, and accepted a professorship there. However, rector Sem Sæland of the University of Oslo saw this as a great loss, as Rosseland already had become an internationally renowned scientist at the time. Sæland coordinated a political effort in which Rosseland was offered to manage an astronomical fund provided by the state, prospects of new university facilities, and was promised a general renovation of the observatory. Rosseland accepted, and returned to Oslo in 1930. He then contacted Niels Bohr in Copenhagen who recently had founded the Institute of Theoretical Physics for inspiration and his level plans. Rosseland concluded that the director should reside at the institute. In his opinion, work did not comply with working hours, and the director should always be available. An architectural competition was announced, and the winning design was sent to the Rockefeller Foundation. His proposal of an institute of theoretical astrophysics did not exist elsewhere in the world at the time. The foundation replied 15 April 1931, granting him 105,000 dollars to erect the institute and 15,000 dollars to obtain scientific equipment.

The architectural firm of Finn Bryn and Johan Fredrik Ellefsen designed the building for Rosseland at Blindern campus in Oslo. It opened 1 July 1934 and was named Svein Rosselands hus (lit. the house of Svein Rosseland). The building is a striking example of functionalism, unlike the nearby building for physics and chemistry which originally was designed in neoclassical style. Both scientists and the library were moved from the observatory to the new premises. The two first floors and the basement were purposed for research and teaching, and Rosseland himself resided in the upper three floors. A plaque honoring the Rockefeller Foundation can be found near the entrance.

In the early days, the institute housed Rosseland himself, his assistant Gunnar Randers, two of the founders of modern meteorology: retired Norwegian dean of science Vilhelm Bjerknes and professor Halvor Solberg, as well as Carl Størmer, a mathematics professor who also studied the northern lights. Rosseland's international recognition led to visits from prominent scientists such as Martin Schwarzschild.

=== Instruments, observatories, and telescopes ===
The institute housed the Oslo Analyzer in its basement between 1934 and 1954. It was the most powerful differential analyzer in the world for four years after its creation. Key pieces were buried in the garden behind the institute during WW2 to prevent the machine from being used by the nazis.

The institute had its own solar observatory outside Oslo between 1954 and 1987, the Harestua Solar Observatory. It has been used for science educational purposes after ceasing to exist as a research facility. A subsequent telescope was proposed, the Large European Solar Telescope. After a completion of an initial scientific requirement analysis in 1982, a legal body was formed in 1983. The telescope was however never realized. Solar physicists at ITA have routinely been using the Swedish Solar Telescope since it saw first light in 2002.

The institute contributed to, and made use of, the solar imager High Resolution Telescope and Spectrograph of the Naval Research Laboratory which was launched on rockets and flew once with the Space Shuttle between 1975 and 1985.

The space-borne Solar and Heliospheric Observatory was launched in 1995. The institute provided the ground test system and computers.

In 1988, the Nordic Optical Telescope at La Palma was opened. It was co-funded by Norway and is used by astronomers at ITA.

The works of the former celestial mechanics research group at the institute were instrumental in determining the path ESA's Rosetta spacecraft would take when approaching its target, the comet 67P/Churyumov–Gerasimenko in 2014.

The institute lead the Norwegian contributions to the Planck mission of ESA until its final release of results in 2018. Scientists at the institute were instrumental in analyzing the resulting maps of the cosmic microwave background (CMB).

=== A Center of Excellence ===
The solar physics group at the institute was granted status as a Norwegian Centre of Excellence in 2017 for the period 2017–2027 under the direction of Mats Carlsson.

=== Directors ===
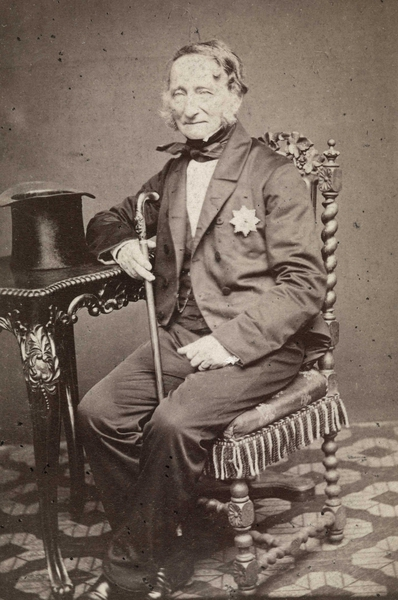
Christopher Hansteen in the 1870s

- Christopher Hansteen (1834–1861)
- Carl Frederik Fearnley (1861–1890)
- Hans Geelmuyden (1890–1919)
- Jens Fredrik Schroeter (1919–1927)
- Svein Rosseland (1928–35 at the observatory, 1935–1965 at ITA)
- Mats Carlsson (1997–2003 (?))
- Per Barth Lilje (2003–2012)
- Viggo Hansteen (2013–2017)
- Per Barth Lilje (2017–)

== Research ==
The institute is engaged in various fields of theoretical, observational and numerical astrophysics.

The cosmology group is engaged in analysis of data from cosmic microwave background-related experiments such as CORE, GreenPol, LiteBIRD, PASIPHAE, QUIET and SPIDER. The group is also researching the nature of the cosmological accelerating expansion and the nature of dark matter, both through theoretical and numerical investigations into modifying general relativity as well as the future Euclid mission of ESA.

The extragalactic astronomy group is organized under the cosmology group. Its scientists use both simulations of galaxy formations, radiative transfer simulations, and observations of gravitationally lensed galaxies to understand and investigate the Universe beyond our own galaxy. Observations are carried out with the Hubble Space Telescope and the Nordic Optical Telescope among others. The group is also a key player in the COMAP carbon monoxide intensity mapping experiment.

The Rosseland Centre for Solar Physics combines theory, numerics and observations to provide insights into the solar atmosphere. It is regarded as one of the world's foremost solar physics research institutions. With an allocated amount of 115 million CPU hours in 2018, it also is the most data intensive research group in Norway. The institute hosts the European data center for data from the Hinode satellite. It has an in-house developed 3D numerical model of the solar atmosphere called Bifrost. Besides using the Swedish Solar Telescope and Hinode for solar observations, the group also makes use of the space-borne Interface Region Imaging Spectrograph (IRIS), the Solar Dynamics Observatory as well as the ground-based Swedish Solar Telescope (SST) and the Atacama Large Millimeter Array (ALMA).

== The Almanac of Norway ==
The official almanac of Norway has been published since 1644. After the dissolution of the Denmark-Norway union in 1814, the almanac has been edited in Norway. In 1814, it was edited by the Danish astronomer Thomas Bugge. Christopher Hansteen became editor in 1815 and remained so until 1862. Directors and astronomers at the Observatory and ITA have been editing it ever since.
