= Fearnley (Norwegian family) =

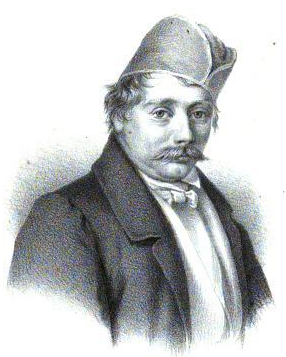
Romantic painter Thomas Fearnley

Fearnley (Norwegian pronunciation: [ˈfæːɳlɪ]) is a Norwegian family of shipping magnates. The family is of English origin, originating in Heckmondwike in Yorkshire. The merchant Thomas Fearnley (1729–1798) migrated from Hull in England to Frederikshald in Norway in 1753. His son, merchant Thomas Fearnley (1768–1834), was married to Maren Sophie Paus (1782–1838). They were the parents of romantic painter Thomas Fearnley and astronomer Carl Frederik Fearnley.

The painter Thomas Fearnley's only child was shipping magnate Thomas Fearnley (1841–1927), who was the father of shipping magnate Thomas Fearnley (1880–1961) and land owner N. O. Young Fearnley. The Astrup Fearnley Museum of Modern Art was founded by their descendants in 1993.

== Literature ==
- Sigurd Engelstad, Slekten Fearnley i Norge 1753-1967, Oslo 1954
- Hans Cappelen: Norske Slektsvåpen (Norwegian Family Coats of Arms) with an English Summary, Oslo 1969, p. 96
