= Astrophysics =

Subfield of astronomy

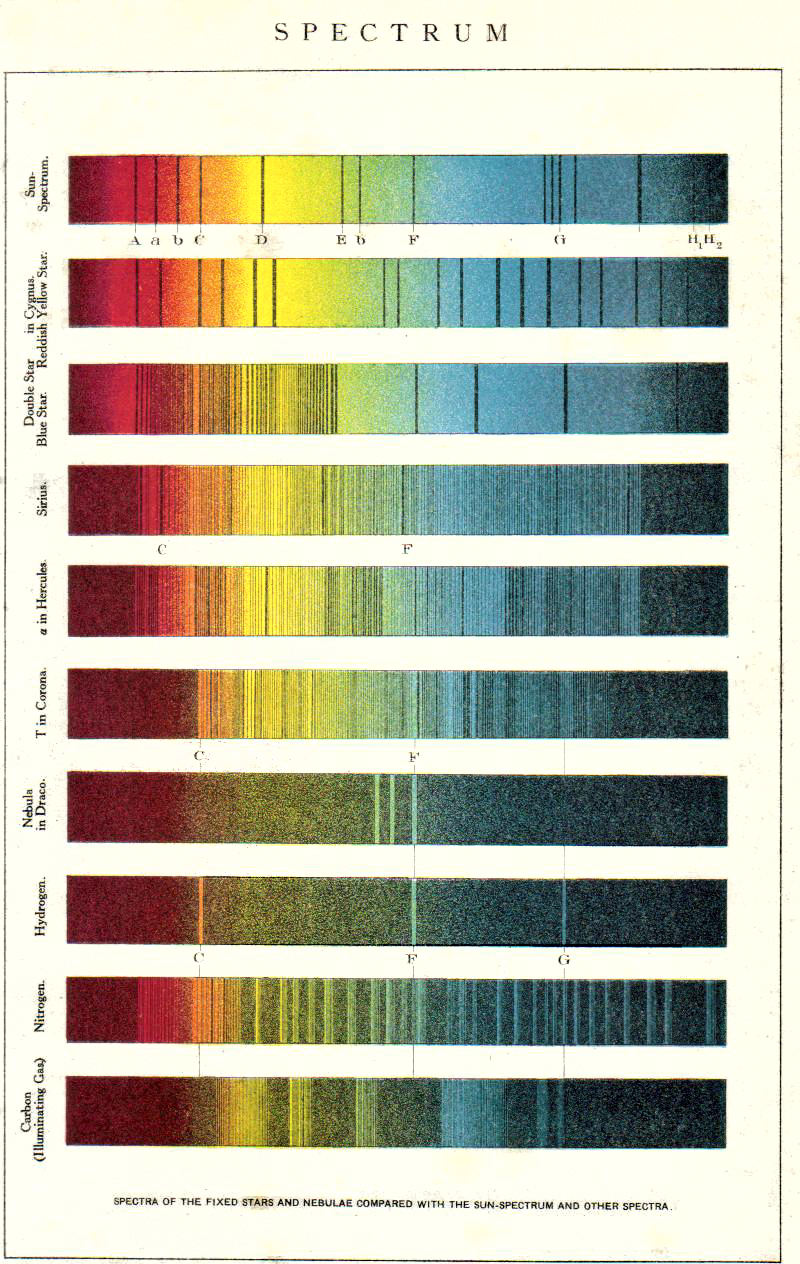
Early 1900s comparison of elemental, solar, and stellar spectra

Astrophysics is a science that applies the methods and principles of physics and chemistry in the study of astronomical objects and phenomena including the universe. As one of the founders of the discipline, James Keeler, said, astrophysics "seeks to ascertain the nature of the heavenly bodies, rather than their positions or motions in space—what they are, rather than where they are", which is studied in celestial mechanics. Astrophysics is also used when designing and plotting courses for spacecraft.

Among the subjects studied are the Sun (solar physics), other stars, galaxies, extrasolar planets, the interstellar medium, and the cosmic microwave background. Emissions from these objects are examined across all parts of the electromagnetic spectrum, and the properties examined include luminosity, density, temperature, and chemical composition. Because astrophysics is a very broad subject, astrophysicists apply concepts and methods from many disciplines of physics, including classical mechanics, electromagnetism, statistical mechanics, thermodynamics, quantum mechanics, relativity, nuclear and particle physics, and atomic and molecular physics.

In practice, modern astronomical research often involves substantial work in the realms of theoretical and observational physics. Some areas of study for astrophysicists include the properties of dark matter, dark energy, black holes, and other celestial bodies; and the origin and ultimate fate of the universe. Topics also studied by theoretical astrophysicists include Solar System formation and evolution; stellar dynamics and evolution; galaxy formation and evolution; magnetohydrodynamics; large-scale structure of matter in the universe; cosmic rays; general relativity, special relativity, and quantum and physical cosmology (the physical study of the largest-scale structures of the universe), including string cosmology and astroparticle physics.

== History ==
Astronomy is an ancient science, long separated from the study of terrestrial physics. In the Aristotelian worldview, bodies in the sky appeared to be unchanging spheres whose only motion was uniform motion in a circle, while the earthly world was the realm which underwent growth and decay and in which natural motion was in a straight line and ended when the moving object reached its goal. Consequently, it was held that the celestial region was made of a fundamentally different kind of matter from that found in the terrestrial sphere; either Fire as maintained by Plato, or Aether as maintained by Aristotle. During the 17th century, natural philosophers such as Galileo, Descartes, and Newton began to maintain that the celestial and terrestrial regions were made of similar kinds of material and were subject to the same natural laws. Their challenge was that the tools had not yet been invented with which to prove these assertions.

For much of the nineteenth century, astronomical research was focused on the routine work of measuring the positions and computing the motions of astronomical objects. A new astronomy, soon to be called astrophysics, began to emerge when William Hyde Wollaston and Joseph von Fraunhofer independently discovered that, when decomposing the light from the Sun, a multitude of dark lines (regions where there was less or no light) were observed in the spectrum. By 1860 the physicist, Gustav Kirchhoff, and the chemist, Robert Bunsen, had demonstrated that the dark lines in the solar spectrum corresponded to bright lines in the spectra of known gases, specific lines corresponding to unique chemical elements. Kirchhoff deduced that the dark lines in the solar spectrum are caused by absorption by chemical elements in the Solar atmosphere. In this way it was proved that the chemical elements found in the Sun and stars were also found on Earth.

Among those who extended the study of solar and stellar spectra was Norman Lockyer, who in 1868 detected radiant, as well as dark lines in solar spectra. Working with chemist Edward Frankland to investigate the spectra of elements at various temperatures and pressures, he could not associate a yellow line in the solar spectrum with any known elements. He thus claimed the line represented a new element, which was called helium, after the Greek Helios, the Sun personified.

In 1885, Edward C. Pickering undertook an ambitious program of stellar spectral classification at Harvard College Observatory, in which a team of woman computers, notably Williamina Fleming, Antonia Maury, and Annie Jump Cannon, classified the spectra recorded on photographic plates. By 1890, a catalog of over 10,000 stars had been prepared that grouped them into thirteen spectral types. Following Pickering's vision, by 1924 Cannon expanded the catalog to nine volumes and over a quarter of a million stars, developing the Harvard Classification Scheme which was accepted for worldwide use in 1922.

In 1895, George Ellery Hale and James E. Keeler, along with a group of ten associate editors from Europe and the United States, established The Astrophysical Journal: An International Review of Spectroscopy and Astronomical Physics. It was intended that the journal would fill the gap between journals in astronomy and physics, providing a venue for publication of articles on astronomical applications of the spectroscope; on laboratory research closely allied to astronomical physics, including wavelength determinations of metallic and gaseous spectra and experiments on radiation and absorption; on theories of the Sun, Moon, planets, comets, meteors, and nebulae; and on instrumentation for telescopes and laboratories.

Around 1920, following the discovery of the Hertzsprung–Russell diagram still used as the basis for classifying stars and their evolution, Arthur Eddington anticipated the discovery and mechanism of nuclear fusion processes in stars, in his paper The Internal Constitution of the Stars. At that time, the source of stellar energy was a complete mystery; Eddington correctly speculated that the source was fusion of hydrogen into helium, liberating enormous energy according to Einstein's equation E = mc^{2}. This was a particularly remarkable development since at that time fusion and thermonuclear energy, and even that stars are largely composed of hydrogen (see metallicity), had not yet been discovered.

In 1925 Cecilia Helena Payne (later Cecilia Payne-Gaposchkin) wrote an influential doctoral dissertation at Radcliffe College, in which she applied Saha's ionization theory to stellar atmospheres to relate the spectral classes to the temperature of stars. Most significantly, she discovered that hydrogen and helium were the principal components of stars, not the composition of Earth. Despite Eddington's suggestion, discovery was so unexpected that her dissertation readers (including Russell) convinced her to modify the conclusion before publication. However, later research confirmed her discovery.

By the end of the 20th century, studies of astronomical spectra had expanded to cover wavelengths extending from radio waves through optical, x-ray, and gamma wavelengths. In the 21st century, it further expanded to include observations based on gravitational waves.

== Observational astrophysics ==
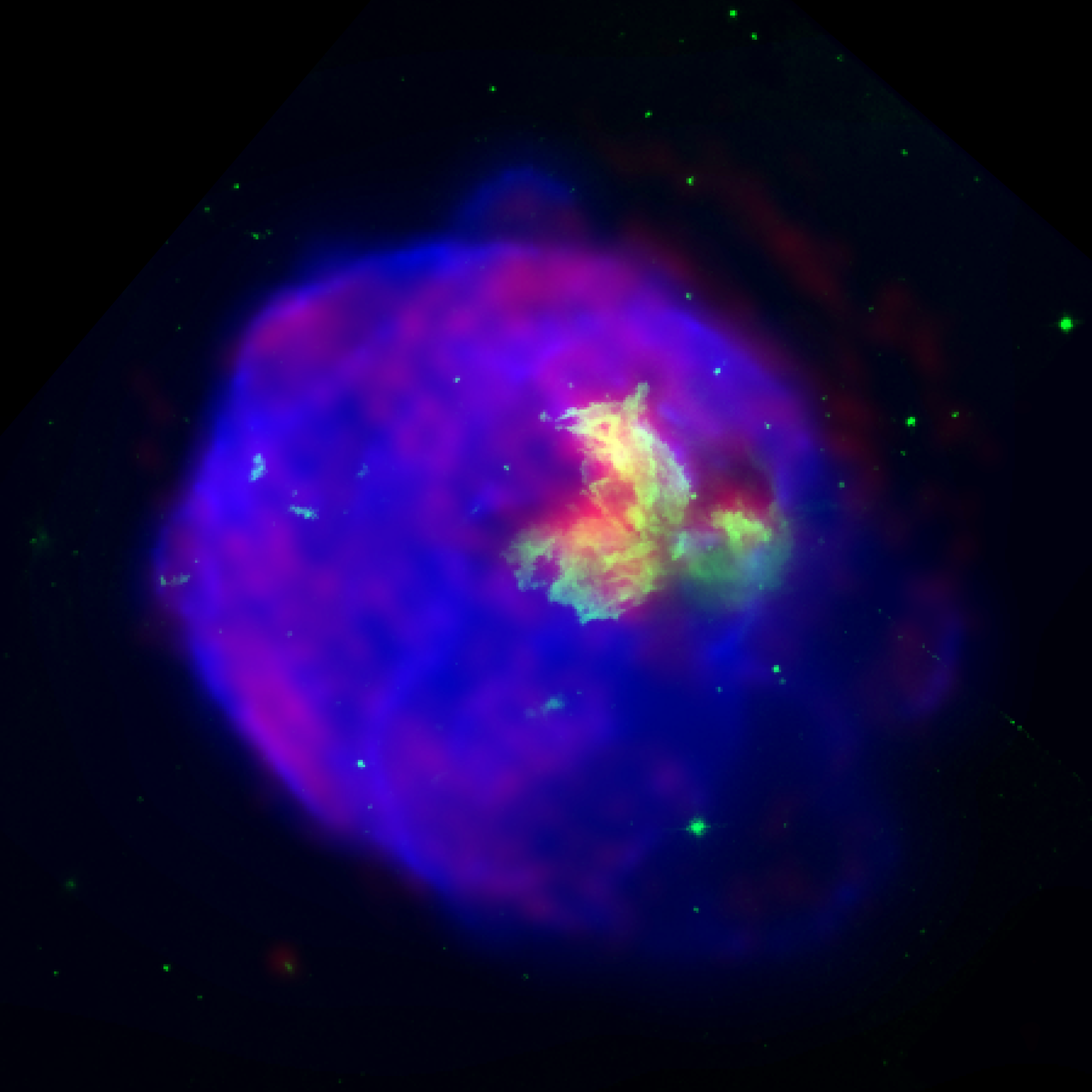
Supernova remnant LMC N 63A imaged in x-ray (blue), optical (green) and radio (red) wavelengths. The X-ray glow is from material heated to about ten million degrees Celsius by a shock wave generated by the supernova explosion.

Observational astronomy is a division of the astronomical science that is concerned with recording and interpreting data, in contrast with theoretical astrophysics, which is mainly concerned with finding out the measurable implications of physical models. It is the practice of observing celestial objects by using telescopes and other astronomical apparatus.

Most astrophysical observations are made using the electromagnetic spectrum.

- Radio astronomy studies radiation with a wavelength greater than a few millimeters. Example areas of study are radio waves, usually emitted by cold objects such as interstellar gas and dust clouds; the cosmic microwave background radiation which is the redshifted light from the Big Bang; pulsars, which were first detected at microwave frequencies. The study of these waves requires very large radio telescopes.
- Infrared astronomy studies radiation with a wavelength that is too long to be visible to the naked eye but is shorter than radio waves. Infrared observations are usually made with telescopes similar to the familiar optical telescopes. Objects colder than stars (such as planets) are normally studied at infrared frequencies.
- Optical astronomy was the earliest kind of astronomy. Telescopes paired with a charge-coupled device or spectroscopes are the most common instruments used. The Earth's atmosphere interferes somewhat with optical observations, so adaptive optics and space telescopes are used to obtain the highest possible image quality. In this wavelength range, stars are highly visible, and many chemical spectra can be observed to study the chemical composition of stars, galaxies, and nebulae.
- Ultraviolet, X-ray and gamma ray astronomy study very energetic processes such as binary pulsars, black holes, magnetars, and many others. These kinds of radiation do not penetrate the Earth's atmosphere well. There are two methods in use to observe this part of the electromagnetic spectrum—space-based telescopes and ground-based imaging air Cherenkov telescopes (IACT). Examples of Observatories of the first type are RXTE, the Chandra X-ray Observatory and the Compton Gamma Ray Observatory. Examples of IACTs are the High Energy Stereoscopic System (H.E.S.S.) and the MAGIC telescope.

Other than electromagnetic radiation, few things may be observed from the Earth that originate from great distances. A few gravitational wave observatories have been constructed, but gravitational waves are extremely difficult to detect. Neutrino observatories have also been built, primarily to study the Sun. Cosmic rays consisting of very high-energy particles can be observed hitting the Earth's atmosphere.

Observations can also vary in their time scale. Most optical observations take minutes to hours, so phenomena that change faster than this cannot readily be observed. However, historical data on some objects is available, spanning centuries or millennia. On the other hand, radio observations may look at events on a millisecond timescale (millisecond pulsars) or combine years of data (pulsar deceleration studies). The information obtained from these different timescales is very different.

The study of the Sun has a special place in observational astrophysics. Due to the tremendous distance of all other stars, the Sun can be observed in a kind of detail unparalleled by any other star. Understanding the Sun serves as a guide to understanding of other stars.

The topic of how stars change, or stellar evolution, is often modeled by placing the varieties of star types in their respective positions on the Hertzsprung–Russell diagram, which can be viewed as representing the state of a stellar object, from birth to destruction.

== Theoretical astrophysics ==
Theoretical astrophysicists use a wide variety of tools which include analytical models (for example, polytropes to approximate the behaviors of a star) and computational numerical simulations. Each has some advantages. Analytical models of a process are generally better for giving insight into the heart of what is going on. Numerical models can reveal the existence of phenomena and effects that would otherwise not be seen.

Theorists in astrophysics endeavor to create theoretical models and figure out the observational consequences of those models. This helps allow observers to look for data that can refute a model or help in choosing between several alternate or conflicting models.

Theorists also try to generate or modify models to take into account new data. In the case of an inconsistency, the general tendency is to try to make minimal modifications to the model to fit the data. In some cases, a large amount of inconsistent data over time may lead to total abandonment of a model.

Topics studied by theoretical astrophysicists include stellar dynamics and evolution; galaxy formation and evolution; magnetohydrodynamics; large-scale structure of matter in the universe; origin of cosmic rays; general relativity and physical cosmology, including string cosmology and astroparticle physics. Relativistic astrophysics serves as a tool to gauge the properties of large-scale structures for which gravitation plays a significant role in physical phenomena investigated and as the basis for black hole physics and the study of gravitational waves.

Some widely accepted and studied theories and models in astrophysics, now included in the Lambda-CDM model, are the Big Bang, cosmic inflation, dark matter, dark energy and fundamental theories of physics.

=== History and theoretical astronomy ===
Historically, when astronomy was limited by astrometry and observational astronomy, the field of celestial mechanics (CM) was referred to as theoretical astronomy. Hipparchus made foundational contributions to the field through the development of a numerical observation geometry system. However, Isaac Newton is considered the founder of the field through his development of calculus and the law of universal gravitation. The majority of the field is based on Kepler's laws of planetary motion. Theodor von Oppolzer expanded the work on CM and geodetic astronomy within the field at the University of Vienna in the late 19th century. Soon after the discovery of Cepheid variable stars, theorists shifted from CM and geodesy to the development of theoretical mechanisms for the composition and internal physics of stars.

The field then expanded into other areas such as cosmology, plasma physics, and hydrodynamics. In Sweden in the early 1930s, Svein Rosseland funded the Institute of Theoretical Astrophysics, which opened in 1934, to advance what he said had developed into a separate science. In 1966, a small group of astronomers led by Fred Hoyle established the Institute of Theoretical Astronomy at the University of Cambridge to allow theorists to focus entirely on computational research without any teaching responsibilities. Despite that theoretical astronomy and astrophysics were being used interchangeably throughout the 20th century, university courses titled "theoretical astronomy" exclusively taught CM. In 1985, the University of Virginia, which had been home to the largest refractor in the world and used primarily by the United States Naval Observatory, opened the Virginia Institute of Theoretical Astronomy to host research in both theoretical astronomy and astrophysics.

Modern theoretical astronomy is the use of mathematical and computational tools to model and predict the motions of astronomical objects. In astronomy curriculum, theoretical astronomy is used in conjunction with observational techniques, and unpaired, the field would not be considered a science. It is foundational in the field of planetary science.

== Popularization ==
The roots of astrophysics can be found in the seventeenth century emergence of a unified physics, in which the same laws applied to the celestial and terrestrial realms. There were scientists who were qualified in both physics and astronomy who laid the firm foundation for the current science of astrophysics. In modern times, students continue to be drawn to astrophysics due to its popularization by the Royal Astronomical Society and notable educators such as prominent professors Lawrence Krauss, Subrahmanyan Chandrasekhar, Stephen Hawking, Hubert Reeves, Carl Sagan and Patrick Moore. The efforts of the early, late, and present scientists continue to attract young people to study the history and science of astrophysics. The television sitcom show The Big Bang Theory popularized the field of astrophysics with the general public, and featured some well known scientists like Stephen Hawking and Neil deGrasse Tyson.

== See also ==
- Astrochemistry – Study of molecules in the Universe and their reactions
- Astronomical observatories
- Astronomical spectroscopy – Measurement of electromagnetic radiation for astronomy
- Astroparticle physics – Branch of particle physics
- Gravitational-wave astronomy – Branch of astronomy using gravitational waves
- Hertzsprung–Russell diagram – Scatter plot of stars showing the relationship of luminosity to stellar classification
- High-energy astronomy – Study of astronomical objects that release highly energetic electromagnetic radiation
- Important publications in astrophysics
- List of astronomers – (includes astrophysicists)
- Neutrino astronomy – Observing low-mass stellar particles
- Timeline of gravitational physics and relativity
- Timeline of knowledge about galaxies, clusters of galaxies, and large-scale structure
- Timeline of white dwarfs, neutron stars, and supernovae – Chronological list of developments in knowledge and records
