= Kjell Torriset =

Norwegian painter and graphic artist

- Born: 7 May 1950 (age 76); Ålesund, Norway
- Occupations: Painter and printmaker

Kjell Torriset (born 7 May 1950) is a Norwegian painter and graphic artist. He was born in Ålesund. He is represented in several public art collections in Norway. He has been member of the board of the Astrup Fearnley Museum of Modern Art and of Oslo Kunstforening. In 1992 he was awarded the city of Ålesund's art prize.

Torriset designed the sets and costumes for the four operas of Wagner's Ring Cycle at Longborough Festival Opera between 2007 and 2012.
