= Vibeke Tandberg =

Norwegian photographer

Vibeke Tandberg (born 1967) is a Norwegian photographer known for using herself as the subject of her work. In 2002 she had a solo exhibition at C/O Berlin. In 2003 she created a series of photographs entitled "Undo" consisting of self-portraits taken while she was pregnant. In 2017 Tandberg was the recipient of a Lorck Schive Kunstpris (Lorck Schive Art Prize). In 2018 her work was included in the show Journeys with “the Waste Land” at the Turner Contemporary gallery.

Her work is in The Frances Young Tang Teaching Museum and Art Gallery, the Museum of Modern Art, the National Gallery of Art, the Nasjonalmuseet for kunst, and the National Museum of Women in the Arts (NMWA)
