= Nils Ebbessøn Astrup =

Norwegian shipowner

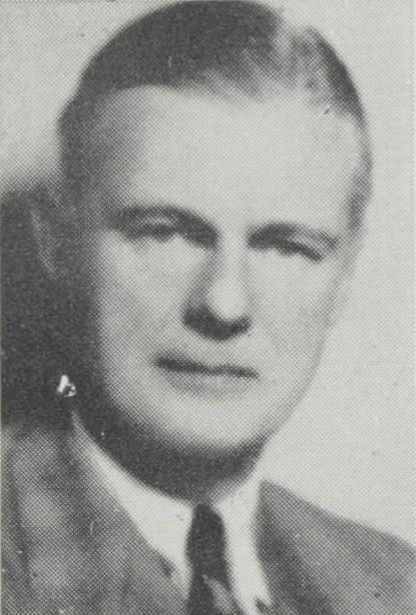
- Born: 7 June 1901; Kristiania, Norway
- Died: 29 September 1972 (aged 71); Oslo
- Occupation: Ship owner
- Children: Hans Rasmus Astrup
- Relatives: Hans Rasmus Astrup (grandfather)

Nils Ebbessøn Astrup (7 June 1901 – 29 September 1972) was a Norwegian ship owner.

== Personal life ==
Astrup was the son of colonel Ebbe Carsten Morten Astrup and Cecilie Fearnley, and a grandson of Hans Rasmus Astrup. He married Hedevig Stang in 1925, and they were the parents of ship broker Hans Rasmus Astrup.

== Career ==
Astrup was a co-owner of the shipping company Fearnley & Eger. He served as president of the Norwegian Shipowners' Association from 1961 to 1963, having been vice president first 1940–1945 and then from 1956. From 1966 to 1969 he was vice president of the International Chamber of Shipping. He was also a board member of Det Norske Luftfartselskap.

He was decorated Commander of the Order of St. Olav in 1969.
