= Per Barth Lilje =

Norwegian astronomer

Per Vidar Barth Lilje (born 11 March 1957) is a Norwegian astronomer.

He was born in Tønsberg. He took his Ph.D. at the University of Cambridge in 1988, and worked at the Nordic Institute for Theoretical Physics from 1989 to 1992. He became professor at the University of Oslo in 1993, and previously headed the Institute of Theoretical Astrophysics there. His fields are cosmology and extragalactic astronomy. In 2017 he was inducted into the Norwegian Academy of Science and Letters.
