= Thomas Fearnley (shipping magnate, born 1880) =

Norwegian shipping magnate, sports executive and philanthropist

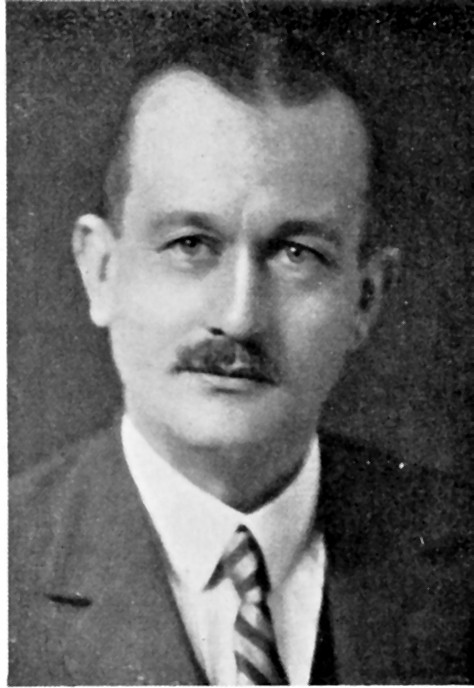
Thomas Fearnley

Thomas Fearnley (16 January 1880 – 10 January 1961) was a Norwegian shipping magnate, sports executive and philanthropist. He was a prominent figure in Norwegian shipping in the first half of the 20th century.

== Biography ==
Fearnley was born at Kristiania (now Oslo), Norway. He was the son of shipping magnate Thomas Nicolay Fearnley (1841–1927) and his wife Elisabeth Young (1854–1932). He was a member of the Fearnley family and was the grandson of romantic painter Thomas Fearnley and paternal grandnephew of professor Carl Frederik Fearnley (1818-1890). He was the maternal great-grandson of Nicolai Andresen (1781–1861) founder of Andresens Bank A/S. His brother N. O. Young Fearnley (1881–1961) was a businessman and landowner. His sister Cecilie Fearnley (1878–1902) was married to Ebbe Carsten Morten Astrup (1876–1955).

He attended Kristiania Cathedral School and trading school in Leipzig in 1896 from 1898. In 1901, he was also employed at the partnership of Fearnley & Eger in Christiania, the shipping company founded by his father in 1869. He became co-owner in 1908. He was Chief Executive Officer in 1921. He made his comamy one of the country's leading shipping companies, while at the same time being a key player in national shipowners' cooperation. Fearnley was vice-chairman of Kristiania Shipowners Association 1910-12. He became a member of the Central Board of the Norwegian Shipowners Association in 1912, serving as Vice President 1915-18 and President 1918-21. In 1931, his nephew Nils Ebbessøn Astrup (1901-1972) entered the firm as a co-owner of Fearnley & Astrup (now Astrup Fearnley Group). In 1941, Fearnley pulled out of the active management of Fearnley & Astrup.

Fearnley was a co-founder of the gentlemen's skiing club SK Fram in 1889, and received honorary chairmanship. In 1909 he took the initiative for the formation of the Norwegian Lawn Tennis Association (Norges Tennisforbund). He was among the founders of the Norwegian Jockey Club (Norsk Jockeyklub) in 1932 and was the president of the club until 1940. From 1927 to 1950, he was the permanent Norwegian member of the International Olympic Committee (IOC). Fearnley became Honorary Member of the IOC 1951. In 1950, he founded the Fearnley Cup to honor an amateur sport club or a local amateur sport association based upon meritorious achievement in the service of the Olympic Movement. He originated the Fearnley Olympic Award in connection with the 1952 Winter Olympics in Oslo. The award is given for outstanding achievements by a Norwegian Olympic participant.

== Personal life ==
In 1911, he married Benedicte Rustad (1886–1976). Thomas Fearnley received a number of Norwegian and foreign orders. In 1921, he was appointed a Knight 1st grade in the Order of St. Olav and in 1960 was awarded the Commander Cross. He was awarded the Order of the Dannebrog, Order of Vasa, Order of the British Empire and the French Legion of Honour.
