= Thomas Fearnley =

Norwegian painter (1802–1842)

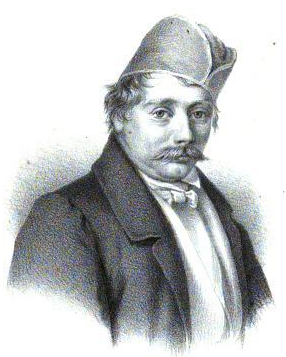
Thomas Fearnley

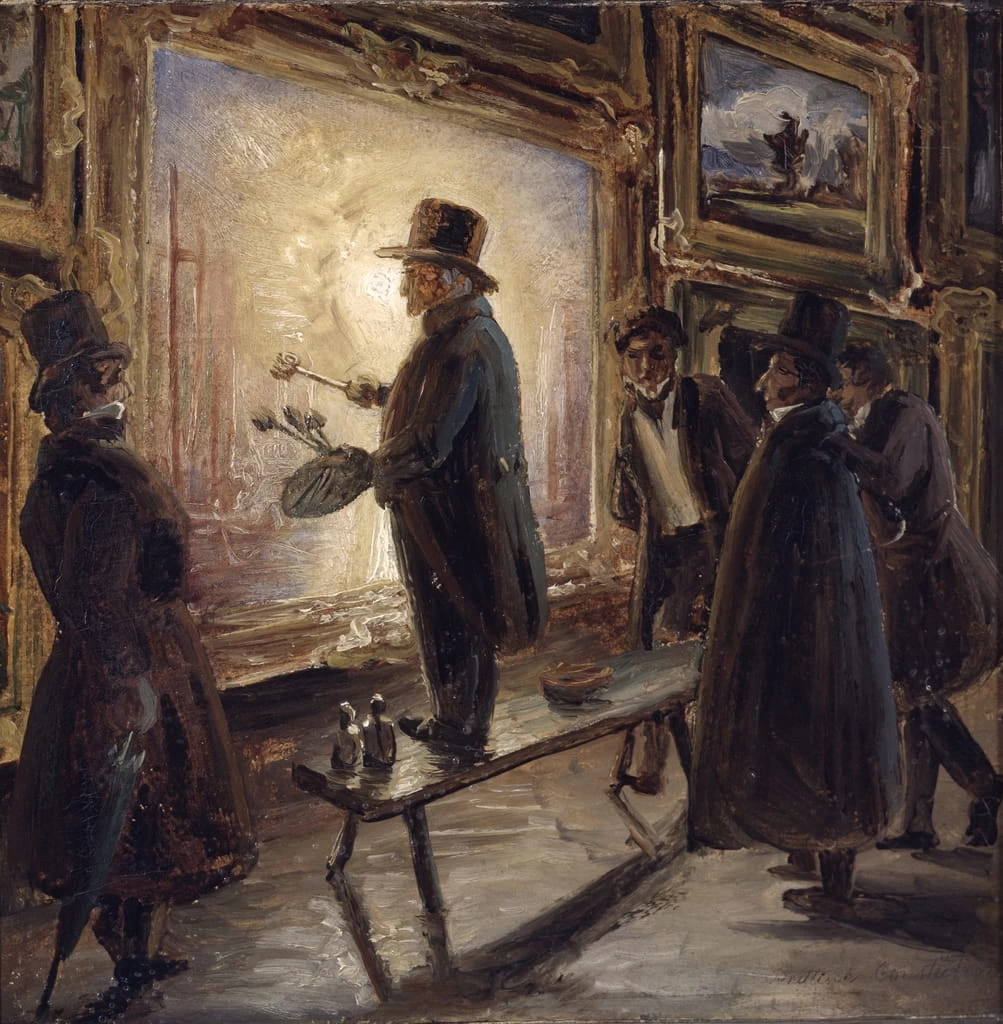
During a study trip to London in 1837, Fearnley painted J. M. W. Turner painting

Thomas Fearnley (Norwegian pronunciation: [ˈfæːɳlɪ], 27 December 1802 – 16 January 1842) was a Norwegian romantic painter, a pupil of Johan Christian Dahl and a leading representative of Norwegian romantic nationalism in painting. His son Thomas Fearnley (1841–1927) founded the Fearnley dynasty of shipping magnates.

== Background ==
Thomas Fearnley was born in Frederikshald (now Halden) in Østfold, Norway. He was the son of merchant Thomas Fearnley (1768–1834) and Maren Sophie Paus (1782–1838). He was the brother of astronomer and professor Carl Frederik Fearnley (1818–1890). Fearnley's grandfather, merchant Thomas Fearnley (1729–1798), immigrated from Yorkshire, England to Frederikshald, Norway in 1753. His mother was the daughter of a wealthy merchant who belonged to the Paus family, a prominent family from Telemark.

In 1840, he married Cecilia Catharine Andresen (1817–1888). She was the daughter of his benefactor, banker Nicolai Andresen (1781–1861), who founded what became the Andresen Bank, one of Norway's largest commercial banks of its time. In the autumn of 1841, the couple went to Amsterdam for the birth of their only child, Thomas Nicolay Fearnley (1841–1927), who became a Norwegian shipping magnate. His grandsons were shipping magnate Thomas Fearnley (1880–1961) and land owner N. O. Young Fearnley. His descendants founded the Astrup Fearnley Museum of Modern Art in 1993.

== Career ==
Thomas Fearnley attended National Cadet Corps (Landkadettkorpset) from 1814 to 1819. He was a student of the Norwegian National Academy of Craft and Art Industry (Den kongelige Tegneskole) (1819–1821), Art Academy (Kunstakadamie) in Copenhagen (1821–1823) and the Art Academy (Konstakadamien) in Stockholm (1823–27) under Carl Johan Fahlcrantz.

Fearnley left Copenhagen bound for Stockholm in the autumn of 1823 to complete a painting commissioned by Crown Prince Oscar of Norway and Sweden. He received several orders from the Swedish royal family and from other members of the royal court including Swedish Count Gustaf Trolle-Bonde. He conducted study tours in Norway (1824-1826), at which time he met Johan Christian Dahl in Sogn. After another stay in Copenhagen from 1827 to 1828 and a new Norwegian trip in the autumn of 1828, he went to Germany and was a student of Dahl in Dresden (1829–1830) as well as befriending the German painter Joseph Petzl and the German-Danish painter Friedrich Bernhard Westphal. He lived in Munich (1830–32).

Fearnley traveled extensively in the 1830s, visiting Munich, Paris, London, Hull and the English Lake district. During September 1832, he went from Venice to Rome and visited Sicily the following summer. He mostly painted in small towns south of Naples: Castellammare, Amalfi, Sorrento, Capri and in Switzerland: Meiringen, Grindelwald. He went to Paris in the summer of 1835 and visited London the next year. During the summer of 1839 he was on a study tour to the Sognefjord and Hardangerfjord, together with the German painter Andreas Achenbach.

Fearnley's paintings alternate between oil sketches and larger, composed landscapes meant for exhibition. His large studio compositions have a cool monumental attitude with a taste for the powerful and wildly romantic in the favorite motifs, wilderness and waterfalls, and with a strong emphasis on the image's architectural structure. The National Gallery in Oslo owns a total of 54 of his smaller pictures and sketches and also a series of drawings. Notable works in this collection include Labrofossen (1837), Grindelwaldgletsjeren (1838) and Slinde Birken (1839). Other notable collections are located in the Bergen Kunstmuseum and the Nationalmuseum in Stockholm.

== Death ==
Fearnley contracted typhoid and died in January 1842 when he was only 39 years old. He was initially buried on Südlicher Friedhof in Munich. In 1922, his son arranged to have his father's mortal remains moved to Vår Frelsers gravlund in Oslo.

== Selected works ==
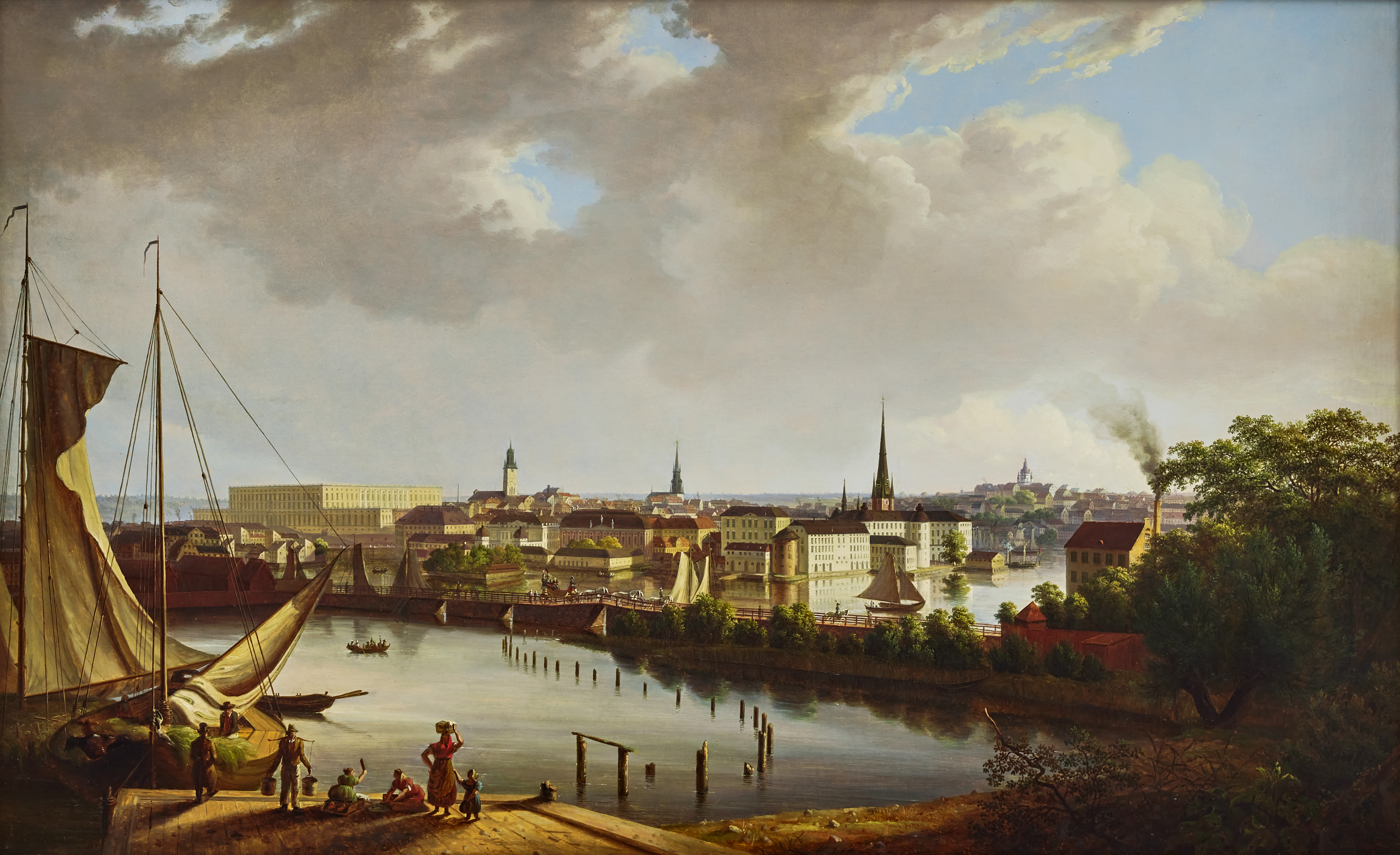
View of Stockholm, from Kungsholmen (1827)

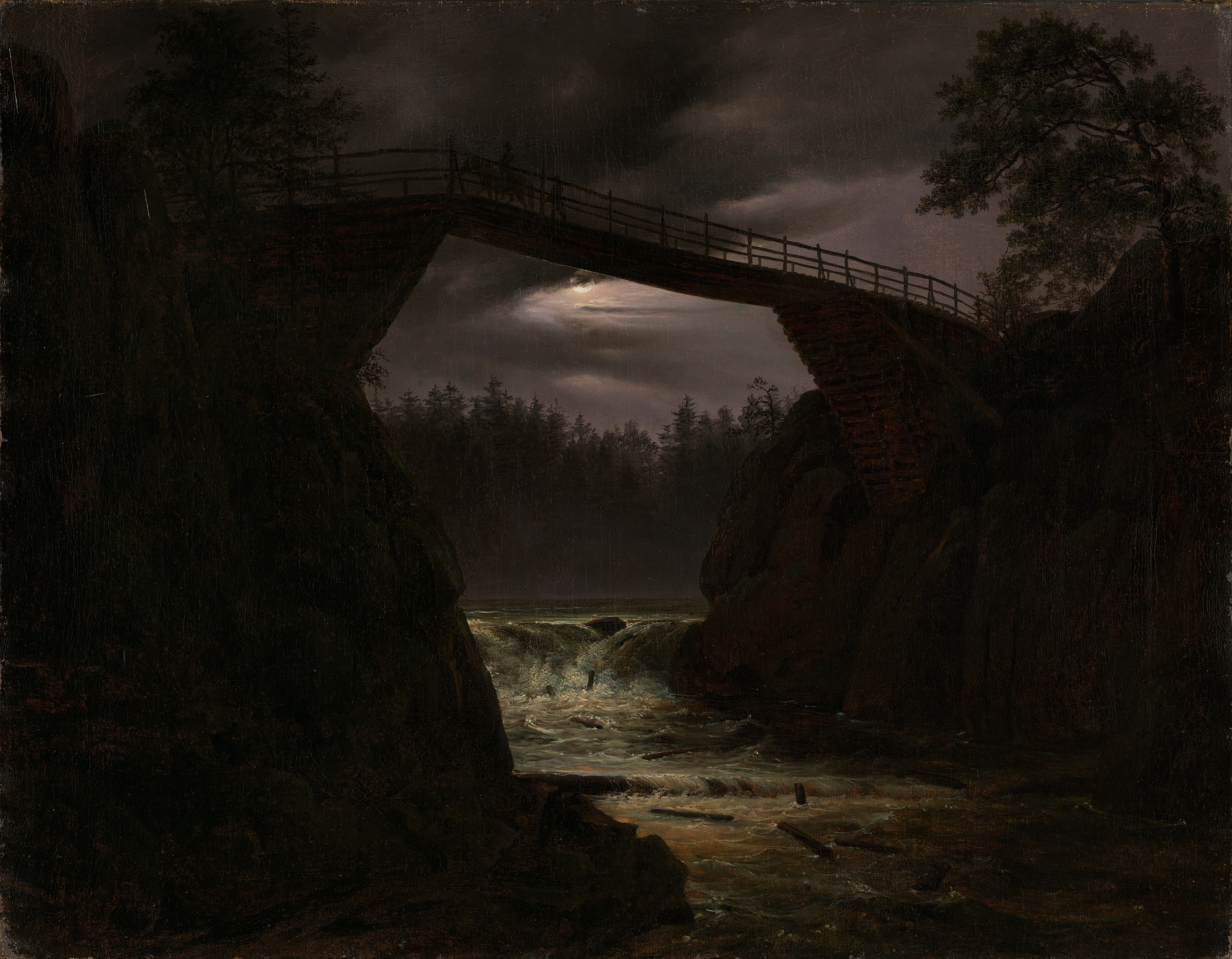
Bridge of Hauge outside Arendal (1829)

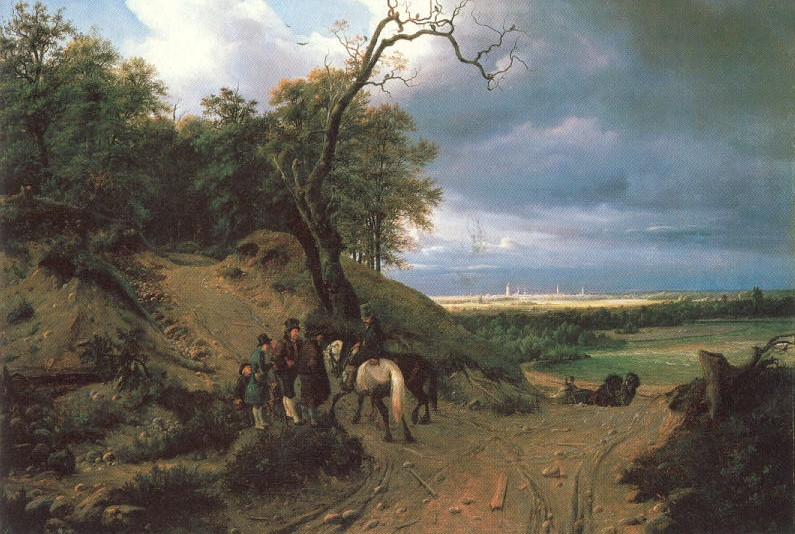
Munich after the lightning (1831)

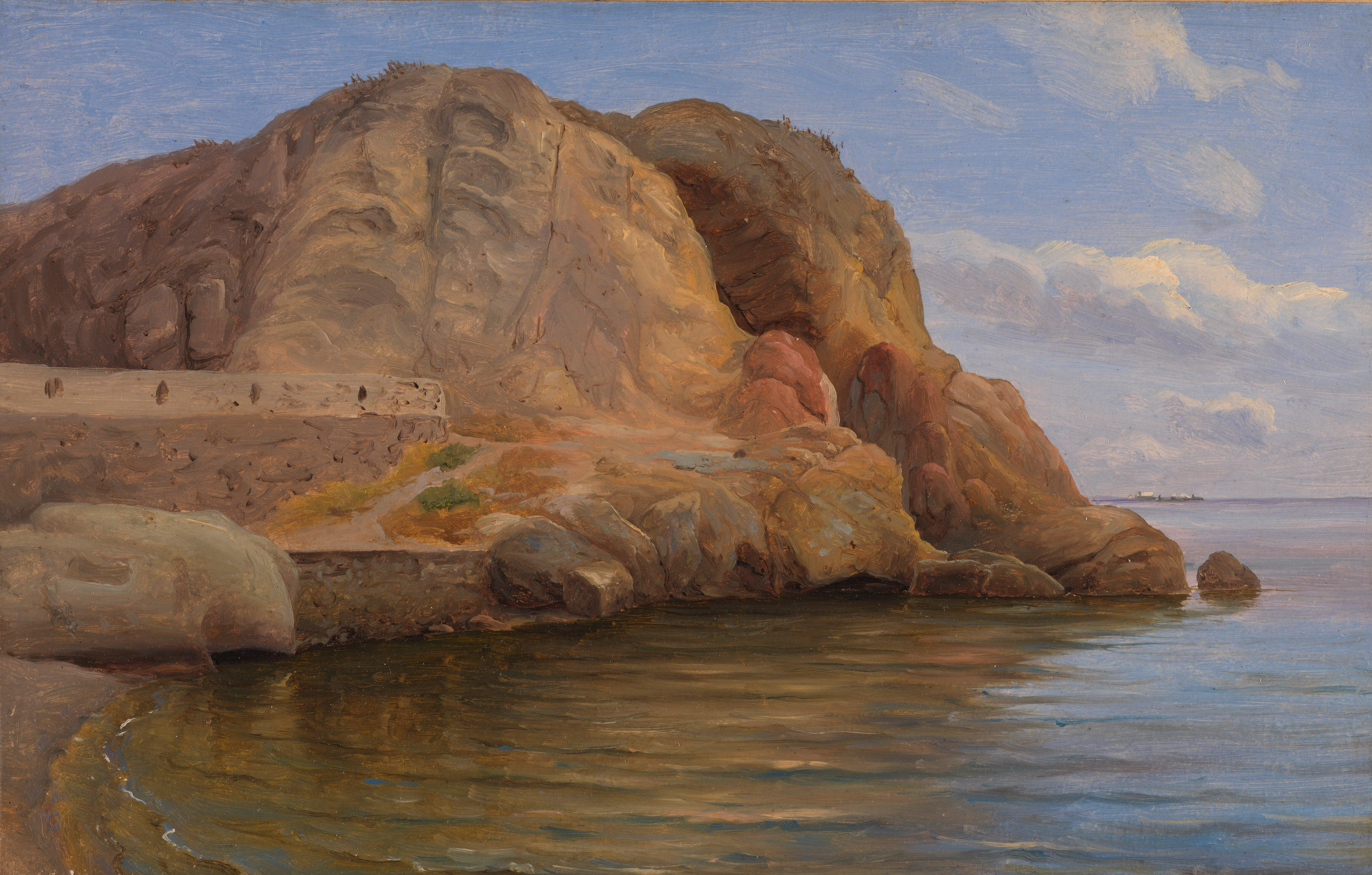
Coastal scene, possibly Capri (1833)

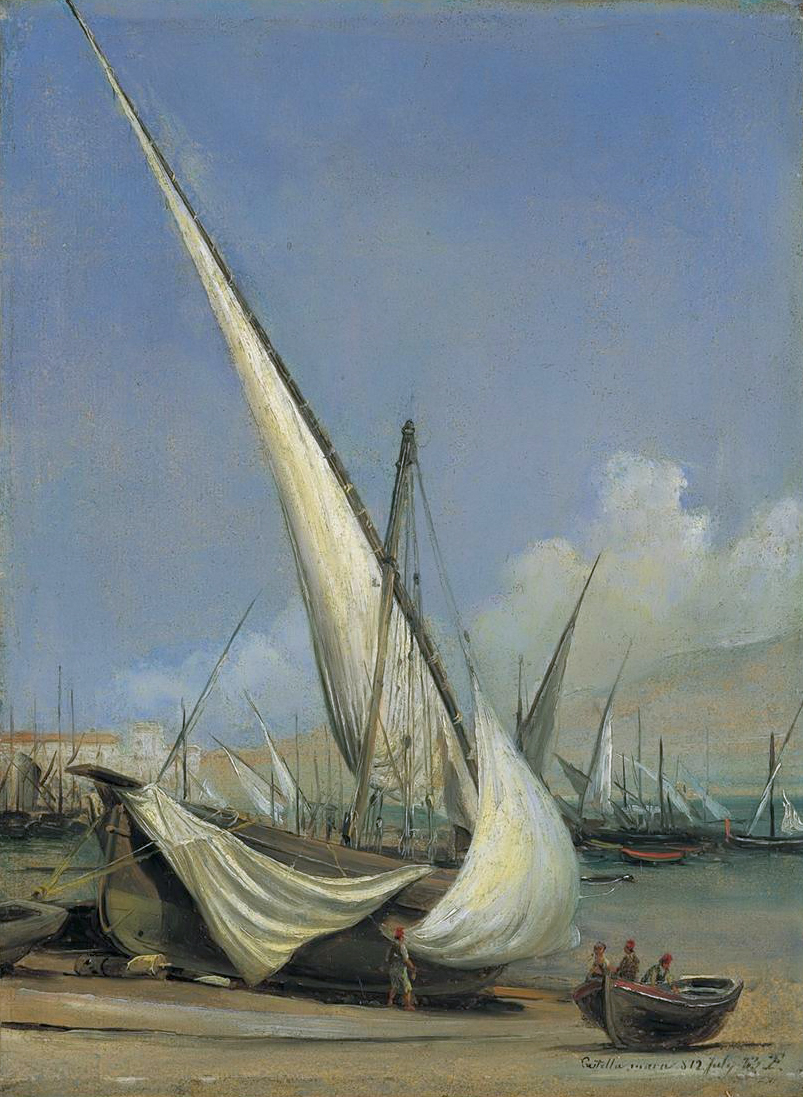
Fishing-boats, Castellammare (1833)

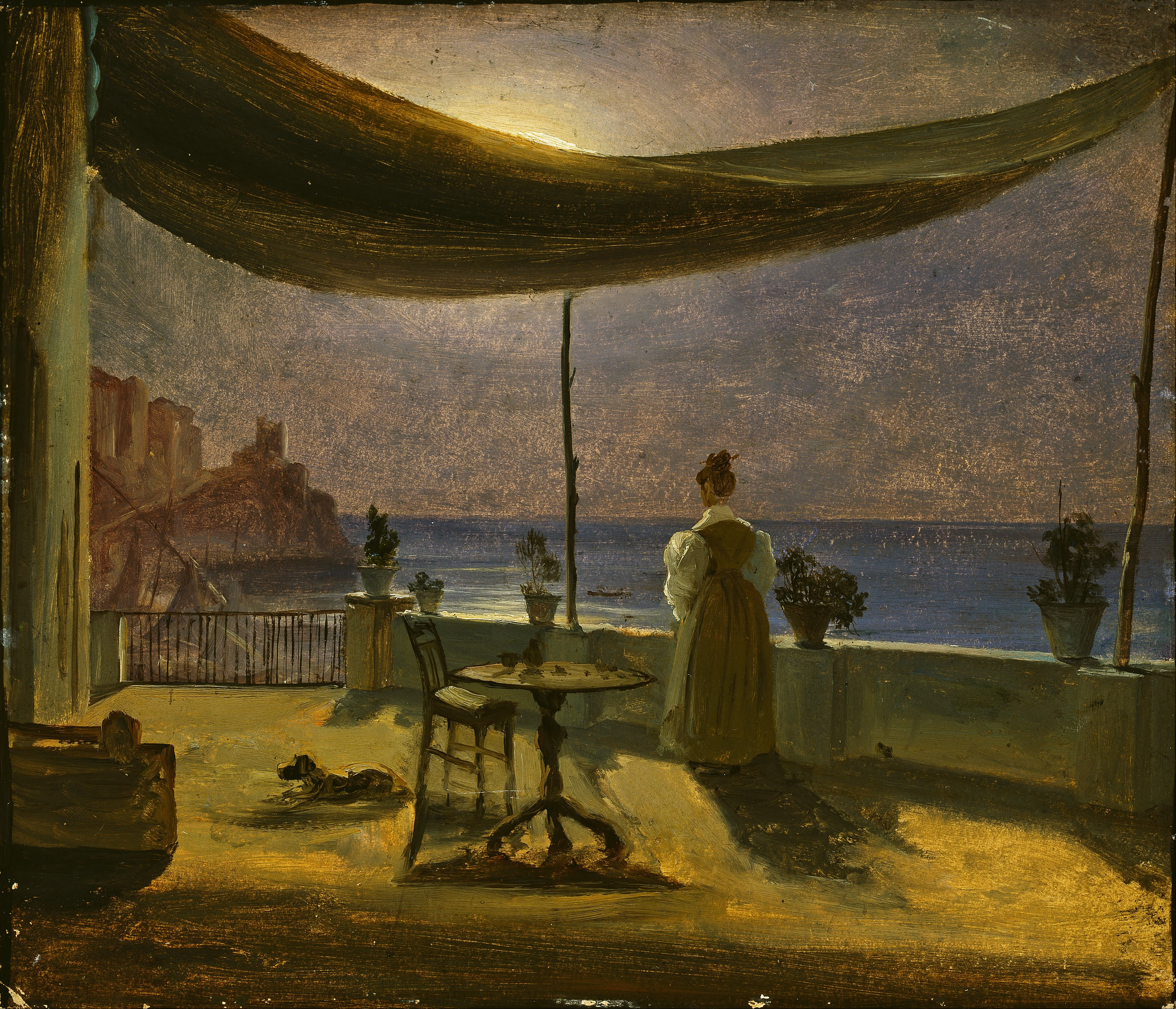
Terrace in Amalfi in Moonlight (1834)

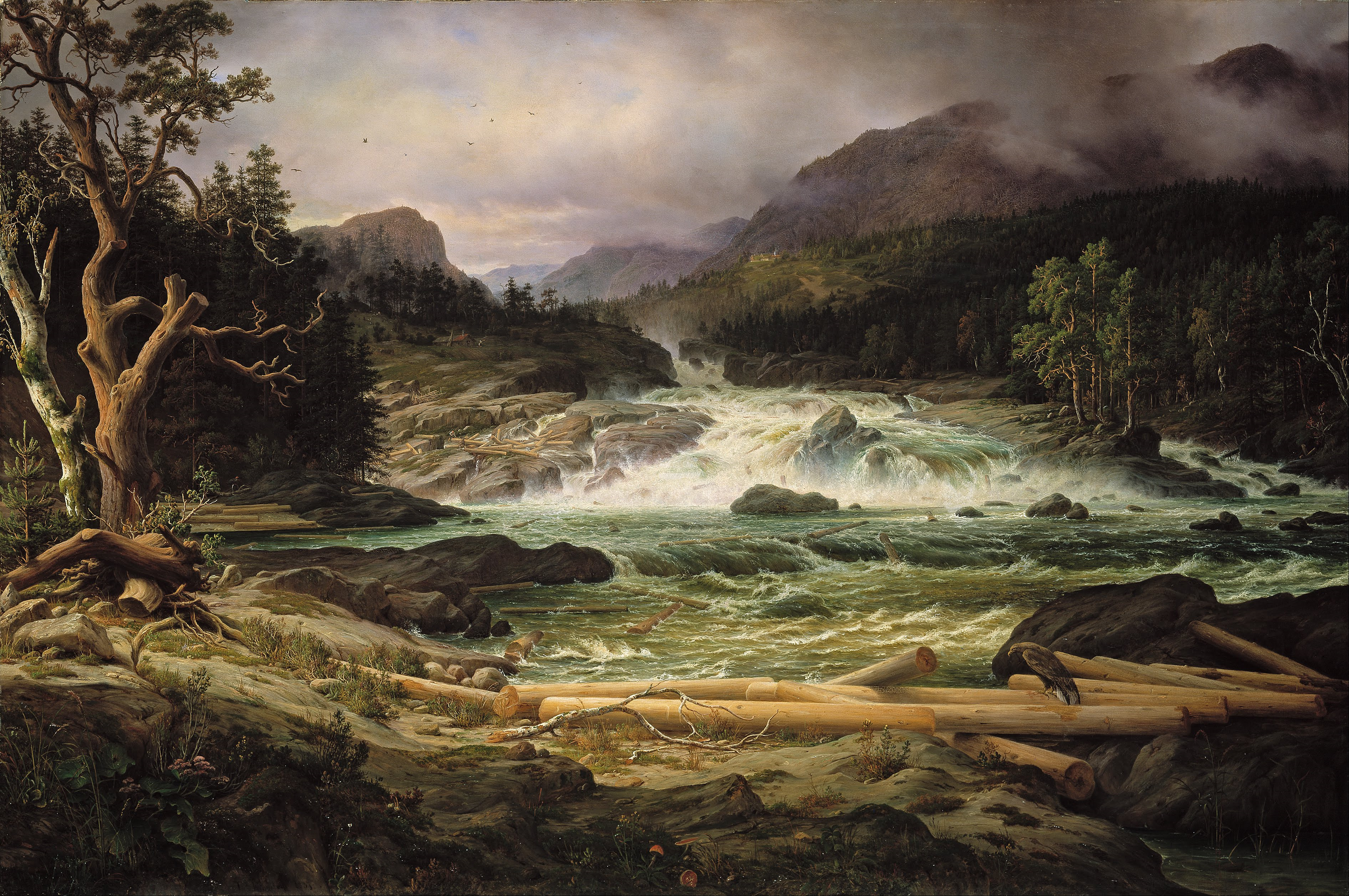
Labro Falls at Kongsberg (1837)

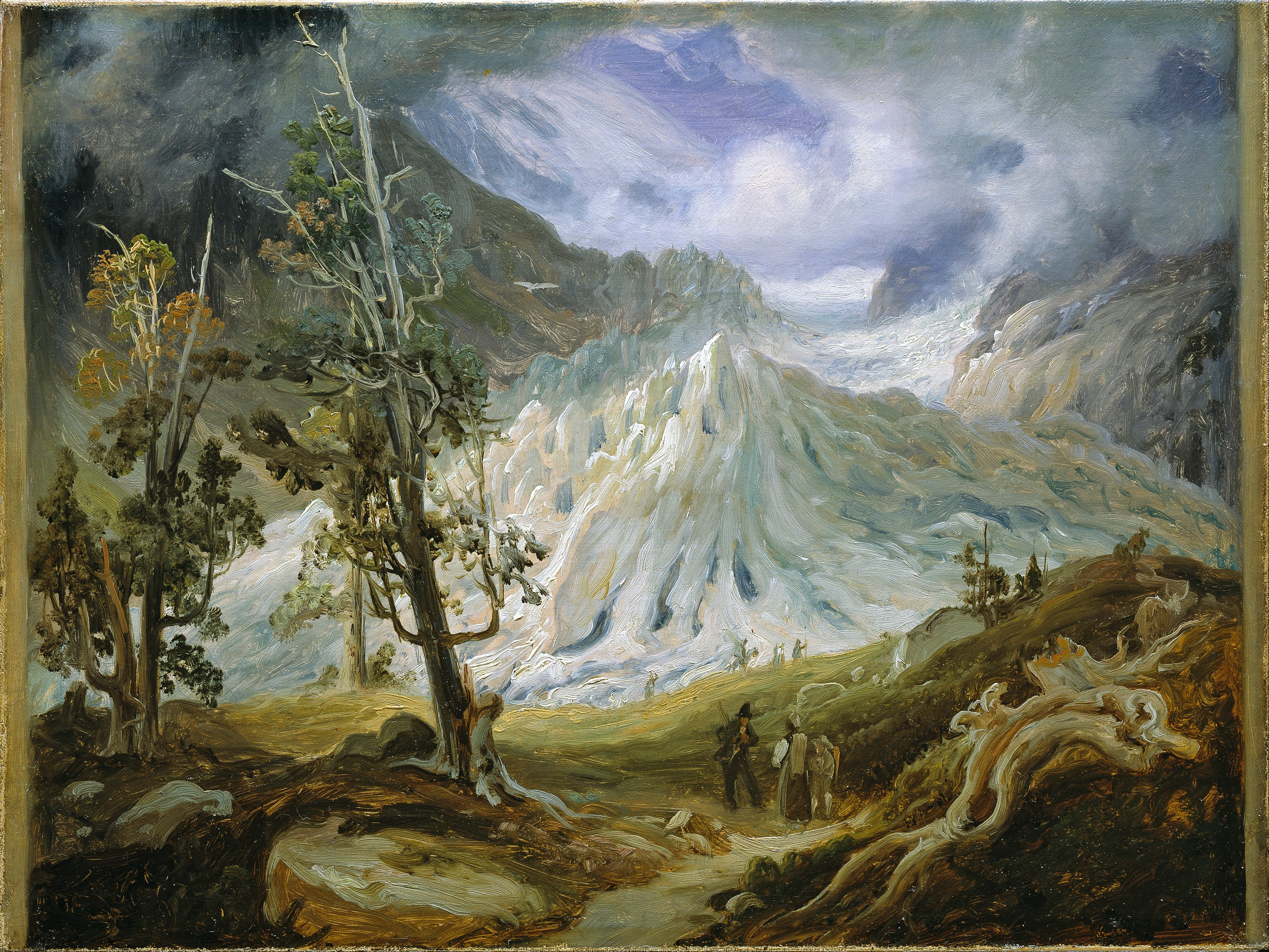
Grindelwaldgletscher II (1837)

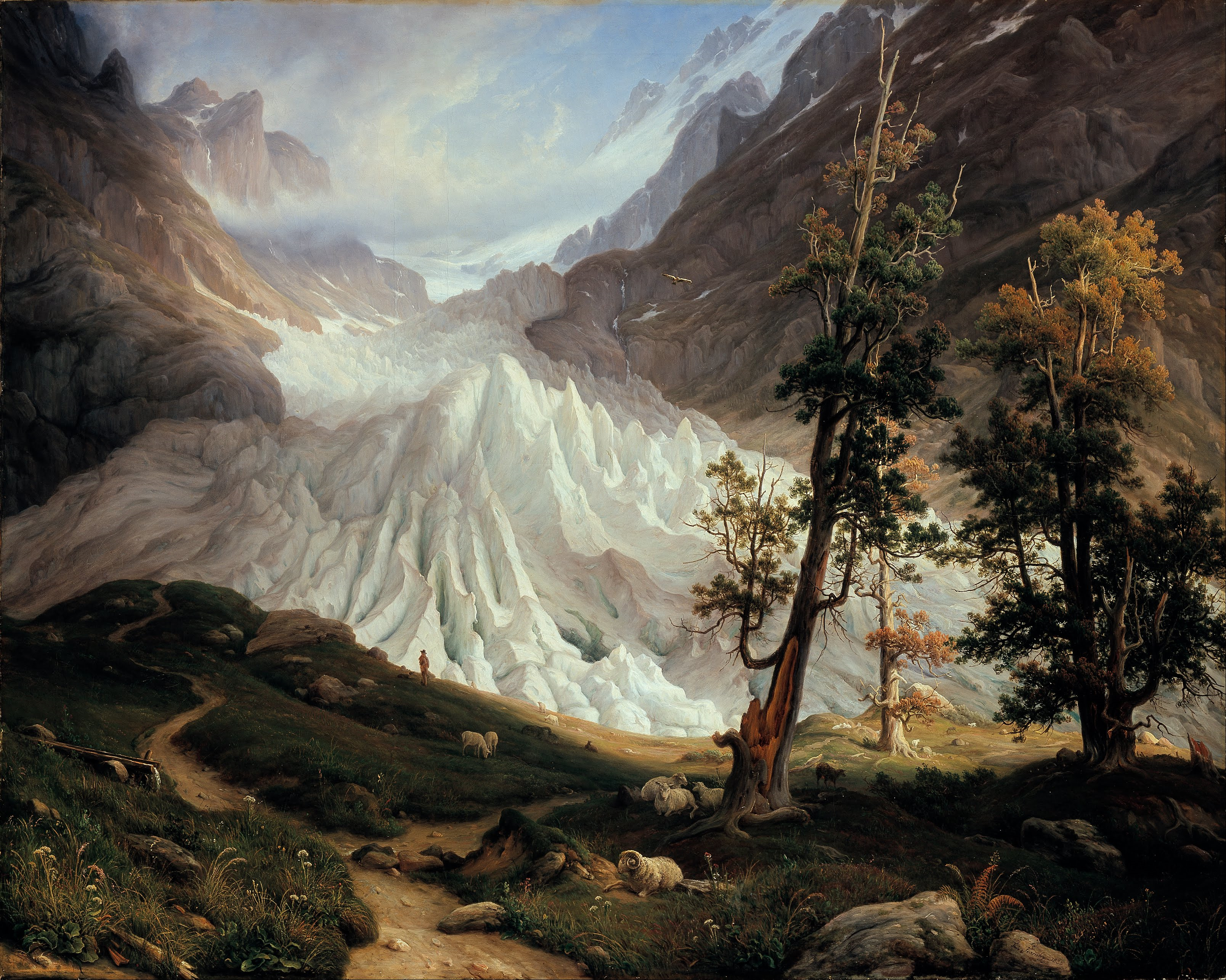
Grindelwaldgletscher, (1838)

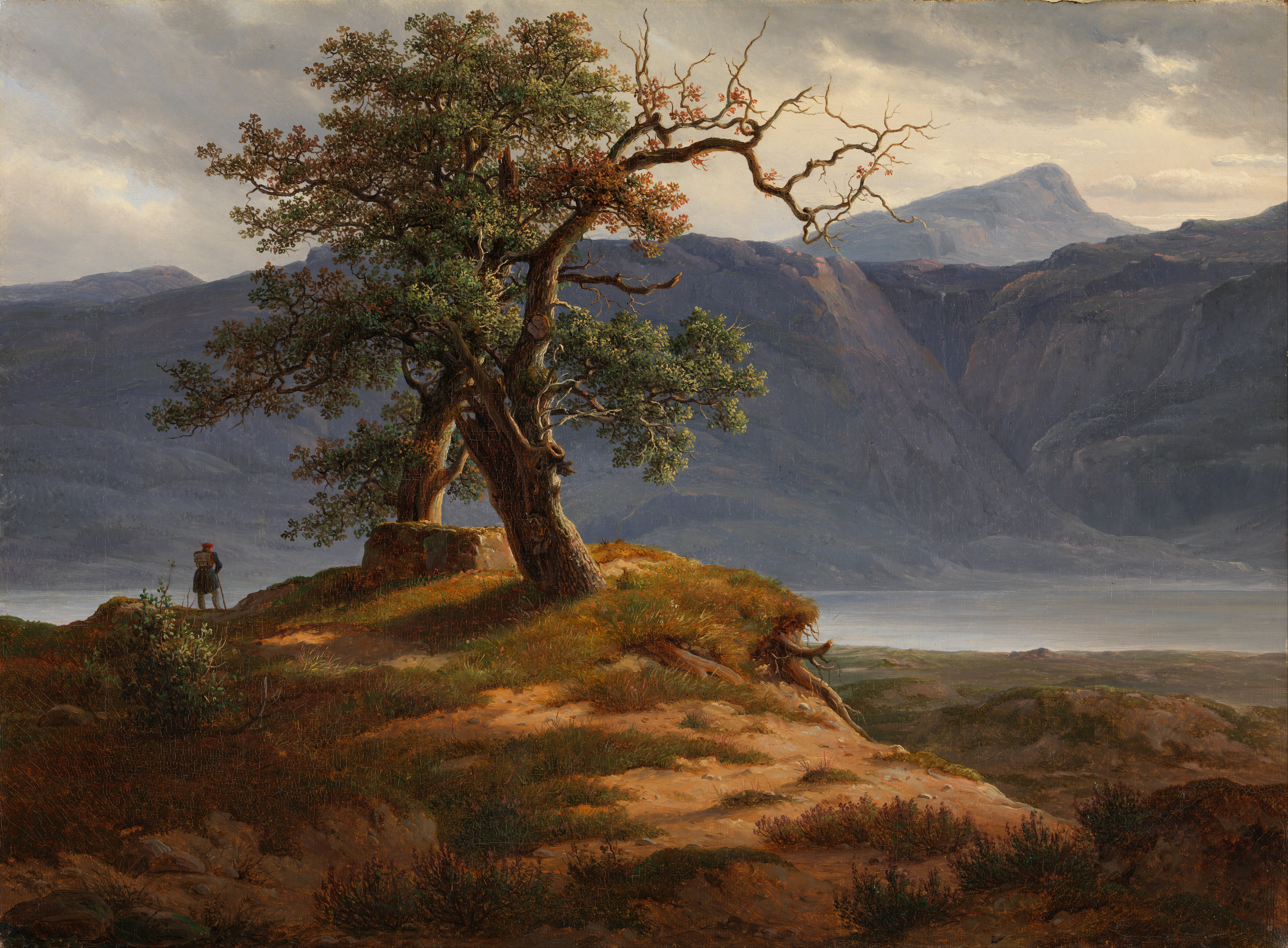
Landscape with traveller (1839)

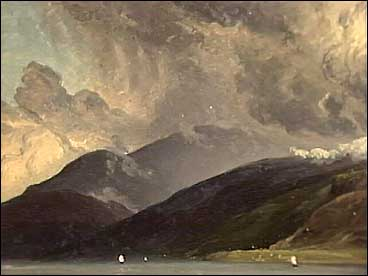
From Balestrand (1839)

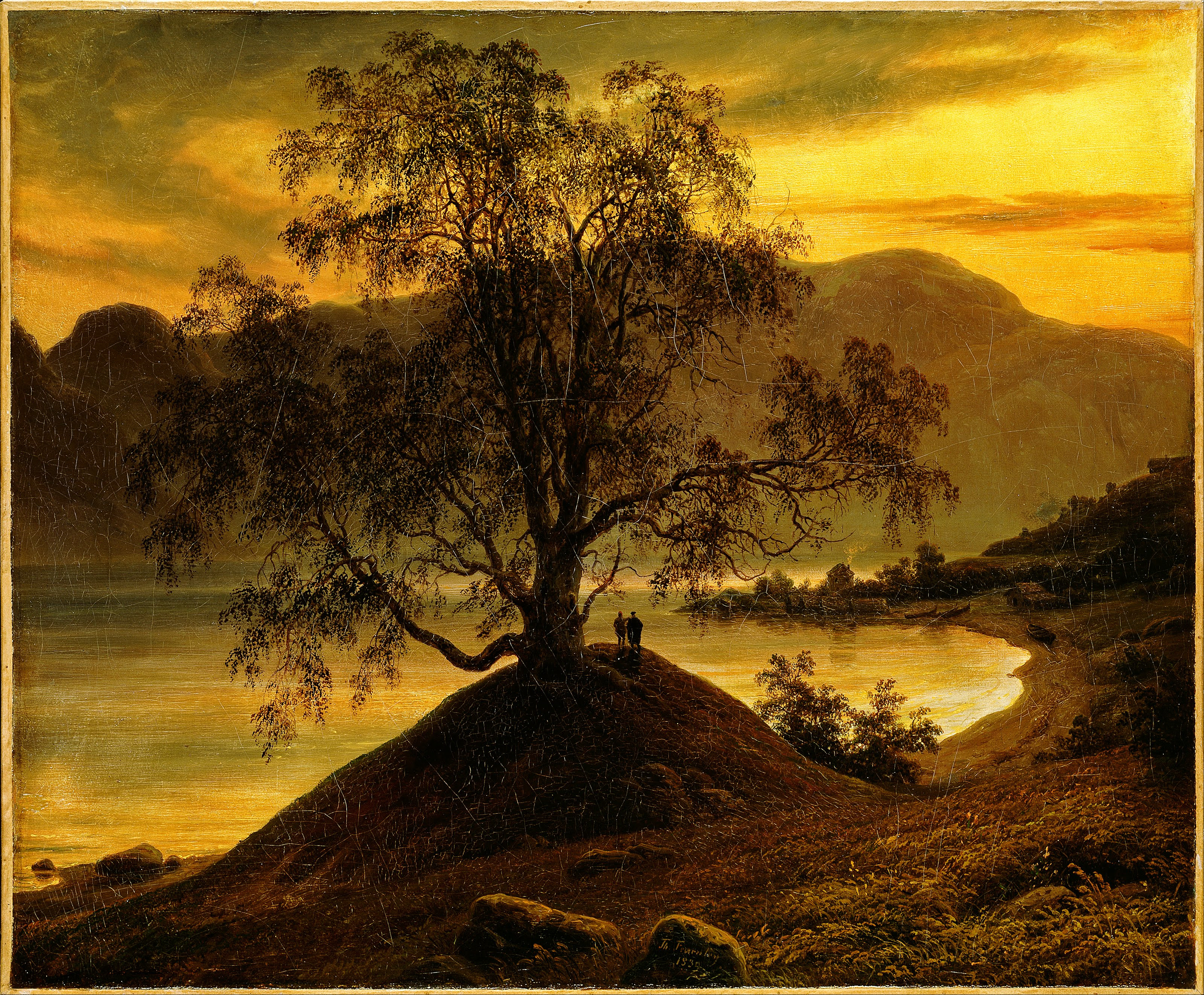
Old Birch Tree at the Sognefjord (1839)

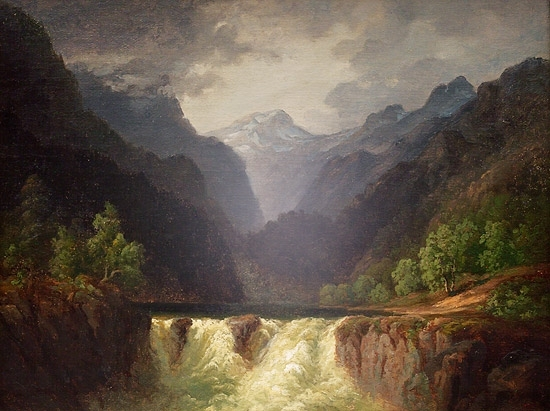
Mountain scenery with rapids

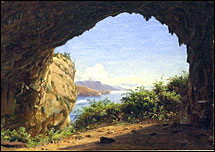
Grotta de Madre

== See also ==
- List of Norwegian artists
