= Carl Frederik Fearnley =

Norwegian astronomer

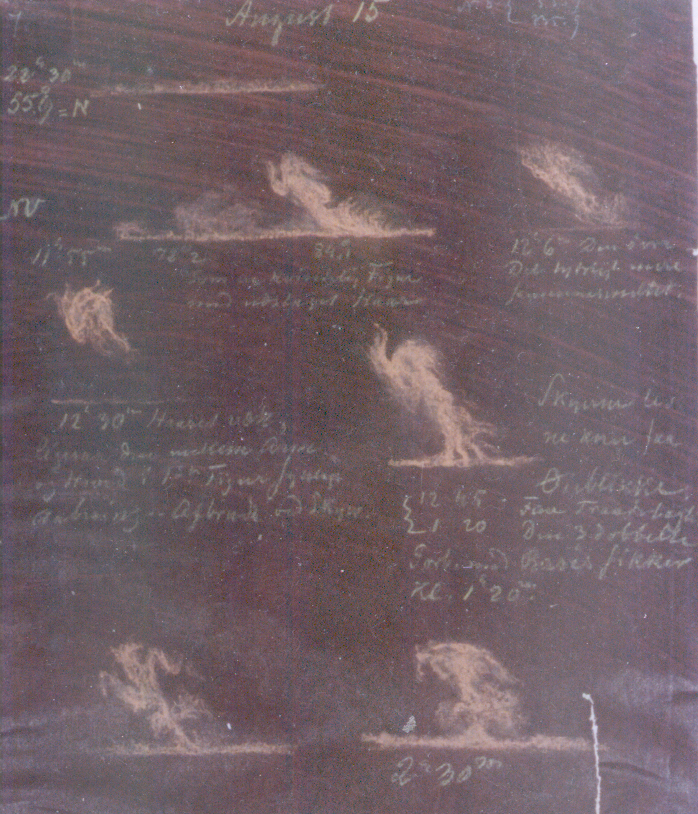
Solar prominences observed by Carl Frederik Fearnley in 1872-73

Carl Frederik Fearnley (born 19 December 1818 in Frederikshald, died 22 August 1890 in Christiania) was a Norwegian astronomer and Professor at the Royal Frederick University. He was the brother of romantic painter Thomas Fearnley.

Fearnley was the son of merchant Thomas Fearnley (1768–1834) and Maren Sophie Paus (1782–1838). He graduated in mineralogy in 1844, and became an observer at the Royal Frederick University Observatory the same year. From 1849 to 1852 he visited leading observatories in Europe. In 1857, he became lecturer and in 1861, the managing observator of the observatory. In 1865 he became professor of astronomy.

His major work is Zonenbeobachtungen der Sterne zwischen 64° 50' und 70° 10' nördlicher Declination (1888), co-authored with his observator Hans Geelmuyden (1844–1920). He published articles in Astronomische Nachrichten and Forhandlinger i Videnskabsselskabet i Kristiania. He initiated the founding of the Norwegian Meteorological Institute in 1864.
