= Thomas Fearnley (shipping magnate, born 1841) =

Norwegian shipping magnate, industrialist and philanthropist

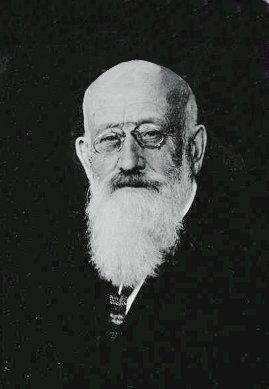
Thomas Fearnley

Thomas Nicolay Fearnley (9 April 1841, in Amsterdam – 17 May 1927, in Oslo) was a Norwegian shipping magnate, industrialist and philanthropist.

== Biography ==
He was the son of romantic painter Thomas Fearnley, and the grandson of merchant Thomas Fearnley and Maren Sophie Paus. His mother Cecilie Catharine Andresen was the daughter of banker Nicolai Andresen, founder of what became the Andresen Bank, one of Norway's largest commercial banks.

He was married to Elisabeth Young (1854–1932) and was the father of shipping magnate Thomas Fearnley and landowner N. O. Young Fearnley.

In 1869, he founded Fearnley & Eger, which became a leading Norwegian shipping company.

He was a Commander of the Order of St. Olav, a Commander of the Order of Vasa and a Commander of the Order of the Polar Star. He was awarded the court title Hofjægermester (hunting master of the court) in 1899.
