= Marie Wexelsen =

Norwegian educator, poet, children's writer and novelist

- Born: 20 September 1832; Østre Toten, Norway
- Died: 7 December 1911 (aged 79); Trondheim, Norway
- Occupations: educator, poet, children's writer and novelist
- Known for: Hymnwriting
- Notable work: Jeg er saa glad hver Julekveld (I am so glad each Christmas Eve

Marie Wexelsen (20 September 1832 – 7 December 1911) was a Norwegian educator, poet, children's writer and novelist. She is most commonly known as a hymnwriter and associated with the Christmas carol, Jeg er saa glad hver Julekveld.

== Personal life ==
Inger Marie Lyche Wexelsen was born at Østre Toten parish in Christians amt (county), Norway. Her parents were Wexel Hansen Wexelsen (1784–1867) and Marie Louise Wexels (1793–1873). She was the youngest of nine children born into a farming family. Her brother, Christian Delphin Wexelsen (1830-1883), became a locally prominent artist. She was the aunt of Vilhelm Andreas Wexelsen (1849–1909) who served as Bishop of the Diocese of Nidaros. From 1846-1852, she attended a girls' boarding school in Leikanger operated by parish priest Jacob Andreas Lindeman (1805-1846).

== Career ==
After the death of their mother, she and her sister Fredrikke Wilhelmine Wexelsen (1826-1920) settled at Hamar where they operated a school for toddlers. From 1878-79, they stayed in Denmark to prepare for careers in teaching. She attend Askov folkehøyskole which followed the educational examples of N. F. S. Grundtvig (1783–1872). From about 1890, she operated a private school in Trondheim until her death in 1911.

Marie Wexelsen published several novels, and was an avid contributor to magazines. She published her first novel, Vesle-Kari, eller de Forældreløse, in 1858 under the signature "I. L.". She is particularly remembered for the Christmas carol Jeg er saa glad hver Julekveld. It was first published in the collection Ketil, en Julegave for Smaa from 1860 with lyrics by Marie Wexelsen and melody by Peder Knudsen (1819-1863). In 1931, the song was translated from Norwegian into English as I am so glad each Christmas Eve by Peter Andrew Sveeggen (1881-1959), professor at Augsburg University.

She died in Trondheim during 1911. She was buried at Tilfredshet kirkegård in the neighborhood of Elgeseter in Trondheim. In 2013, a statue of Marie Wexelsen by sculptor Angelina Engelsen was erected in the village of Lena in Østre Toten Municipality.

== Selected works ==
- Steffen. En gammel Præstedatters Ungdomsminder (1860)
- Et Levnetsløb (1866)
- En julehistorie (1894)
- En liden Børnebog med Rim og Smaahistorier (1895)

== Related reading ==
- Harald S. Naess (1993) A History of Norwegian Literature (University of Nebraska Press) ISBN 978-0-8032-3317-1
