= Totenviken Church =

Church in Innlandet, Norway

- Totenviken kirke
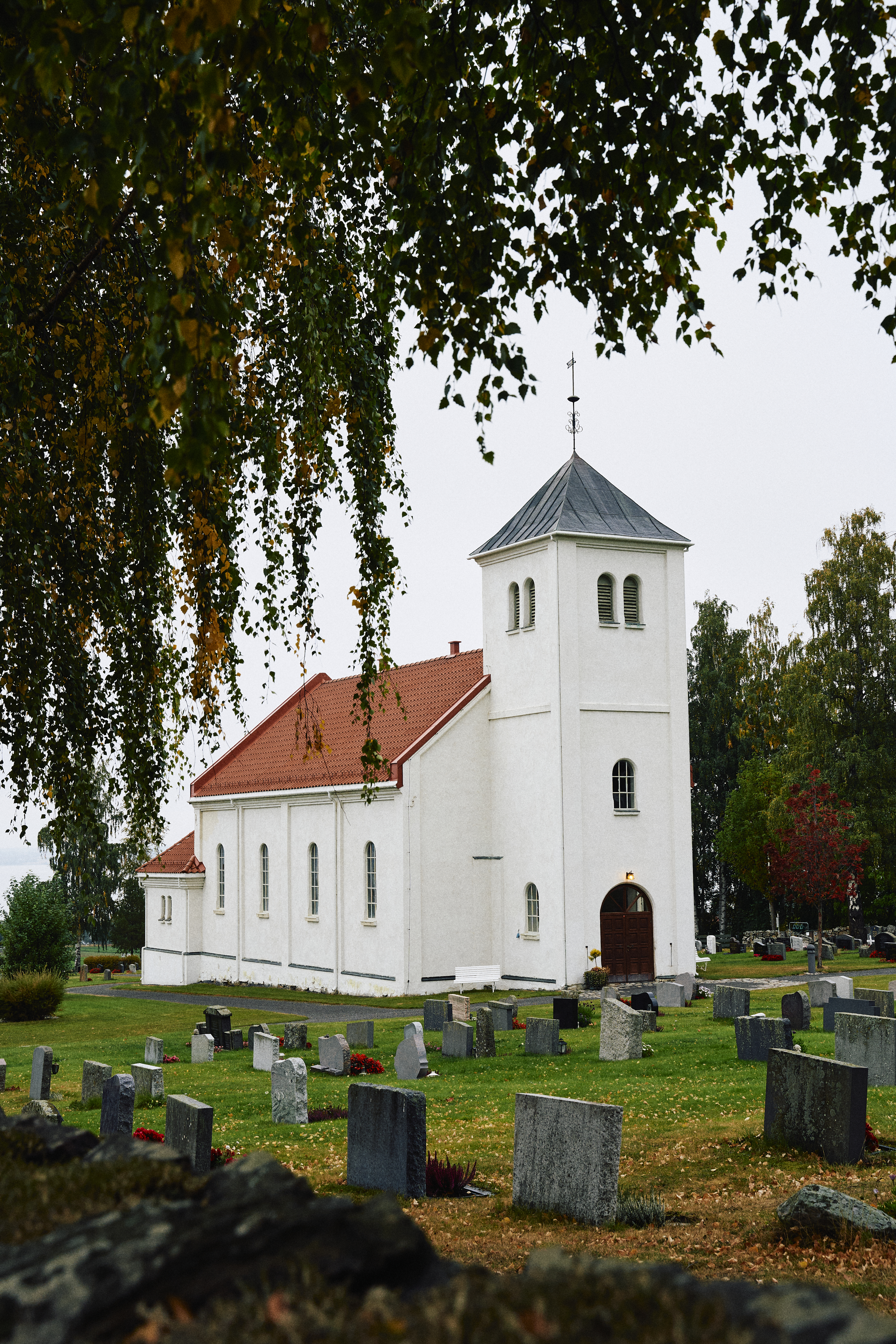
- View of the church
- Totenviken Church
- 60°38′43″N 11°00′06″E
- Location: Østre Toten, Innlandet
- Country: Norway
- Denomination: Church of Norway
- Churchmanship: Evangelical Lutheran

History
- Status: Parish church
- Founded: 1896
- Consecrated: 25 November 1896

Architecture
- Functional status: Active
- Architect: Peter Kjølseth
- Architectural type: Long church
- Completed: 1896 (130 years ago)

Specifications
- Capacity: 400
- Materials: Plastered brick

Administration
- Diocese: Hamar bispedømme
- Deanery: Toten prosti
- Parish: Balke
- Norwegian Cultural Heritage Site
- Type: Church
- Status: Not protected
- ID: 85658

Totenviken Church (Norwegian: Totenviken kirke) is a parish church of the Church of Norway in Østre Toten Municipality in Innlandet county, Norway. It is located in the village of Totenvika. It is one of the churches for the Balke parish which is part of the Toten prosti (deanery) in the Diocese of Hamar. The white, plastered brick church was built in a long church design in 1896 using plans drawn up by the architect Peter Kjølseth. The church seats about 400 people.

== History ==
In 1864, the graveyard at the nearby Balke Church had gotten too small, so an auxiliary cemetery was built in Totenvika. The new cemetery was consecrated on 30 September 1864. In the 1880s, there was growing interest in having an annex chapel built on the site of the cemetery. Fundraising campaigns started, and architectural drawings were obtained from Peter Kjølseth. The new building was built with brick and covered with plaster. Originally, it was called Viken Chapel and it was consecrated on 25 November 1896. In 1922–1923, the church was renovated. The old tower was taken down and a new tower with a different design was built. Also, a new choir and sacristies were built on the east end of the building. The building was re-consecrated on 14 September 1923.

== Media gallery ==
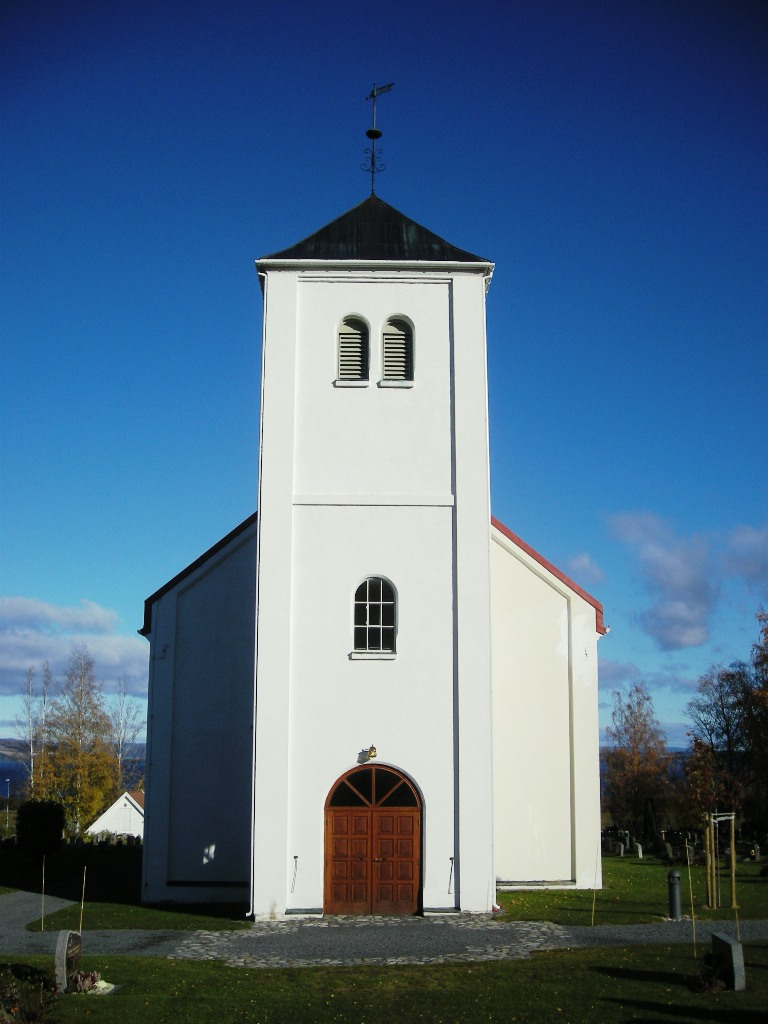

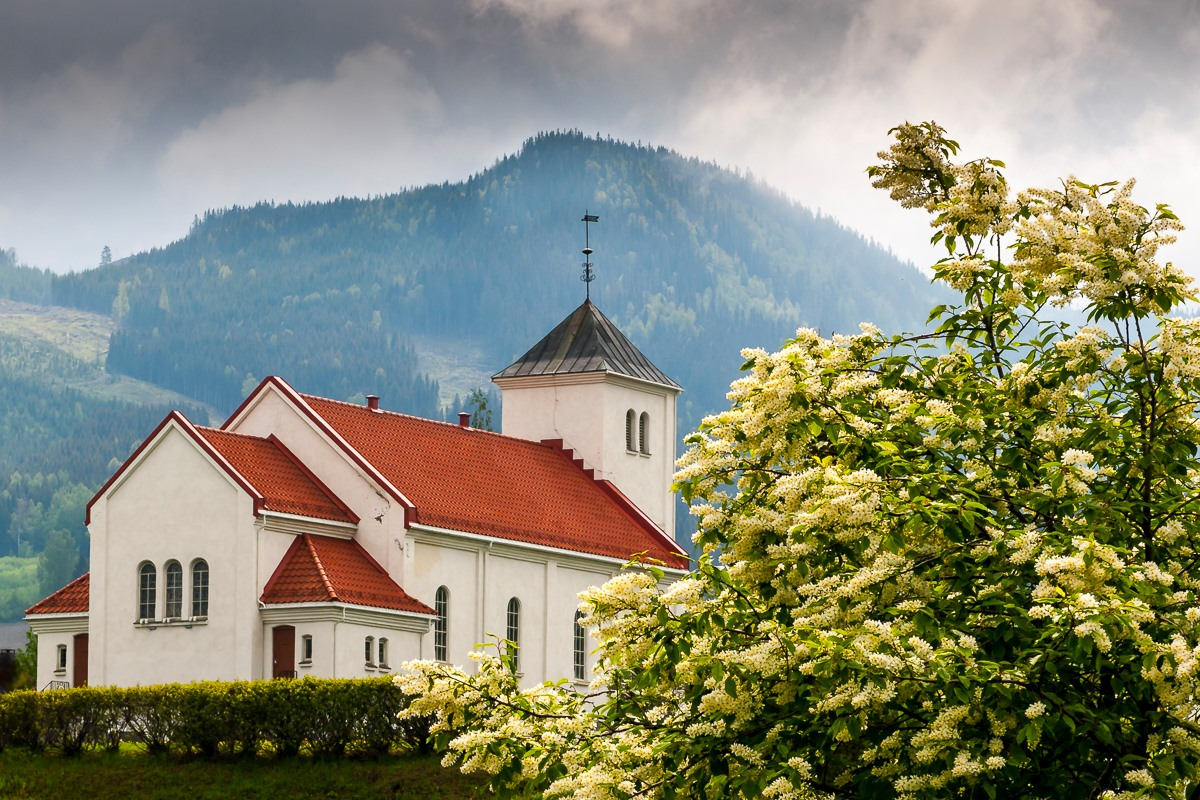

== See also ==
- List of churches in Hamar
