= Lensbygda =

Village in Østre Toten Municipality, Norway

- Village
- Interactive map of Lensbygda
- Location within Innlandet Location within Norway
- Coordinates: 60.64472°N 10.84147°E
- Country: Norway
- Region: Eastern Norway
- County: Innlandet
- District: Toten
- Municipality: Østre Toten Municipality

Area
  - Total: 0.59 km^{2} (0.23 sq mi)
- Elevation: 363 m (1,191 ft)

Population (2024)
  - Total: 492
  - Density: 834/km^{2} (2,160/sq mi)
- Time zone: UTC+01:00 (CET)
  - Summer (DST): UTC+02:00 (CEST)
- Post Code: 2850 Lena

Lensbygda is a village in Østre Toten Municipality in Innlandet county, Norway. The village is located about 5 kilometres (3.1 mi) to the east of the village of Kolbu, about 3 kilometres (1.9 mi) south of the villages of Lena and Kraby, and about 5 kilometres (3.1 mi) to the west of the village of Skreia.

The 0.59-square-kilometre (150-acre) village has a population (2024) of 492 and a population density of 834 inhabitants per square kilometre (2,160/sq mi).
