= Peder Jensen Fauchald =

Norwegian politician

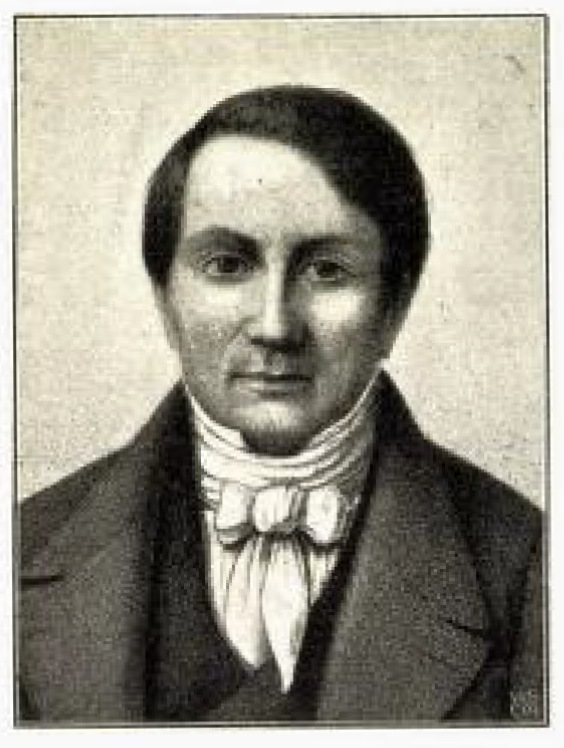

Mayor of Østre Toten Municipality
- In office 1837–1847; 1850–1856

Personal details
- Born: 15 November 1791 Østre Toten, Christians amt, Norway
- Died: 1 July 1856 (aged 64)
- Occupation: Farmer

Peder Jensen Fauchald (15 November 1791 – 1 July 1856) was a Norwegian politician.

He was elected to the Norwegian Parliament in 1830, 1833, 1836, 1839, 1842 1845, 1848 and 1851, representing the rural constituency of Christians Amt.

He was born in Østre Toten. He advocated freedom of religion in general and especially the right of Jews to enter Norway (which was granted in 1851). Locally, he became mayor of Østre Toten Municipality in 1838, was appointed county auditor, and founded the local savings bank. He sat as mayor from 1837 to 1847 and 1850 to 1856, being succeeded by Ole Larsen Hammerstad. He worked as a farmer.

There is a Fauchalds gate (street) in Oslo.
