= Peder Paulsen Balke =

Norwegian farmer and non-commissioned officer

Peder Paulsen Balke (4 May 1779 – 6 September 1840) was a Norwegian farmer and non-commissioned officer in the military. He served as a representative at the Norwegian Constitutional Assembly.

Peder Paulsen Balke was born in Østre Toten in Christians amt, Norway. He became a soldier with the Søndenfieldske Dragon-Regiment in 1801. He was a corporal from 1808 and in 1814 was stationed at Kongsberg. In 1812, he married Mari Andersdatte (1789-1874). Balke took over father's farm Østre Balke in Østre Toten during 1813.

He represented Søndenfieldske Dragon-Regiment at the Norwegian Constituent Assembly in 1814 together with Eilert Waldemar Preben Ramm. Both delegates supported the position of the independence party (Selvstendighetspartiet). He was the brother in law and cousin of Niels Fredriksen Dyhren, who also attended the Assembly as a representative from the Norske Jæger Corps.

== Related Reading ==
- Holme Jørn (2014) De kom fra alle kanter - Eidsvollsmennene og deres hus (Oslo: Cappelen Damm) ISBN 978-82-02-44564-5
