= Hoff Church =

Church in Innlandet, Norway

- Hoff kirke
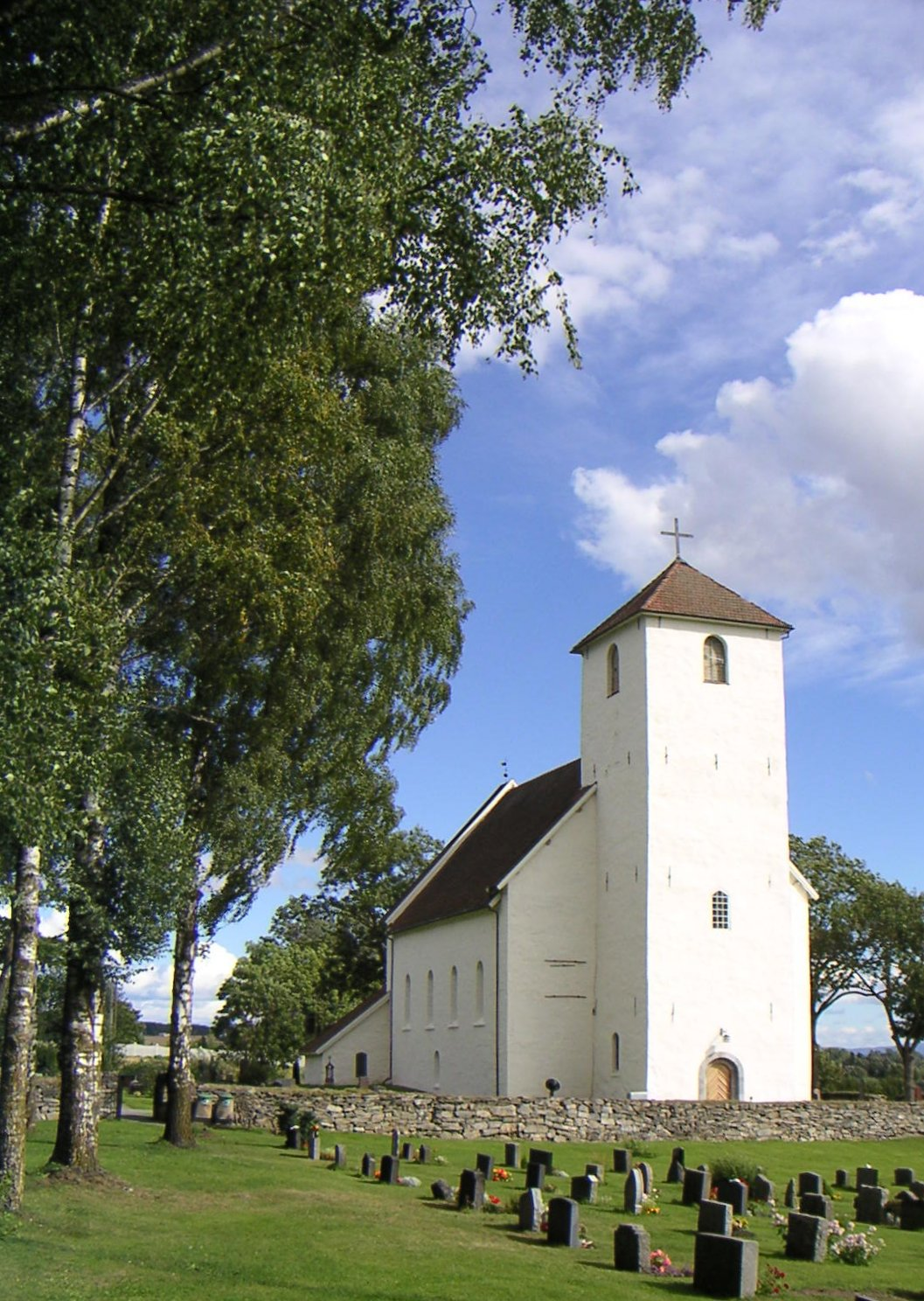
- View of the church
- Hoff Church
- 60°41′02″N 10°50′44″E
- Location: Østre Toten, Innlandet
- Country: Norway
- Denomination: Church of Norway
- Previous denomination: Catholic Church
- Churchmanship: Evangelical Lutheran

History
- Status: Parish church
- Founded: 11th century
- Consecrated: c. 1150

Architecture
- Functional status: Active
- Architectural type: Long church
- Completed: c. 1150 (876 years ago)

Specifications
- Capacity: 332
- Materials: Stone

Administration
- Diocese: Hamar bispedømme
- Deanery: Toten prosti
- Parish: Hoff
- Norwegian Cultural Heritage Site
- Type: Church
- Status: Automatically protected
- ID: 84592

Hoff Church (Norwegian: Hoff kirke) is a parish church of the Church of Norway in Østre Toten Municipality in Innlandet county, Norway. It is located in the village of Kraby, just east of the municipal centre of Lena. It is the church for the Hoff parish which is part of the Toten prosti (deanery) in the Diocese of Hamar. The white, stone church was built in a long church design during the 12th century using plans drawn up by an unknown architect. The church seats about 332 people.

The church is known for its excellent acoustics and is often used for concerts.

== History ==
Tradition states that a wooden post church or stave church was built at Hoff around the year 1021 on the orders of King Olaf II of Norway. This site had long been a site of pagan worship and when King Olav brought Christianity to Norway, a church would have been built here. Not much is known about that church. During the 11th century, the old wooden church was torn down and replaced with a new building of limestone. The new stone church is similar in construction to the old cathedrals at Hamar, Nikolai Church in Gran, Old Aker Church, and Ringsaker Church. The joint model for these churches was the historic St. Hallvard's Cathedral, the main church of medieval Oslo. After 1658, Hallvard's Cathedral was demolished with only ruins left of the former cathedral. The original stone church was designed as a basilica with a ceiling height of 12 metres (39 ft) in the nave and a ceiling height of 6 metres (20 ft) in the side aisles. The church had a transept that reached to the outer walls of the aisles, giving it a cruciform floor plan. The church had a tower on the central part of the roof. The church originally did not have windows on the north side.

In 1508, there was a local peasant uprising. The church was used as a fortification and was set on fire. The church was rebuilt afterwards, with some changes made. The altarpiece dates to 1664 and was designed by Laurits Lauritsen from Nes. In the center of the altarpiece is a painting believed to be by parish priest Knud Sevaldsen Bang (1633–1694). The church has a distinctive collection of paintings dating from the late 17th century including works believed to be by priest and artist Didrik Muus (1633–1706). There was also a major renovation in 1700–1703. This time, the old wooden tower was removed, and a new tower on the west end of the building was erected with a church porch at the base of the tower. A high spire had been planned, but the base of the tower was said to be too weak and not built together with the church walls, so the high spire was not built. The year 1702 is painted on the lime plaster under the eaves, marking the year of construction on that addition. In connection with the removal of the old tower, the entire roof of the nave was also removed. The exterior walls of the nave were built higher before rebuilding the roof, giving the nave flat ceiling as opposed to the original with a higher central part. The short transepts were removed, giving the church a long church floorplan. The baptismal font dates to 1703 and was designed by Lars Jensson Borg (d. 1710). A tower clock with a dial was set up on the north tower wall in 1713. In 1807, there were major repairs to the floor and ceiling.

In 1814, this church served as an election church (Norwegian: valgkirke). Together with more than 300 other parish churches across Norway, it was a polling station for elections to the 1814 Norwegian Constituent Assembly which wrote the Constitution of Norway. This was Norway's first national elections. Each church parish was a constituency that elected people called "electors" who later met together in each county to elect the representatives for the assembly that was to meet at Eidsvoll Manor later that year.

The pulpit was made by Kristian Kloppen in 1829. In the 1850s, the south wall was reported to be fragile and the floor worn, and roof tiles had to be replaced, so a large renovation was planned. In 1861, the church was renovated. This project included replacing the floor and installing a new roof. A wooden ball from 1812 that was at the top of the tower was replaced with a cross. In 1894–1895, the church underwent another renovation led by architect Johan Meyer. In addition to the work being done, the church was carefully examined and it was historically documented. New windows on both the north and south side were installed during this project. Cement mortar was used for a lot of work, although this was not how the stone church was historically built. In 1952, a restoration of the interior led by Finn Bryn began. The church got new doors and the main entrance got a new limestone frame. The second floor seating galleries were rebuilt (not for the first time), and new tile floors were laid in the church porch and new wooden floors were installed elsewhere.

== Media gallery ==
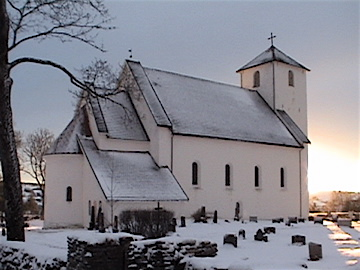
Hoff Kirke

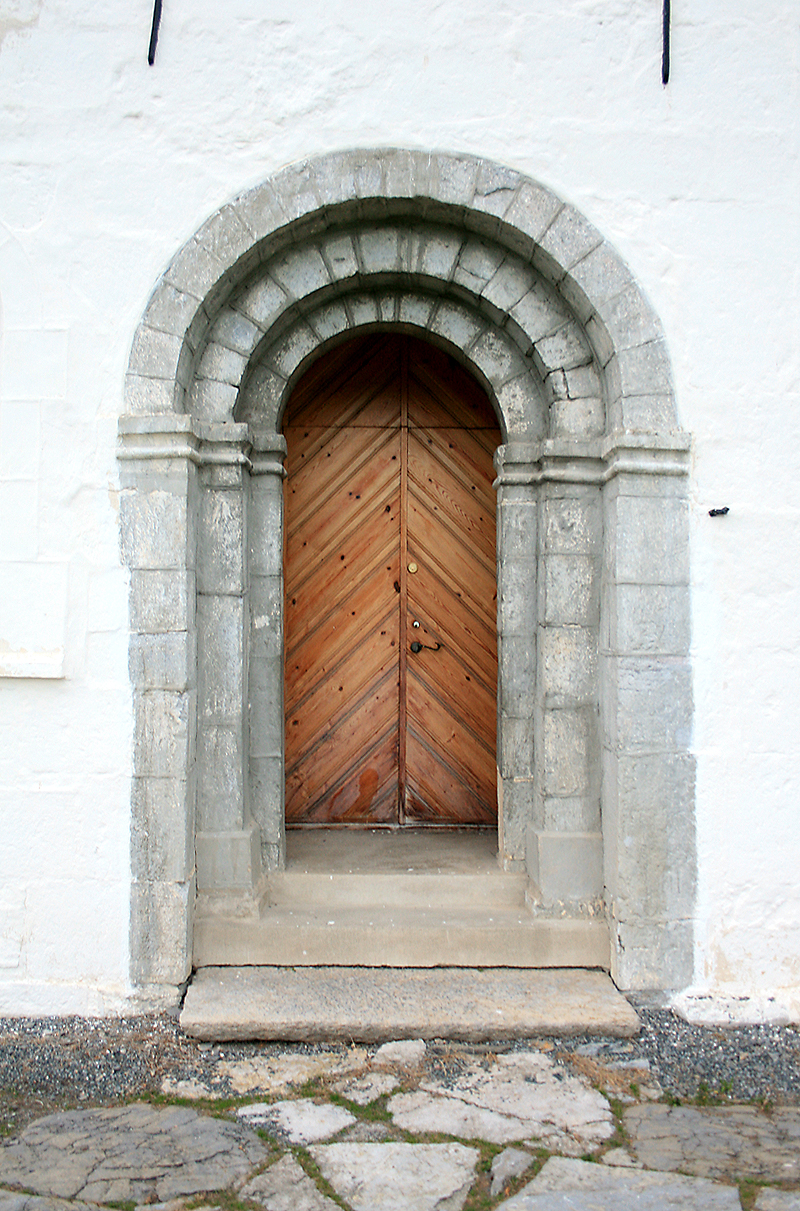
Portal

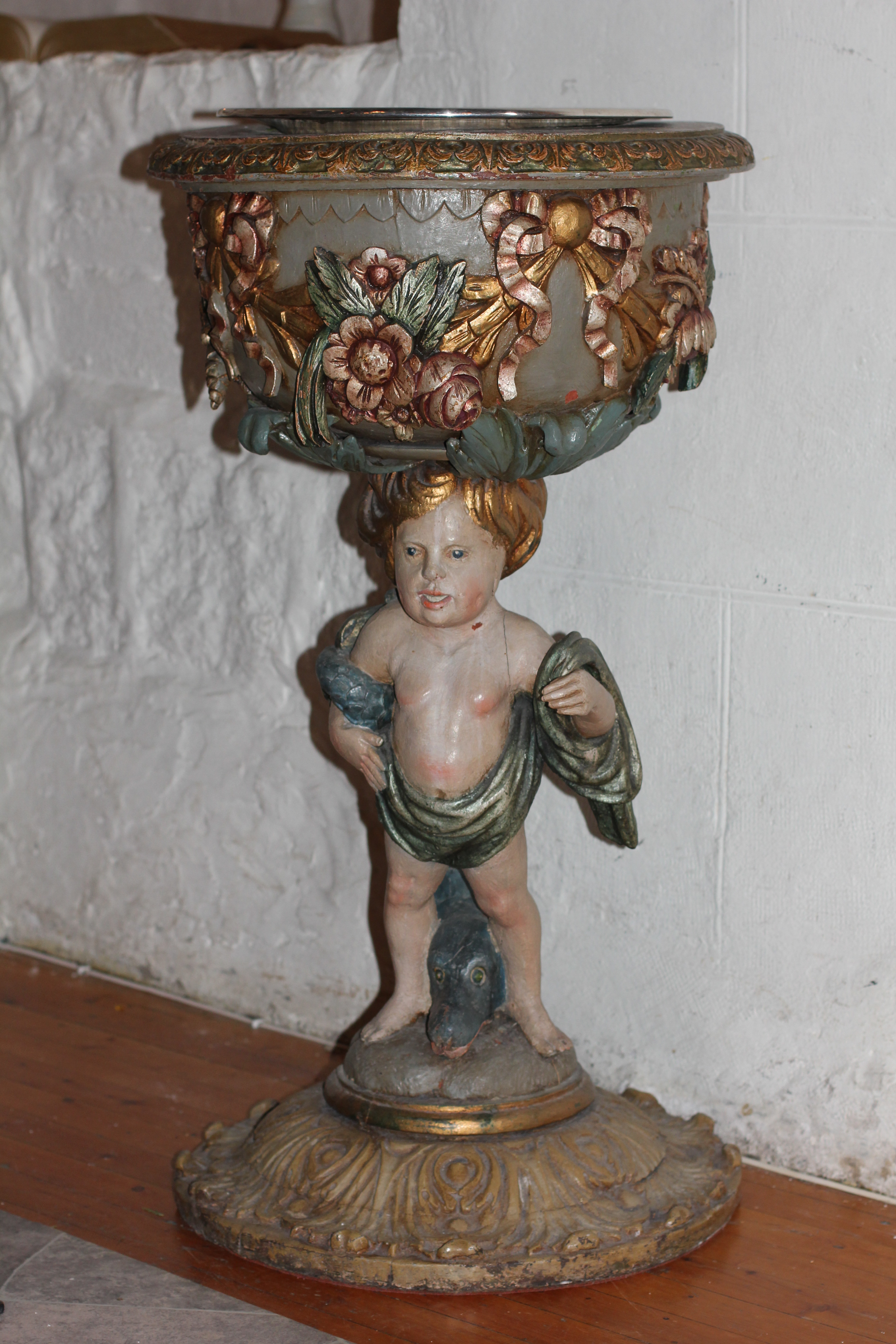
Baptisimal font of Hoff church

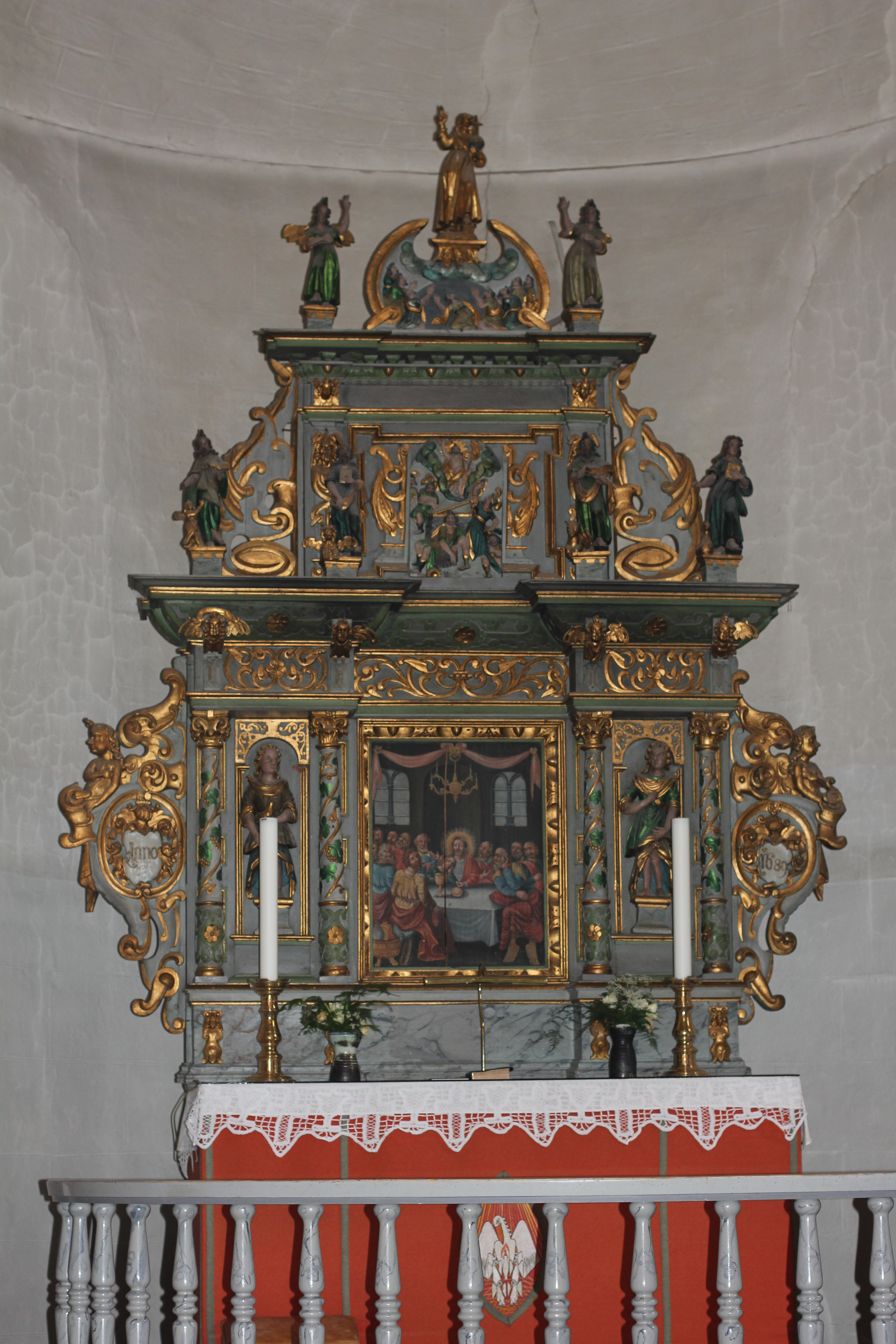
Altarpiece of Hoff church

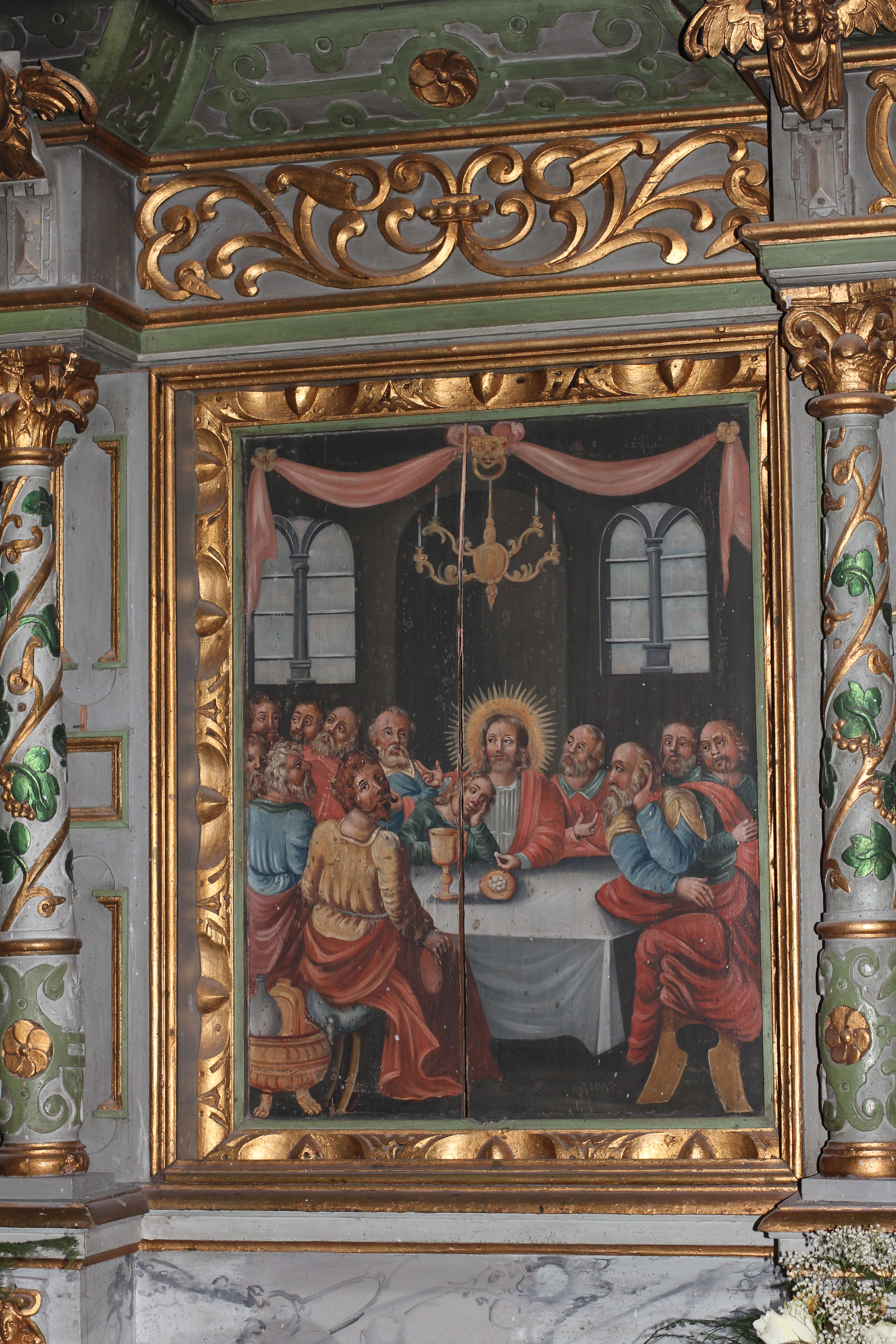
Painting at the center of the altarpiece

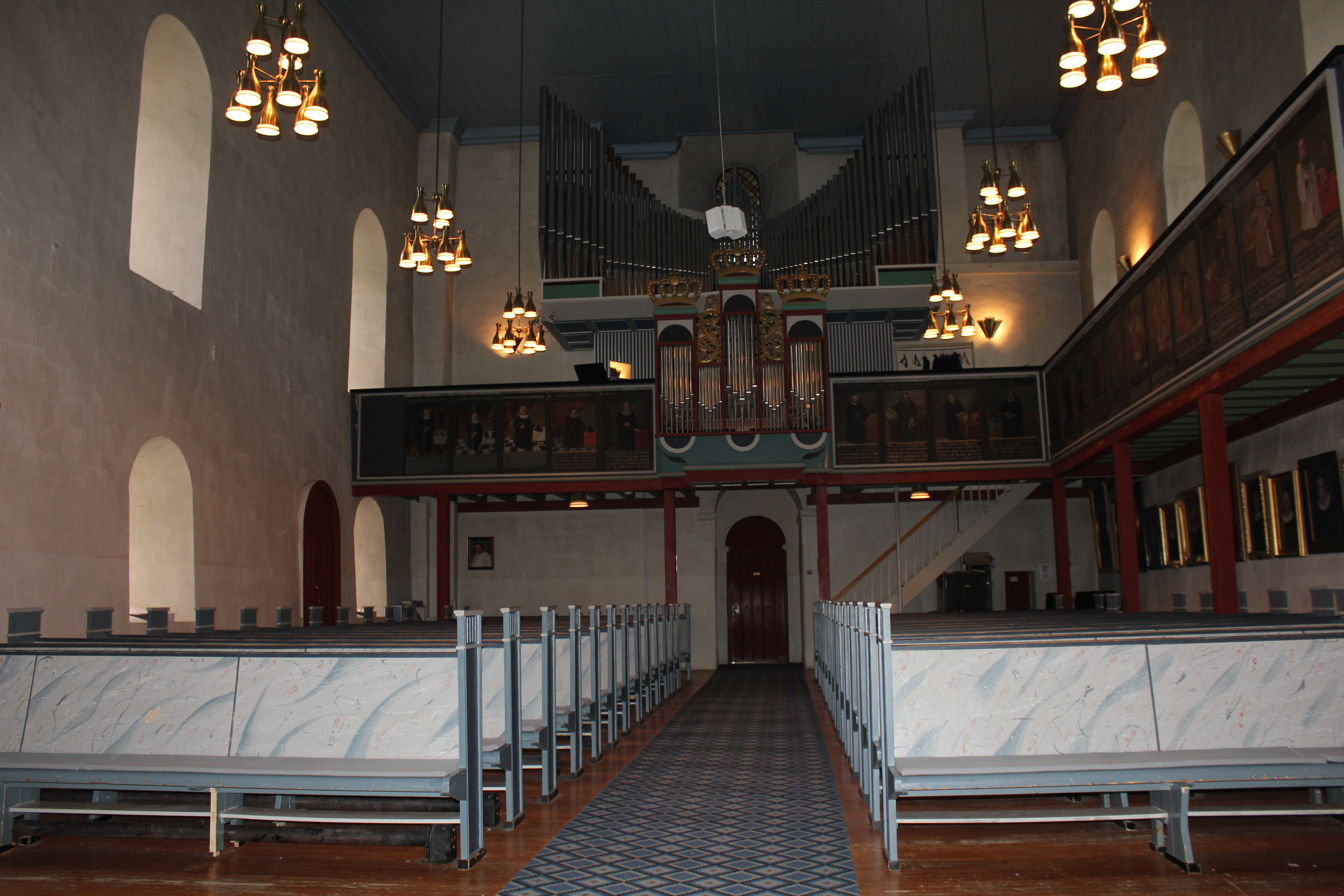
Interior of Hoff church

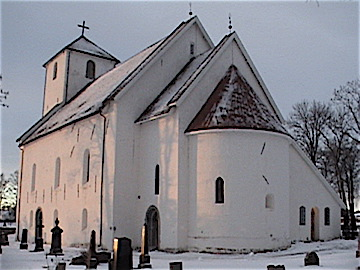
Hoff Kirke in winter

== See also ==
- List of churches in Hamar

== Other sources ==
- Ekroll, Øystein (1997). Med kleber og kalk, Norsk steinbyggning i mellomalderen 1050—1550 (in Norwegian). Oslo. ISBN 8252147542.
