= Sletta, Norway =

Village in Østre Toten Municipality, Norway

Sletta
- Village
- Interactive map of Sletta
- Location within Innlandet Location within Norway
- Coordinates: 60.69312°N 10.7767°E
- Country: Norway
- Region: Eastern Norway
- County: Innlandet
- District: Toten
- Municipality: Østre Toten Municipality

Area
  - Total: 0.34 km^{2} (0.13 sq mi)
- Elevation: 324 m (1,063 ft)

Population (2024)
  - Total: 305
  - Density: 897/km^{2} (2,320/sq mi)
- Time zone: UTC+01:00 (CET)
  - Summer (DST): UTC+02:00 (CEST)
- Post Code: 2850 Lena

Sletta is a village in Østre Toten Municipality in Innlandet county, Norway. The village is located about 3 kilometres (1.9 mi) to the northwest of the village of Lena and about 5 kilometres (3.1 mi) to the west of the village of Kapp.

The 0.34-square-kilometre (84-acre) village has a population (2024) of 305 and a population density of 897 inhabitants per square kilometre (2,320/sq mi).
