= Hans Laurits Olsen Hammerstad =

Norwegian politician

Hans Laurits Olsen Hammerstad (6 August 1840 – 15 May 1877) was a Norwegian politician.

He was elected to the Norwegian Parliament in 1877, representing the constituency of Kristians Amt. He only served one term.

He was also involved in local politics, and was the mayor of Østre Toten Municipality from 1876 to 1877. He was succeeded by Martin Adolf Andersen.

He worked as a farmer.
