= Ole Larsen Hammerstad =

Norwegian politician

Ole Larsen Hammerstad (29 January 1817 – 8 August 1873) was a Norwegian politician.

He was elected to the Norwegian Parliament in 1857, representing the constituency of Christians Amt. He was re-elected in 1859, not in 1861, but returned in 1865 and 1868.

He was also involved in local politics, and was the mayor of Østre Toten Municipality from 1848 to 1849, 1856 to 1861 and 1870 to 1871. He was the second mayor of his municipality, after Peder Jensen Fauchald.

He worked as a farmer. A street in Oslo, Hammerstads gate, has been named for him.
