= Eduard Bøckmann =

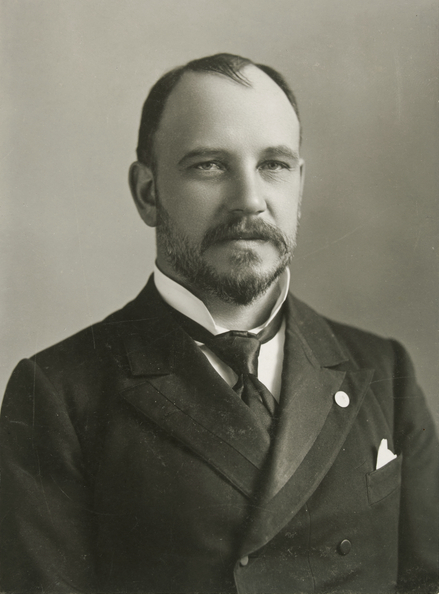
Eduard Bøckmann (about 1895)

Eduard Bøckmann (8 March 1849 – 8 August 1927) was a Norwegian American ophthalmologist, physician and inventor.

== Background ==
Eduard Bøckmann was born in Østre Toten Municipality in Christians county, Norway. He was the son of Daniel Peter Barth Bøckmann (1793–1877) and Dina Severine Dreier (1811–1885). He enrolled as a student in 1867 and graduated with the cand.med. degree in 1874. He married Anne Sophie Dorothea Gill in Kaupanger in September 1875. He settled in Bergen and worked there until 1886. During this period, in 1882 he took the dr.med. degree on the thesis Om den ved Trigeminusanæsthesi forekommende Hornhindelidelses Væsen og Aarsager. The ailments he described often occurred in leprosy patients. Bøckmann had spent a year from 1880 to 1881 as a physician at a lepra institution. His was the first Norwegian doctoral thesis in medicine whose research had been conducted outside the proximity of the University of Kristiania. Also, in Bergen he involved himself in the local medical society, Bergens Medicinske Selskap. In 1884 he co-founded the journal Medicinsk Revue, which existed until 1939.

== Career ==
In 1886, Bøckmann immigrated to the United States, reportedly seeking "grander conditions". He settled in St. Paul, Minnesota, and socialized with the many Norwegian immigrants in that area. In 1887 he invited Gerhard Armauer Hansen from Norway, who resided and researched in Bøckmann's premises. He had a practice as an ophthalmologist and surgeon, and from 1898 to 1908 he was a professor of clinical ophthalmology at Hamline University. He presided over the local Ramsey County Medical Society in 1899, and co-founded the journal St. Paul Medical Journal in 1898. In the 1890s he invented two types of autoclave, one of them stationary and the other a portable model for military use. He participated in the Spanish–American War in 1898, leading a field hospital in Jacksonville, Florida for three months. He also invented a new type of catgut, which came into mass production in 1901.

In 1897, the library of the Ramsey County Medical Society was established when Bøckmann donated the profits from his inventions. He also guaranteed the St. Paul Medical Journal financially. In 1901 he donated a book collection to the Ramsey County Medical Society library. He decided that proceedings from the sale of the catgut business should be used for a foundation to fund the library. The sale took place long after his death in 1959, and the library was named after Bøckmann. An inventory of the papers of Bøckmann is maintained at the Minnesota Historical Society. The materials, which are written in both English and Norwegian, include correspondence, certificates and awards, photographs, clippings, and authored papers.

Bøckmann also led a fundraiser among Norwegian-Americans at the University of Kristiania centennial anniversary in 1911. For this, he received an honorary degree there. He was also proclaimed a Commander of the Royal Norwegian Order of St. Olav, having been a Knight of the Order since 1907.

Bøckmann died in 1927 after suffering a heart attack at the home of his son, Egil Boeckmann, in Dellwood, Minnesota.

== Selected works ==
- Some Remarks about Asepsis in Military Service (1895)
- The Ramsey County Medical Society: Its Past, Present, and Future (1900)
