= Martin Adolf Andersen =

Norwegian politician (1844–1927)

Martin Adolf Andersen (17 January 1844 – 21 December 1927) was a Norwegian farmer and politician for the Liberal Party.

He was elected to the Norwegian Parliament in 1889, representing the constituency of Kristians Amt. He only served one term.

He was also involved in local politics, serving as mayor of Østre Toten Municipality from 1878 to 1893. He succeeded Hans Laurits Olsen Hammerstad and was succeeded by Peder Madsen Wang.
