= Eilert Waldemar Preben Ramm =

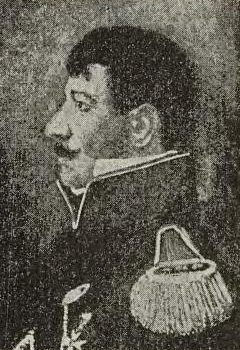
- Born: 4 May 1769; Furnes, Norway
- Died: 15 March 1837 (aged 67)
- Occupation: military officer
- Known for: representative at the Norwegian Constitutional Assembly

Eilert Waldemar Preben Ramm (4 May 1769 – 15 March 1837) was a Norwegian military officer and representative at the Norwegian Constitutional Assembly in 1814.

== Background ==
Eilert Ramm was born at the village of Furnes in Hedmark county, Norway (in the present-day Ringsaker Municipality). Ramm first joined the Zealand Light Dragon Regiment (sjællandske lette dragonregimentet ) in 1787. He rose through the ranks, and was later First Lieutenant and Captain of the cavalry in 1808.

== Career ==
He represented Søndenfjeldske Dragon-Regiment at the Norwegian Constituent Assembly which was held at Eidsvoll Manor in 1814. He was one of the two representative from Søndenfjeldske Dragon-Regiment together with Peder Paulsen Balke. He belonged to the independence party (Selvstendighetspartiet).

== Family life ==
Eilert Waldemar Preben Ramm was married twice. He was the grandfather of Carl With, Commanding General of the Norwegian Army and great-grandfather of the artist Gabriel Kielland.

== Related reading ==
- Holme Jørn (2014) De kom fra alle kanter - Eidsvollsmennene og deres hus (Oslo: Cappelen Damm) ISBN 978-82-02-44564-5
