= Atle Ørbeck Sørheim =

Norwegian veterinarian and civil servant (born 1933)

Atle Ørbeck Sørheim (9 December 1933 – 15 April 2024) was a Norwegian veterinarian and civil servant.

He was born in Østre Toten Municipality, finished his secondary education in 1953 and graduated with the cand.med.vet. degree in 1959. He ran his own veterinary office from 1959 to 1962, was a research assistant at the Norwegian School of Veterinary Science from 1962 to 1964, was municipal veterinarian in Vestre Toten Municipality from 1964 to 1965, and worked in Kenya for the Norwegian Agency for Development Cooperation from 1965 to 1969. He worked in the Norwegian Ministry of Agriculture from 1969 to 1979, the Norwegian Directorate for Health from 1979 to 1988 and was the director of the Norwegian State Food Authority from 1988 to 1998.

He was appointed a Knight First Class of the Royal Norwegian Order of St. Olav in 1999.

Sørheim died on 15 April 2024, 90 years old.

Civic offices
New post	Director of the Norwegian State Food Authority; 1988–1998	Succeeded by
