= Niels Fredriksen Dyhren =

Norwegian farmer and non-commissioner military officer

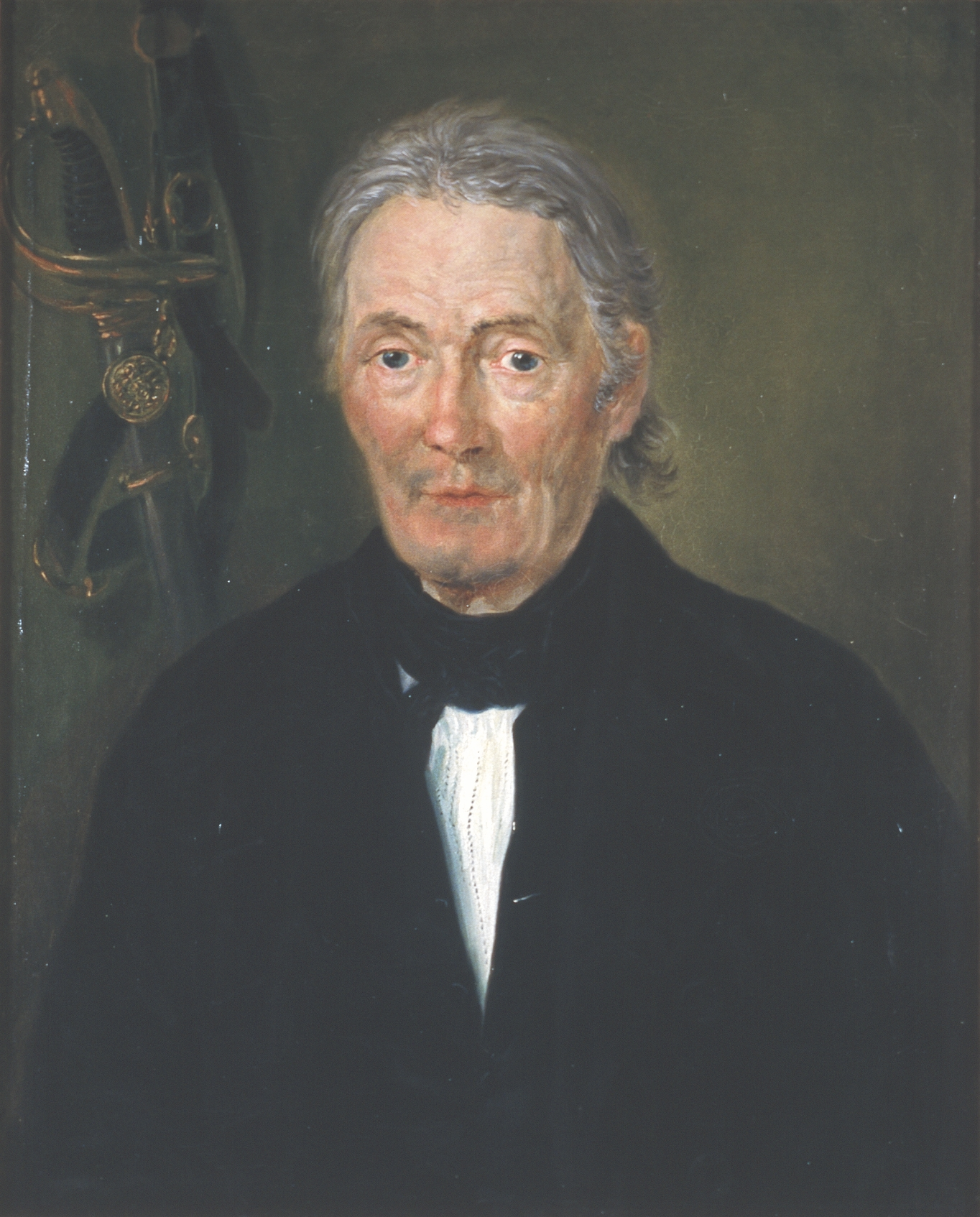
Niels Fredriksen Dyhren by Matthias Stoltenberg. From DigitaltMuseum

Niels Fredriksen Dyhren (16 February 1778 – 25 August 1866) was a Norwegian farmer and non-commissioner military officer. He served as a representative at the Norwegian Constitutional Assembly in 1814.

Niels Fredriksen Dyhren was born on the Dyhren farm in Østre Toten in Oppland, Norway. In 1800, he became a soldier with Jegerkorpset-Akershus Regiment and 1801 Corporal in the regimental artillery company. In 1814, he was a member of the Norske Jæger Corps and was a Corporal in Valderske skarpskytterbataillon. His time in service included the period of the Napoleonic Wars (1807-1809 and 1814).

He represented Norske Jæger Corps at the Norwegian Constituent Assembly at Eidsvoll Manor in 1814 together with Palle Fleischer. At Eidsvoll, he supported the position of the independence party (Selvstendighetspartiet).

== Related Reading ==
- Holme Jørn (2014) De kom fra alle kanter - Eidsvollsmennene og deres hus (Oslo: Cappelen Damm) ISBN 978-82-02-44564-5
