= Lena, Norway =

Village in Østre Toten Municipality, Norway

Lena
- Village
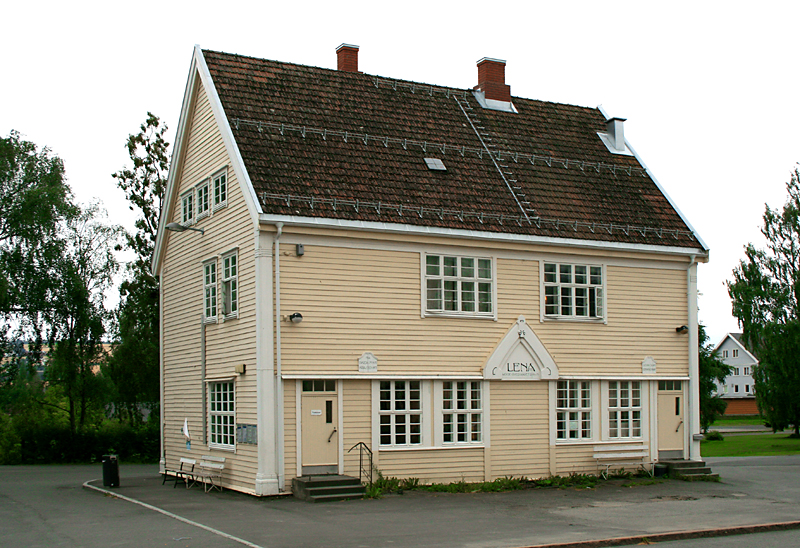
- View of the village railway station, Lena Station
- Interactive map of Lena
- Coordinates: 60.67391°N 10.81317°E
- Country: Norway
- Region: Eastern Norway
- County: Innlandet
- District: Toten
- Municipality: Østre Toten Municipality

Area
  - Total: 1.52 km^{2} (0.59 sq mi)
- Elevation: 230 m (750 ft)

Population (2024)
  - Total: 1,393
  - Density: 916/km^{2} (2,370/sq mi)
- Time zone: UTC+01:00 (CET)
  - Summer (DST): UTC+02:00 (CEST)
- Post Code: 2850 Lena

Lena is the administrative centre of Østre Toten Municipality in Innlandet county, Norway, about 5 kilometres (3.1 mi) to the southwest of the village of Kapp and lake Mjøsa.

The 1.52-square-kilometre (380-acre) village has a population (2024) of 1,393 and a population density of 916 inhabitants per square kilometre (2,370/sq mi). The urban area of Lena also includes part of the village of Kraby, just to the east.

Lena is a commercial center for the municipality and is surrounded by mostly farmland. In central Lena, there are several shops and three schools (upper secondary, lower secondary, and primary schools). Toten folk high school is also located in Lena. The distance from Lena to Oslo is roughly 85 kilometres (53 mi) (as the crow flies) and 120 kilometres (75 mi) by road. The town of Gjøvik is 18 kilometres (11 mi) away and Norway's largest airport, Oslo Airport, Gardermoen (OSL), is 80 kilometres (50 mi) by road. The villages of Lensbygda and Skreia lie to the southeast, Kolbu is to the southwest, Sletta and Nordlia are to the northwest, and Kapp is to the northeast.

== Name ==
The village name comes from the local river, Lenaelva, which flows from Totenåsen (a hilly, forested area north of Hurdal Municipality and Hadeland). The river travels through the villages of Lena and Skreia to lake Mjøsa. In 1902, when the railway station was built, the station was named Lena (after the river), and since then the village area that grew up around the station became known as Lena. Lena Station was located along the Skreia Line from 1902 until its closure in 1987.
