= Kraby =

Village in Østre Toten Municipality, Norway

- Village
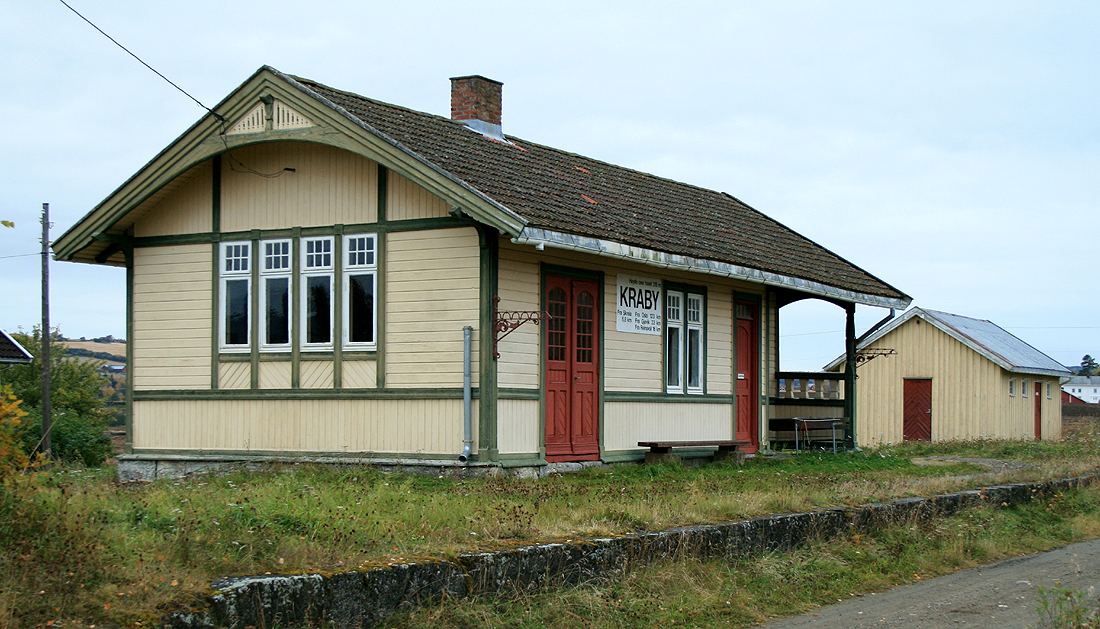
- View of the village railway station, Kraby Station
- Interactive map of Kraby
- Location within Innlandet Location within Norway
- Coordinates: 60.67685°N 10.85426°E
- Country: Norway
- Region: Eastern Norway
- County: Innlandet
- District: Toten
- Municipality: Østre Toten Municipality
- Elevation: 225 m (738 ft)
- Time zone: UTC+01:00 (CET)
  - Summer (DST): UTC+02:00 (CEST)
- Post Code: 2850 Lena

Kraby is a village in Østre Toten Municipality in Innlandet county, Norway. The village is located about 2 kilometres (1.2 mi) east of the village of Lena along Norwegian County Road 33. The village is named after the local farmsteads named Kraby. Hoff Church is located in the village.

Kraby became a stopping point with the opening of the Skreiabanen railway line in 1902, and the village name Kraby came into use. A post office (2855 Kraby) was opened next to the station in 1907. In addition, some small businesses opened in Kraby. In 1916, the Festiviteten was opened, now known as Teten. After the Second World War, further building took place in Kraby. Along the highway near the historic stone church, Hoff Church, the Fostadjordet residential area was built. In the 1980s, the municipality built an industrial area called Krabyskogen, a short distance south of Kraby.

The railway station building at Kraby was designed by the architect Paul Armin Due. It was staffed from the start in 1902, but it has not been operational since 1964. This was due to the drop in passenger numbers on the Skreiabanen line. In 1975, the station and the post office closed. After a period of standing empty, the station building was restored, and in 2002, the building won the Fortidsminneforeningen's protection prize.
