= Balke Church =

Church in Innlandet, Norway

- Balke kirke
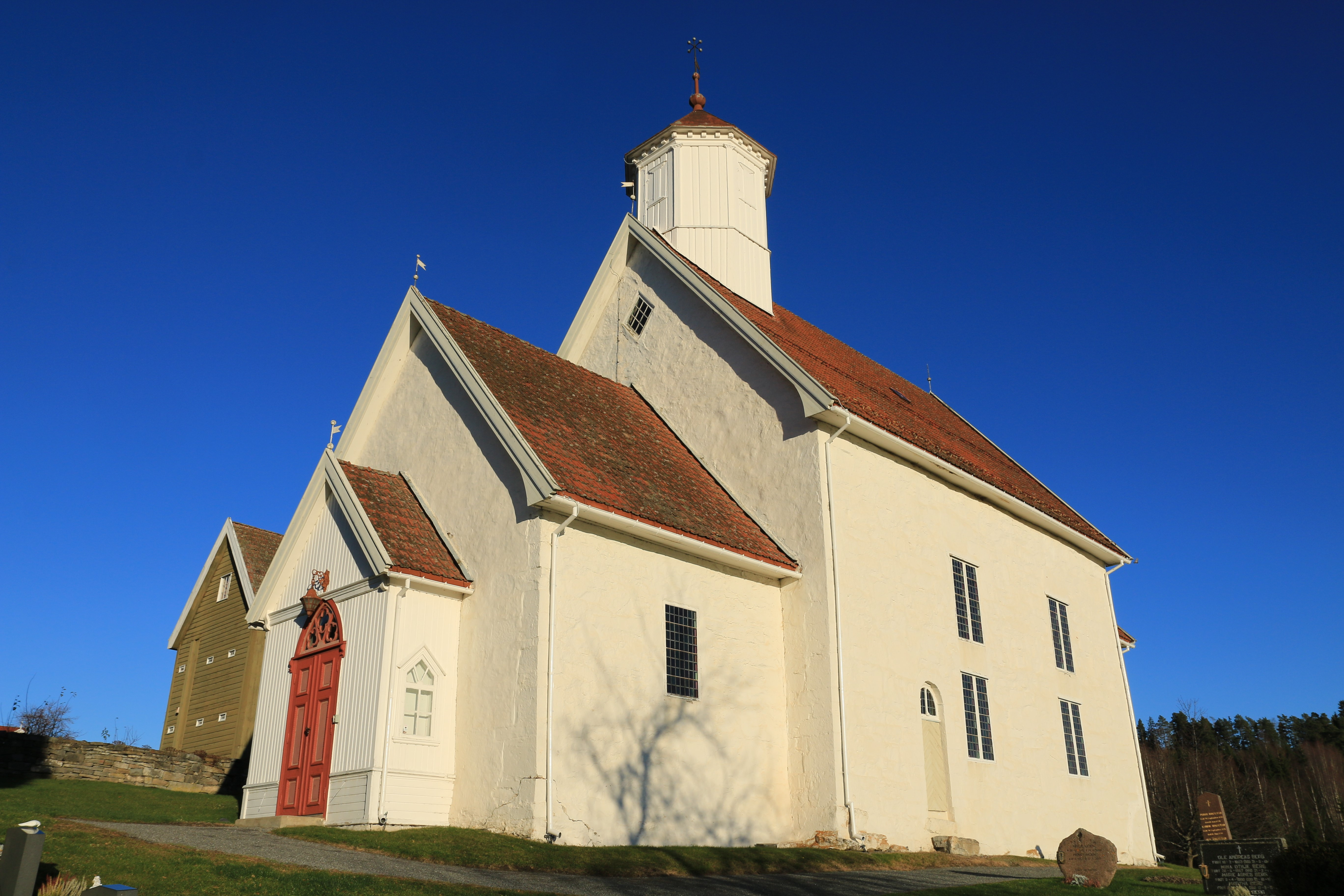
- View of the church
- Balke Church
- 60°40′06″N 10°57′00″E
- Location: Østre Toten, Innlandet
- Country: Norway
- Denomination: Church of Norway
- Previous denomination: Catholic Church
- Churchmanship: Evangelical Lutheran

History
- Status: Parish church
- Founded: c. 1170
- Consecrated: c. 1170

Architecture
- Functional status: Active
- Architectural type: Long church
- Completed: c. 1170 (856 years ago)

Specifications
- Capacity: 290
- Materials: Stone

Administration
- Diocese: Hamar bispedømme
- Deanery: Toten prosti
- Parish: Balke
- Norwegian Cultural Heritage Site
- Type: Church
- Status: Automatically protected
- ID: 83845

Balke Church (Norwegian: Balke kirke) is a parish church of the Church of Norway in Østre Toten Municipality in Innlandet county, Norway. It is located in the village of Skreia. It is one of the churches for the Balke parish which is part of the Toten prosti (deanery) in the Diocese of Hamar. The white, stone church was built in a long church design around the year 1170 using plans drawn up by an unknown architect. The church seats about 290 people.

== History ==
The earliest existing historical records of the church date back to the year 1327, but that was not the year of construction. The medieval stone church was built around the year 1170. The church has Romanesque, Norman and early Gothic style. The nave is rectangular and the chancel has a semi-circular apse on its east end.

In 1714, the old church porch was torn down and the nave was extended to the west to make the nave larger. This extension is still referred to as the "new church". The old nave had no windows on the north side, while the new church has windows on both the north side and the south side. A new church porch was built on the west end of the newly enlarged nave and a sacristy was also built on the north side of the chancel. There is also an octagonal tower (from 1822) on the roof near the west end of the nave.

The altarpiece is often called the Mary tablet and is unique in Norway. The artist community at Balke church has given names to the Balkeskolen. A crucifix and a number of saint figures from the church can be found in a museum in Oslo.

== Media gallery ==
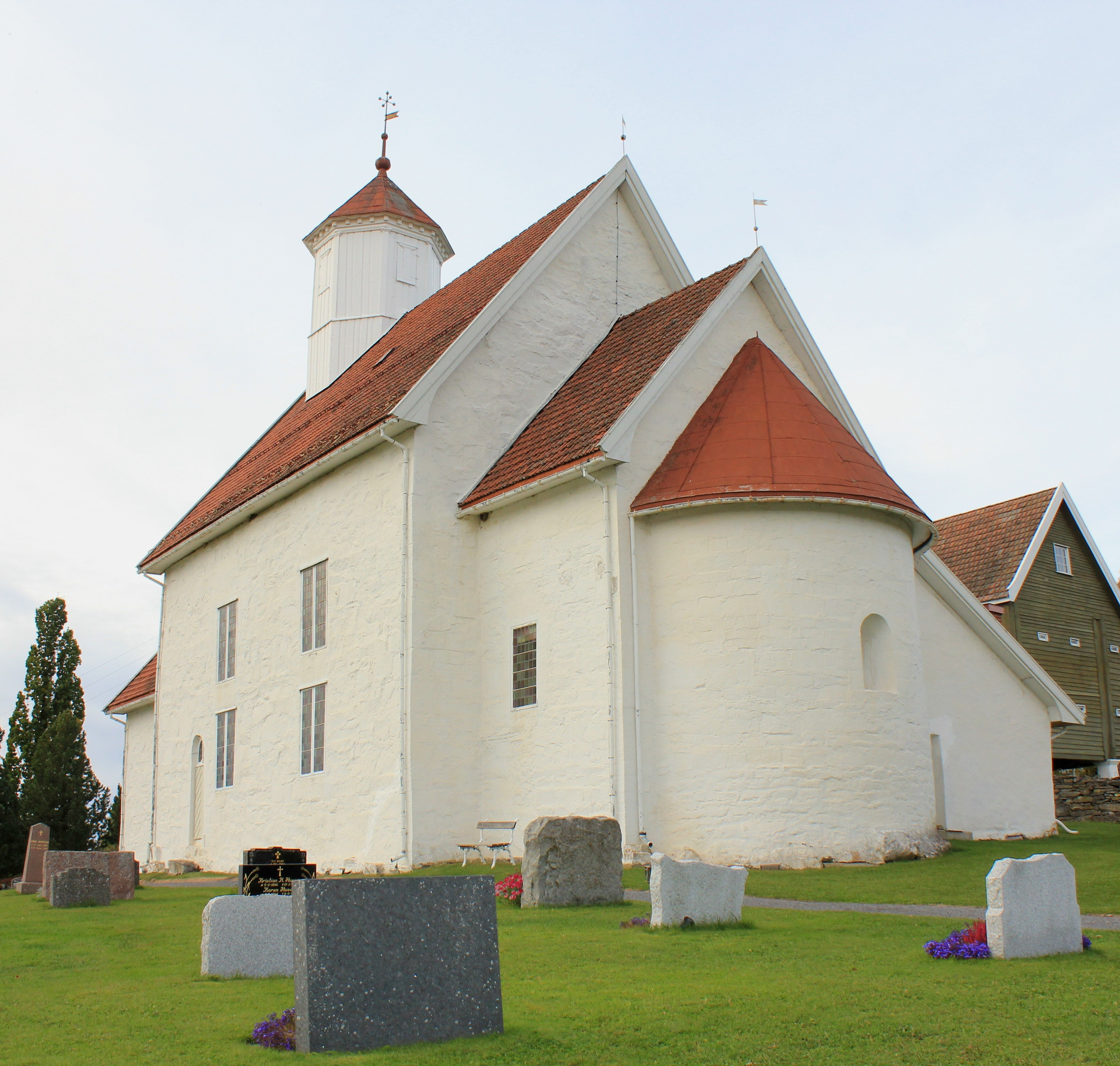

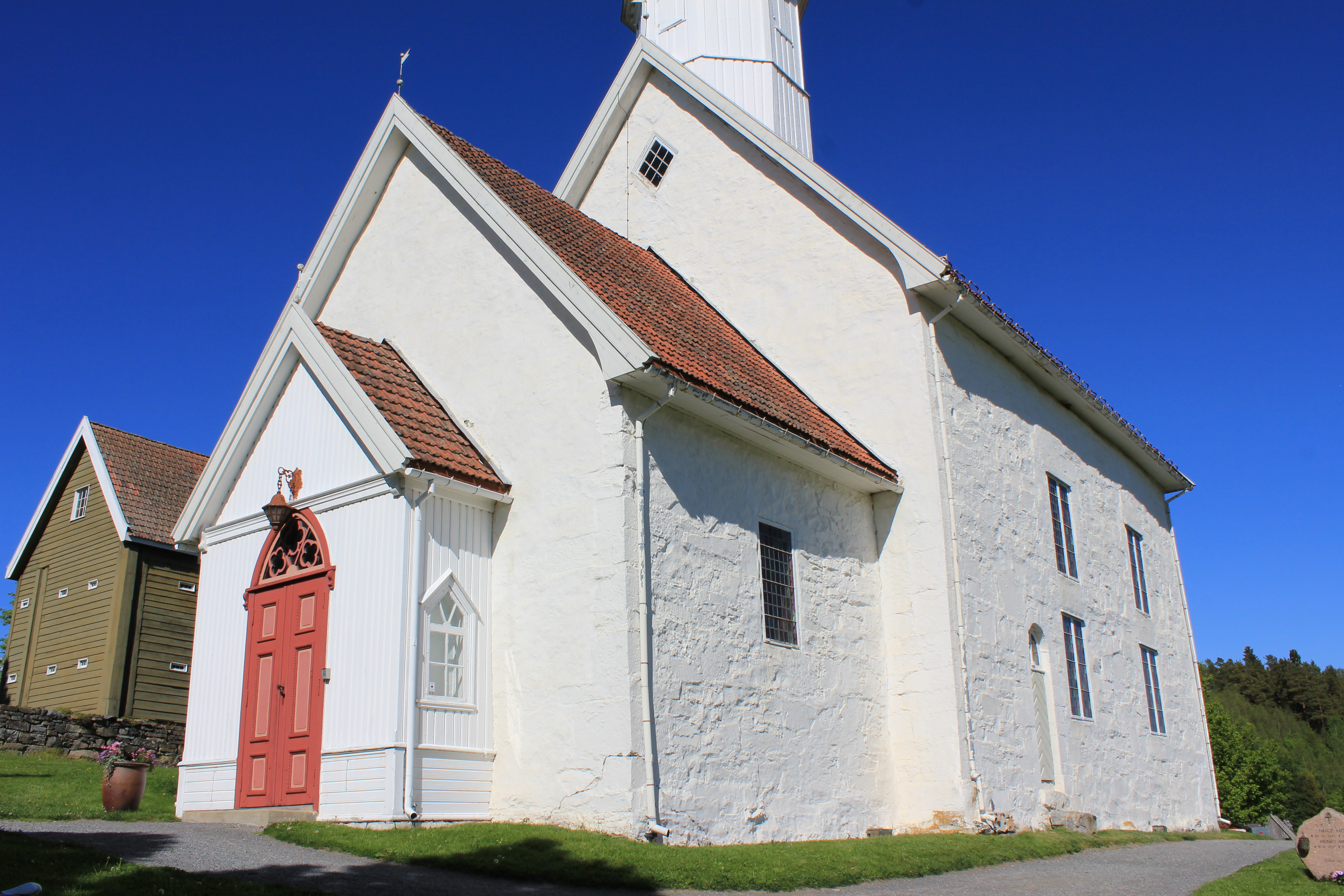

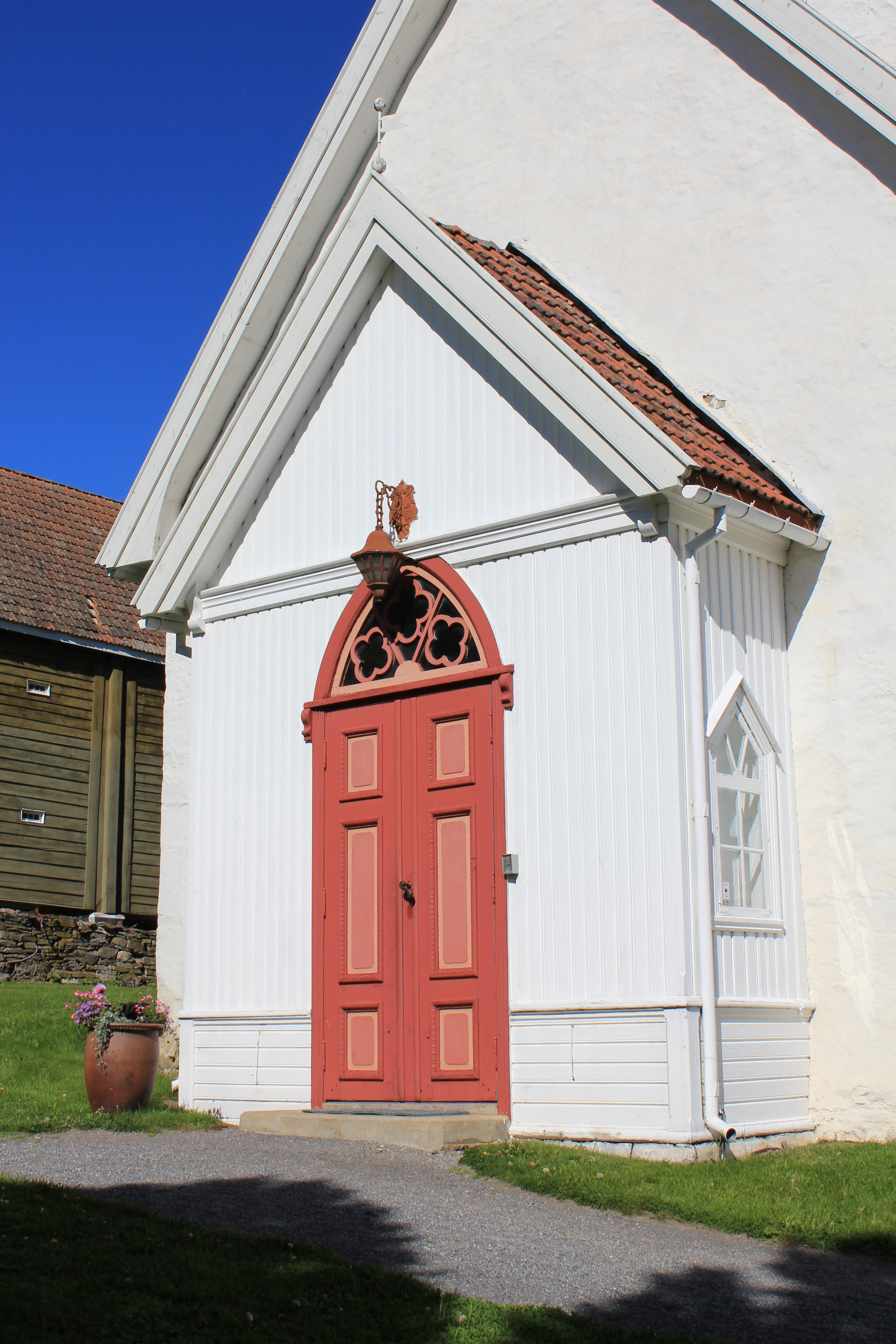

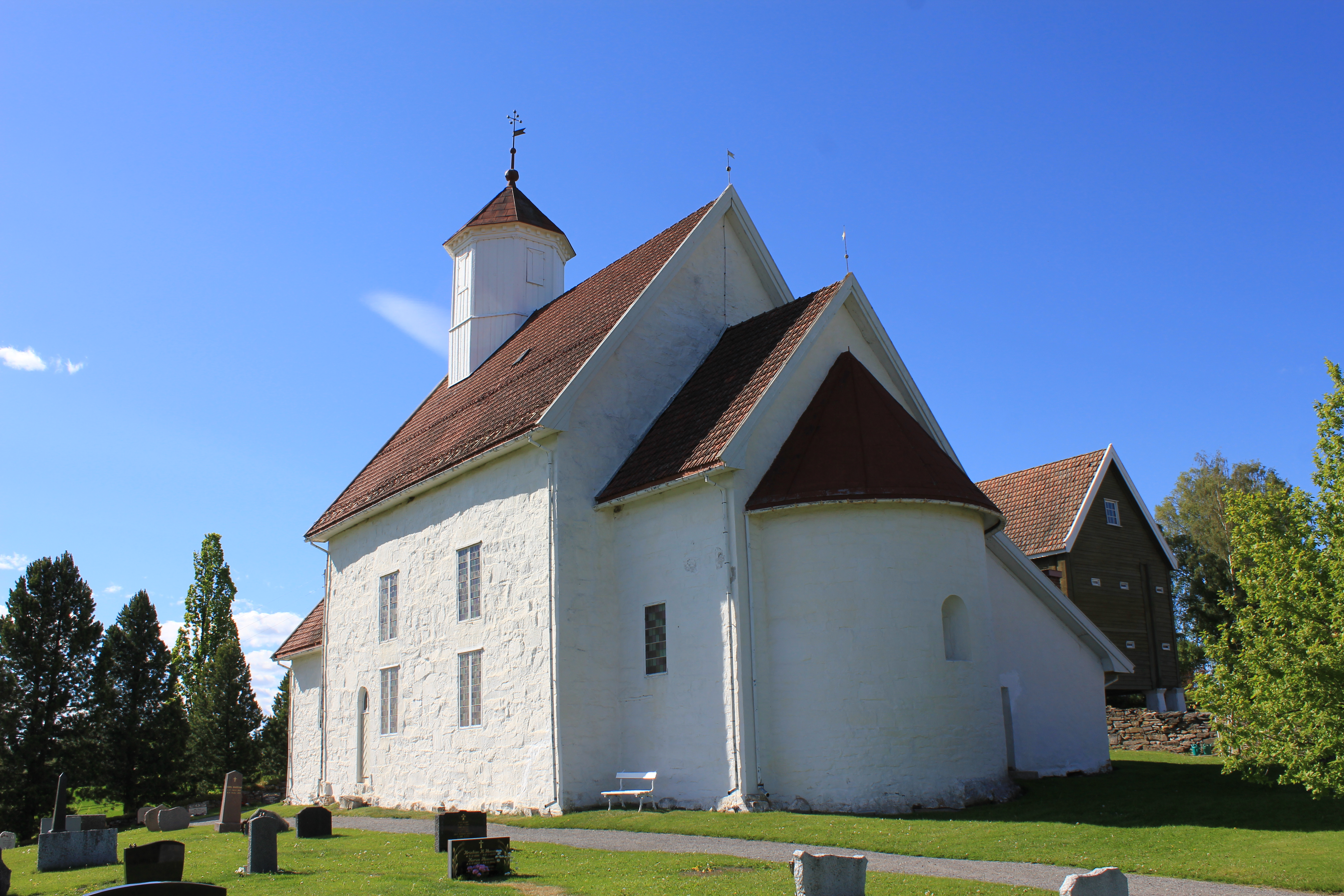

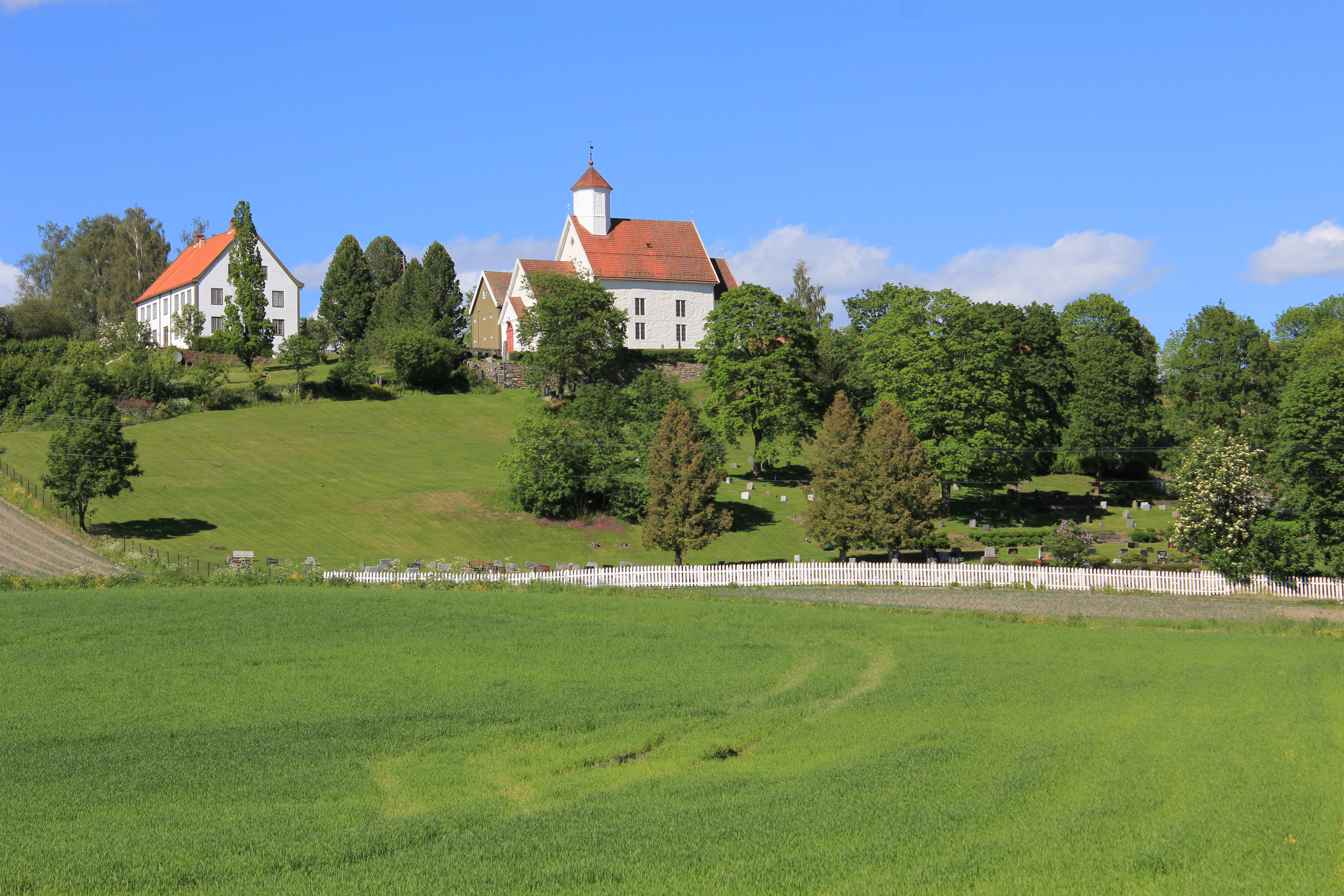

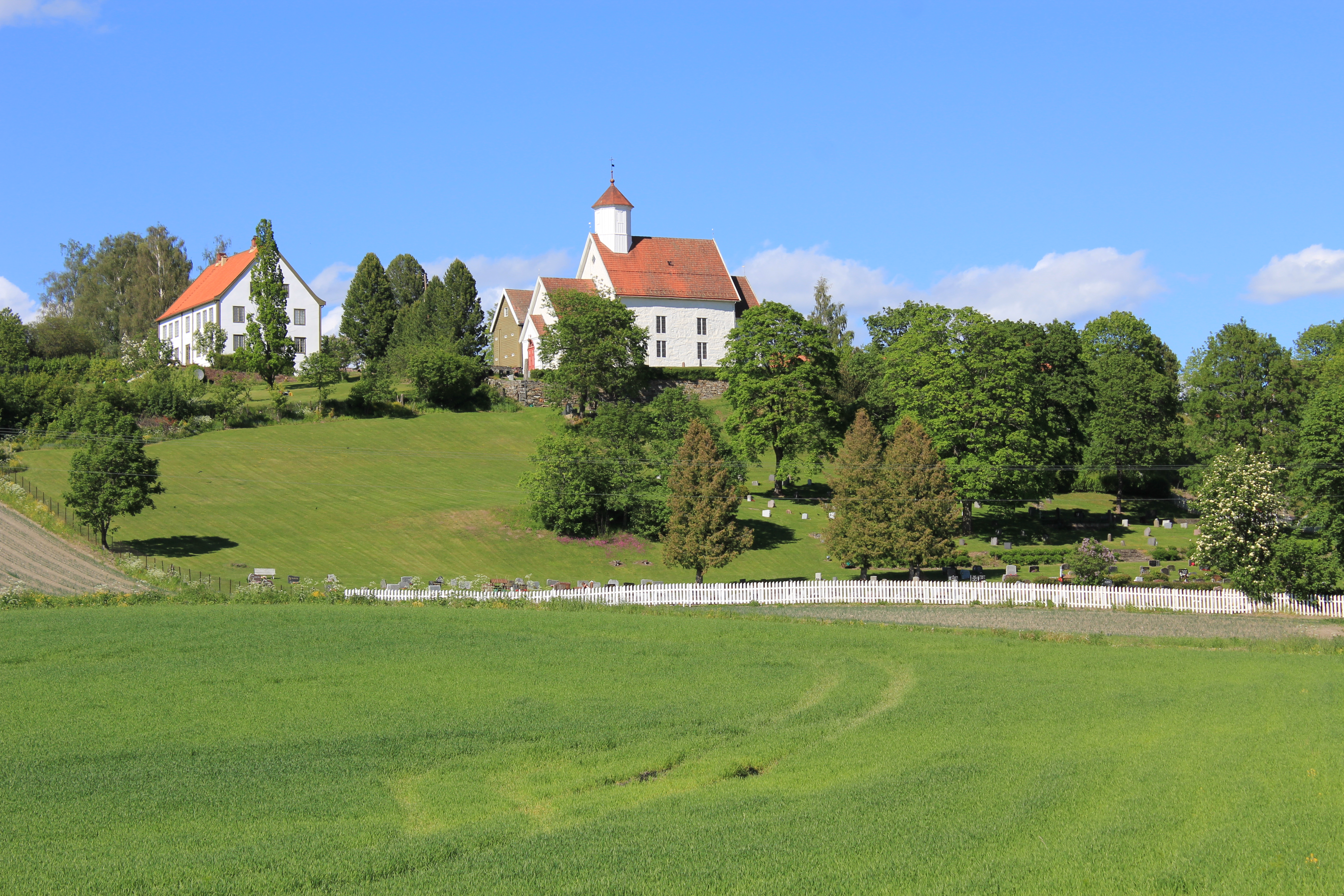

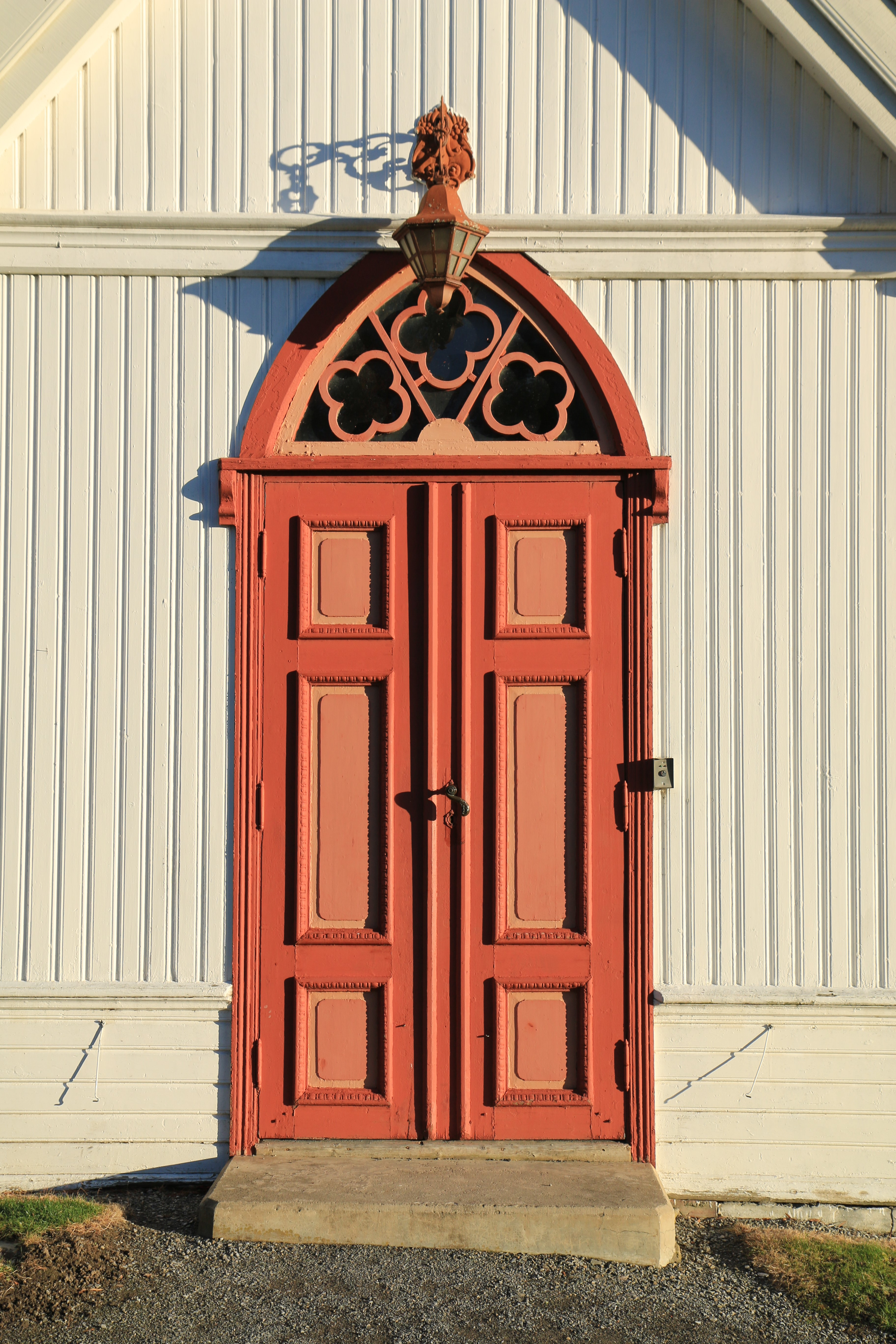

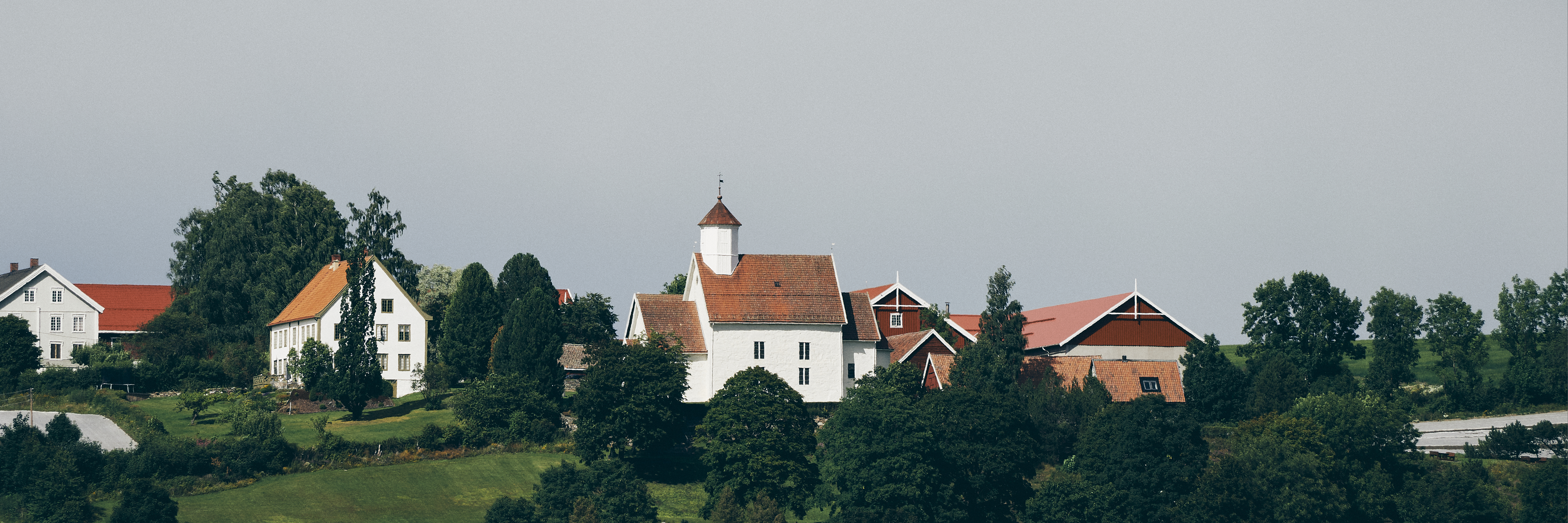

== See also ==
- List of churches in Hamar
