= Østre Toten Municipality =

Municipality in Innlandet, Norway

Østre Toten Municipality Østre Toten kommune
- Municipality
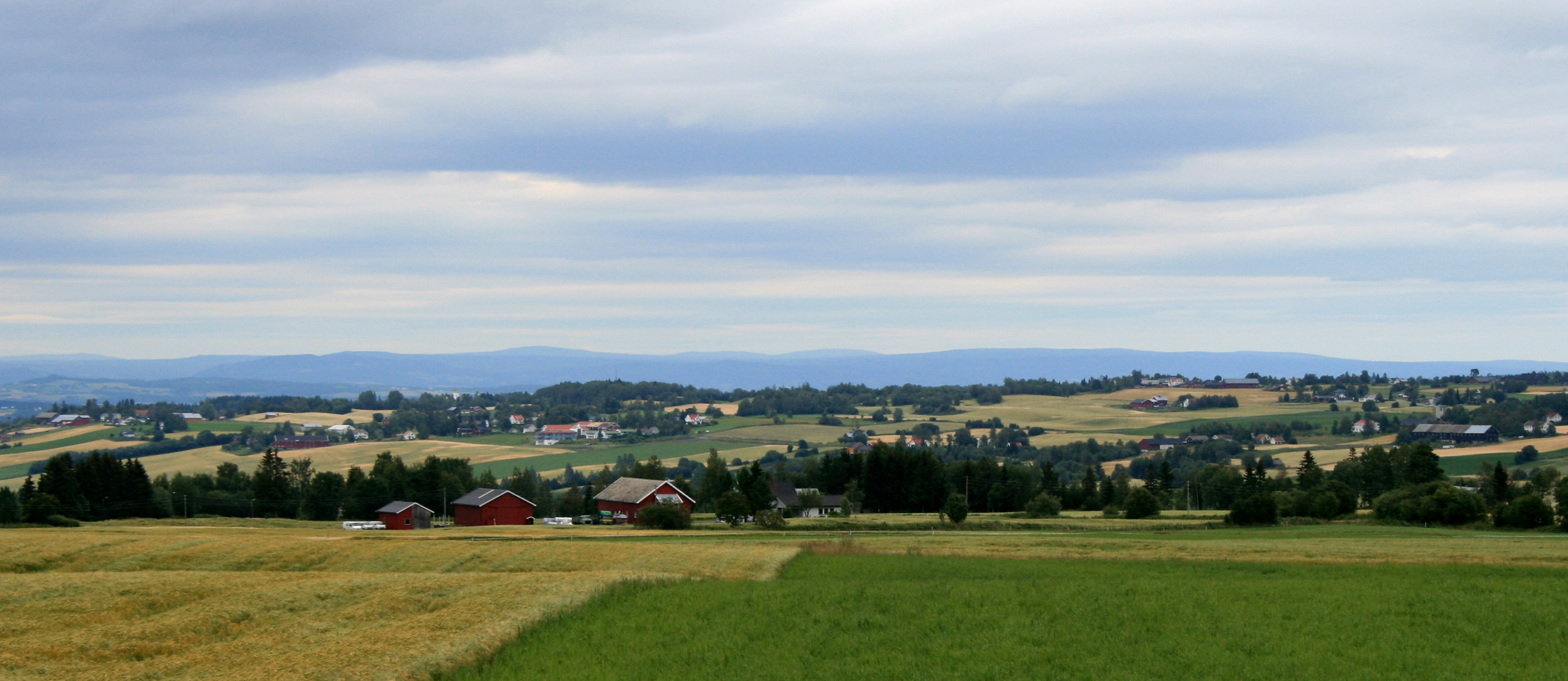
- View of Østre Toten

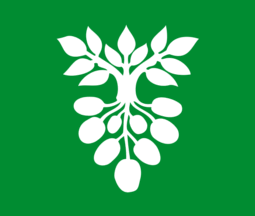
- Flag Coat of arms

- Innlandet within Norway

- Østre Toten within Innlandet
- Coordinates: 60°36′48″N 10°54′58″E
- Country: Norway
- County: Innlandet
- District: Toten
- Established: 1 Jan 1838
  - Created as: Formannskapsdistrikt
- Administrative centre: Lena

Government
  - Mayor (2019): Bror Helgestad (Sp)

Area
  - Total: 562.52 km^{2} (217.19 sq mi)
  - Land: 485.43 km^{2} (187.43 sq mi)
  - Water: 77.09 km^{2} (29.76 sq mi) 13.7%
  - Rank: #192 in Norway
- Highest elevation: 841.17 m (2,759.7 ft)

Population (2025)
  - Total: 14,827
  - Rank: #85 in Norway
  - Density: 26.4/km^{2} (68/sq mi)
  - Change (10 years): ▲ +0.4%
- Demonym: Østretotning

Official language
  - Norwegian form: Bokmål
- Time zone: UTC+01:00 (CET)
  - Summer (DST): UTC+02:00 (CEST)
- ISO 3166 code: NO-3442
- Website: Official website

Østre Toten is a municipality in Innlandet county, Norway. It is located in the traditional district of Toten. The administrative centre of the municipality is the village of Lena. Other villages in the municipality include Kapp, Kolbu, Kraby, Lensbygda, Nordlia, Skreia, and Sletta.

The 562.52-square-kilometre (217.19 sq mi) municipality is the 192nd largest by area out of the 357 municipalities in Norway. Østre Toten Municipality is the 85th most populous municipality in Norway with a population of 14,827. The municipality's population density is 26.4 inhabitants per square kilometre (68/sq mi) and its population has increased by 0.4% over the previous 10-year period.

== General information ==
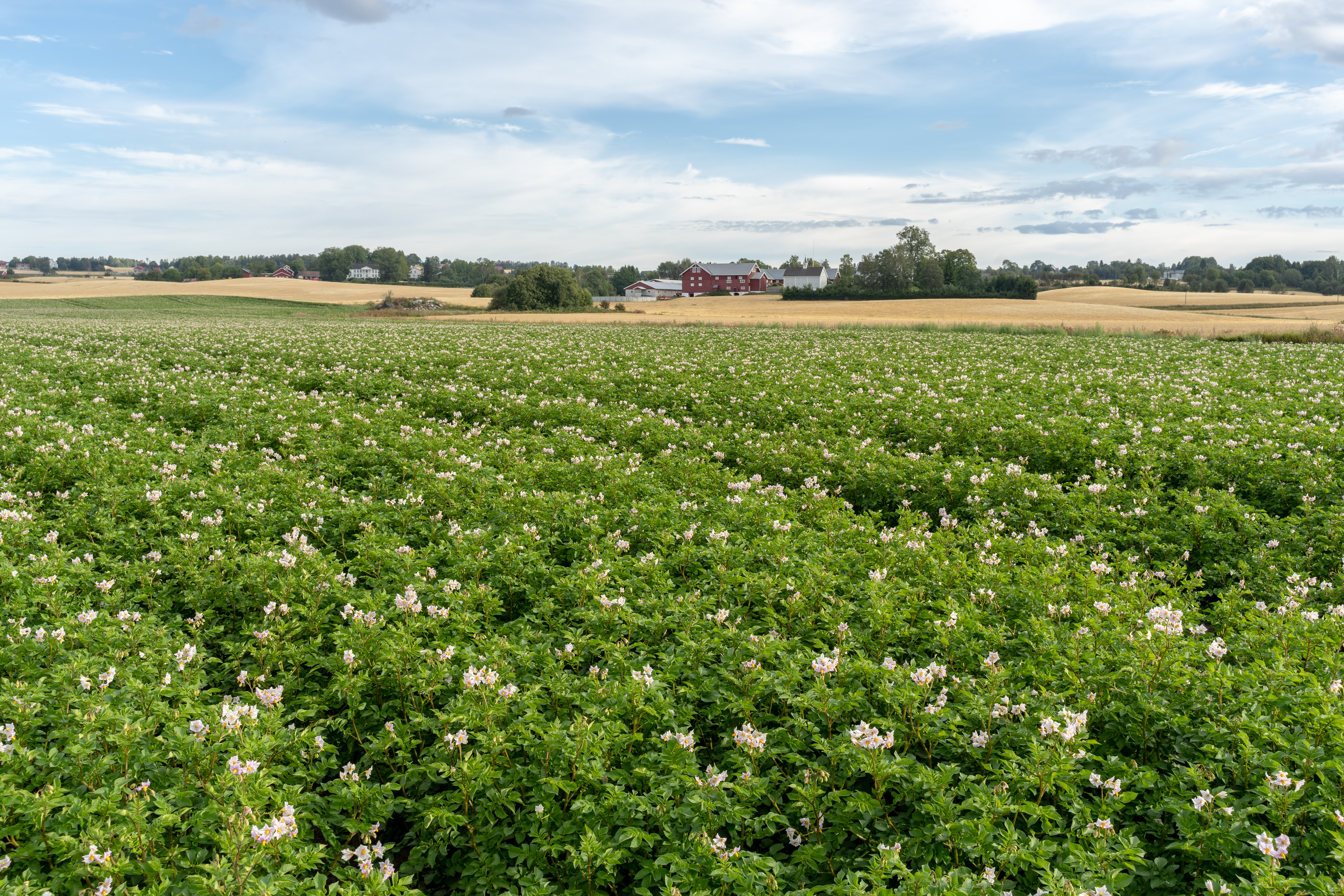
Agricultural area in Østre Toten

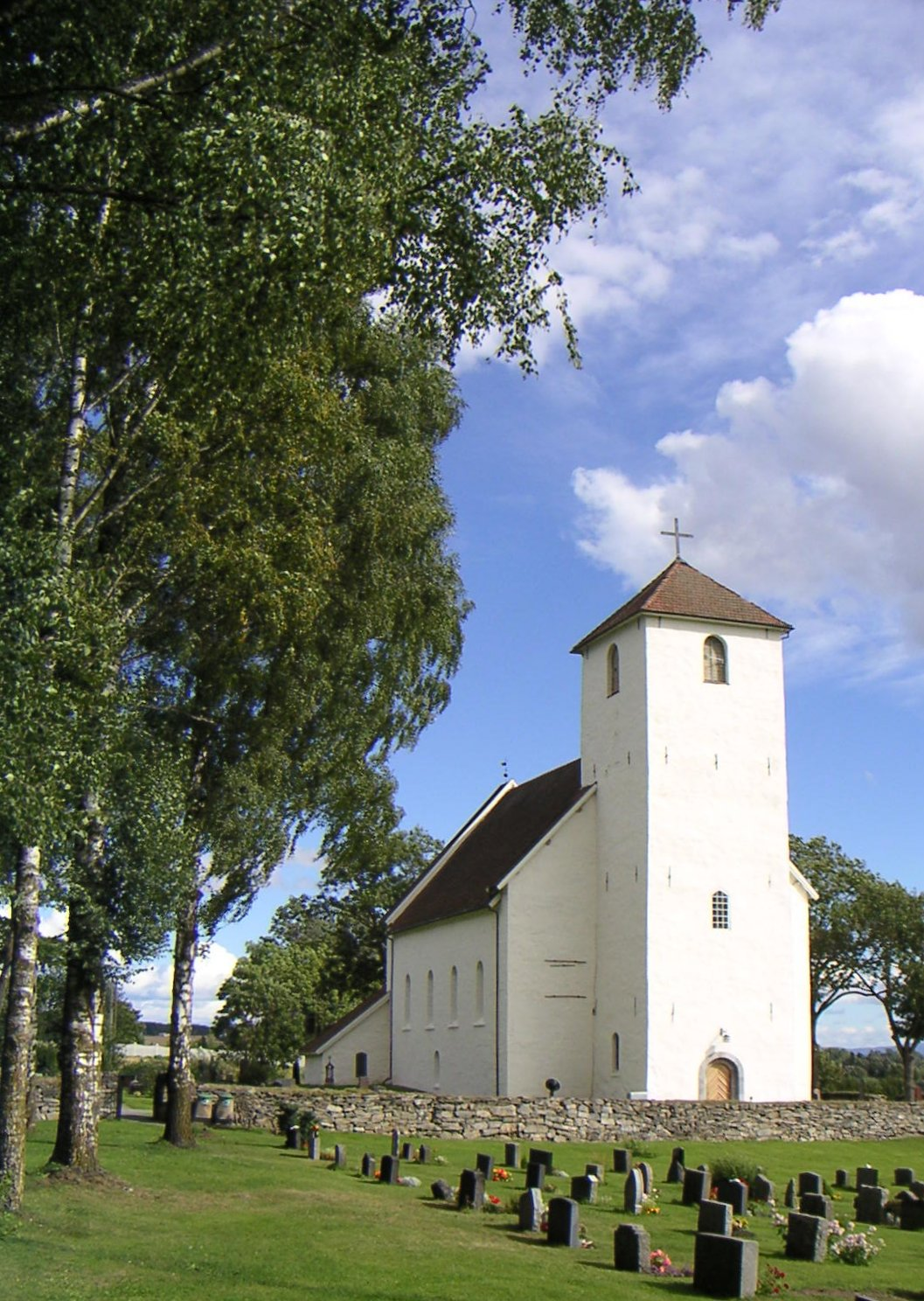
Hoff Church

The parish of Østre Toten was established as a municipality on 1 January 1838 (see formannskapsdistrikt law). On 1 January 1875, there was a minor border change between Vestre Toten Municipality and Østre Toten Municipality. On 1 January 1896, a small area of Østre Toten Municipality (population: 49) was transferred to the neighboring Vardal Municipality.

During the 1960s, there were many municipal mergers across Norway due to the work of the Schei Committee. On 1 January 1964, the neighboring Kolbu Municipality (population: 2,909) was merged with Østre Toten Municipality to form a new, larger Østre Toten Municipality.

Historically, this municipality was part of the old Oppland county. On 1 January 2020, the municipality became a part of the newly-formed Innlandet county (after Hedmark and Oppland counties were merged).

=== Etymology ===
The municipality is named Østre Toten after the district of Toten (Old Norse: Þótn). The name is identical with the word Þótn which has an uncertain meaning, but it might be from the word þóttr which means "the pleasant district" or "something one likes". The parish of Toten was divided into two parts (eastern and western) in 1825 and the first word, østre was added to signify that this was the "eastern" part, thus the name was Østre Toten which means "(the) eastern (part of) Toten".

=== Coat of arms ===
The coat of arms was granted on 27 March 1987. The official blazon is "Vert, a potato plant argent" (Norwegian: I grønt en sølv potetplante). This means the arms have a green field (background) and the charge is a potato plant. The potato plant has a tincture of argent which means it is commonly colored white, but if it is made out of metal, then silver is used. The green color in the field symbolizes the importance of agriculture in the municipality and the potato was chosen since that is a particularly important crop that is grown in the municipality. The arms were designed by Arne Løvstand. The municipal flag has the same design as the coat of arms.

=== Churches ===
The Church of Norway has five parishes (sokn) within Østre Toten Municipality. It is part of the Toten prosti (deanery) in the Diocese of Hamar.

Churches in Østre Toten Municipality
Parish (sokn)	Church name	Location of the church	Year built
Balke	Balke Church	Skreia	1170
Balke	Totenviken Church	Totenvika	1896
Hoff	Hoff Church	Kraby	c. 1175
Kapp	Kapp Church	Kapp	1939
Kolbu	Kolbu Church	Kolbu	1730
Nordlien	Nordlien Church	Nordlia	1901

== Geography ==
Østre Toten Municipality is bordered to the west by Vestre Toten Municipality, to the northwest by Gjøvik Municipality, to the northeast (across lake Mjøsa) by Ringsaker Municipality, to the east (across the lake) by Stange Municipality, to the southeast by Eidsvoll Municipality (in Akershus county), and to the south by Hurdal Municipality (also in Akershus county). The highest point in the municipality is the 841.17-metre (2,759.7 ft) tall mountain Torsæterkampen.

Settlement in Østre Toten Municipality is predominantly dispersed. In January 2015, 42.6% of the population lived in areas defined as urban settlements by Statistics Norway, compared to 81% for Norway as a whole. The urban settlements in Østre Toten are Kapp, Kolbu, Lena, Lensbygda, Nordlia, Skreia, and Sletta.

== History ==
Number of minorities (1st and 2nd generation) in Østre Toten by country of origin in 2017
Ancestry	Number
Poland	375
Lithuania	194
Bosnia-Herzegovina	76
Syria	62
Eritrea	47
Germany	46
Iraq	46
Denmark	44
Sweden	42
Russia	36

According to the sagas, Halfdan Hvitbeinn (Whiteleg) was the first Yngling in Norway. He conquered Romerike, part of Hedmark, part of Vestfold, and Toten. He was killed in Toten around the year 740.

In 1021, according to saga, King Olaf (reigned 1015–1028) converted Toten to Christianity. Also, King Håkon IV (reigned 1217–1263) came to Toten around the year 1226 to settle local unrest.

Christian II (1481–1559) was a Danish monarch and King of Denmark and Norway from 1513 to 1523 and also the King of Sweden from 1520 to 1521, under the Kalmar Union. Prior to becoming king, Duke Christian was sent to Norway in 1506 by John II (also called Hans), King of Norway (1483–1513) to take charge of the kingdom. In 1507, he became aware of a revolt in Hedmark. In early 1508, he took a force there, routing the rebellion. He then rowed across lake Mjøsa to Toten, capturing residents, imprisoning them in the vaulted cellar of the rectory in Østre Toten and torturing them there. As a result, he determined that Bishop Karl of Hamar had been behind the rebellion. With Bishop Karl as his captive, he was able to suppress the unrest.

Toten was a part of Akershus county until 1756, when it became part of Christians county. Lauritz Weidemann, Corporal Peder Balke, and Niels Dyhren from Toten attended the 1814 constitutional convention at Eidsvold.

== Government ==
Østre Toten Municipality is responsible for primary education (through 10th grade), outpatient health services, senior citizen services, welfare and other social services, zoning, economic development, and municipal roads and utilities. The municipality is governed by a municipal council of directly elected representatives. The mayor is indirectly elected by a vote of the municipal council. The municipality is under the jurisdiction of the Vestoppland og Valdres District Court and the Eidsivating Court of Appeal.

=== Municipal council ===
The municipal council (Kommunestyre) of Østre Toten Municipality is made up of 29 representatives that are elected to four year terms. The tables below show the current and historical composition of the council by political party.

Østre Toten kommunestyre 2023–2027
Party name (in Norwegian)	Number of representatives
Labour Party (Arbeiderpartiet)	11
Progress Party (Fremskrittspartiet)	4
Conservative Party (Høyre)	4
Pensioners' Party (Pensjonistpartiet)	1
Red Party (Rødt)	1
Centre Party (Senterpartiet)	6
Socialist Left Party (Sosialistisk Venstreparti)	1
Liberal Party (Venstre)	1
Total number of members:	29

Østre Toten kommunestyre 2019–2023
Party name (in Norwegian)	Number of representatives
Labour Party (Arbeiderpartiet)	11
Progress Party (Fremskrittspartiet)	2
Green Party (Miljøpartiet De Grønne)	1
Conservative Party (Høyre)	3
Red Party (Rødt)	1
Centre Party (Senterpartiet)	9
Socialist Left Party (Sosialistisk Venstreparti)	1
Liberal Party (Venstre)	1
Total number of members:	29

Østre Toten kommunestyre 2015–2019
Party name (in Norwegian)	Number of representatives
Labour Party (Arbeiderpartiet)	13
Progress Party (Fremskrittspartiet)	2
Green Party (Miljøpartiet De Grønne)	1
Conservative Party (Høyre)	4
Christian Democratic Party (Kristelig Folkeparti)	1
Pensioners' Party (Pensjonistpartiet)	1
Centre Party (Senterpartiet)	5
Liberal Party (Venstre)	2
Total number of members:	29

Østre Toten kommunestyre 2011–2015
Party name (in Norwegian)	Number of representatives
Labour Party (Arbeiderpartiet)	11
Progress Party (Fremskrittspartiet)	2
Conservative Party (Høyre)	4
Christian Democratic Party (Kristelig Folkeparti)	1
Pensioners' Party (Pensjonistpartiet)	1
Centre Party (Senterpartiet)	8
Liberal Party (Venstre)	2
Total number of members:	29

Østre Toten kommunestyre 2007–2011
Party name (in Norwegian)	Number of representatives
Labour Party (Arbeiderpartiet)	12
Progress Party (Fremskrittspartiet)	5
Conservative Party (Høyre)	2
Christian Democratic Party (Kristelig Folkeparti)	1
Pensioners' Party (Pensjonistpartiet)	1
Centre Party (Senterpartiet)	12
Socialist Left Party (Sosialistisk Venstreparti)	1
Liberal Party (Venstre)	3
Total number of members:	37

Østre Toten kommunestyre 2003–2007
Party name (in Norwegian)	Number of representatives
Labour Party (Arbeiderpartiet)	14
Progress Party (Fremskrittspartiet)	4
Conservative Party (Høyre)	2
Christian Democratic Party (Kristelig Folkeparti)	2
Pensioners' Party (Pensjonistpartiet)	1
Centre Party (Senterpartiet)	10
Socialist Left Party (Sosialistisk Venstreparti)	3
Liberal Party (Venstre)	1
Total number of members:	37

Østre Toten kommunestyre 1999–2003
Party name (in Norwegian)	Number of representatives
Labour Party (Arbeiderpartiet)	16
Progress Party (Fremskrittspartiet)	3
Conservative Party (Høyre)	3
Christian Democratic Party (Kristelig Folkeparti)	3
Centre Party (Senterpartiet)	8
Socialist Left Party (Sosialistisk Venstreparti)	2
Liberal Party (Venstre)	2
Total number of members:	37

Østre Toten kommunestyre 1995–1999
Party name (in Norwegian)	Number of representatives
Labour Party (Arbeiderpartiet)	20
Progress Party (Fremskrittspartiet)	4
Conservative Party (Høyre)	3
Christian Democratic Party (Kristelig Folkeparti)	3
Centre Party (Senterpartiet)	11
Socialist Left Party (Sosialistisk Venstreparti)	2
Liberal Party (Venstre)	2
Total number of members:	45

Østre Toten kommunestyre 1991–1995
Party name (in Norwegian)	Number of representatives
Labour Party (Arbeiderpartiet)	20
Progress Party (Fremskrittspartiet)	2
Conservative Party (Høyre)	4
Christian Democratic Party (Kristelig Folkeparti)	3
Centre Party (Senterpartiet)	11
Socialist Left Party (Sosialistisk Venstreparti)	4
Liberal Party (Venstre)	1
Total number of members:	45

Østre Toten kommunestyre 1987–1991
Party name (in Norwegian)	Number of representatives
Labour Party (Arbeiderpartiet)	23
Progress Party (Fremskrittspartiet)	4
Conservative Party (Høyre)	5
Christian Democratic Party (Kristelig Folkeparti)	3
Centre Party (Senterpartiet)	7
Socialist Left Party (Sosialistisk Venstreparti)	1
Liberal Party (Venstre)	1
Non-party list (Upolitisk liste)	1
Total number of members:	45

Østre Toten kommunestyre 1983–1987
Party name (in Norwegian)	Number of representatives
Labour Party (Arbeiderpartiet)	25
Progress Party (Fremskrittspartiet)	2
Conservative Party (Høyre)	6
Christian Democratic Party (Kristelig Folkeparti)	3
Centre Party (Senterpartiet)	6
Socialist Left Party (Sosialistisk Venstreparti)	1
Liberal Party (Venstre)	2
Total number of members:	45

Østre Toten kommunestyre 1979–1983
Party name (in Norwegian)	Number of representatives
Labour Party (Arbeiderpartiet)	23
Progress Party (Fremskrittspartiet)	1
Conservative Party (Høyre)	7
Christian Democratic Party (Kristelig Folkeparti)	4
Centre Party (Senterpartiet)	7
Socialist Left Party (Sosialistisk Venstreparti)	1
Liberal Party (Venstre)	2
Total number of members:	45

Østre Toten kommunestyre 1975–1979
Party name (in Norwegian)	Number of representatives
Labour Party (Arbeiderpartiet)	25
Conservative Party (Høyre)	3
Christian Democratic Party (Kristelig Folkeparti)	4
Centre Party (Senterpartiet)	10
Socialist Left Party (Sosialistisk Venstreparti)	2
Joint list of the Liberal Party (Venstre) and the Radical People's Party (Radikale Folkepartiet)	1
Total number of members:	45

Østre Toten kommunestyre 1971–1975
Party name (in Norwegian)	Number of representatives
Labour Party (Arbeiderpartiet)	26
Conservative Party (Høyre)	2
Christian Democratic Party (Kristelig Folkeparti)	3
Centre Party (Senterpartiet)	11
Joint List(s) of Non-Socialist Parties (Borgerlige Felleslister)	3
Total number of members:	45

Østre Toten kommunestyre 1967–1971
Party name (in Norwegian)	Number of representatives
Labour Party (Arbeiderpartiet)	25
Conservative Party (Høyre)	2
Christian Democratic Party (Kristelig Folkeparti)	2
Centre Party (Senterpartiet)	10
Socialist People's Party (Sosialistisk Folkeparti)	2
Liberal Party (Venstre)	4
Total number of members:	45

Østre Toten kommunestyre 1963–1967
Party name (in Norwegian)	Number of representatives
Labour Party (Arbeiderpartiet)	26
Conservative Party (Høyre)	2
Communist Party (Kommunistiske Parti)	1
Christian Democratic Party (Kristelig Folkeparti)	2
Centre Party (Senterpartiet)	11
Liberal Party (Venstre)	3
Total number of members:	45
Note: On 1 January 1964, Kolbu Municipality became part of Østre Toten Municipality.

Østre Toten herredsstyre 1959–1963
Party name (in Norwegian)	Number of representatives
Labour Party (Arbeiderpartiet)	17
Conservative Party (Høyre)	1
Communist Party (Kommunistiske Parti)	1
Christian Democratic Party (Kristelig Folkeparti)	2
Centre Party (Senterpartiet)	6
Liberal Party (Venstre)	1
Local List(s) (Lokale lister)	1
Total number of members:	29

Østre Toten herredsstyre 1955–1959
Party name (in Norwegian)	Number of representatives
Labour Party (Arbeiderpartiet)	18
Conservative Party (Høyre)	1
Communist Party (Kommunistiske Parti)	2
Christian Democratic Party (Kristelig Folkeparti)	2
Farmers' Party (Bondepartiet)	6
Liberal Party (Venstre)	2
Total number of members:	29

Østre Toten herredsstyre 1951–1955
Party name (in Norwegian)	Number of representatives
Labour Party (Arbeiderpartiet)	10
Communist Party (Kommunistiske Parti)	2
Christian Democratic Party (Kristelig Folkeparti)	1
Farmers' Party (Bondepartiet)	4
Liberal Party (Venstre)	2
Local List(s) (Lokale lister)	1
Total number of members:	20

Østre Toten herredsstyre 1947–1951
Party name (in Norwegian)	Number of representatives
Labour Party (Arbeiderpartiet)	8
Communist Party (Kommunistiske Parti)	5
Christian Democratic Party (Kristelig Folkeparti)	1
Farmers' Party (Bondepartiet)	4
Joint list of the Liberal Party (Venstre) and the Radical People's Party (Radikale Folkepartiet)	2
Total number of members:	20

Østre Toten herredsstyre 1945–1947
Party name (in Norwegian)	Number of representatives
Labour Party (Arbeiderpartiet)	10
Communist Party (Kommunistiske Parti)	3
Christian Democratic Party (Kristelig Folkeparti)	1
Farmers' Party (Bondepartiet)	4
Joint list of the Liberal Party (Venstre) and the Radical People's Party (Radikale Folkepartiet)	2
Total number of members:	20

Østre Toten herredsstyre 1937–1940*
Party name (in Norwegian)	Number of representatives
Labour Party (Arbeiderpartiet)	11
Radical People's Party (Radikale Folkepartiet)	3
Farmers' Party (Bondepartiet)	6
Total number of members:	20
Note: Due to the German occupation of Norway during World War II, no elections were held for new municipal councils until after the war ended in 1945.

=== Mayors ===
The mayor (Norwegian: ordfører) of Østre Toten Municipality is the political leader of the municipality and the chairperson of the municipal council. Here is a list of people who have held this position:

- 1838–1847: Peder Fauchald
- 1848–1849: Ole Larsen Hammerstad
- 1850–1856: Peder Fauchald
- 1856–1861: Ole Larsen Hammerstad
- 1862–1865: Jacob Brager
- 1866–1869: Hans Henrik Thaulow Borchgrevink
- 1870–1871: Ole Larsen Hammerstad
- 1872–1875: Carl Schjøll
- 1876–1877: Hans Laurits O. Hammerstad
- 1878–1893: Martin Adolf Andersen
- 1894–1897: Peder Madsen Wang
- 1898–1907: Adolf Rogneby
- 1908–1910: Peder Madsen Wang (LL)
- 1911–1913: Even Fodstad (LL)
- 1914–1922: Ole Weflen (AD)
- 1923–1925: Kristian Ørud (Bp)
- 1926–1928: Even Fodstad (Bp)
- 1929–1931: Ole Aass (Bp)
- 1932–1934: Ole Festad (Bp)
- 1935–1940: Einar Hermanrud (Ap)
- 1941–1943: Hans Rognerud (NS)
- 1943–1945: Nils Lundbæk (NS)
- 1945–1945: Per Gjestvang (NS)
- 1945–1967: Einar Hermanrud (Ap)
- 1968–1975: Fredrik Bredli (Ap)
- 1976–1983: Johan Nygaard (Ap)
- 1984–1991: Helge Røragen (Ap)
- 1992–1995: Hans Bjerregård (Ap)
- 1996–2003: Tor Finstad (Sp)
- 2004–2015: Hans Seierstad (Sp)
- 2015–2019: Guri Bråthen (Ap)
- 2019–present: Bror Helgestad (Sp)

== Climate ==
Østre Toten has a subarctic climate (Dfc). It is very close to a continental climate as September averages 9.7 °C (49.5 °F) and May averages 9 °C (48 °F). Summer is the wettest time of year and winters are cold and snowy.

Climate data for Østre Toten-Apelsvoll 1961-1990, extremes 1968-2015
Month	Jan	Feb	Mar	Apr	May	Jun	Jul	Aug	Sep	Oct	Nov	Dec	Year
Record high °C (°F)	10.4 (50.7)	11.7 (53.1)	19.0 (66.2)	21.6 (70.9)	27.6 (81.7)	32.5 (90.5)	31.6 (88.9)	31.6 (88.9)	26.0 (78.8)	20.5 (68.9)	15.9 (60.6)	10.4 (50.7)	32.5 (90.5)
Mean daily maximum °C (°F)	−4.9 (23.2)	−4.1 (24.6)	1.5 (34.7)	6.9 (44.4)	14.3 (57.7)	19.4 (66.9)	20.2 (68.4)	19.0 (66.2)	13.7 (56.7)	7.9 (46.2)	1.3 (34.3)	−2.5 (27.5)	7.7 (45.9)
Mean daily minimum °C (°F)	−11.1 (12.0)	−11.2 (11.8)	−6.3 (20.7)	−1.1 (30.0)	4.7 (40.5)	9.0 (48.2)	10.3 (50.5)	9.3 (48.7)	5.8 (42.4)	2.2 (36.0)	−3.6 (25.5)	−8.3 (17.1)	0.0 (32.0)
Record low °C (°F)	−33.9 (−29.0)	−31.0 (−23.8)	−27.0 (−16.6)	−15.4 (4.3)	−4.8 (23.4)	−1.0 (30.2)	2.1 (35.8)	0.0 (32.0)	−4.6 (23.7)	−13.7 (7.3)	−18.9 (−2.0)	−29.3 (−20.7)	−33.9 (−29.0)
Average precipitation mm (inches)	37 (1.5)	26 (1.0)	29 (1.1)	32 (1.3)	44 (1.7)	60 (2.4)	77 (3.0)	72 (2.8)	66 (2.6)	64 (2.5)	53 (2.1)	40 (1.6)	600 (23.6)
Average precipitation days	8.1	5.7	6.2	6.0	7.8	9.2	10.4	9.7	9.7	9.8	9.5	8.5	100.6
Source: Met Norway Eklima

== Economy ==
Østre Toten Municipality is one of the Innlandet county's most productive farming municipalities. Østre Toten is Norway's largest producers of potatoes and onions. This is reflected in the municipality's coat of arms, which displays a potato plant. The KiMs factory (which produces potato chips) is located at Skreia.

== Attractions ==
Among the town's most notable landmarks are the old Hoff Church and the rock carvings at Glemmestad near Kapp, now displayed in the Toten Museum.

== Notable people ==
=== Public Service ===
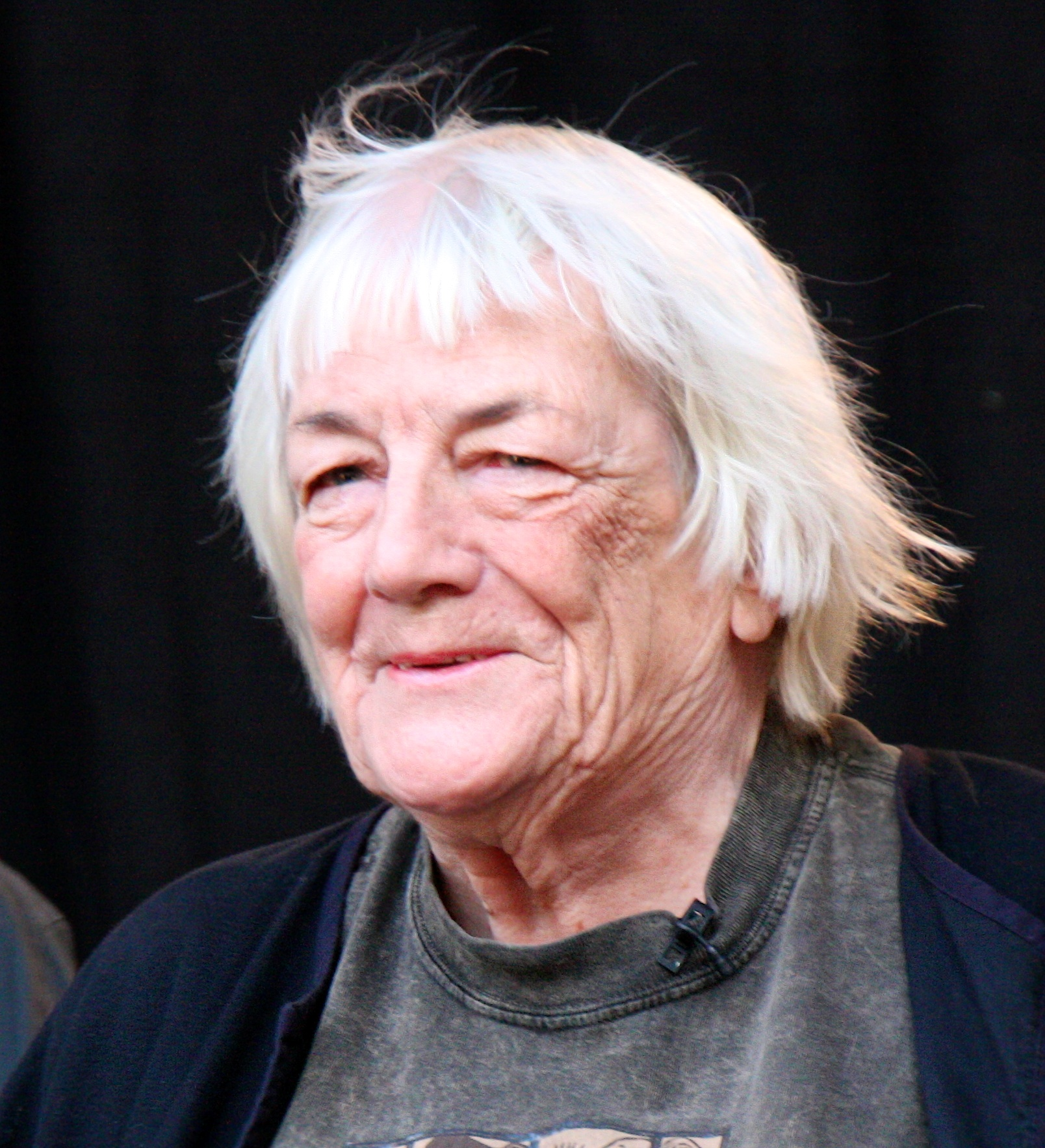
Margit Sandemo, 2010

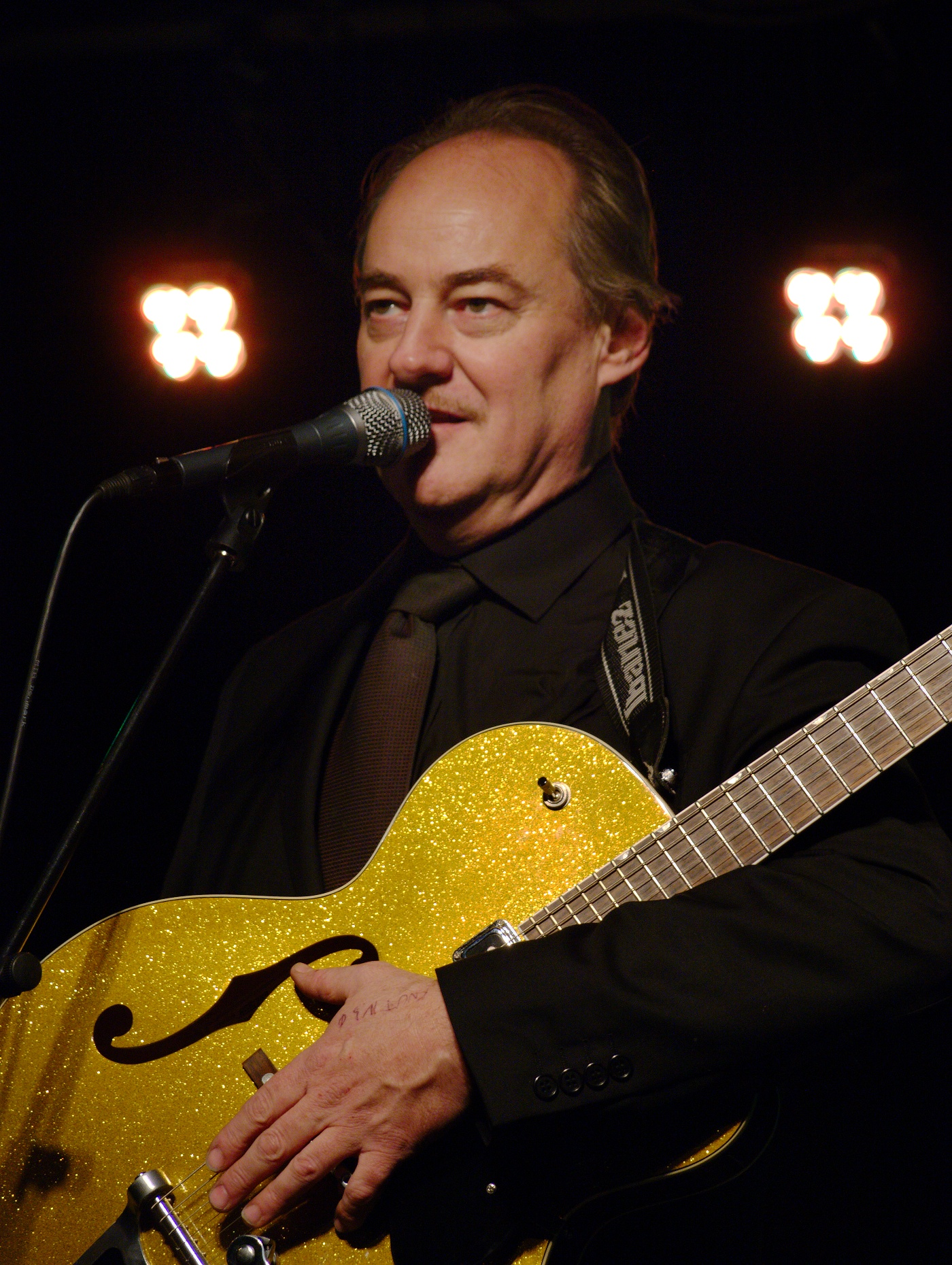
Eldar Vågan, 2010

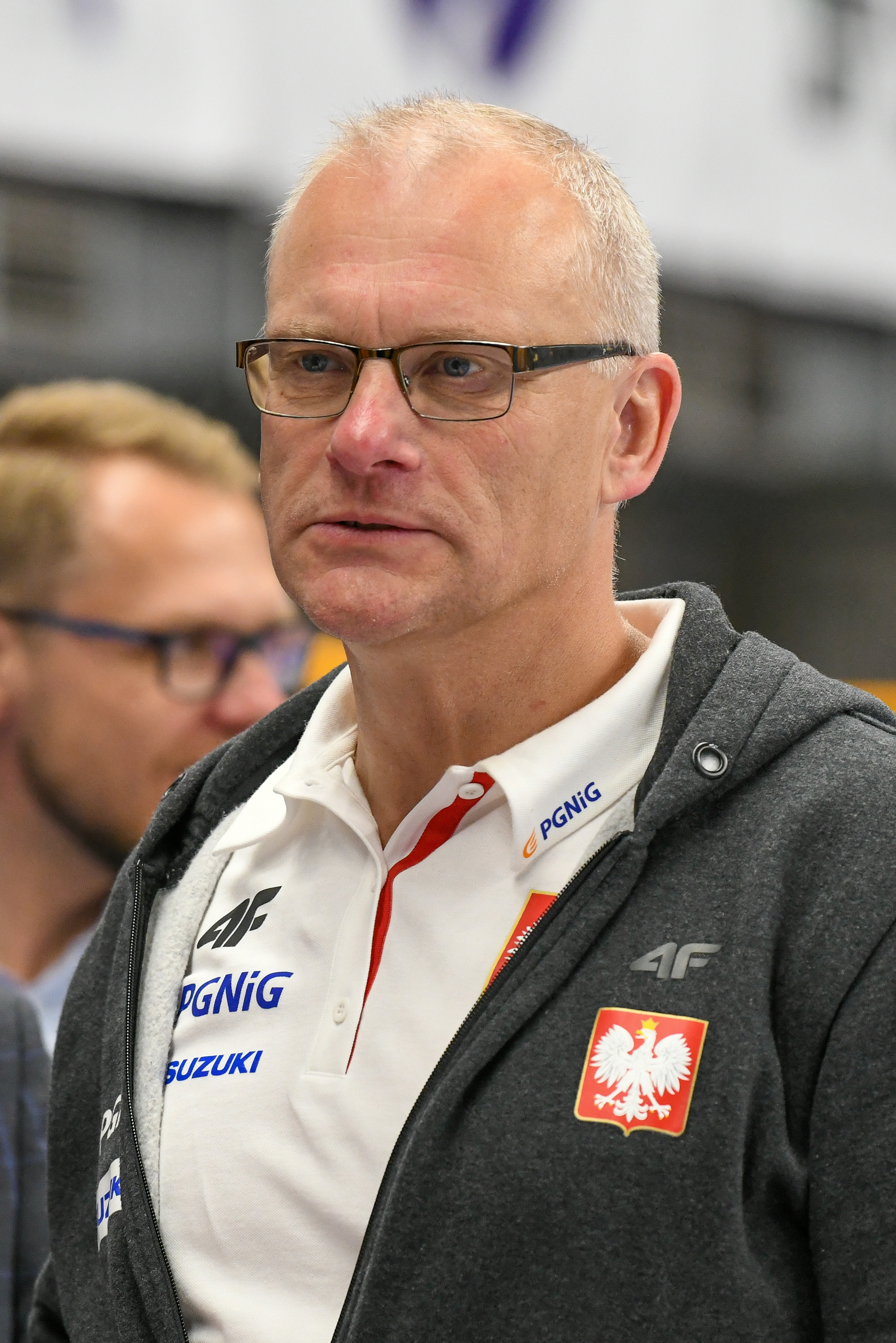
Arne Senstad, 2019

- Ole Hannibal Sommerfelt (1753 at Sukkestad – 1821), a jurist, civil servant, and topographer
- Lauritz Weidemann (1775 in Sukkestad – 1856), a Norwegian judge, civil servant, and politician
- Niels Fredriksen Dyhren (1778 in Østre Toten – 1866) & Peder Paulsen Balke (1779 in Østre Toten –1840), farmers, non-commissioner military officers and representatives at the Norwegian Constitutional Assembly
- Eduard Bøckmann (1849 in Østre Toten – 1927), a Norwegian-American ophthalmologist and physician
- E. W. Everson (1857 in Hveem - 1931), a pioneer homesteader in Dakota Territory
- Kristian Ørud (1878 at Skjefstad – 1946), a farmer and Mayor of Østre Toten in the 1920s
- twins Adolf Bredo Stabell (1908 in Kolbu – 1996), a Norwegian diplomat & Peter Platou Stabell (1908 in Kolbu – 1992), a Norwegian barrister.
- Atle Ørbeck Sørheim (born 1933 in Østre Toten), a veterinarian and civil servant

=== The Arts ===
- Peder Balke (1804–1887), a painter of romantic and dramatic landscapes, lived in Toten
- Marie Wexelsen (1832 in Østre Toten – 1911), an educator, poet, children's writer, and novelist
- Leif Solberg (1914 in Lena – 2016), a classical composer and organist
- Margit Sandemo (1924 in Lena – 2018), a Norwegian-Swedish historical fantasy author
- Svein Erik Brodal (born 1939 in Østre Toten), an actor, theatre director, novelist and politician
- Einar Steen-Nøkleberg (1944 in Østre Toten), a classical pianist and musical pedagogue
- Inger Lise Rypdal (born 1949 in Lena), a singer and actress
- Maj Britt Andersen (born 1956 in Østre Toten), a singer
- Eldar Vågan (born 1960 in Kapp), a songwriter and guitarist in Vazelina Bilopphøggers
- Knut Anders Sørum (born 1976 in Østre Toten), a singer at the Eurovision Song Contest 2004

=== Sport ===
- Alv Gjestvang (1937 in Østre Toten − 2016), a speed skater, bronze and silver medallist at the 1956 & 1964 Winter Olympics
- Arne Senstad (born 1969 in Kapp), a professional handball coach
- Ruben Gabrielsen (born 1992 in Lena), a professional footballer with over 200 club caps

== Sister cities ==
Østre Toten has sister city agreements with the following places:

- – Jammerbugt, Region Nordjylland, Denmark
- – Kesälahti, Itä-Suomi, Finland
- – Rättvik, Dalarna County, Sweden
