= Kapp, Norway =

Village in Østre Toten Municipality, Norway

Kapp
- Village
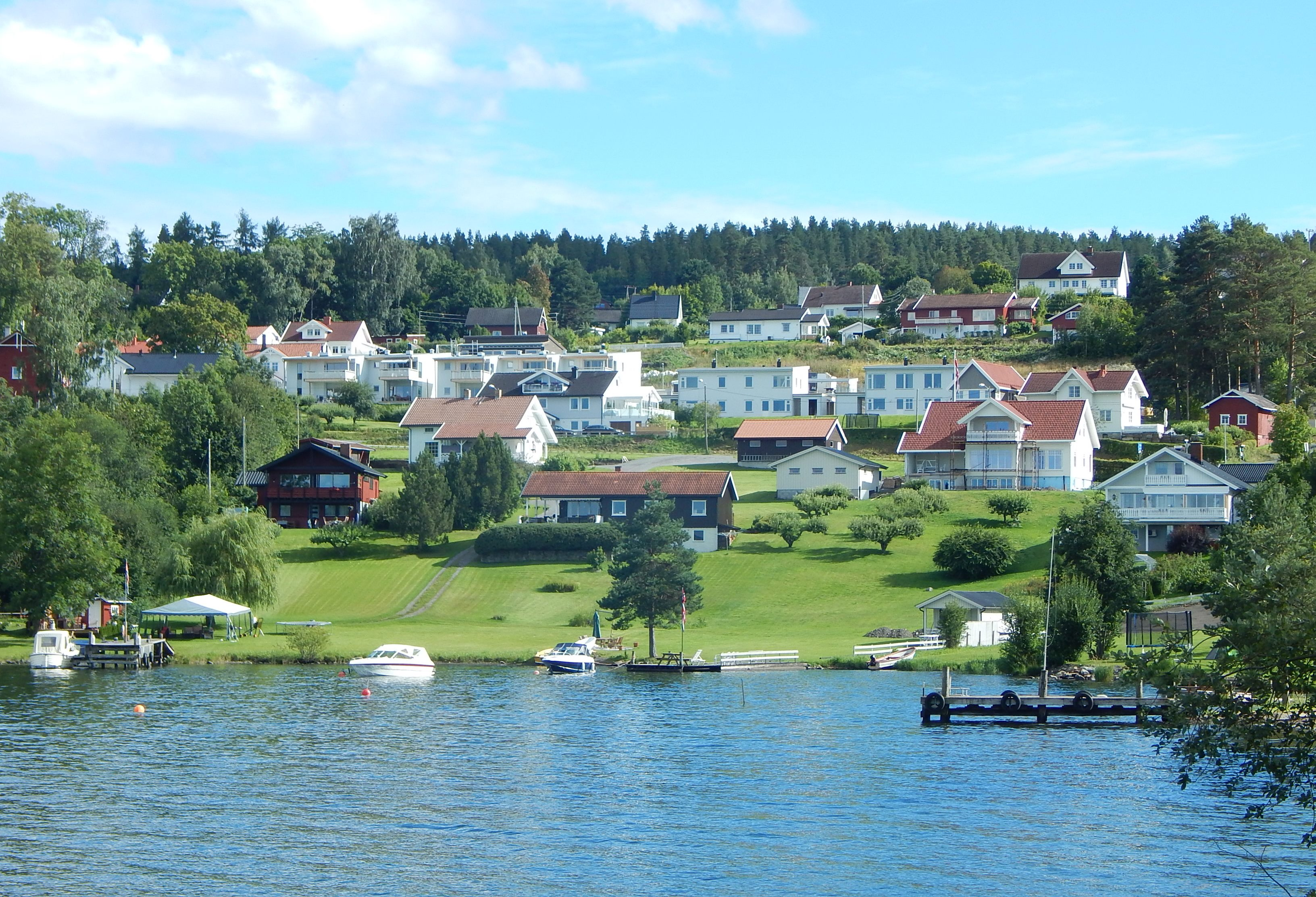
- View of the village
- Interactive map of Kapp
- Location within Innlandet Location within Norway
- Coordinates: 60.71428°N 10.85768°E
- Country: Norway
- Region: Eastern Norway
- County: Innlandet
- District: Toten
- Municipality: Østre Toten Municipality

Area
  - Total: 1.88 km^{2} (0.73 sq mi)
- Elevation: 149 m (489 ft)

Population (2024)
  - Total: 2,172
  - Density: 1,155/km^{2} (2,990/sq mi)
- Time zone: UTC+01:00 (CET)
  - Summer (DST): UTC+02:00 (CEST)
- Post Code: 2849 Kapp

Kapp is a village in Østre Toten Municipality in Innlandet county, Norway. The village is located along the shore of the large lake Mjøsa, about 15 kilometres (9.3 mi) across the lake from the town of Hamar. The town of Gjøvik lies about 12 kilometres (7.5 mi) to the northwest of Kapp. Kapp has summer ferry connections to Gjøvik, Tingnes, and Hamar.

The 1.88-square-kilometre (460-acre) village has a population (2024) of 2,172 and a population density of 1,155 inhabitants per square kilometre (2,990/sq mi). This makes it the largest urban settlement in the whole municipality.

Kapp has varied small industries, including aluminum production for boats and equipment for the oil industry at Kapp Aluminium. The old Kapp milk factory buildings have been turned into a museum. Just south of the village is the Peder Balke Center which hosts art exhibitions and other events.

== Name ==
The area was historically called Smørvika, but the area was named Kapp when the milk factories were built on the site towards the end of the 19th century. Kapp is probably used here for "headland" or "promontory".
