= Andrew Barton (privateer) =

Scottish sailor

Sir Andrew Barton
- Born: c. 1466; Leith, Scotland
- Died: 2 August 1511; At sea, off Kent, England
- Occupations: Sailor, privateer
- Known for: Raids against Portuguese ships; subject of traditional folk songs

Sir Andrew Barton (c. 1466 – 2 August 1511) was a Scottish sailor from Leith. He gained notoriety as a privateer, making raids against Portuguese ships. He was killed in battle and subsequently memorialised in English and Scottish folk songs.

== Career ==
Some of Andrew Barton's trading voyages to Flanders ports in the 1490s are recorded in the Ledger of Andrew Halyburton. He was the oldest of three brothers; a younger brother, Robert Barton of Over Barnton, became Lord High Treasurer of Scotland.

Andrew became notorious in England and Portugal as a pirate, though his possession of a letter of marque from the Scottish crown granted him the somewhat more respectable status of a privateer. The letter of marque against Portuguese shipping was originally granted to his father, John Barton, by James III of Scotland before 1485. John's ships had been attacked by Portuguese vessels when he was trading at Sluis in Flanders.

James IV revived the letters in July 1507. When Barton, sailing in the Lion, tried to take reprisals against Portuguese ships in 1508, he was detained by Dutch authorities at Veere. James IV had to write to Maximilian, the Holy Roman Emperor, and others to get him released in 1509. Andrew then took a Portuguese ship which carried an English cargo, leading to more difficulties, and James IV had to suspend the letter of marque for a year. Andrew captured a ship of Antwerp in 1509, the Fasterinsevin (Scots for Shrove Tuesday; the name in Dutch would have been Vastenavond), which did not come within his letter of marque. James IV ordered him to recompense Captain Peter Lempson and his officers for her cargo of woad and canvas.

The Bartons were in demand to support John, King of Denmark, who allowed them to harass the shipping of Lübeck. In return for this service, John of Denmark sent James IV timber for the masts of his ships from Flensburg. Sir Andrew joined John's service briefly in the spring of 1511, but sailed away without permission, also taking a ship that James IV had given to John.

== Last battle ==
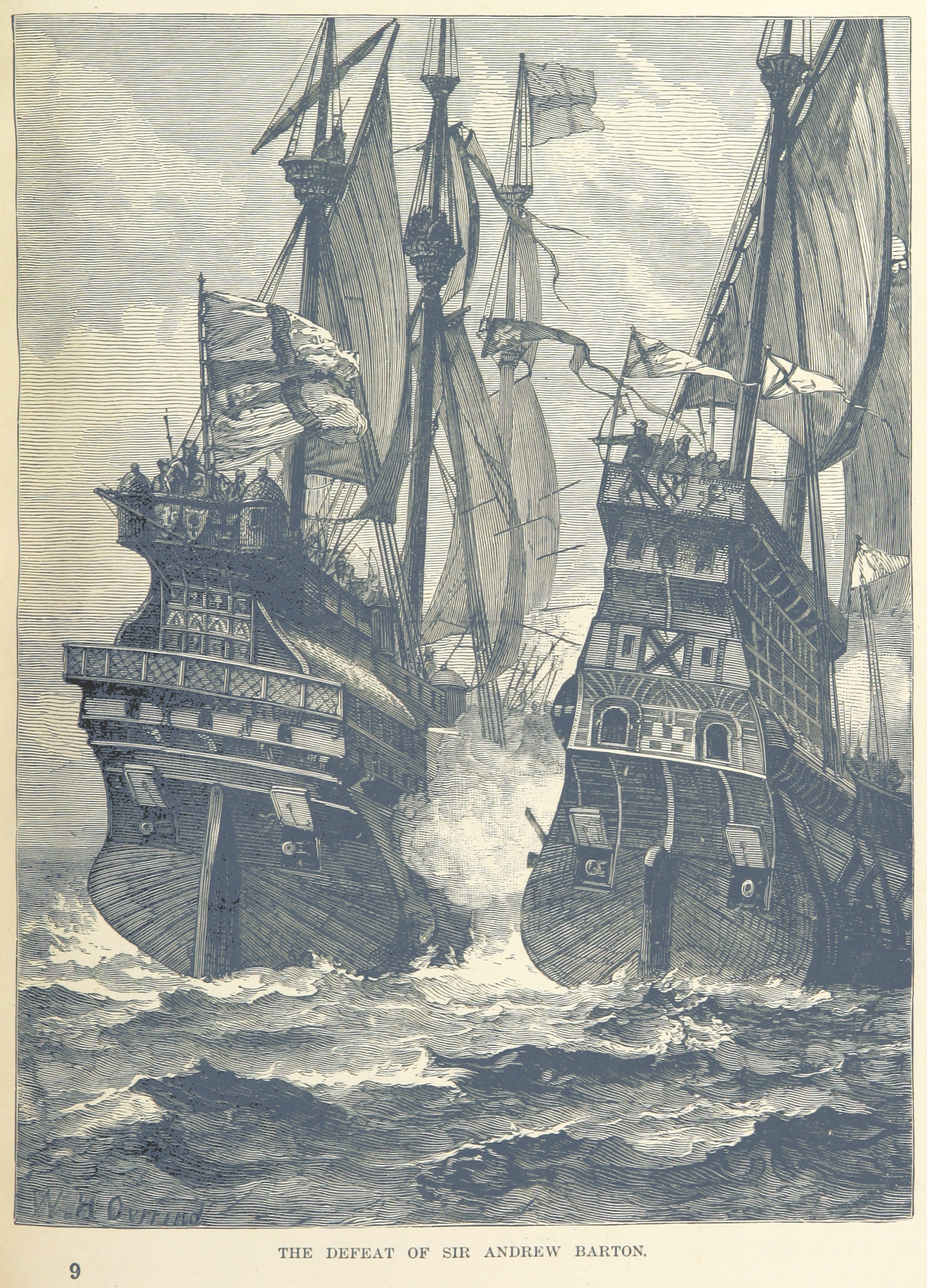
An 1887 illustration of Barton's last battle

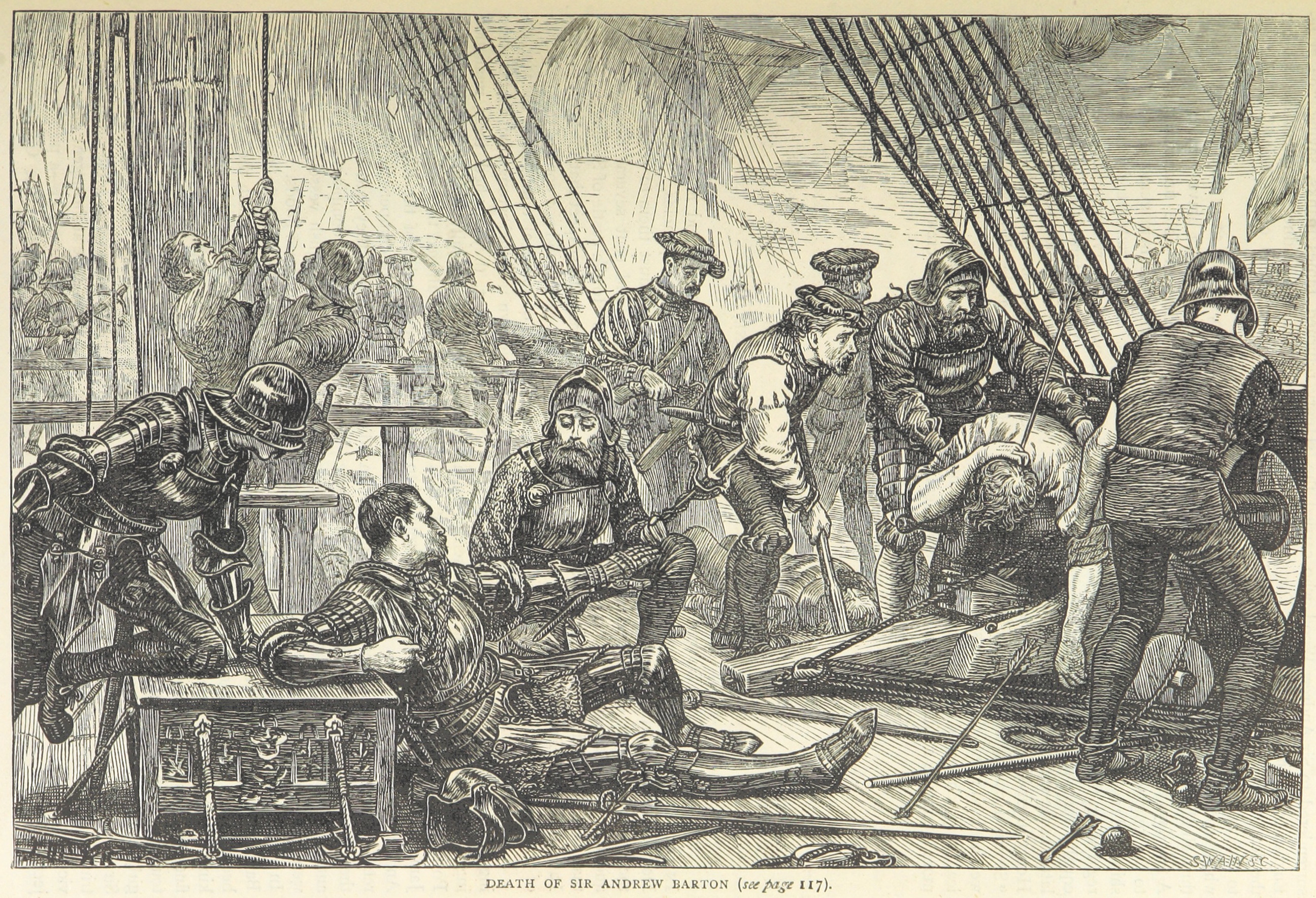
The death of Andrew Barton, illustrated in James Grant's British Battles on Land and Sea, 1873

Later in 1511, Sir Andrew was cruising the English coast looking for Portuguese prizes when he and his ships the Lion and Jenny Pirwyn were captured after a fierce battle with Sir Edward Howard and his brother Thomas Howard, 3rd Duke of Norfolk, off Kent at the Downs. According to the story told in ballads, Andrew was shot and killed by an English archer during the battle and subsequently beheaded, his head being taken to Henry VIII as evidence of his death.

The incident was recalled two years later in the exchange of rhetoric at the battle of Flodden. The story of the sea-battle was told by Raphael Holinshed and in other 16th-century English chronicles. In Holinshed's story the Howards at first pretended only to approach and salute Andrew Barton, but then engaged in battle, Barton's ship was the Unicorn and he died from his wounds. The Scottish survivors were taken to London and kept prisoner in the Bishop of York's lodging, York Place at Whitehall. Edward Hall wrote that Sir Andrew encouraged his men during the fight with his whistle. Hall mentions that the two ships were brought to Blackwall on 2 August 1511, and the prisoners were freed after an interview with the Bishop of Winchester, after acknowledging their piracy.

The Scottish bishop John Lesley gave a similar account of the battle in his chronicle. George Buchanan's account gives the detail that Andrew Barton continued fighting after his leg was broken by a gunshot, and encouraged his sailors by beating a drum before he died from his wounds. Buchanan emphasises that the Howards sailed on the instruction of Henry VIII following a representation by a Portuguese ambassador. Hall wrote that Henry VIII was at Leicester when he ordered the Howards to chase the Scottish ships.

== In popular culture ==
Barton is the subject of a traditional folk song entitled "Sir Andrew Barton" (Child ballad #167). In some versions, Sir Andrew says:

"I am hurt, but I am not slaine;
I'le lay mee downe and bleed a-while,
And then I'le rise and fight againe."

The later ballad "Henry Martin" (Child ballad #250) also concerns Sir Andrew, though the plot was simplified and the protagonist's name corrupted in its descent from the earlier song.

Rudyard Kipling wrote a short story connected with Barton in his Puck of Pook's Hill series.

== Notable descendants ==
The Stedman family of which there have been a number of notable members, such as Charles Stedman (1753–1812) and John Gabriel Stedman (1744–1797) have a tradition that Andrew Barton left an only son, Charles, who married Susan Stedman of Leith and took his wife's name. Another notable member was John Andrew Stedman (1778–1833) who was general in the Dutch army during the Napoleonic Wars (his father was a naturalised Dutchman who had been in the Scots Brigade in the service of the States-General of the Netherlands). His son Charles John William Stedman became a Prussian subject, settling at Besselich Abbey, near Coblentz. He was a member of the national assemblies of Frankfurt am Main and Erfurt, and received the title of freiherr (baron). He had a large family, of which nearly all the sons entered the Queen Augusta Regiment of Guards; they reverted to the original family name of Barton.
