= John Andrew Stedman =

John Andrew Stedman (1778–1833) was general in the Dutch army during the Napoleonic Wars.

== Biography ==
Stedman was born at Zutphen in 1778, the son of William George Stedman (a naturalised Dutchman of Scottish descent), and a Dutch mother of noble blood. (Note: Both his father and grandfather, who belonged to the same family as Charles Stedman and John Gabriel Stedman, were officers in the Scots Brigade in the service of the States-General of the Dutch Republic—a corps whose history extends from 1570 to 1783. Both of them married Dutch wives of noble blood. In 1783, when the Scots brigade was formed into Dutch regiments, and most of the officers resigned their commissions, Captain William George Stedman elected to be naturalised in the country of his adoption.)

Stedman received a commission in the Dutch army when only a child. At the early age of sixteen he first saw service with the allied forces, under Frederick, Duke of York and the Prince of Orange (afterwards King William I of the Netherlands) which were employed in 1794 on the northern frontier of France.

Stedman's next service was in 1799, when the Batavian Republic was in alliance with France, and the Duke of York commanded the opposing army at Bergen. At a later date he again served against the British at Walcheren. Meanwhile, he had held important staff appointments, and, on the incorporation of the Netherlands with France, he became general of brigade in the French army. In this capacity he served for two years in Italy, and was in 1813 present at the battles of Bautzen and Dresden.

In 1814 he attached himself to the Prince of Orange (afterwards King William II of the Netherlands), and commanded the Dutch troops in the reserve during the Battle of Waterloo, with the rank of lieutenant-general. He died at Nijmegen in 1833.

== Family ==
Stedman married Nicola Gertrude van de Poll, granddaughter of the last reigning burgomaster of Amsterdam. Their only son, Charles John William Stedman, became a Prussian subject, settling at Besselich Abbey, near Coblentz. He was a member of the national assemblies of Frankfurt am Main and Erfurt, and received the title of freiherr (baron). He had a large family, of which nearly all the sons entered the Queen Augusta Regiment of Guards; they reverted to the original family name of Barton.

== Resources ==
- John Stedman (1857), Memoir of the Family of Barton
