= Claude Jerome Lapp =

American physicist, physics educator, science administrator, and archer

- Born: 1892
- Died: July 29, 1973 (aged 81); Alexandria, Virginia, U.S.
- Citizenship: United States
- Education: Albion College; University of Illinois
- Known for: Physics education research; National Research Council fellowship work; early compound-bow design
- Scientific career
- Fields: Physics, physics education, scientific personnel administration
- Workplaces: State University of Iowa / University of Iowa; National Academy of Sciences; National Research Council
- Thesis: The effect of short electromagnetic waves on a beam of cathode rays (1922)

Claude Jerome Lapp (1892 – July 29, 1973) was an American physicist, physics educator, science administrator, and archer. He taught physics at the State University of Iowa, now the University of Iowa, and later worked for the National Academy of Sciences and National Research Council in scientific-personnel and fellowship administration. His published work addressed college physics instruction, physics examinations, instructional films, and scientific-personnel selection. Later bow-mechanics literature credits him with building an early compound bow in 1938. Lapp died in Alexandria, Virginia on July 29, 1973, aged 81.

== Early life and education ==
Lapp graduated from Albion College in 1917, received an M.A. from the University of Illinois in 1920, and earned a Ph.D. in physics in 1922. University of Illinois records identify his doctoral field as physics and give the thesis title as The effect of short electromagnetic waves on a beam of cathode rays. A University of Illinois commencement record likewise lists Claude Jerome Lapp, A.B. Albion College, 1917, A.M. 1920, with the same thesis title.

== University of Iowa career ==
Lapp was a member of the physics faculty at the State University of Iowa, the historical name of the University of Iowa. In an autobiographical article, James A. Van Allen recalled that when he attended the University of Iowa in 1935, the Department of Physics faculty numbered five: George W. Stewart, John A. Eldridge, Edward P. T. Tyndall, Claude J. Lapp, and Alexander Ellett.

Lapp's early research included instrumentation and electron-beam work. In 1923, he published "A Simple Device for Recording Sound Waves" in the Journal of the Optical Society of America and two papers in the Proceedings of the Iowa Academy of Science: "A Simple High Frequency Alternator" and "The Trace Left by a Helical Beam of Electrons on a Plane Perpendicular to Its Axis".

== Physics education and professional activity ==
Lapp became active in physics-education research during the 1930s and early 1940s. His work addressed testing, problem solving, engineering physics, instructional films, and the measurement of student and teacher performance. In 1933, he reported on the first cooperative college physics examination sponsored by the American Association of Physics Teachers, involving students in fifteen cooperating colleges. He later chaired AAPT test-related work; the American Journal of Physics cumulative index lists him as chairman of the Committee on Tests for "Measuring the Results of Instruction in College Physics" and as chairman of a committee representing the association before the American Council on Education.

Lapp was also involved in the early institutional development of AAPT publications and teaching resources. The association's list of past advisory-board members for the American Journal of Physics includes C. J. Lapp of the University of Iowa for 1933–1935. AAPT's history of its early activities says that Lapp suggested the idea that led to the association's project for an encyclopedia of lecture demonstrations, later published as Demonstration Experiments in Physics.

Lapp's physics-education publications included work on bright students, the teaching of the vernier, electrical potential, and physics-teacher rating. In the American Journal of Physics, he published articles including "The Effectiveness of a Sound Motion Picture in College Physics" in 1939, "Teaching Engineering Physics" in 1940, and "The Teaching Effectiveness of the Sound Motion Picture 'The Electron'" in 1941. With Marsh W. White, he published "Physics Teacher Rating in the Summer Engineering Defense Training Program" in 1942.

== Kappa Eta Kappa ==
Lapp was associated with the founding period of Kappa Eta Kappa, a professional electrical engineering fraternity founded at the University of Iowa in 1923. A contemporary notice in The Transit, the University of Iowa engineering publication, stated that Kappa Eta Kappa made its appearance on February 10, 1923, and listed Claude J. Lapp, associate professor of physics, among the charter members.

In 1928, the Georgia Tech student newspaper The Technique reported that the petition of the Hi-Tension Club to become a chapter of Kappa Eta Kappa had been approved, and identified "Dr. C. J. Lapp, the national president and Professor of Physics at the University of Iowa" as one of the installing officers.

== National Academy of Sciences and National Research Council ==
In 1947, Lapp joined the National Academy of Sciences. The American Heritage Center finding aid for his papers describes him as serving for nearly twenty years as a National Academy of Sciences official, beginning as assistant director of the Office of Scientific Personnel and later becoming director of special projects before retiring in 1966.

Lapp's later work was connected with scientific personnel, fellowships, and graduate education. A 1966 National Academy of Sciences–National Research Council report on fellowship selection described the Office of Scientific Personnel as concerned with the production and utilization of scientific manpower and stated that Lindsey R. Harmon worked closely with Dr. Claude J. Lapp, who directed the Fellowship Office during that period.

Lapp was part of the administrative network through which NRC fellowship applications and postdoctoral appointments were handled. The Linus Pauling papers at Oregon State University record a 1953 letter from C. J. Lapp of the National Research Council asking Pauling to evaluate a fellowship applicant. A National Institute of Standards and Technology history notes that correspondence from Wallace R. Brode to Claude J. Lapp of the NRC formalized a postdoctoral program involving the National Bureau of Standards and the National Research Council.

== Archery and compound-bow design ==
Lapp was active in archery; the American Heritage Center's description of his papers lists archery records and awards among the collection contents. Later bow-mechanics literature credits Lapp with an early compound bow design. In his study of bow mechanics, B. W. Kooi stated that in North America, the first compound bow was reportedly built in 1938 by a physicist named Claude Lapp, using pulleys with eccentric bearings at the ends of stiff elastic limbs. In a 1980 paper, Kooi and J. A. Sparenberg described the compound bow as having been invented about fifty years earlier by "a physicist named Claude Lapp" and described the use of pulleys with eccentric bearings at the ends of elastic limbs. A 2017 article in Meccanica similarly stated that the compound bow was invented by Claude Lapp in 1938, citing a 1977 Machine Design article by R. B. Aronson.

== Papers ==
The Claude Jerome Lapp papers are held by the American Heritage Center at the University of Wyoming. The collection, numbered 05624, covers 1901–1978 and consists of 10.80 cubic feet in 24 boxes. The finding aid describes the collection as containing material from Lapp's career as a physics professor and federal official, including correspondence, printed material, reports, speeches and lectures, photographs and slides, and autobiographical material.

== Selected publications ==
=== Physics and physics education ===
- Lapp, C. J. (1923). "A Simple Device for Recording Sound Waves". Journal of the Optical Society of America. 7 (8): 661–664.
- Lapp, C. J. (1923). "The Trace Left by a Helical Beam of Electrons on a Plane Perpendicular to Its Axis". Proceedings of the Iowa Academy of Science. 30 (1): 72–74.
- Lapp, C. J. (1925). "A Study of an Objective Achievement Examination in Physics". Proceedings of the Iowa Academy of Science. 32 (1).
- Lapp, C. J. (1933). "Informal Reports of Standing Committees of the American Association of Physics Teachers: The Committee on Tests and Measurements". American Journal of Physics. 1 (2): 55. doi:10.1119/1.1992828.
- Lapp, C. J. (1937). "A Repetition of the Experiment on Teaching the Vernier". Proceedings of the Iowa Academy of Science. 44 (1): 154.
- Lapp, C. J. (1939). "The Effectiveness of a Sound Motion Picture in College Physics". American Journal of Physics. 7 (4): 224–230. doi:10.1119/1.1991545.
- Lapp, C. J. (1940). "Teaching Engineering Physics". American Journal of Physics. 8 (6): 346–354. doi:10.1119/1.1991605.
- Lapp, C. J. (1942). "The Rating of Physics Teachers in the Pennsylvania Summer Engineering Defense Training Program". Proceedings of the Iowa Academy of Science. 49 (1): 381.
- Lapp, C. J.; White, Marsh W. (1942). "Physics Teacher Rating in the Summer Engineering Defense Training Program". American Journal of Physics. 10 (3): 154–157. doi:10.1119/1.1990351.

=== Books and tests ===
- Lapp, C. J.; Knight, F. B.; Rietz, H. L. (1942). Mathematics for the Emergency. Scott, Foresman & Co.
- Lapp, C. J.; Knight, F. B.; Rietz, H. L. (1942). Review of Mathematics for College Students. Scott, Foresman & Co.
- Moore, Bruce V.; Lapp, C. J.; Griffin, Charles H. (1943). Engineering and Physical Science Aptitude Test. The Psychological Corporation.
- Moore, Bruce Victor; Lapp, C. J.; Griffin, Charles H. (1951). Engineering and Physical Science Aptitude Test (EPSAT) (Revised ed.). The Psychological Corporation.
