= KHK =

KHK may refer to:

- Kappa Eta Kappa, an American professional fraternity
- Ketohexokinase, a fructose phosphorylase
- Katholieke Hogeschool Kempen, a former Belgian college
- Kanun Hükmünde Kararname, a form of decree-law in Turkey
- Kyowa Hakko Kirin, a former name for the pharmaceutical company Kyowa Kirin
