= Rosseland (crater) =

Crater on the Moon

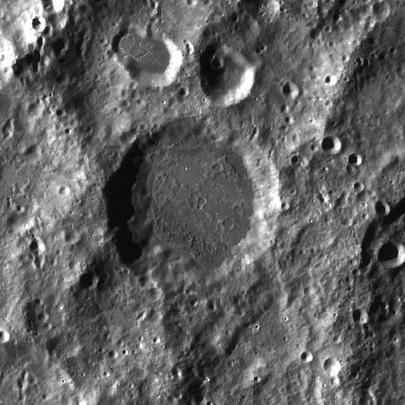
- LRO WAC image
- Coordinates: 41.0°S 131.0°E
- Diameter: 75 km
- Depth: unknown
- Colongitude: 230° at sunrise
- Eponym: Svein Rosseland

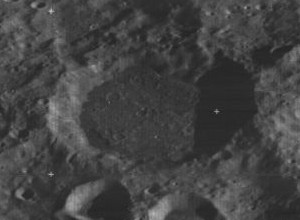
Oblique view from Lunar Orbiter 3, facing south

Rosseland is a lunar impact crater on the far side of the Moon. It lies less than one crater diameter to the northeast of Carver, and about the same distance to the west of the larger Roche. To the northwest lies the smaller Coblentz.

This formation overlies the southern rim of the larger satellite crater Rosseland V. The rim of Rosseland is worn and uneven. The interior floor is relatively level and has some patches of lower-albedo material along the edges of the inner wall.

== See also ==
- 1646 Rosseland, minor planet
