= Kappa Eta Kappa =

American professional fraternity

- ΚΗΚ
- Coat of Arms
- Founded: February 10, 1923; 103 years ago University of Iowa
- Type: Professional
- Affiliation: PFA
- Former affiliation: PIC
- Status: Active
- Emphasis: Electrical and computer engineering
- Scope: National
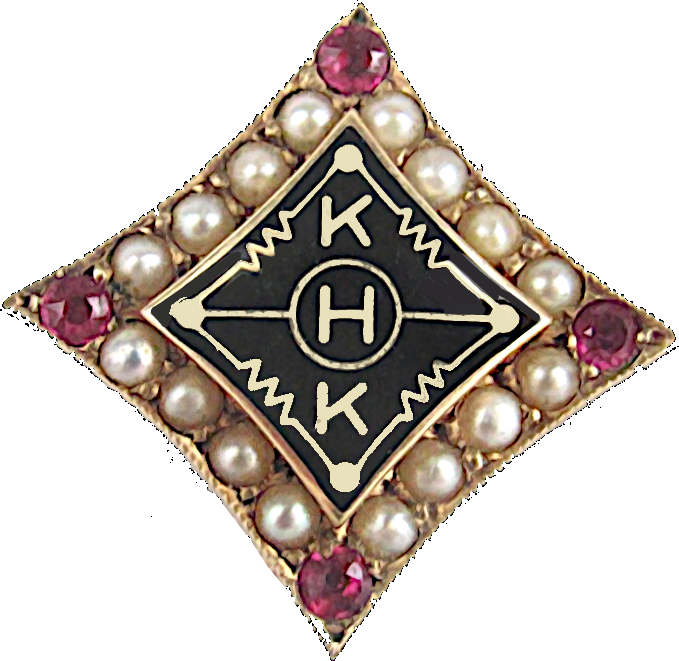
- Member badge
- Colors: Purple and Gold
- Symbol: Lightning bolt
- Publication: The Electron
- Chapters: 3 active, 6 inactive
- Members: ≈ 6,000 lifetime
- Headquarters: 114 North Orchard Street; Madison, Wisconsin 53715; United States
- Website: khk.org

Kappa Eta Kappa (ΚΗΚ) is an American co-educational professional fraternity for students of electrical engineering, computer engineering, and allied technical fields. Founded in 1923 at the University of Iowa in Iowa City, Iowa, it is a member of the Professional Fraternity Association (PFA). As of 2026, Kappa Eta Kappa comprises three active collegiate chapters, three alumni associations, and an estimated lifetime membership of six thousand.

== History ==
=== Founding and early expansion (1923–1941) ===
Kappa Eta Kappa was founded on February 10, 1923, at the State University of Iowa (now the University of Iowa) in Iowa City, Iowa, as a professional fraternity for electrical engineering students. Contemporary newspaper reports described the fraternity as a professional organization for electrical engineers, with organizational work beginning in fall 1922 and formal organization completed on February 10, 1923. It was initially established for male students majoring in electrical engineering.

There were 25 charter members. Clinton H. Smoke of Iowa City, a senior in applied science, was elected the first president. Other charter members included Will D. Crozier, William Nelson, Richard Schump, Leslie T. Tilton, Claude J. Lapp of the physics department, and James R. Eyre. Lapp had graduated from Albion College in 1917, received a master's degree from the University of Illinois in 1920, and earned a Ph.D. in physics two years later. The charter members selected three honorary members from the electrical engineering faculty: Arthur H. Ford, head of the electrical engineering department, and professors Glenn K. Pierce and W. E. Schwob.

After the founding of the Alpha chapter, other chapters were quickly added. Beta was established in May 1923 at the University of Minnesota, followed by Gamma at the University of Kansas, Delta at the University of Wisconsin–Madison, and Epsilon at the Massachusetts Institute of Technology in 1924. At Wisconsin, the Technical Club, a local organization of electrical engineers, was installed as a chapter of Kappa Eta Kappa on February 9, 1924, following a ceremony conducted by national secretary L. Warren of Minnesota and delegates from the Iowa and Minnesota chapters. The Gamma chapter was installed at the University of Kansas in February 1924 and was described by a contemporary report as the first departmental engineering fraternity installed there.

The Alpha chapter purchased the Tony Smit home at 302 South Linn Street in Iowa City in October 1923, with George C. Johnson of Manning, Iowa, serving as chapter president. The chapter incorporated in May 1924, filing articles with the county recorder; the reported officers were George C. Johnson as president, Harlan W. Bowen as vice president and treasurer, and Orville H. Pullen as secretary. The incorporation report stated that the chapter had no capital stock and that the members sought unity as a fraternal body rather than incorporation for the purpose of building a house. By 1929, contemporary records listed the Alpha chapter at 728 Bowery in Iowa City.

In 1926, Beta chapter purchased a chapter house at Fulton and Walnut streets SE in Minneapolis, Minnesota. A later report identified the house as 631 Walnut Street SE, stated that it was purchased for $14,500, and described it as containing eleven large rooms and a sleeping porch; the same report listed the chapter's then-current quarters at 1807 Fourth Street SE.

In 1928, the fraternity was a founding member of the Professional Interfraternity Conference (PIC); however, it dropped its membership before PIC merged with the Professional Panhellenic Association to form the Professional Fraternity Association (PFA) in 1977. Kappa Eta Kappa was later again listed as a member of the PFA.

=== Wartime contraction and revival (1941–1979) ===
World War II mobilization reduced Kappa Eta Kappa's enrollments so sharply that by 1944, only two chapters remained active. Its national conventions resumed in 1947, and its slow revival culminated in the establishment of Theta at the Milwaukee School of Engineering in 1957.

=== Co-education and renewed growth (1980–present) ===
In 1981, Kappa Eta Kappa voted to admit women. Iota at St. Cloud State University was installed in 1990 and remains active.

Kappa Eta Kappa celebrated its centenary with coordinated Founders' Day programs. Beta hosted a three-day technical symposium and gala in April 2023. Delta followed with a Centennial Banquet on October 12, 2024.

== Mission ==
Kappa Eta Kappa's mission statement is:

Believing that the attainment of education as well as technical training is the aim of all true engineers, we band ourselves together to foster and promote fraternal relations among Electrical Engineering students; to strive at all times for the maintenance of a complete and lasting understanding and fellowship between faculty and students; to unceasingly cherish and develop character and ideals of service as the necessary attributes of the profession.

== Symbols ==
Kappa Eta Kappa's coat of arms is a quarterly shield in purple and gold and bears the instruments of the electrical profession. The fraternity's colors are purple and gold. Its symbol is the lightning bolt. Its badge is a binding post. Its publication is The Electron.

== Membership ==
Membership in Kappa Eta Kappa is limited to students in electrical engineering, computer engineering, computer science, or related disciplines. Potential members cannot belong to other professional fraternities. Faculty members who teach electrical engineering and graduates who are active in the profession are eligible for honorary membership.

== Activities and scholarships ==
Kappa Eta Kappa chapters conduct academic, professional, social, and outreach programming for engineering and technical students. The national fraternity describes its members as participating in events, study sessions, and an engineering-focused community. The Delta chapter at the University of Wisconsin–Madison describes chapter activities including studying together, professional talks, industry networking, and social events.

Delta chapter has also participated in STEM outreach. In 2024, the chapter took part in the University of Wisconsin–Madison Engineering EXPO, where members presented an interactive Kappa Eta Kappa-themed version of Flappy Bird coded in Python for middle- and high-school students.

Alumni of the Beta chapter established the Kappa Eta Kappa Scholarship Fund at the University of Minnesota in 1985. The scholarship supports active Beta members and is awarded based on chapter activities, extracurricular activities, good citizenship, and academic achievement. The Beta Alumni Association later organized the Kappa Eta Kappa Beta Chapter Scholarship Foundation to manage scholarship funds for active Beta members. The foundation is listed by ProPublica Nonprofit Explorer as a tax-exempt 501(c)(3) nonprofit with a tax-exemption ruling date of May 2021.

== National Executive Council conventions ==
- 97th annual convention – February 24, 2024 – hosted by Beta chapter (University of Minnesota, Minneapolis, Minnesota).
- 98th annual convention – February 22, 2025 – hosted by Delta chapter (Madison, Wisconsin).
- 99th annual convention – February 28, 2026 – hosted by Iota chapter (St. Cloud, Minnesota).
- 100th annual convention – February 20, 2027 – hosted by Beta chapter (Minneapolis, Minnesota).

== Governance ==
The fraternity is governed by a national executive council that is elected at an annual convention. The executive council consists of a president, vice president, secretary, and treasurer. The vice president is the editor of the Electron.

== Chapters ==
=== Collegiate chapters ===
The collegiate chapters of Kappa Eta Kappa are designated by letters of the Greek alphabet. The following is a list of chapters; active chapters are in bold and inactive chapters are in italics.

Chapter	Charter date and range	Institution	Location	Status	Ref.
Alpha	February 10, 1923 – after 1932 (Note: Alpha chapter is documented in the University of Iowa Hawkeye yearbook from 1924 through 1932.)	University of Iowa	Iowa City, Iowa	Inactive	
**Beta**	May 26, 1923 – 1968; 1970	University of Minnesota	Minneapolis, Minnesota	Active	
Gamma	February 2, 1924 – after 1969 (Note: Kappa Eta Kappa membership at the University of Kansas is documented in the 1969 Jayhawker yearbook.)	University of Kansas	Lawrence, Kansas	Inactive	
**Delta**	February 9, 1924	University of Wisconsin–Madison	Madison, Wisconsin	Active	(Note: Chapter formed from the Technical Club (local).)
Epsilon	May 17, 1924 – after 1927 (Note: Epsilon chapter is documented in the 1927 MIT Technique yearbook.)	Massachusetts Institute of Technology	Cambridge, Massachusetts	Inactive	
Zeta	April 6, 1928 – after 1941 (Note: Zeta chapter is documented in Georgia Tech's Blue Print yearbooks in 1936 and 1941.)	Georgia Tech	Atlanta, Georgia	Inactive	
Eta	May 9, 1935 – after 1941 (Note: Eta chapter is described as active in the 1939 Kansas State Royal Purple; the 1941 Royal Purple also lists electrical engineering students as Kappa Eta Kappa members.)	Kansas State University	Manhattan, Kansas	Inactive	
Theta	April 6, 1957 – after 2000 (Note: Theta chapter's archived website lists Spring 2000 officers and members.)	Milwaukee School of Engineering	Milwaukee, Wisconsin	Inactive	
**Iota**	November 11, 1990	St. Cloud State University	St. Cloud, Minnesota	Active	

=== Alumni associations ===
Association	Location	Status	Ref.
**KHK Beta Alumni Association**	Minneapolis, Minnesota	Active	
**KHK Delta Alumni Association**	Madison, Wisconsin	Active	
**KHK Iota Alumni Association**	St. Cloud, Minnesota	Active	

== Notable members ==
- John H. Booske (Delta 1993, honorary) – University of Wisconsin–Madison Vilas Distinguished Achievement Professor
- Vannevar Bush (Epsilon) – electrical engineer, inventor, and science administrator; president of the Carnegie Institution for Science and builder of the differential analyzer
- Thomas W. Fitzgerald (Zeta 1941, honorary) – head of the School of Electrical Engineering at the Georgia School of Technology
- Alfred T. Goshaw (Delta) – James B. Duke Distinguished Professor Emeritus of Physics at Duke University; American Physical Society fellow
- Susan Hagness (Delta 2000, honorary) – chair of the Department of Electrical and Computer Engineering at the University of Wisconsin–Madison
- Oscar B. Hanson (Zeta 1928) – NBC director of engineering; 1940 Institute of Radio Engineers Medal of Honor
- John Oghalai (Delta) – chair of the USC Caruso Department of Otolaryngology–Head and Neck Surgery and Leon J. Tiber and David S. Alpert Chair in Medicine at the University of Southern California
