= Svein Rosseland =

Norwegian astrophysicist

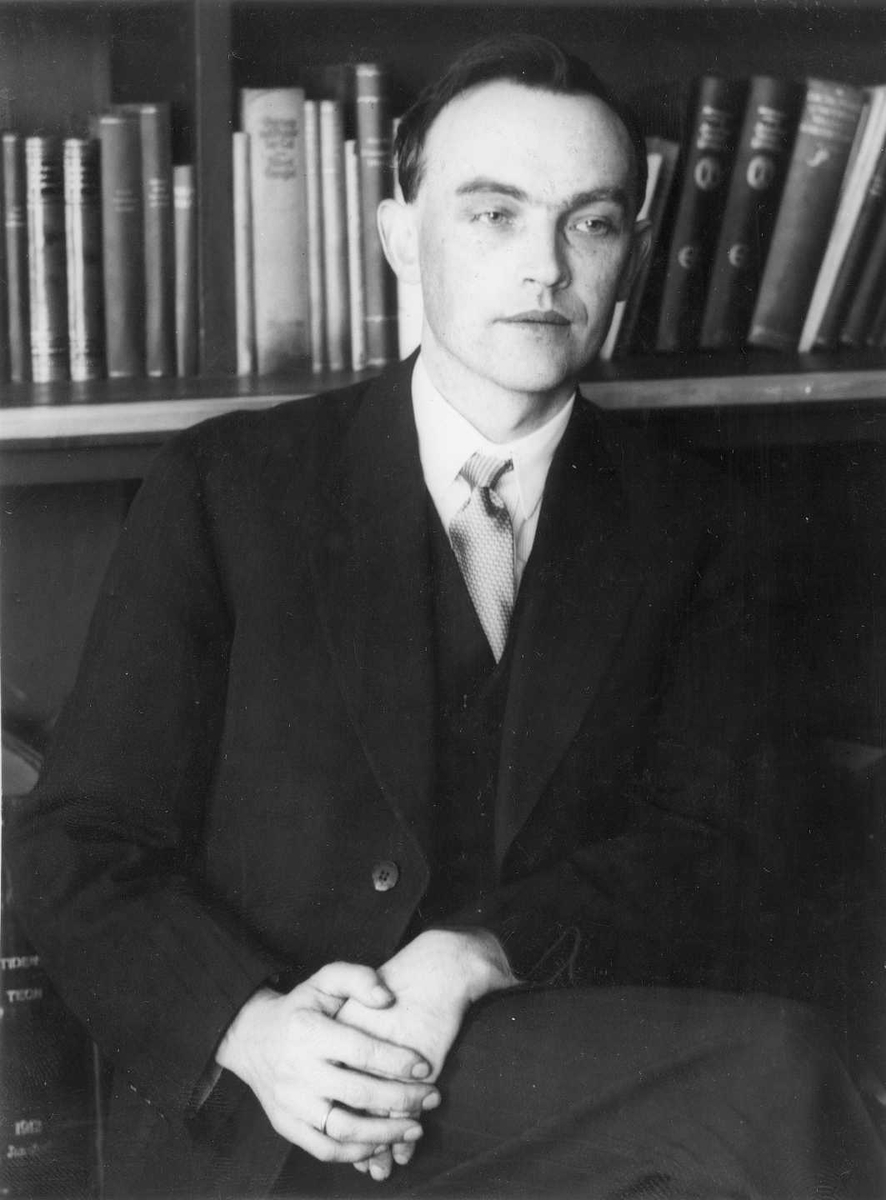
Svein Rosseland, ca. 1935

Svein Rosseland (March 31, 1894, in Vikør Municipality, Hardanger – January 19, 1985, in Bærum Municipality) was a Norwegian astrophysicist and a pioneer in the field of theoretical astrophysics.

== Biography ==
Svein Rosseland was born in Vikør Municipality (now called Kvam Municipality), in Hardanger, Norway. In 1920 he went to the Institute of Physics (now the Niels Bohr Institute) in Copenhagen, where he met Niels Bohr and other prominent physicists, and where he wrote two seminal papers. He spent 1924–1926 as a Rockefeller Fellow at the Mount Wilson Observatory in Pasadena, California.

In 1936 he published his textbook Theoretical Astrophysics, which contained numerous original contributions. Rosseland was instrumental in the effort behind the building of the Oslo Analyzer, finished in 1938 and for four years the world's most powerful differential analyzer.

Rosseland was Norwegian delegate to the CERN Council in the early days of the organization.

== Legacy ==
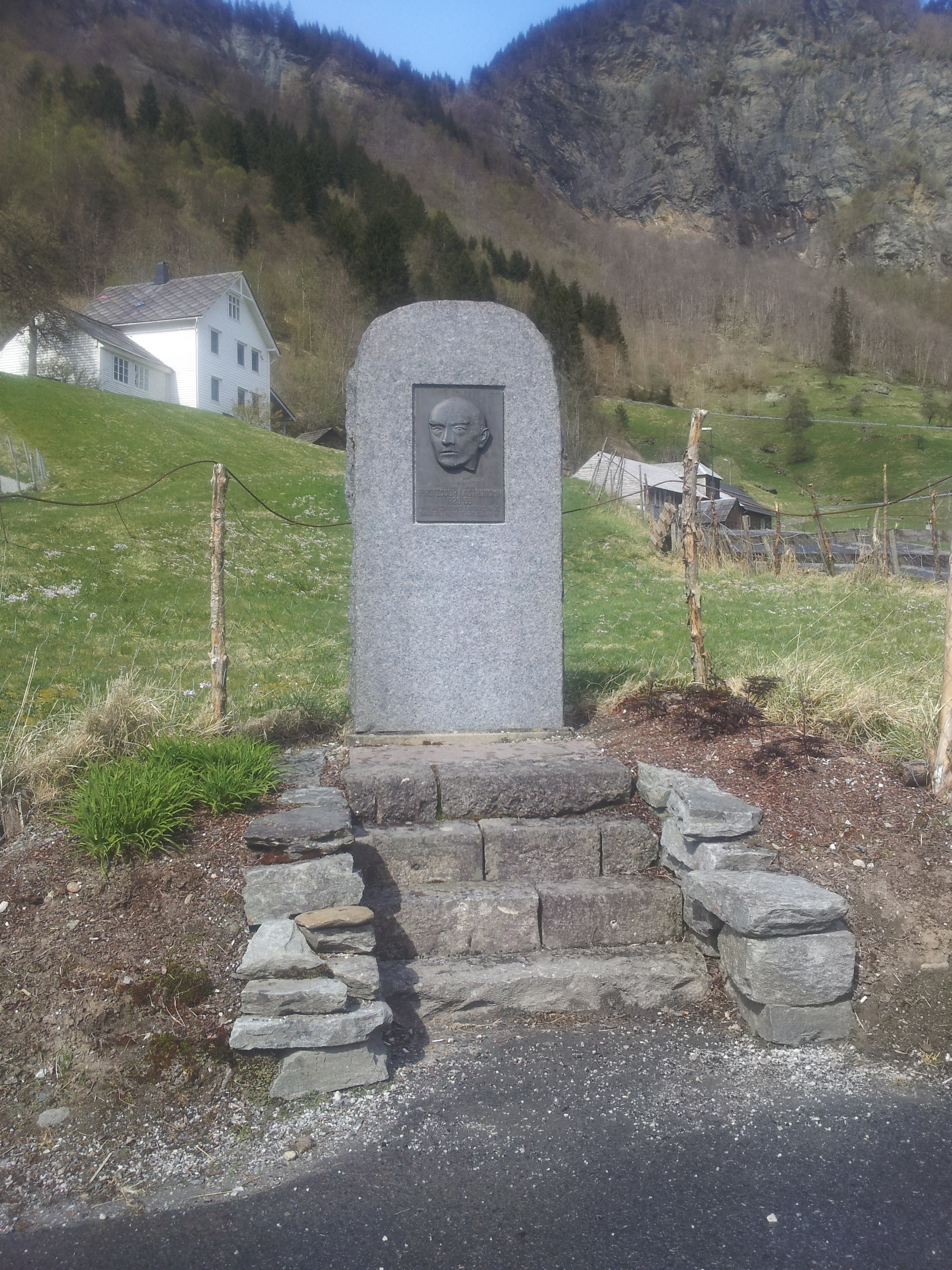
A bust at Steindalsfossen, Norway

In 1957 he was decorated Commander of the Royal Norwegian Order of St. Olav. The minor planet 1646 Rosseland and the lunar crater Rosseland are named after him, as is the Rosseland mean opacity. The Institute of Theoretical Astrophysics at the University of Oslo is housed in "Svein Rosseland's House". In honor of the 100th anniversary of his birth, the Svein Rosseland Centenary Symposium was held at the Norwegian Academy of Science and Letters in Oslo during June 1994. A bust of him was also erected at Steinsdalsfossen near his home in Norheimsund.

== Selected works ==
- On the Internal Constitution of the Stars, 1925
- The Principle of Quantum Theory, 1930
- On the Stability of Gaseous Stars, 1931
- Astrophysik auf atomtheoretischer Grundlage, 1931
- Theoretical Astrophysics, 1936
- Jorda og universet. Matematisk geografi, 1940
- The Pulsation Theory of Variable Stars, 1949
