= Winkles =

Winkles is a surname of English origin.

People with this name include:

- Henry Winkles (1801–1860) was an English architectural illustrator, engraver and printer, who, together with Karl Ludwig Frommel founded the first studio for steel engraving in Germany.
- Bobby Brooks Winkles (1930–2020) was an American baseball player and coach.
