= William Tombleson =

English artist, illustrator, engraver, writer and printmaker

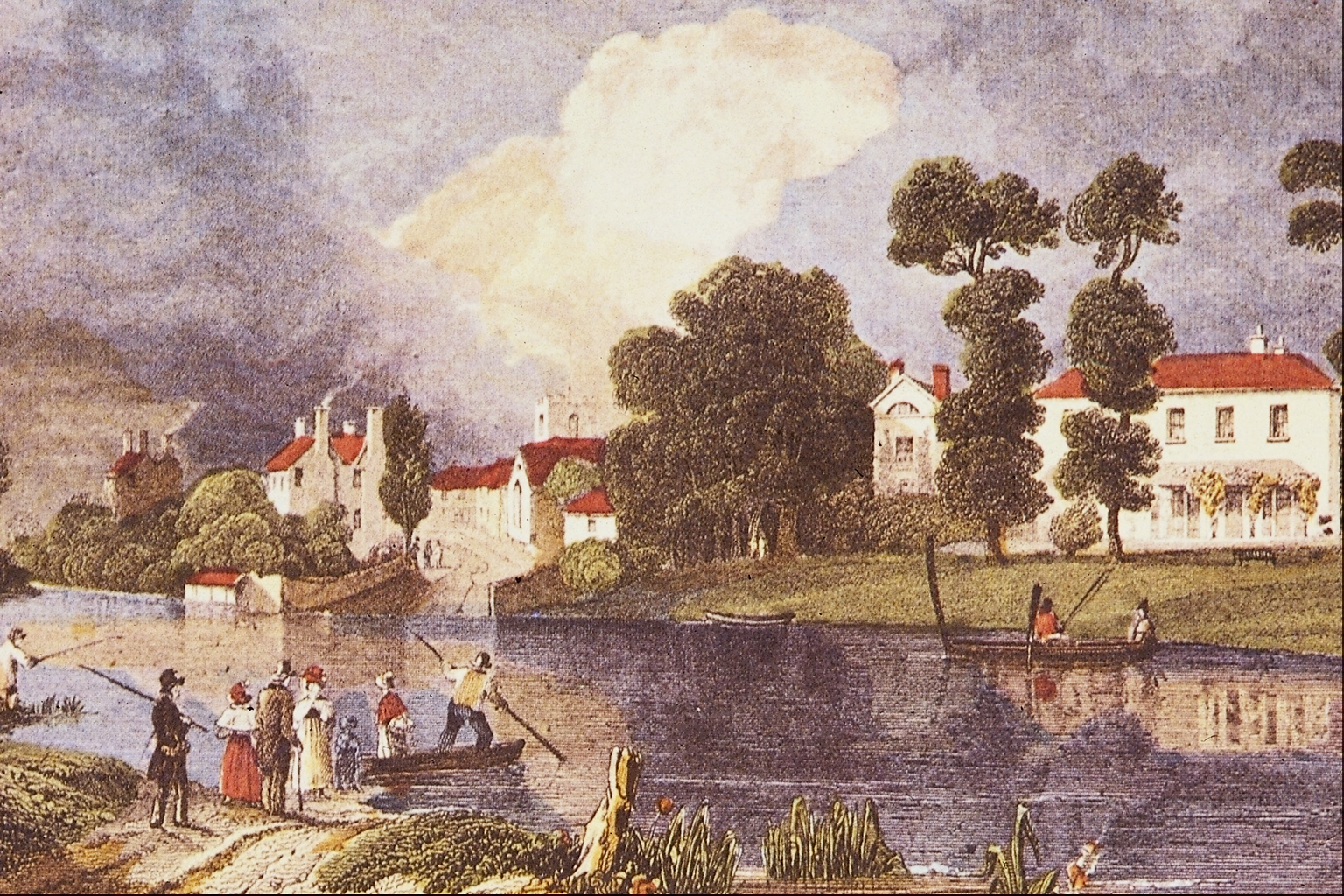
Shepperton, Middlesex

William Tombleson (1795 – c. 1846) was an English topographical and architecture artist, illustrator, copper and steel engraver, writer and printmaker, based in London.

== Life and works ==
In the 1830s, his topographical drawings of the upper and middle River Rhine in Germany, and of the rivers Thames and Medway in England were published as engraved prints and books (see bibliography). For volume 1 of "Views of the Rhine etc." he provided 69 illustrations - the book was also published in French and German editions.

Engravers who worked on Tombleson's drawings included Thomas Clark, John Cleghorn, T. Cox, R. Harris, W. Hood, J. Howe, W. Lacey, O. Smith, Shenfield, J. Stokes, D. Thompson, W. Tombleson, W. Watts, R. Wilson, H. Winkles and others.

== Selected bibliography ==
Illustrated by Tombleson:

- Fearnside, William Gray. Tombleson's Views of the Rhine from Cologne to Mainz(London: George Virtue, 1832) - French edition.
- Fearnside, William Gray. The Thames and Medway. A series of eighty engravings displaying the most picturesque waterside scenery of ten counties etc (London: Thomas Holmes, c. 1865).

Books with engravings by Tombleson:

- Brayley, E. W. A series of views of the most interesting remains of ancient castles of England and Wales (Longman, Hurst, Reese, Orme & Brown, 1823).
- Neale, J. P. Views of the Seats of Noblemen and Gentlemen (Sherwood Jones, and Co. London, 1824)
- Shepherd, Thomas & Elmes, James. Metropolitan improvements; or London in the nineteenth century (London: Jones & Co. 1827).

== Gallery of works ==
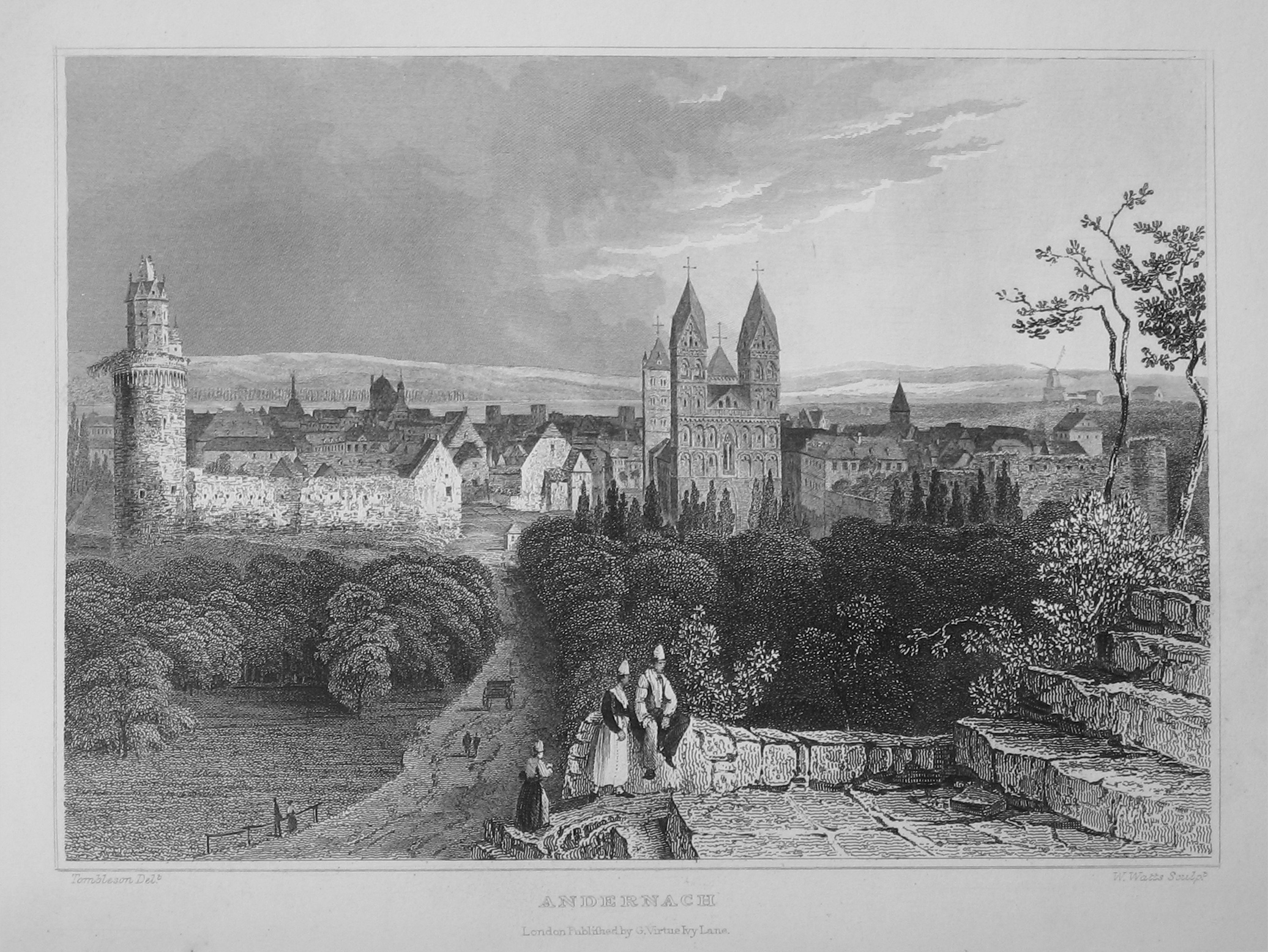
Andernach

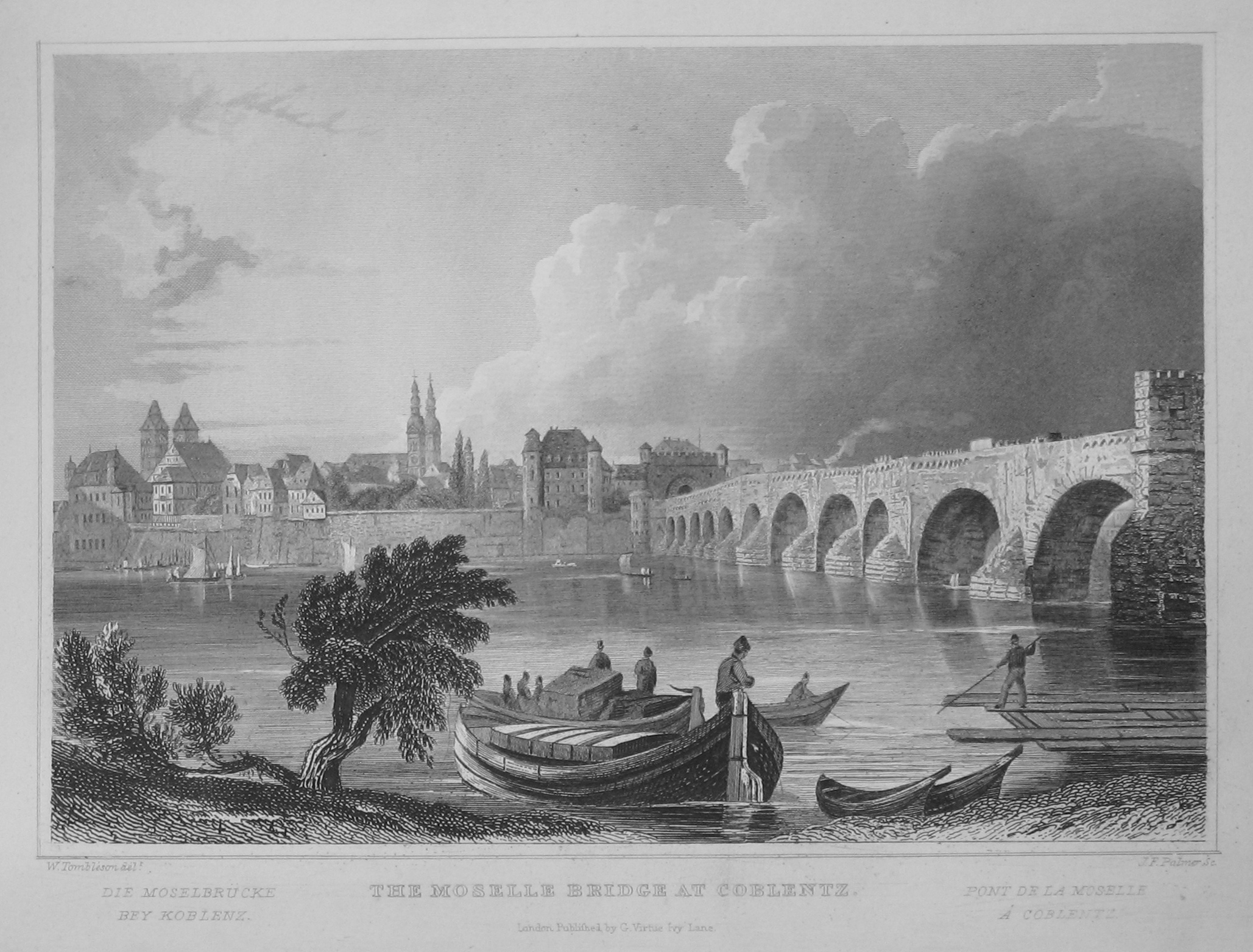
The Moselle Bridge at Coblentz

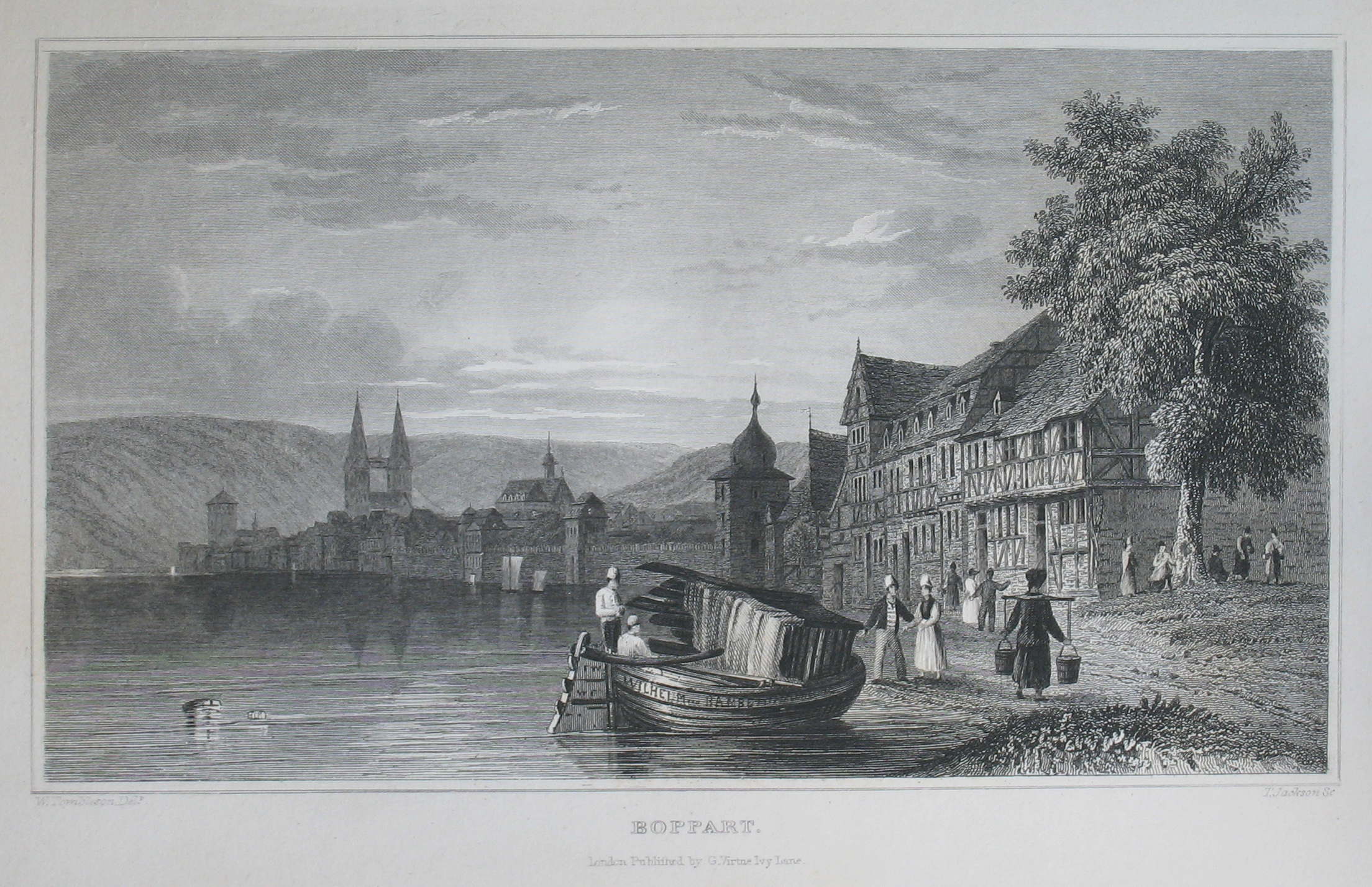
Boppard

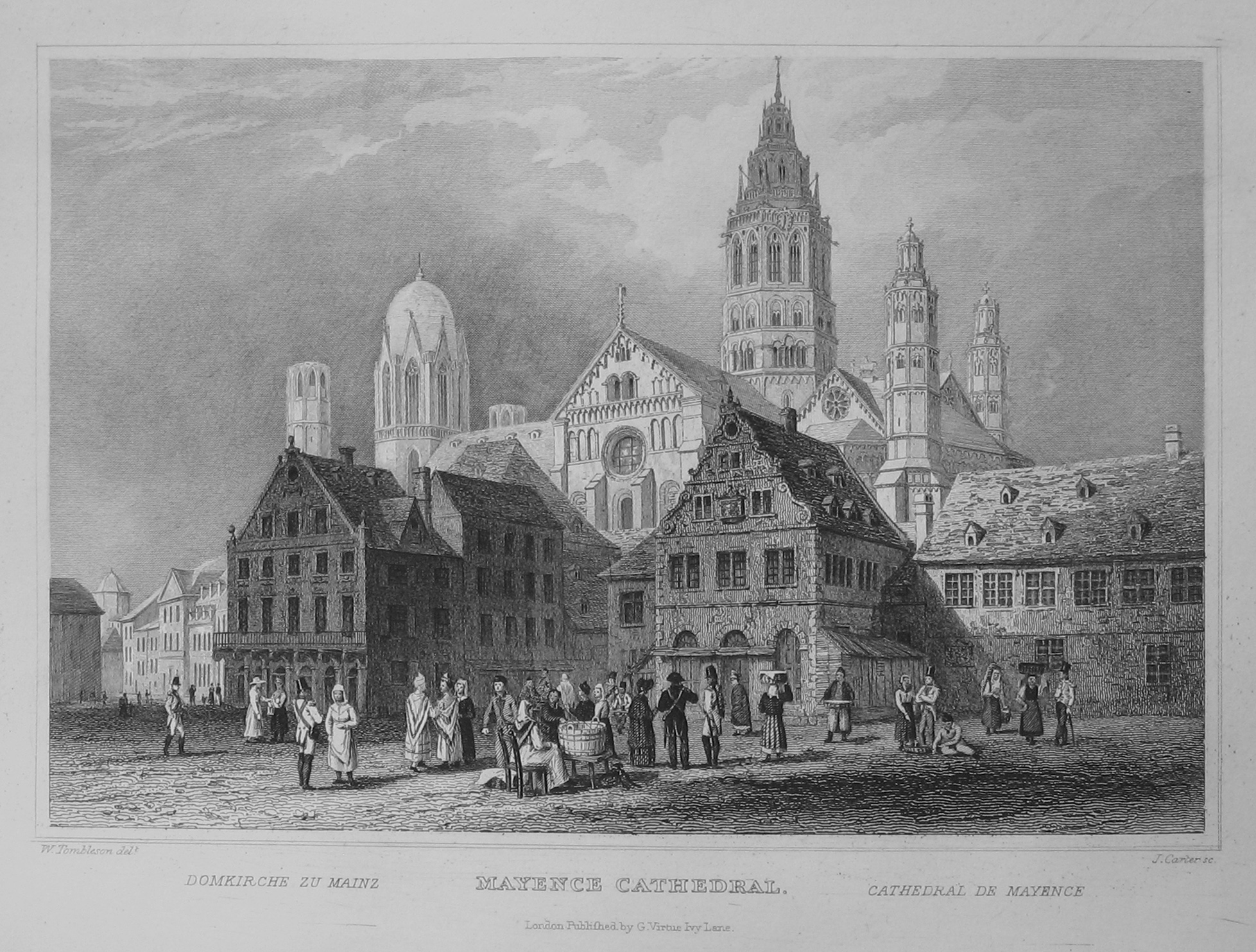
Mainz, Cathedral
