= Karl Ludwig Frommel =

German painter

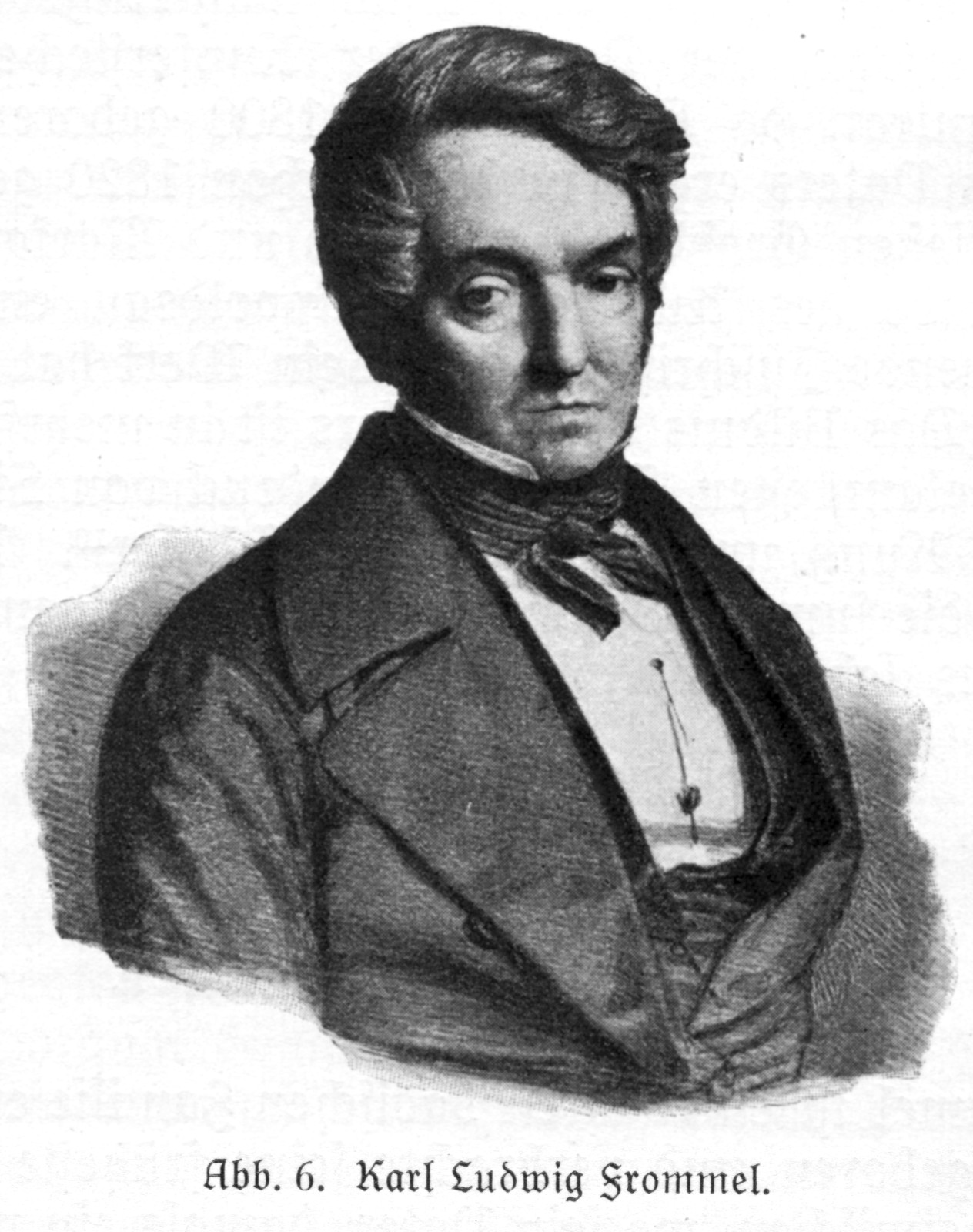
Karl Ludwig Frommel.

Pittoreskes Italien (1840)

Karl Ludwig Frommel (29 April 1789 – 6 February 1863) was a German landscape painter and engraver, born at Birkenfeld. He studied at Karlsruhe, under F. J. Becker and Haldenwang, visited Paris, and earned a considerable reputation in Italy (1812–17). He was appointed professor at Karlsruhe where he founded the Society of Art and Industry. After a visit to London (1824) to acquaint himself with the technique of steel engraving, he opened a studio, with Henry Winkles at Karlsruhe for that branch of art. From 1830 to 1858 he was director of the picture gallery, which flourished. He was the father of Emil Frommel.

== In popular culture ==
- Parodied in an episode of Animaniacs, wherein he is referred to as "Karl Ludwig Frommage" in a song about cheese, along with "Vincent van Gouda" and "John Bocconcini."

== See also ==
- List of German painters
