= John H. Booske =

American electrical and computer engineer

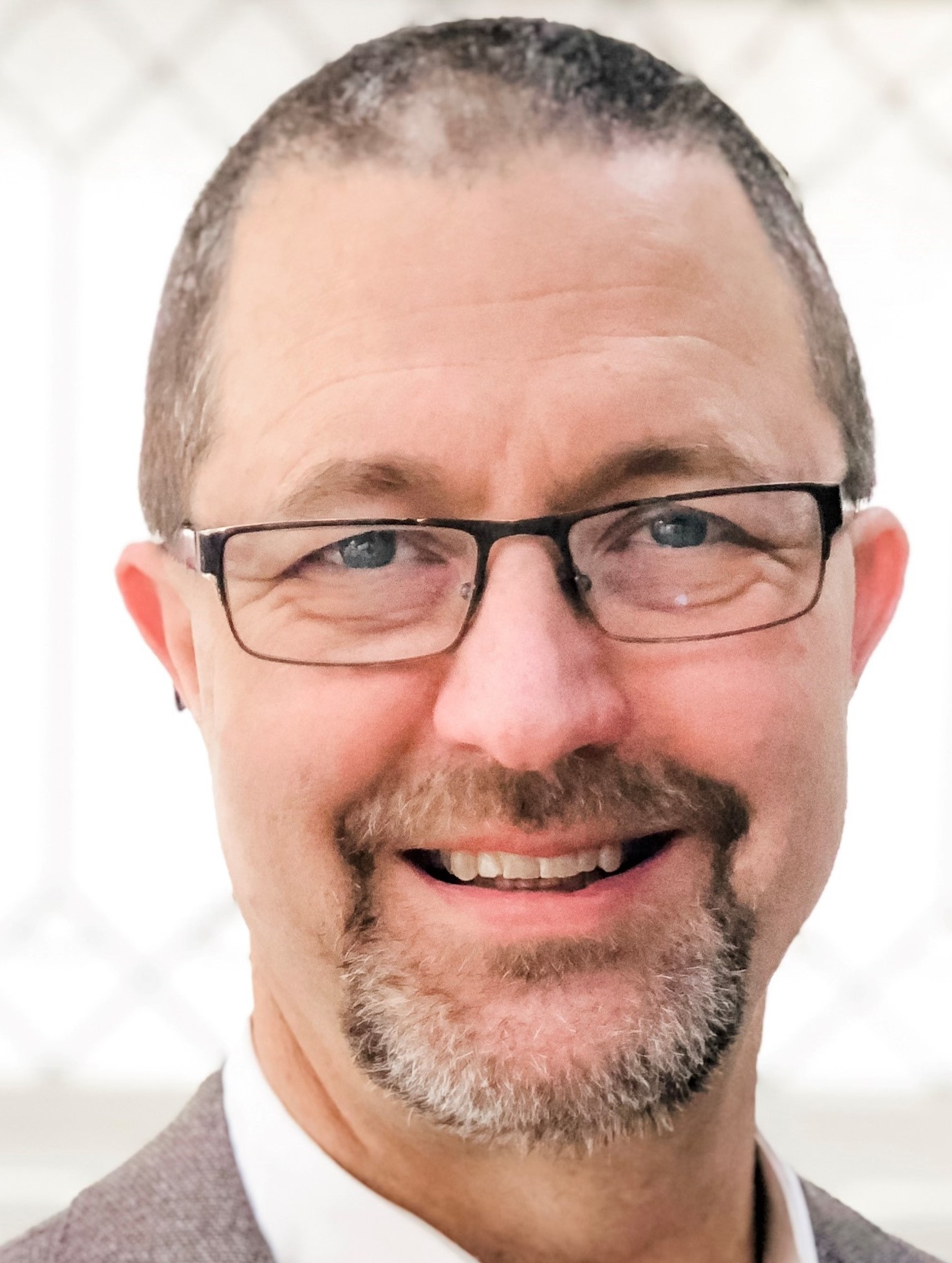
- Born: Manheim Township, Lancaster County, Pennsylvania, U.S.
- Spouse: Joanne Grassman

Academic background
- Education: Pennsylvania State University; University of Michigan
- Thesis: Whistler mode electron cyclotron resonance heating and emission in a magnetic mirror plasma (1985)
- Doctoral advisor: Ronald Gilgenbach

Academic work
- Institutions: Lawrence Livermore National Laboratory; University of Maryland; University of Wisconsin–Madison

John Henry Booske is an American electrical and computer engineer. He is the Duane H. and Dorothy M. Bluemke Professor and Vilas Distinguished Achievement Professor in electrical and computer engineering at the University of Wisconsin–Madison. His research interests include experimental and theoretical study of coherent electromagnetic radiation, its sources and its applications, spanning the RF, microwave, millimeter-wave, and THz regimes.

== Early life and education ==
Booske was born to father Henry in Manheim Township, Lancaster County, Pennsylvania, where he attended Manheim Township High School. Growing up, Booske swam competitively at the Lancaster County Pool where he set a record for the 17-and-under boys 200-meter freestyle relay team. He also attended Highland Presbyterian Church and was a member of the Eagle Scouts while enrolled in middle school. Booske continued to participate in the Scouts as he entered high school and was the recipient of a National Scholarship Merit Award to pay for his schooling at Pennsylvania State University.

Following high school, Booske graduated with the highest distinction in nuclear engineering from Pennsylvania State University in 1980 and immediately began working at Lawrence Livermore National Laboratory. While attending the university, Booske played on the Penn State water polo team and was a member of the Tau Beta Pi. As a result of his academic achievements, Booske received a full fellowship to attend the University of Michigan College of Engineering for graduate school. He completed his PhD in nuclear engineering from the University of Michigan in 1985.

== Career ==
Upon completing his PhD, Booske began working on a research project at the University of Maryland. He joined the Department of Electrical and Computer Engineering at the University of Wisconsin–Madison in 1990. As an assistant professor, Booske studied the properties of electromagnetic fields and waves and was the recipient of a Presidential Young Investigators Award for 1990 from the National Science Foundation. Within his first 10 years at the institution, he was the recipient of their Chancellor award and 2000 Benjamin Smith Reynolds Award for Excellence in Teaching. In 2005, Booske collaborated with Keith Thompson, David Larson, and Tom Kelly of Imago Scientific Instruments used Imago's local electrode atom probe microscope to pinpoint individual atoms of boron-a common additive, or dopant, in semiconductors-within a sea of silicon atoms. He published the results in a paper in Applied Physics Letters which demonstrated a way to image these vanishingly small devices by mapping them atom by atom.

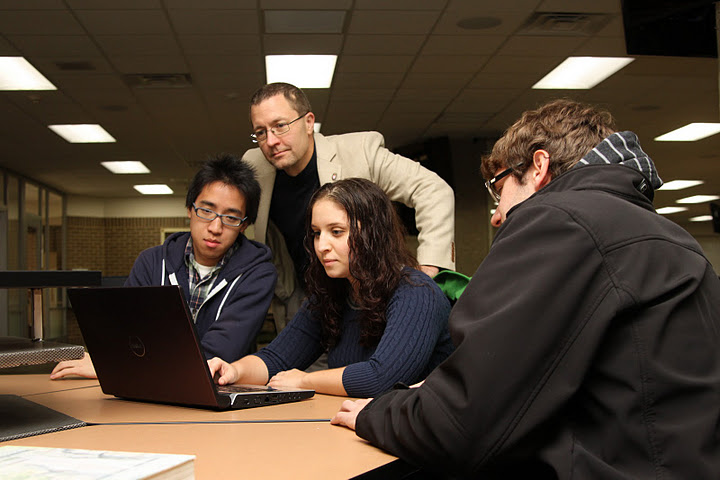
Booske in 2012

By 2011, Booske was elected a Fellow of the American Physical Society for "pioneering contributions to the development of coherent radiation sources in the submillimeter wave and terahertz regime." The following year, he helped launch the Wisconsin Collaboratory for Enhanced Learning in two UW-Madison libraries to "transform from a classroom, to a small group work space, to a place to study or get tutoring." In 2016, Booske and Dane Morgan received a $1.3 million grant from the Defense Advanced Research Projects Agency to synthesize large amounts of the material and further study its properties. They also set out to identify new materials that could act as electron sources.

In 2018, Booske and Susan Hagness were asked by Ben Tilberg of Ocean Spray Cranberries to develop a more efficient, technologically advanced method to count cranberries. The device they created automated the counting process without having to pick any berries. In recognition of his leadership in the Wisconsin Collaboratory for Enhanced Learning, Booske received the 2018 innovative program award from the Electrical and Computer Engineering Department Heads Association. Two years later, he was the recipient of the John R. Pierce Award for Excellence in Vacuum Electronics by the IEEE Electron Devices Society's Vacuum Electronics Technical Committee. He also established the Booske, John & Joanne Grassman Undergraduate Scholarship Fund with his wife Joanne to fund tuition for undergraduates.

== Selected publications ==
- Microwave and Radio Frequency Applications (2003)
- Modern Microwave and Millimeter-Wave Power Electronics
