= Oslo Analyzer =

Historic Norwegian computer, built between 1938 and 1942

The Oslo Analyzer (1938 – 1954) was a mechanical analog differential analyzer, a type of computer, built in Norway from 1938 to 1942. It was the largest computer of its kind in the world when completed.

The differential analyzer was based on the same principles as the pioneer machine developed by Vannevar Bush at MIT. It was designed and built by Svein Rosseland in cooperation with chief engineer Lie (1909-1983) of the Norwegian commercial instrument manufacturer Gundersen & Løken. The machine was installed at the first floor of the Institute for Theoretical Astrophysics at the University of Oslo. The building as well as the machine was financed in large parts by grants from The Rockefeller Foundation.

Rosseland visited MIT for several months in 1933, and studied Bush's work. Rosseland's design was a substantial development from Bush's machine, and much more compact. The machine had twelve integrators (compared to six of the original MIT machine) and could calculate differential equations of the twelfth order, or two simultaneous equations of the sixth order. When it was finished, the Oslo Analyzer was the most powerful of its kind in the world.

Upon the German occupation of Norway on April 9, 1940, Rosseland realized that the machine might become a desirable research tool in the German war effort. So Rosseland personally removed all precision fabricated integration wheels and buried the wheels in sealed packages in the garden behind the institute.

The machine contributed to a number of scientific projects, both domestic and international. When it was dismantled, sections of it were put on display at the Norwegian Museum of Science and Technology.
