= Coblentz =

Coblentz is a surname. Notable people with the surname include:

- Clara Rankin Coblentz (1863–1933), American social reformer
- Laban Coblentz (b. 1961), American writer and communications specialist
- William Coblentz (1873–1962), American scientist
- William Coblentz (1922–2010), California attorney and power broker
- Catherine Cate Coblentz, American writer of children's books
- Stanton A. Coblentz, American author and poet

== See also ==
- Koblenz, a town in Rhineland-Palatinate, Germany
- Koblenz, Switzerland, a municipality in Canton Aargau
- Coblentz (lunar crater), crater on the Moon
- Coblentz (Martian crater), crater on Mars
