= 1646 Rosseland =

Main-belt asteroid

Discovery
- Discovered by: Y. Väisälä
- Discovery site: Turku Obs.
- Discovery date: 19 January 1939

Designations
- Named after: Svein Rosseland (astrophysicist)
- Alternative designations: 1939 BG · 1937 QH; 1948 QR · 1955 NB; 1977 FK · 1980 ME
- Minor planet category: main-belt · (inner)

Orbital characteristics
- Epoch 4 September 2017 (JD 2458000.5)
- Uncertainty parameter 0
- Observation arc: 79.69 yr (29,105 days)
- Aphelion: 2.6435 AU
- Perihelion: 2.0771 AU
- Semi-major axis: 2.3603 AU
- Eccentricity: 0.1200
- Orbital period (sidereal): 3.63 yr (1,324 days)
- Mean anomaly: 320.86°
- Mean motion: 0° 16^{m} 18.48^{s} / day
- Inclination: 8.3787°
- Longitude of ascending node: 119.98°
- Argument of perihelion: 279.82°

Physical characteristics
- Dimensions: 11.48±3.28 km 11.50±2.88 km 12.130±0.007 km 12.801±0.231 km 12.85 km (calculated); 13.49±0.27 km
- Synodic rotation period: 68.9 h 69.2 h
- Geometric albedo: 0.18±0.10; 0.186±0.008; 0.19±0.07; 0.20 (assumed); 0.202±0.030; 0.2253±0.0341
- Spectral type: S
- Absolute magnitude (H): 11.82 · 11.97±0.11 · 12.06

1646 Rosseland, provisional designation 1939 BG, is a stony asteroid from the inner regions of the asteroid belt, approximately 12 kilometers in diameter. It was discovered on 19 January 1939, by Finnish astronomer Yrjö Väisälä at Turku Observatory in Southwest Finland. It was later named after Norwegian astrophysicist Svein Rosseland.

== Orbit and classification ==
The S-type asteroid orbits the Sun in the inner main-belt at a distance of 2.1–2.6 AU once every 3 years and 8 months (1,324 days). Its orbit has an eccentricity of 0.12 and an inclination of 8° with respect to the ecliptic. Rosseland was first observed at Johannesburg Observatory as 1937 QH, extending the body's observation arc by 2 years prior to its official discovery observation in 1939.

== Physical characteristics ==
=== Photometry ===
American astronomer Richard Binzel obtained the first rotational lightcurve of Rosseland in the early 1980s. It gave a rotation period of 69.2 hours with a brightness variation of 0.13 magnitude (U=2). During a survey of presumed slow rotators, photometric observations by Brazilian Cláudia Angeli and colleges gave a period of 69.2 hours and an amplitude of 0.45 magnitude (U=1).

=== Diameter and albedo ===
According to the surveys carried out by the Japanese Akari satellite and NASA's Wide-field Infrared Survey Explorer with its subsequent NEOWISE mission, Rosseland measures between 11.48 and 13.49 kilometers in diameter and its surface has an albedo between 0.18 and 0.2253. The Collaborative Asteroid Lightcurve Link assumes a standard albedo for stony asteroids of 0.20 and calculates a diameter of 12.85 kilometers with an absolute magnitude of 11.82.

== Naming ==
This minor planet was named in honor of renowned Norwegian astrophysicist Svein Rosseland (1894–1985), founder and first director of the Institute for Theoretical Astrophysics in Oslo. His work on the theory of stellar interiors included studies of stellar rotation and stability and the derivation of the Rosseland mean opacity. The lunar crater Rosseland is also named after him. The official naming citation was published by the Minor Planet Center on 20 February 1976 (M.P.C. 3932).
