= John Oghalai =

American otolaryngologist

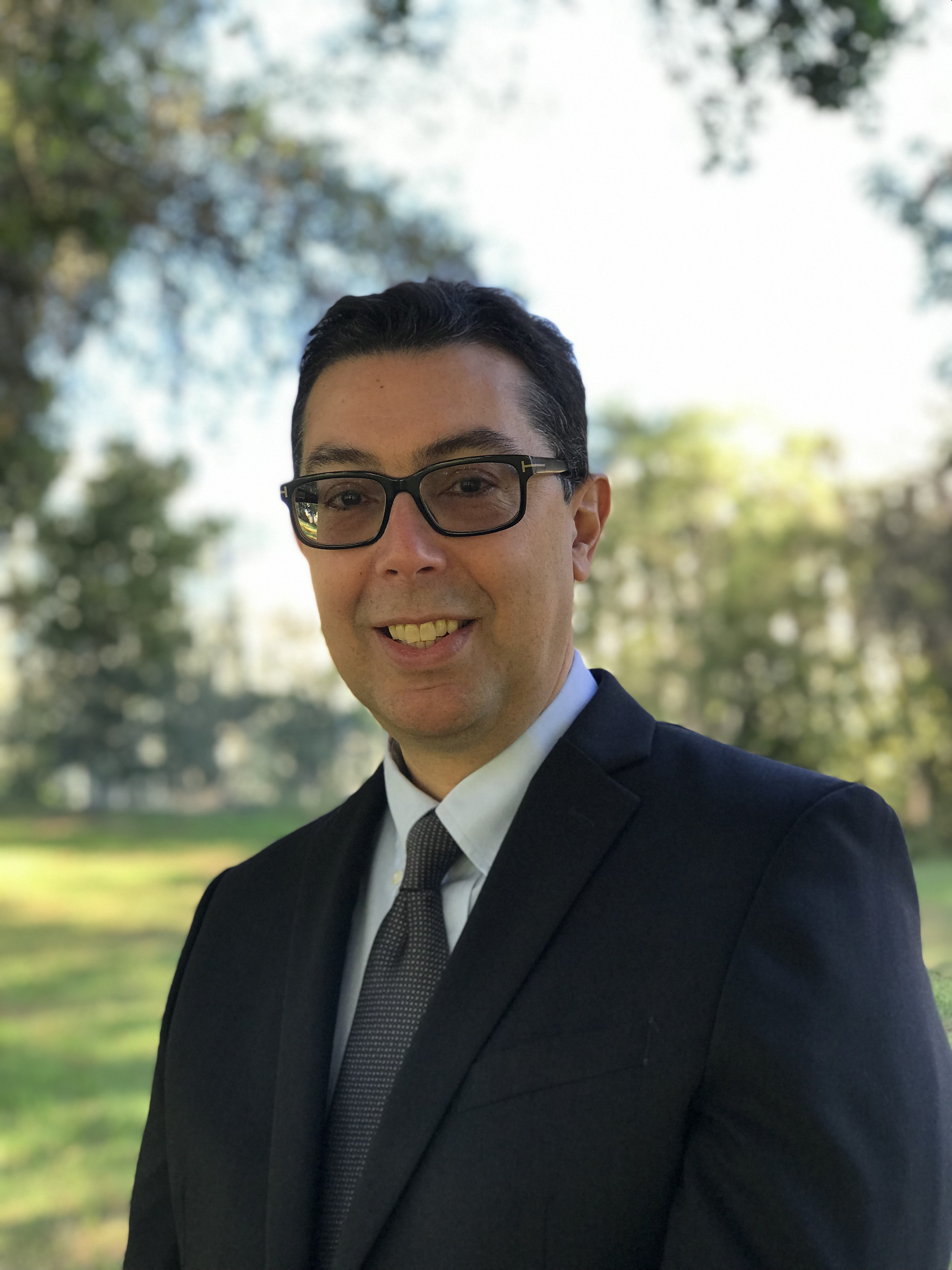
- Born: December 14, 1968; Wisconsin
- Education: University of Wisconsin–Madison
- Scientific career
- Fields: Otorhinolaryngology
- Workplaces: Baylor College of Medicine Stanford University School of Medicine Keck School of Medicine of USC

John Oghalai (born December 14, 1968) is an American physician and scientist. He is the Leon J. Tiber and David S. Alpert Chair in Medicine at the University of Southern California Keck School of Medicine and chair of the USC Caruso Department of Otolaryngology. Oghalai is an otolaryngologist. His research focuses on anatomical and molecular mechanisms in hearing and in ear and hearing disorders.

== Early life and education ==
Oghalai grew up in Madison (Wisconsin) with his father Rahim, mother Karen (née Herbert), and brother Mark, who also became a doctor. Oghalai went to a Madison High School and became an Eagle Scout in 1983. He received a Bachelor of Science degree in electrical engineering in 1990, and his medical degree in 1994, both at the University of Wisconsin at Madison.

== Career ==
In 2003, Oghalai joined the faculty at the Baylor College of Medicine as an assistant professor. He served as director at The Hearing Center at Texas Children's Hospital in Houston, TX in 2005. He became an associate professor at Baylor in 2009.

In 2010, Oghalai moved to Stanford University School of Medicine as an associate professor and became a full professor in 2015. He became professor of otolaryngology and director of the Children's Hearing Center at Stanford's Lucile Packard Children's Hospital in 2016.

In 2017, Oghalai moved to University of Southern California to become chair of the Caruso Department of Otolaryngology at the Keck School of Medicine.

As an otolaryngology clinician, Oghalai has treated patients with issues that include noise-induced hearing loss, benign paroxysmal positional vertigo (BPPV), Bell's palsy and Ramsay Hunt Syndrome. In addition, Oghalai treated rare diseases such as cholesteatoma.

== Research ==
In a 2000 study, Oghalai and colleagues examined incidence of benign paroxysmal positional vertigo (BPPV) in geriatric patients at a Houston hospital. They found that 9% of the sample population had undiagnosed BPPV, a predictor of fall risk, depression, and difficulties with daily activities.

To help understand mechanisms of hearing loss brought on by explosive pressures such as those soldiers experience when exposed to roadside bombs, in 2013 Oghalai and his team studied blast effects on hearing in mice. They found that the main traumatic damage leading to noise-induced hearing loss was to cochlear hair and nerve cells, the cells responsible for translating pressure waves into the nerve signals in hearing.

In 2018, Oghalai and colleagues studied molecular dimensions of noise-induced hearing loss in mice by using optical coherence tomography, an imaging technique that allows in vivo (instead of invasive) observation and measurement. They found that after blasts damage hair cells, there is also a build up of ionized potassium in cochlear fluid. The findings showed how high concentrations of potassium disrupts hair and nerve cells, whose degeneration or synaptopathy contributes to hearing loss.

In 2022 Oghalai and colleagues published results for a longitudinal study on the effects of cochlear implants on deaf children with developmental delays. They compared cohorts of children who received the implants to a cohort of children who, due to insurance protocols, were only given hearing aids. The children who received implants showed improved cognitive and behavioral functioning.

== Personal life ==
John Oghalai is married to Tracy Nguyen-Oghalai, a rheumatologist. They have two sons, Kevin and Tom.

== Selected publications ==
- Oghalai, JS; Manolidis, S; Barth, JL; Stewart, MG; Jenkins, HA (2000). "Unrecognized Benign Paroxysmal Positional Vertigo in Elderly Patients". Otolaryngology–Head and Neck Surgery. 122 (5): 630–634. doi:10.1016/S0194-5998(00)70187-2. PMID 10793337. S2CID 33401924.
- Oghalai, JS; Zhao, HB; Kutz, JW; Brownell, WE (2000). "Voltage- and tension-dependent lipid mobility in the outer hair cell plasma membrane". Science. 287 (5453): 658–61. doi:10.1126/science.287.5453.658. PMC 1976274. PMID 10650000.
- Chai, R; Wang, T; Liaw, EJ; Xia, A; Jan, TA; Liu, Z; Taketo, MM; Oghalai, JS; Nusse, R; Zuo, J; Cheng, AG (22 May 2012). "Wnt signaling induces proliferation of sensory precursors in the postnatal mouse cochlea". Proc Natl Acad Sci U S A. 109 (22): 8167–72. doi:10.1073/pnas.1202774109. PMC 3361451. PMID 22562792.
- Lee, HY; Raphael, PD; Park, J; Ellerbee, AK; Applegate, BE; Oghalai, JS (10 March 2015). "Noninvasive in vivo imaging reveals differences between tectorial membrane and basilar membrane traveling waves in the mouse cochlea". Proc Natl Acad Sci U S A. 112 (10): 3128–33. doi:10.1073/pnas.1500038112. PMC 4364183. PMID 25737536.
