= Catherine Cate Coblentz =

American children's writer

- Coblentz in 1947
- Born: June 5, 1897; Hardwick, Vermont
- Died: May 30, 1951 (aged 53)
- Education: George Washington University
- Spouse: William Coblentz (m. 1924)
- Writing career
- Genre: Children's book
- Notable awards: Newbery Honor 1950; Lewis Carroll Shelf 1958; for The Blue Cat of Castle Town

Catherine Cate Coblentz (June 5, 1897 – May 30, 1951) was an American writer, best known for her children's books in the 1930s and 1940s. She was a Lewis Carroll Shelf Award and Newbery Honor laureate.

== Life and work ==
Born in Hardwick, Vermont, Catherine Cate worked during World War I at the National Bureau of Standards in Washington, D.C., where she met her future husband, William Coblentz, an American scientist who was a pioneer in the field of infrared spectroscopy. They were married on June 10, 1924. Two daughters were born to the couple, but both died young.

Coblentz published a poem on Mars in Popular Astronomy magazine in 1924, the same year that her husband was measuring the temperature of Mars at the Lowell Observatory. Mrs. Coblentz later achieved success as a writer of children's books, and her The Blue Cat of Castle Town won the Lewis Carroll Shelf Award in 1958 and was a Newbery Honor book. Older copies of this work and some of her other books can still be found, and some are considered to be collector's items.

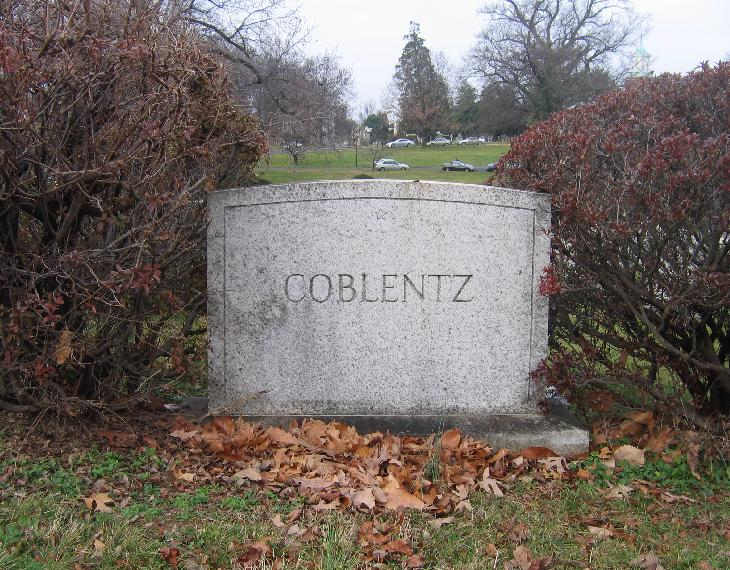
Marker for the Coblentz family in Rock Creek Cemetery, Washington

In 1930 Coblentz received a B.A. degree from George Washington University. In honor of her later work, she was presented with a Distinguished Alumni Achievement Award by her alma mater in 1945.

In the mid-to-late 1940s, Coblentz was instrumental in raising money to buy the land on which the Cleveland Park Neighborhood Library was built on Connecticut Avenue in Washington, D.C. A set of windows, with illustrations based on her books, remain on display in the library.

Catherine Cate Coblentz, her husband, and an infant daughter are buried in Rock Creek Cemetery in Washington, D.C. (Section O).

== Books ==
The dates of publication are approximate.

- Animal Pioneers (1936)
- The Blue and Silver Necklace (1937)
- The Pan American Highway (1942)
- The Falcon of Eric the Red ( 1942)
- The Bells of Leyden (1944)
- The Amazon (1944)
- Sequoya (1946)
- Scatter, the Chipmunk (1946)
- Martin and Abraham Lincoln (1947)
- "The Blue Cat of Castle Town". digital.library.upenn.edu. 1949.
- Ah-yo-ka: Daughter of Sequoya (1950)
- The Beggars' Penny (1943)
