= Coblentz (lunar crater) =

Lunar impact crater

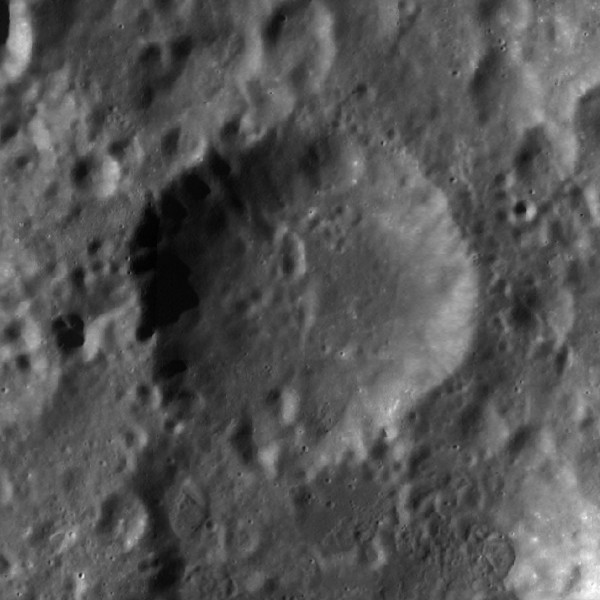
- LRO WAC image
- Coordinates: 37.9°S 126.1°E
- Diameter: 32.66 km (20.29 mi)
- Depth: Unknown
- Colongitude: 234° at sunrise

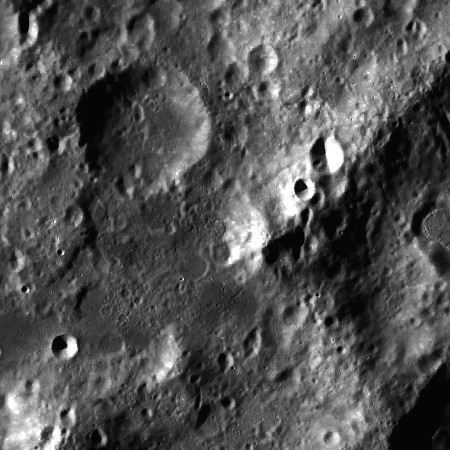
Patches of lower and higher albedo south and east of Coblenz

Coblentz is a small lunar impact crater that is located on the far side of the Moon, to the south of the much larger crater Bolyai.

This crater retains a circular rim, but it has been worn by impact erosion. This is particularly so at the southern end where an irregular gap exists in the rim. The interior floor is relatively featureless save for several tiny craterlets. A ridge arcs from the northwest rim of Coblentz to join the southern rim of Bolyai. There are several patches of dark (low albedo) material just to the south and southwest of Coblentz, while higher albedo surfaces lie to the east and southeast.

This crater is named after American physicist and astronomer William W. Coblentz (1873–1962). Its designation was officially adopted by the International Astronomical Union in 1970.
