= Henry Winkles =

English engraver and printer (1801–1860)

Henry Winkles (1801–1860) was an English architectural illustrator, engraver and printer, who, together with Karl Ludwig Frommel founded the first studio for steel engraving in Germany.

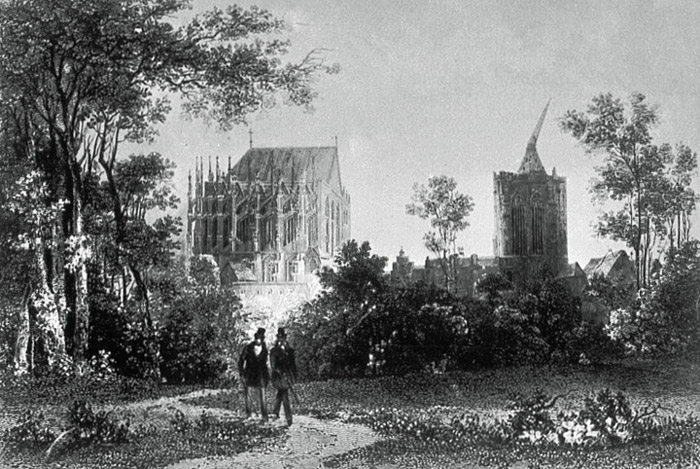
Botanic Garden and cathedral, Cologne, 1820 - engraved by Henry Winkles

In 1836, with Benjamin Winkles, he produced and helped to engrave three volumes of "Winkles's architectural and picturesque illustrations of the cathedral churches of England and Wales". This featured illustrators such as Hablot Knight Browne (the famous "Phiz" of Charles Dickens fame) and architect Robert Garland (1808–1863), with text (and some engraving) by Thomas Moule. These books helped to inspire the 19th century Gothic revival in architecture in Britain.

== Books ==
- Henry and Benjamin Winkles. Winkles's Architectural and picturesque illustrations of the cathedral churches of England and Wales (London: Effingham Wilson and Charles Tilt, 1836–1842):

Vol 1.
Vol 2.
Vol 3.

- John Tallis. Illustrated Atlas and Modern History of the World, illustrated by H. Winkles:
- G. Heck. Iconographic Encyclopaedia of Science, Literature, and Art, engraving by H. Winkles:
- William Tombleson. Tombleson's Views of the Thames and Medway (Tombleson & Co., 1833).
