= Ronald Gilgenbach =

American academic

Ronald M. Gilgenbach is the Chair of the Nuclear Engineering and Radiological Sciences Department at the University of Michigan. His career is in the field of Plasma Physics, including some of the earliest tokamak plasma research in the United States. Gilgenbach has been at the University of Michigan since 1980 and has held his Chair position since 2010. He is also the lead faculty of the Plasma, Pulsed Power, and Microwave Laboratory at the University of Michigan.

== Biography ==
Gilgenbach attended the University of Wisconsin for both his undergraduate degree in Electrical Engineering and M.S. in electrical engineering in 1972 and 1973, respectively. He went on to receive his Ph.D. also in electrical engineering at Columbia University in 1978. During this same period, he was involved with Bell Labs as part of the technical staff. After completing his Ph.D,, Gilgenbach performed gyrotron research at the Naval Research Lab as well as the first electron cyclotron heating experiments on a tokamak plasma in the US at Oak Ridge National Laboratory. Since then, he has been at the University of Michigan where he has published approximately 150 journal articles and has supervised ~50 graduated Ph.D. students. His work at the university has been on particle accelerators, plasma physics, pulsed power, and microwave research. Gilgenbach helped update the University of Michigan's plasma coursework and maintain the nuclear engineering department.

== Honors ==
- NSF Presidential Young Investigator Award (1984)
- Outstanding Young Engineer Award from the American Nuclear Society (1984)
- UM College of Engineering Research Award (1993)
- American Physical Society Division of Plasma Physics Fellow (1996)
- IEEE Plasma Sciences and Applications Committee (PSAC) Award (1997)
- IEEE Fellow (2006)
- Outstanding Professional Award from IEEE Southeast Michigan Section (2006)
- IEEE Fellow (2006)
