= Charles Stedman =

British Army officer

Charles Stedman (1753 – 26 June 1812) was a British Army officer who fought in the American War of Independence and afterwards wrote a detailed history on the conflict.

== Biography ==
Charles Stedman, born at Philadelphia in 1753, was the second son of Alexander Stedman (1703–1794) and Elizabeth Chancellor. (Note: Stedman was of a family that claims descent from Andrew Barton the Scottish privateer. According to the Stedman tradition, Andrew Barton left an only son, Charles, who married Susan Stedman of Leith and took his wife's name. His descendants acquired land in Kinross-shire, and supplied many ministers to the kirk. Alexander Stedman (1703–1794), became an advocate and a Jacobite, but was compelled to fly the country after the Battle of Culloden, together with two of his brothers. He found refuge at Philadelphia, where he was ultimately appointed a judge of the supreme court. On the declaration of independence he withdrew to England and died at Swansea in 1794. He married Elizabeth Chancellor, the daughter of an immigrant to America from Somerset, who had been captured during the Spanish war and brought up in a convent.)

Stedman was educated for the law at the College of William & Mary in Virginia. Like his father, he remained loyal to the British crown, and, on the start of the American War of Independence, he was appointed commissary to the troops under the command of Sir William Howe. His knowledge of the German language, presumably acquired from early intercourse with the numerous German settlers in Pennsylvania, stood him in good stead, both as interpreter with the Hessian auxiliaries, and afterwards as commander of a rifle corps of colonists from the Palatinate. He was twice taken prisoner, and sentenced to be hanged as a rebel; but on each occasion he managed to escape, once from the same prison that held the ill-fated Major John André. He was also twice severely wounded.

On the conclusion of peace in 1783, he retired to England on the half-pay of a colonel. He was one of those appointed to examine and settle the claims of the American loyalists. Through the influence of the Lord Cornwallis, Lord Rawdon's predecessor in the command, Stedman was in 1797, appointed to the office of deputy controller and accountant-general of the revenue of stamps, with reversion to the chief controllership, which, however, never fell in. He died on 26 June 1812, and was buried at Paddington.

== Family ==
Stedman married Mary Bowen, by whom he had one son, John, who became judge of the court of admiralty at Gibraltar, and compiled a genealogical memoir of the family (1857).

== Bibliography ==
In 1794 Stedman's History of the Origin, Progress, and Termination of the American War (2 vols. London, 4to, with folding maps and plans; and in the same year 2 vols., Dublin, 8vo) was published, which still remains the standard work on the subject. It is dedicated to Lord Rawdon, Earl of Moira, his former commander-in-chief. Shortly after it appeared Sir Henry Clinton printed Some Observations upon Mr. Stedman's History (4to, 1794), which question the author's accuracy.
