= 4th (Queen Augusta) Guards Grenadiers =

Infantry regiment of the Prussian Army

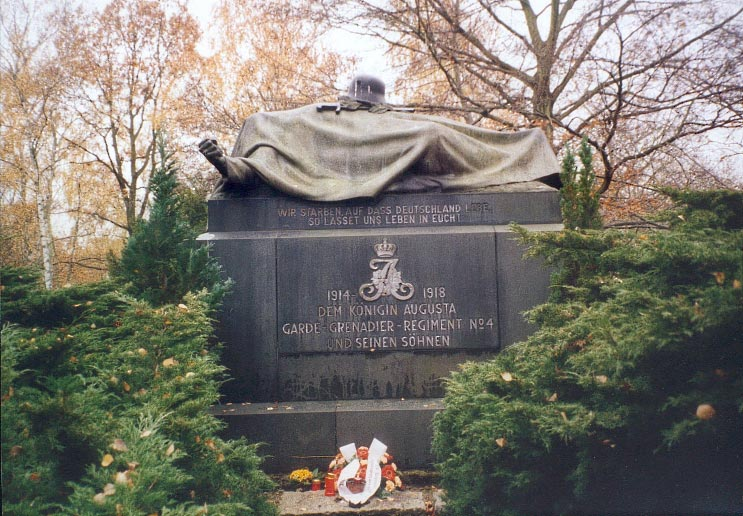
Memorial for the War 1914–1918

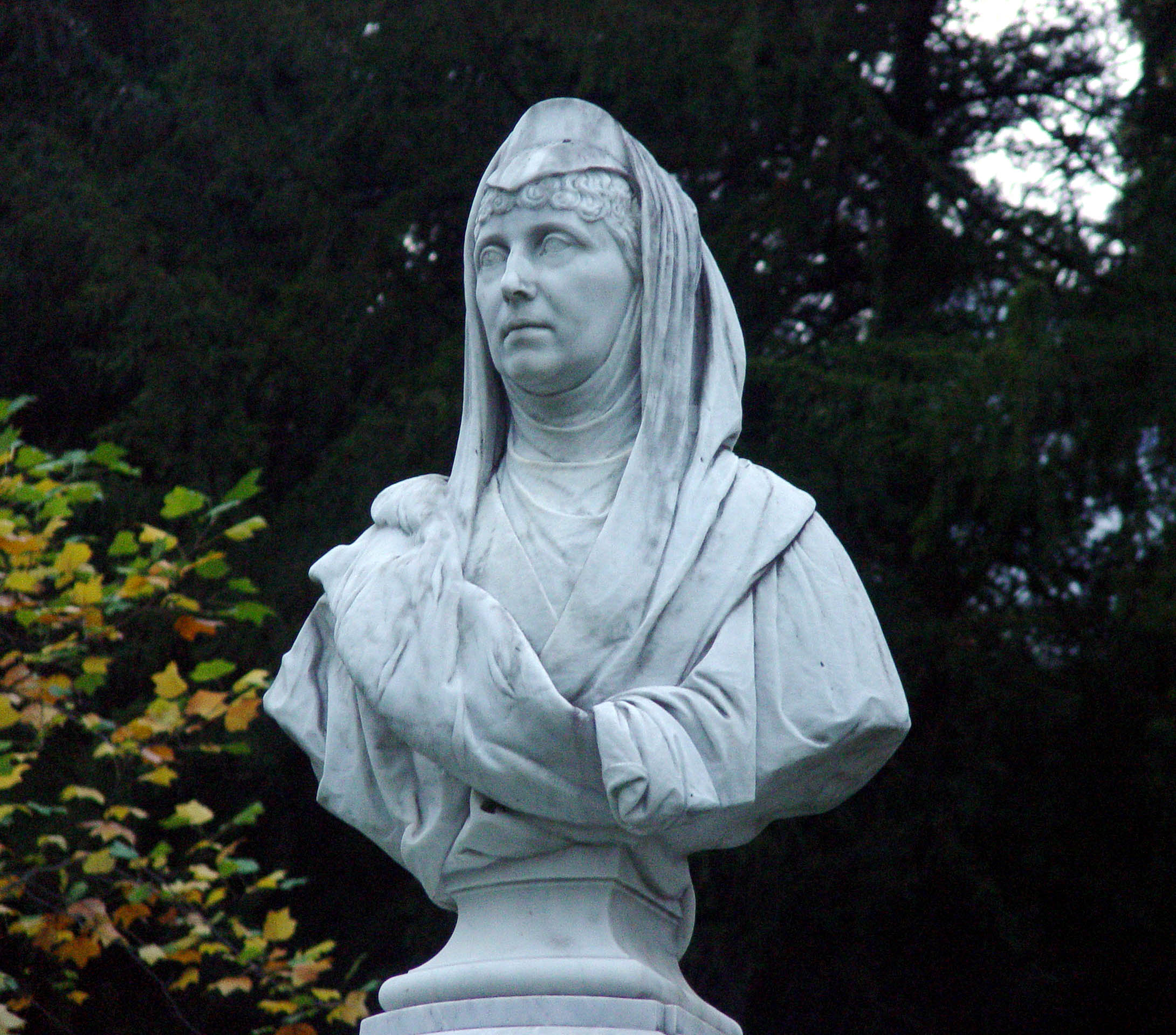
Queen Augusta (1811–1890)

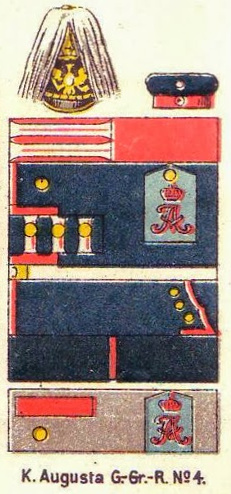
Details of the Regiment

The 4th (Queen Augusta) Guards Grenadier Regiment (Königin Augusta Garde-Grenadier-Regiment Nr. 4) was an infantry regiment of the Royal Prussian Army. It was established in 1860 in Koblenz and until 1893 it was the only one of the Prussian Guards outside the region around the German capital Berlin. The Regiment was a part of the 2nd Guards Infantry Division, where the regiment would fight on The Western Front until the end of the war.

The regiment was named after Queen Augusta in 1890 - to commemorate her death. The Guards moved to Spandau in 1893 and in 1897 to Moabit. The regiment's last commander was Walter Freiherr von Schleinitz (1872–1950) in the summer of 1918.

== See also ==
- List of Imperial German infantry regiments
