= Differential analyser =

Mechanical analogue computer to solve differential equations

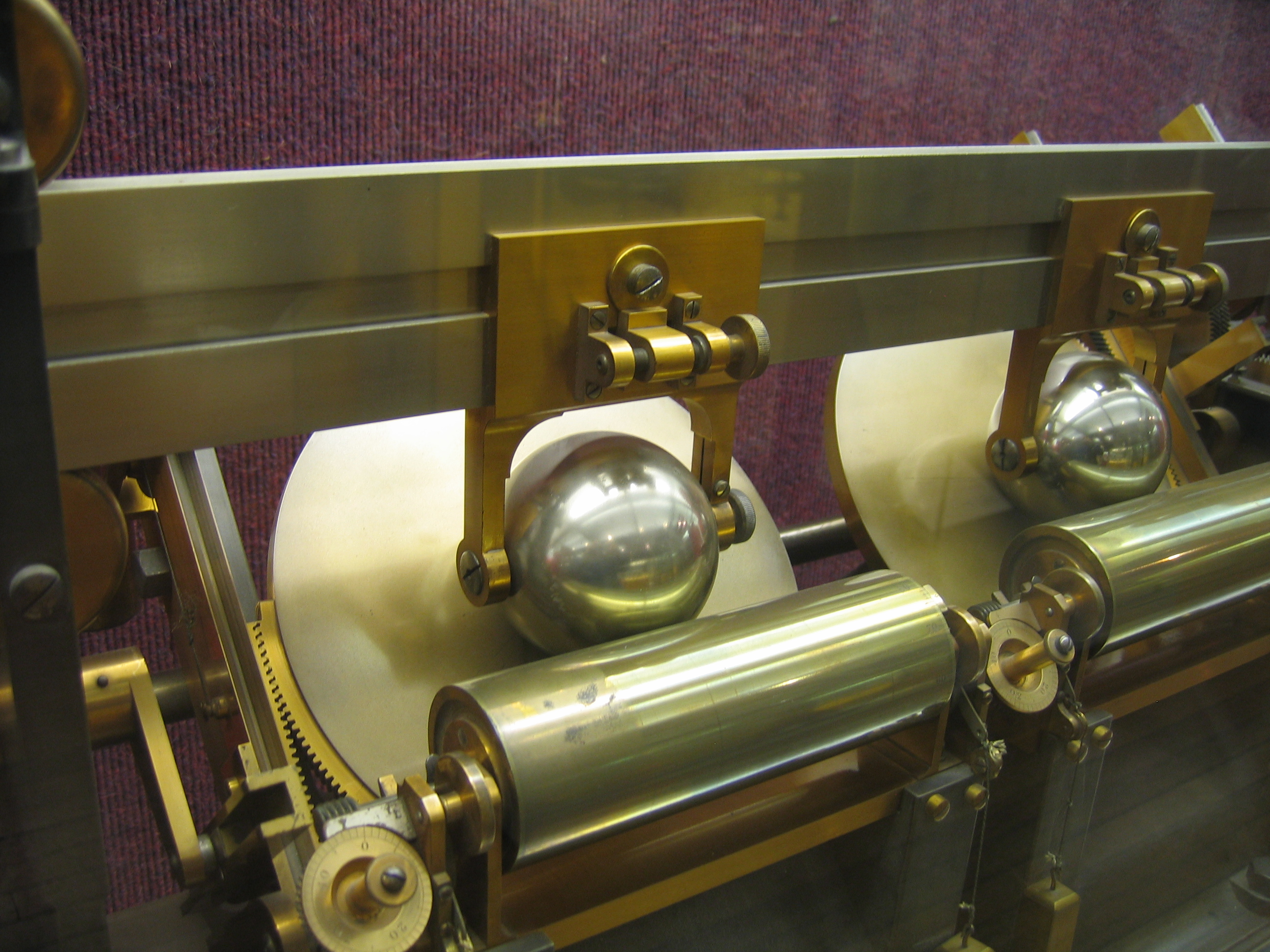
Ball-and-disc integrator for studying tides

The differential analyser is a mechanical analogue computer designed to solve differential equations by integration, using wheel-and-disc mechanisms to perform the integration. It was one of the first advanced computing devices to be used operationally. In addition to the integrator devices, the machine used an epicyclic differential mechanism to perform addition or subtraction - similar to that used on a front-wheel drive car, where the speed of the two output shafts (driving the wheels) may differ but the speeds add up to the speed of the input shaft. Multiplication/division by integer values was achieved by simple gear ratios; multiplication by fractional values was achieved by means of a multiplier table, where a human operator would have to keep a stylus tracking the slope of a bar. A variant of this human-operated table was used to implement other functions such as polynomials.

== History ==
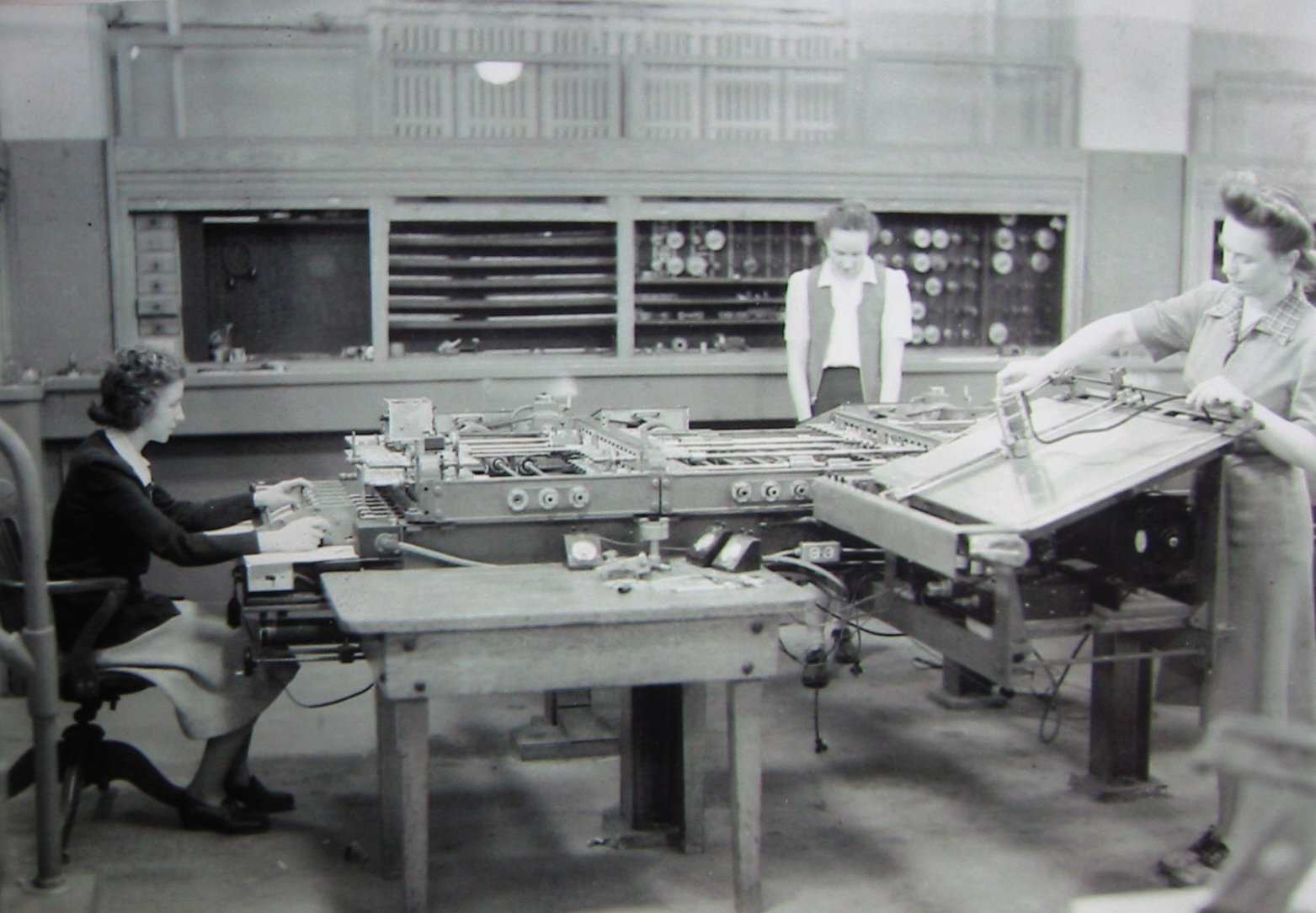
Kay McNulty, Alyse Snyder, and Sis Stump operate the differential analyser in the basement of the Moore School of Electrical Engineering, University of Pennsylvania, Philadelphia, Pennsylvania, c. 1942–1945.

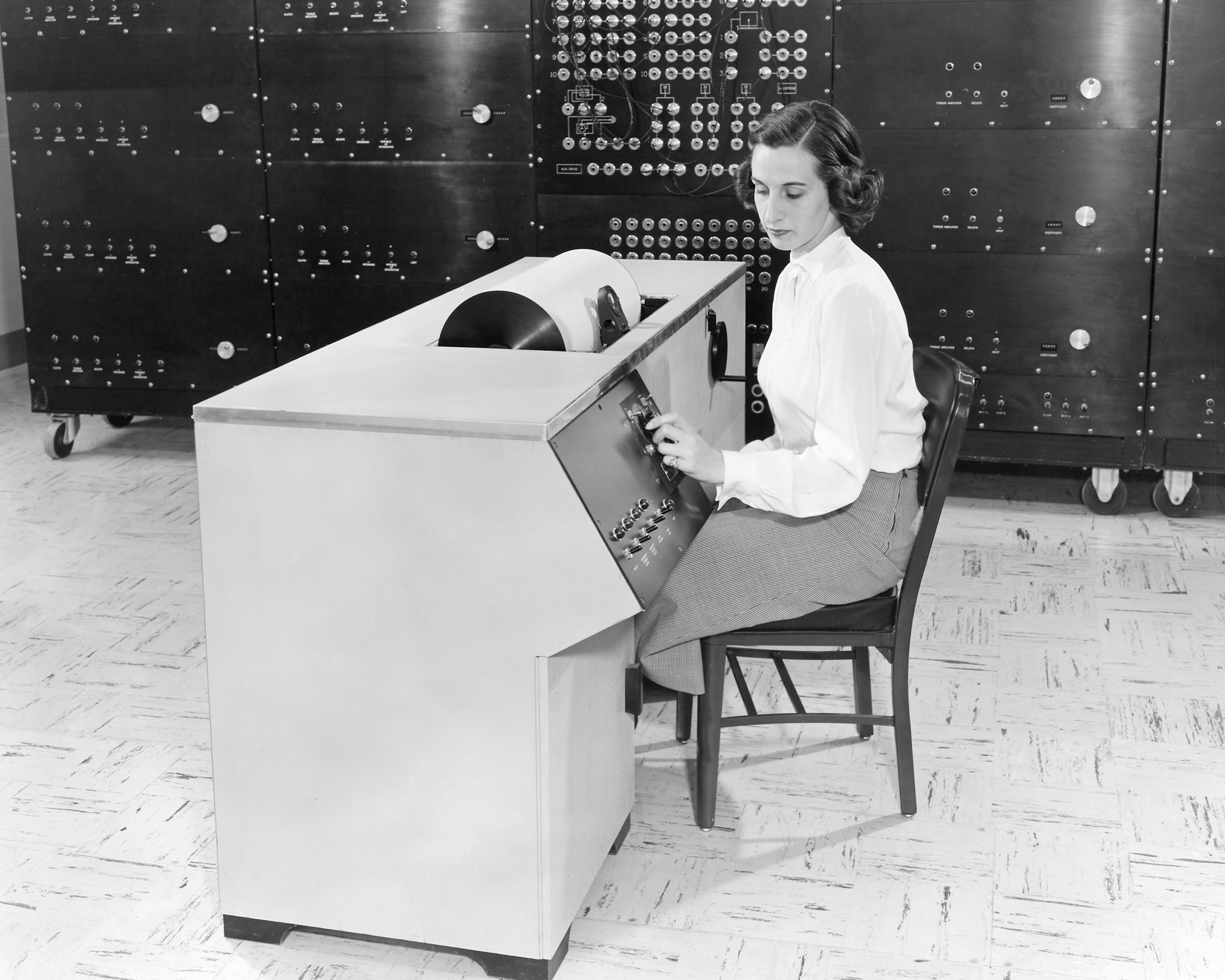
A differential analyser at the NACA Lewis Flight Propulsion Laboratory, 1951

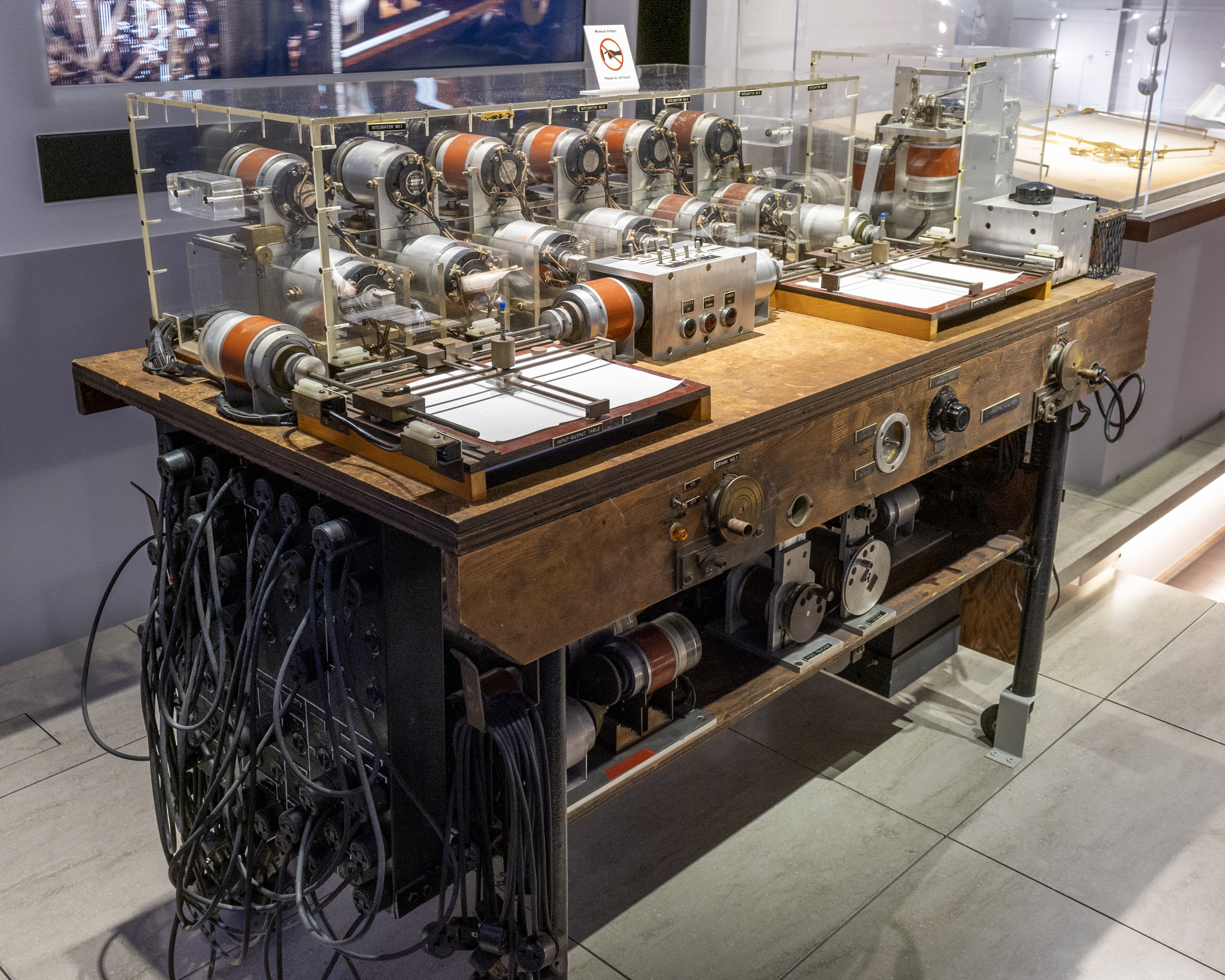
Differential analyser built by Arnold Nordsieck, at the Computer History Museum

Research on solutions for differential equations using mechanical devices, discounting planimeters, started at least as early as 1836, when the French physicist Gaspard-Gustave Coriolis designed a mechanical device to integrate differential equations of the first order.

The first description of a device which could integrate differential equations of any order was published in 1876 by James Thomson, who was born in Belfast in 1822, but lived in Scotland from the age of 10. Though Thomson called his device an "integrating machine", it is his description of the device, together with the additional publication in 1876 of two further descriptions by his younger brother, Lord Kelvin, which represents the invention of the differential analyser.

One of the earliest practical uses of Thomson's concepts was a tide-predicting machine built by Kelvin starting in 1872–3. On Lord Kelvin's advice, Thomson's integrating machine was later incorporated into a fire-control system for naval gunnery being developed by Arthur Pollen, resulting in an electrically driven, mechanical analogue computer, which was completed by about 1912. Italian mathematician Ernesto Pascal also developed integraphs for the mechanical integration of differential equations and published details in 1914.

However, the first widely practical general-purpose differential analyser was constructed by Harold Locke Hazen and Vannevar Bush at MIT, 1928–1931, comprising six mechanical integrators. In the same year, Bush described this machine in a journal article as a "continuous integraph". When he published a further article on the device in 1931, he called it a "differential analyzer". In this article, Bush stated that "[the] present device incorporates the same basic idea of interconnection of integrating units as did [Lord Kelvin's]. In detail, however, there is little resemblance to the earlier model." According to his 1970 autobiography, Bush was "unaware of Kelvin’s work until after the first differential analyzer was operational." Claude Shannon was hired as a research assistant in 1936 to run the differential analyser in Bush's lab.

Douglas Hartree of Manchester University brought Bush's design to England, where he constructed his first "proof of concept" model with his student, Arthur Porter, during 1934. As a result of this, the university acquired a full-scale machine incorporating four mechanical integrators in March 1935, which was built by Metropolitan-Vickers, and was, according to Hartree, "[the] first machine of its kind in operation outside the United States". During the next five years three more were added, at Cambridge University, Queen's University Belfast, and the Royal Aircraft Establishment in Farnborough. One of the integrators from this proof of concept is on display in the History of Computing section of the Science Museum in London, alongside a complete Manchester machine.

In Norway, the locally built Oslo Analyser was finished during 1938, based on the same principles as the MIT machine. This machine had 12 integrators, and was the largest analyser built for a period of four years.

In the United States, further differential analysers were built at the Ballistic Research Laboratory in Maryland and in the basement of the Moore School of Electrical Engineering at the University of Pennsylvania during the early 1940s. The latter was used extensively in the computation of artillery firing tables prior to the invention of the ENIAC, which, in many ways, was modelled on the differential analyser. Also in the early 1940s, with Samuel H. Caldwell, one of the initial contributors during the early 1930s, Bush attempted an electrical, rather than mechanical, variation, but the digital computer built elsewhere had much greater promise and the project ceased. In 1947, UCLA installed a differential analyser built for them by General Electric at a cost of $125,000. By 1950, this machine had been joined by three more. The UCLA differential analyser appeared in 1950's Destination Moon, and the same footage in 1951's When Worlds Collide, where it was called "DA". A different shot appears in 1956's Earth vs. the Flying Saucers.

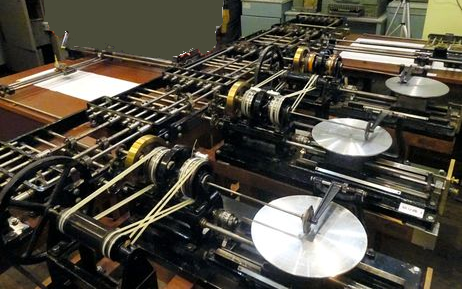
Early computer-and-plotter dating to 1944, solving complex equations again 70 years later

At Osaka Imperial University (present-day Osaka University) around 1944, a complete differential analyser machine was developed (illustrated) to calculate the movement of an object and other problems with mechanical components, and then draws graphs on paper with a pen. It was later transferred to the Tokyo University of Science and has been displayed at the school's Museum of Science in Shinjuku Ward. Restored in 2014, it is one of only two still operational differential analysers produced before the end of World War II.

In Canada, a differential analyser was constructed at the University of Toronto in 1948 by Beatrice Helen Worsley, but it appears to have had little or no use.

A differential analyser may have been used in the development of the bouncing bomb, used to attack German hydroelectric dams during World War II. Differential analysers have also been used in the calculation of soil erosion by river control authorities.

The differential analyser was eventually rendered obsolete by electronic analogue computers and, later, digital computers.

== Use of Meccano ==
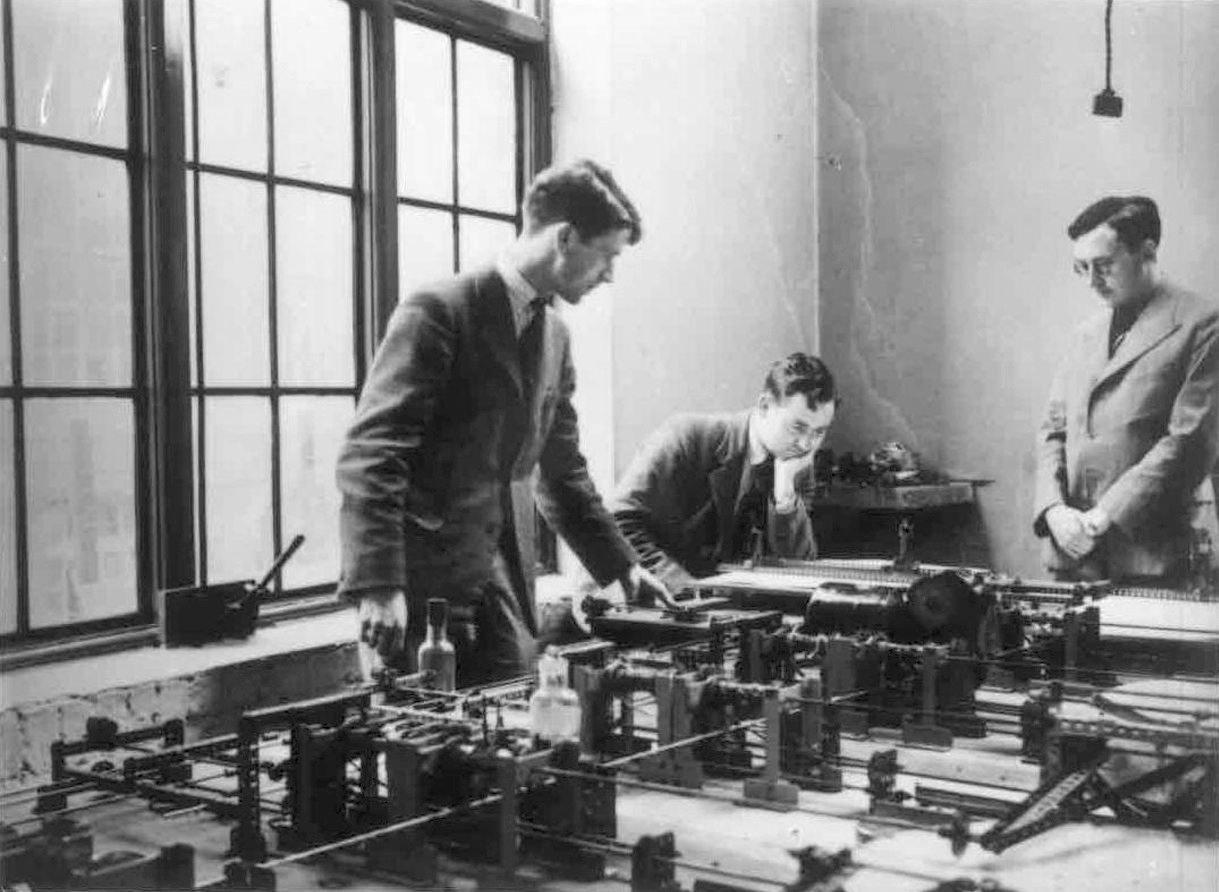
MOTAT's Meccano differential analyser in use at the Cambridge University Mathematics Laboratory, c. 1937. The person on the right is Dr Maurice Wilkes, who was in charge of it at the time.

The model differential analyser built at Manchester University in 1934 by Douglas Hartree and Arthur Porter made extensive use of Meccano parts: this meant that the machine was less costly to build, and it proved "accurate enough for the solution of many scientific problems". A similar machine built by J.B. Bratt at Cambridge University in 1935 is now in the Museum of Transport and Technology (MOTAT) collection in Auckland, New Zealand. A memorandum written for the British military's Armament Research Department in 1944 describes how this machine had been modified during World War II for improved reliability and enhanced capability, and identifies its wartime applications as including research on the flow of heat, explosive detonations, and simulations of transmission lines.

It has been estimated, by Garry Tee that "about 15 Meccano model Differential Analysers were built for serious work by scientists and researchers around the world".

== See also ==
- Torque amplifier
- Ball-and-disk integrator
- General purpose analog computer

== Bibliography ==
- Thomson, James (1876). "An Integrating Machine having a new Kinematic Principle". Proceedings of the Royal Society. 24 (164–170): 262–5. doi:10.1098/rspl.1875.0033.
- Thomson, William (1876). "Mechanical Integration of Linear Differential Equations of the Second Order with Variable Coefficients". Proceedings of the Royal Society. 24 (164–170): 269–71. doi:10.1098/rspl.1875.0035. S2CID 62694536.
- Thomson, William (1876). "Mechanical Integration of the general Linear Differential Equation of any Order with Variable Coefficients". Proceedings of the Royal Society. 24 (164–170): 271–5. doi:10.1098/rspl.1875.0036.
- Bush, Vannevar (1936). "Instrumental analysis". Bulletin of the American Mathematical Society. 42 (10): 649–69. doi:10.1090/S0002-9904-1936-06390-1.
- Hartree, D. R.; Porter, Porter (1934–1935), "The construction and operation of a model differential analyser", Memoirs and Proceedings of the Manchester Literary and Philosophical Society, 79: 51–73, reprinted as a pamphlet July 1935
- Worsley, Beatrice Helen (1947). A mathematical survey of computing devices with an appendix on an error analysis of differential analyzers (Master's Thesis, MIT).
- Crank, J. (1947). The Differential Analyser, London: Longmans, Green (this is the only book that describes how to set up and operate a mechanical differential analyser).
- MacNee, A.B. (1948). An electronic differential analyzer (RLE, Technical Report 90, MIT. Note that this paper describes a very early electronic analogue computer, not a mechanical differential analyser: it is included because the author clearly felt that the only way to introduce such an innovation was to describe it as an "electronic differential analyser").
