= Christiania Bryggeri =

Former Norwegian brewery in Oslo

- Company type: Aksjeselskap
- Industry: Brewing
- Founded: 1855
- Defunct: 1918
- Fate: Acquired by Schous Bryggeri; closed
- Headquarters: Oslo, Norway
- Products: Beer, malt, soft drinks

Christiania Bryggeri was a Norwegian brewery in Oslo, established in 1855 at Maridalsveien 3. With around 40 employees, it was by 1865 one of the largest breweries in the city, and it was here that the brothers Amund and Ellef Ringnes learned the brewing trade before founding Ringnes in 1876. The company became a joint-stock company in 1889, and by 1913 it was a large and modern brewery whose maltings supplied much of the country's breweries with malt.

Schous Bryggeri bought Christiania Bryggeri during the First World War, and as part of a restructuring of the Oslo brewing industry, brewing was consolidated at Schous, with the company closed in 1918. That year Schous moved its Nora soft-drink factory into the former brewery premises at Maridalsveien 3, where soft-drink production continued until 1971. The buildings later housed municipal offices and now hold the Oslo city archive.
