= Knud Ringnes =

Norwegian businessman (1875–1945)

Knud Maartmann Ringnes (14 April 1875 – 1945) was a Norwegian businessman.

He was born in Kristiania, the eldest son of Ellef Ringnes (1842–1929), brewery owner and benefactor, and his wife Kaja, née Maartmann (1851–1933). He was a nephew of Amund Ringnes and maternal grandson of Knud Geelmuyden Fleischer Maartmann, his namesake.

He graduated from Kristiania Technical School in 1896, and studied in England, the United States and at the University of Bonn from 1898 to 1899. He was hired in Ringnes Bryggeri in 1897, a brewery founded by his father and uncle. His uncle on the maternal side, Harald Sigvart Maartmann, took over the company in 1901, and Knud Ringnes became chief executive officer in 1921.

He chaired the organization Norwegian Brewers in Oslo from 1914 to 1918 and 1924 to 1929, and nationwide from 1919 to 1921. He was a board member of Federation of Norwegian Industries, the Norwegian Maritime Museum, Det Norske Travselskaps Landbane, Holmenkollen Turisthotel, Nora Fabrikker and Norges Handels- & Sjøfartstidende. He was a supervisory council member of Folketeatret (chair), Nationaltheatret, Forsikringsaktieselskabet Norden, Norske Liv and Christiania Bank og Kreditkasse. He was a member of Oslo city council from 1916 to 1919, council member of the Norwegian Geographical Society, chaired the committee for the conservation of the ship Fram. He was also a member of the gentlemen's club SK Fram (not related to the ship) since 1936.

He was decorated as a Knight, First Class of the Order of St. Olav. He was also rewarded crosses of the Austrian Order of Franz Joseph and the German Red Cross Decoration.
