= Axel Heiberg (disambiguation) =

Axel Heiberg (1848–1932) is a Norwegian diplomat, financier and patron.

Axel Heiberg may also refer to:

- Axel Heiberg (judge) (1908–1988), Norwegian judge

== Places ==
- Axel Heiberg Glacier, Antarctica
- Axel Heiberg Island, Canada
- Heiberg Islands, Russia
