= Knud Geelmuyden Fleischer Maartmann =

Norwegian politician

Knud Geelmuyden Fleischer Maartmann (1821–1888) was a Norwegian politician.

== Biografia ==
He was elected to the Parliament of Norway in 1865, representing the urban constituency of Flekkefjord. He worked as a merchant in the city. He was re-elected in 1868, and thus served two terms.

Together with Kirstine Solberg he had a daughter, Kaja Maartmann (1851–1933), who married Ellef Ringnes, brother of Amund Ringnes and founder of Ringnes Bryggeri. His son Harald Sigwart Maartmann (1855 - 1926) become the first director of Ringnes Bryggeri in 1901. He was the grandfather of Knud Maartmann Ringnes.
