= Grete Nash =

Norwegian ceramist

- Born: 14 February 1939; Oslo, Norway
- Died: 20 March 1999 (aged 60)
- Occupation: Ceramist
- Parent: Eigil Helland-Hansen
- Relatives: Bjørn Helland-Hansen (grandfather)
- Awards: Order of St. Olav

Grete Nash (née Helland-Hansen; 14 February 1939 – 20 March 1999) was a Norwegian ceramist.

She was born in Oslo to Eigil Helland-Hansen and Sophie Marie Eeg, and was a granddaughter of oceanographer Bjørn Helland-Hansen. She introduced the Japanese raku ware pottery tradition in Norway. Her wall plate Bysants from 1991 was acquired by the Storting, and she is represented in the National Museum of Art, Architecture and Design, the West Norway Museum of Decorative Art and Sørlandets Art Museum. She was decorated Knight, First Class of the Order of St. Olav in 1998.
