= Per Ivar Lied =

Norwegian politician (born 1970)

Per Ivar Lied (born 19 July 1970) is a Norwegian civil servant and politician for the Centre Party.

Born in Volda Municipality, his father was a farmer and his mother a school headmaster. Lied grew up in the village of Liabygda in Stranda Municipality. After finishing his secondary education in the village of Stranda in 1989, he underwent brief studies at Volda University College, Molde University College and Agder University College before taking the cand.polit. degree at the University of Oslo from 1994 to 1998. He moved on to the Ministry of Foreign Affairs trainee course.

Lied, who chaired the Centre Youth in Møre og Romsdal from 1989 to 1993 and later Møre og Romsdal Centre Party from 1995 to 1997, was elected as a member of the municipal council of Stranda Municipality from 1991 to 1995 and Møre og Romsdal county council from 1991 to 1998. He was elected as a deputy representative to the Parliament of Norway for Møre og Romsdal for the terms 1993–1997, 1997–2001 and 2021–2025.

Lied embarked on a diplomatic career, being stationed in Zagreb from 1999 and Geneva from 2002 to 2005. Following a period when he served at the Ministry of Foreign Affairs in Oslo, he was stationed as embassy councillor in Warsaw from 2011 to 2013. Lied then quit the foreign service in 2013 to become chief administrative officer of two municipalities, Stranda Municipality and Stordal Municipality, in 2013. In 2016 he moved on to Ørsta Municipality. He also re-entered politics. In 2015 he was elected to the municipal council of Ørsta Municipality, and in 2019 both to Ørsta municipal council and Møre og Romsdal county council.
