= Amund Ringnes =

Amund Ringnes may refer to:

- Amund Ringnes Island
- Amund Ringnes (brewery owner, 1840)
- Amund Ringnes (brewery owner, 1905)
