= Tou (brewery) =

Norwegian brewery

Tou (Tou bryggeri) was a brewery established in 1855 at Tau near Stavanger, Norway.

Tou brewery started producing beer and flour in 1855 at Tau outside Stavanger. In 1901, the production of beer was moved to Lervik in Stavanger. In the 1970s, the production was again moved to new facilities in Forus. In 1964, Christianssands Bryggeri (CB) in Kristiansand became a subsidiary of Tou. But CB was in 1990 demerged into a separate company which subsequently in 1999 was acquired by Hansa Borg. Tou merged in 1990 with Nora Industrier and became part of beverage company Ringnes. In June 2003, the board of Ringnes decided to close down the brewery, despite strong local protests. The last bottle rolled off the assembly line on 15 August 2003, and the production was moved to Oslo, where beer branded "Tou" is still being produced.

Tou brewery was Norway's first producer of carbonated apple juice.
