= Amund Ringnes (brewery owner, 1905) =

Norwegian businessman and brewer

Amund Ringnes (24 June 1905 – 1980) was a Norwegian brewery owner.

He was born in Oslo to Andreas Ringnes (1874–1928) and Ragna Jensen (1876–1944). He was the grandson of brewery owner and patron Amund Ringnes (1840–1907). He married Laura Kristine Falkenberg in 1928.

He started studying chemistry in 1923, and graduated in chemical engineering from the Norwegian Institute of Technology in 1927. He took training as a brewery master in Copenhagen, finished in 1929 and was employed by Ringnes brewery in the same year. After a period as a chemist, he became a manager in 1935 and chief executive officer in 1945. He was also a member of the board.

He chaired the employers' association Bryggerienes Arbeidsgiverforening from 1952 to 1957, was a central board member of the Norwegian Employers' Confederation 1952 to 1957 and the Federation of Norwegian Industries from 1957 to 1961. He was a board member of Nora Fabrikker since 1945, Vel-Vask from 1946 to 1956, Tønsberg Bryggeri since 1962, Farris since 1963, Christiania Bank og Kreditkasse since 1969 (formerly a supervisory council member) and Forsikringsaktieselskabet Norden since 1957 (chair since 1968, formerly a supervisory council member from 1945 to 1957). He was a member of the Norway Travel Association, and in science, he was a member of the European Brewery Convention from 1947, and of the NTNF council from 1955 to 1963. He was decorated as a Knight of the Order of the Dannebrog.
