= Raufoss Church =

Church in Innlandet, Norway

- Raufoss kirke
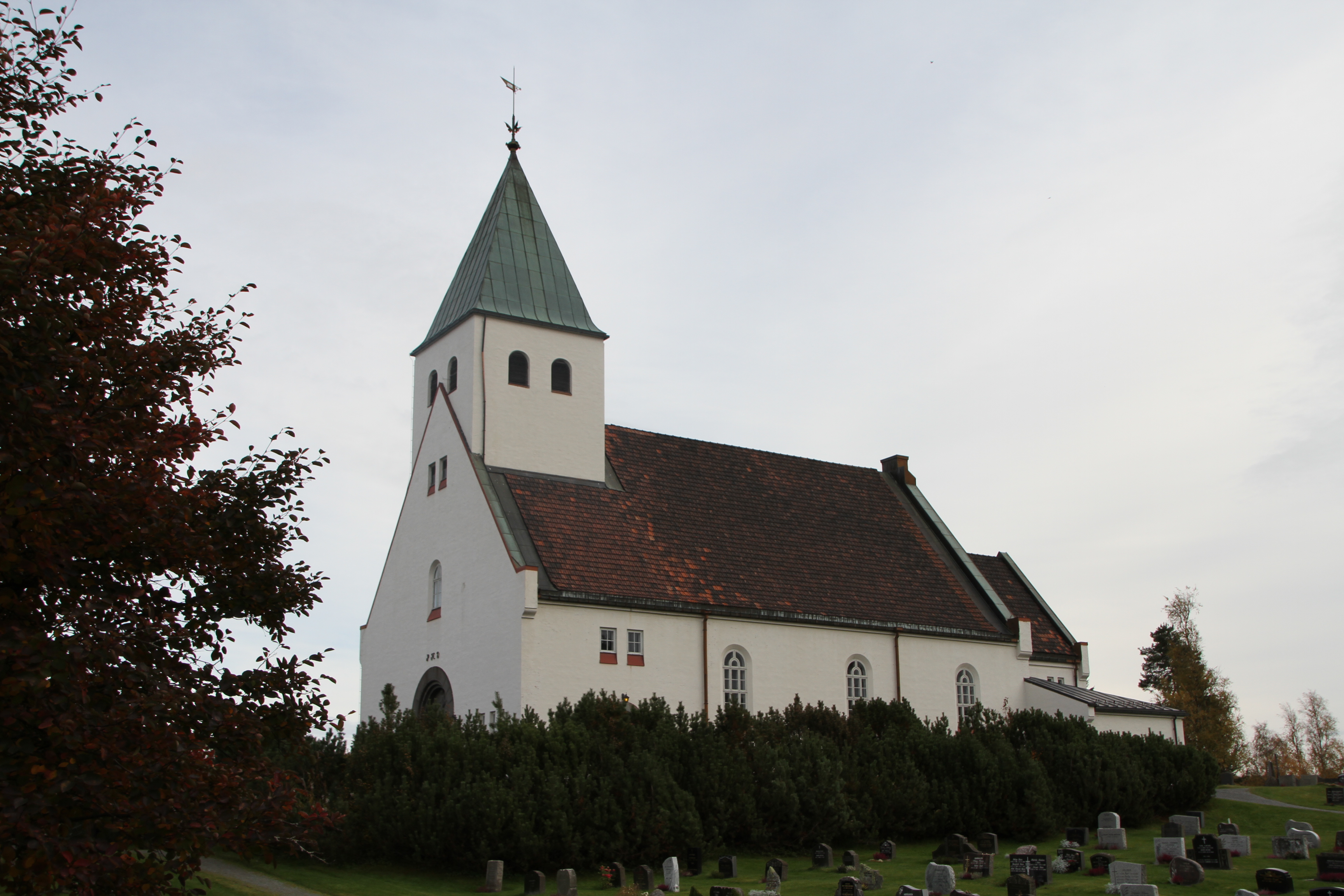
- View of the church
- Raufoss Church
- 60°43′29″N 10°36′40″E
- Location: Vestre Toten, Innlandet
- Country: Norway
- Denomination: Church of Norway
- Churchmanship: Evangelical Lutheran

History
- Status: Parish church
- Founded: 1939
- Consecrated: 11 June 1939

Architecture
- Functional status: Active
- Architect: Henry Bucher
- Architectural type: Long church
- Groundbreaking: 16 October 1937
- Completed: 1939 (87 years ago)

Specifications
- Capacity: 450
- Materials: Stone

Administration
- Diocese: Hamar bispedømme
- Deanery: Toten prosti
- Parish: Raufoss
- Norwegian Cultural Heritage Site
- Type: Church
- Status: Not protected
- ID: 85275

Raufoss Church (Norwegian: Raufoss kirke) is a parish church of the Church of Norway in Vestre Toten Municipality in Innlandet county, Norway. It is located in the town of Raufoss. It is the church for the Raufoss parish which is part of the Toten prosti (deanery) in the Diocese of Hamar. The white, stone church was built in a long church design in 1939 using plans drawn up by the architect Henry Bucher. The church seats about 450 people.

== History ==
The village of Raufoss grew up during the 19th century around some large industries. A cemetery was consecrated in Raufoss on 5 February 1897. A year later, a small burial chapel was built, just behind where the church now stands. It was a 6-by-8-metre (20 ft × 26 ft) building with a 12-metre (39 ft) high tower. It had no seating, and it is said that there was barely room for the coffin and the next of kin to be indoors. During funerals, the doors were left open so others could stand outside. When Ås Church was struck by lightning and burned in 1915, demands were made by the people in Raufoss for their own church in their growing village. Times were difficult, however, and it was not until 1930 that a church committee was appointed. The church was designed by Henry Bucher and final approval was granted in 1932. However, it took four more years before the municipality's financing plan was approved. so construction did not start for a while. The builder Ingvar Dybdahl was responsible for the construction. Domenico Erdmann was a consultant for the interior decoration and color scheme. The foundation stone was laid on 16 October 1937, and the church was consecrated on 11 June 1939 by Bishop Henrik Hille. The old burial chapel was demolished after the new church was completed.

== Media gallery ==
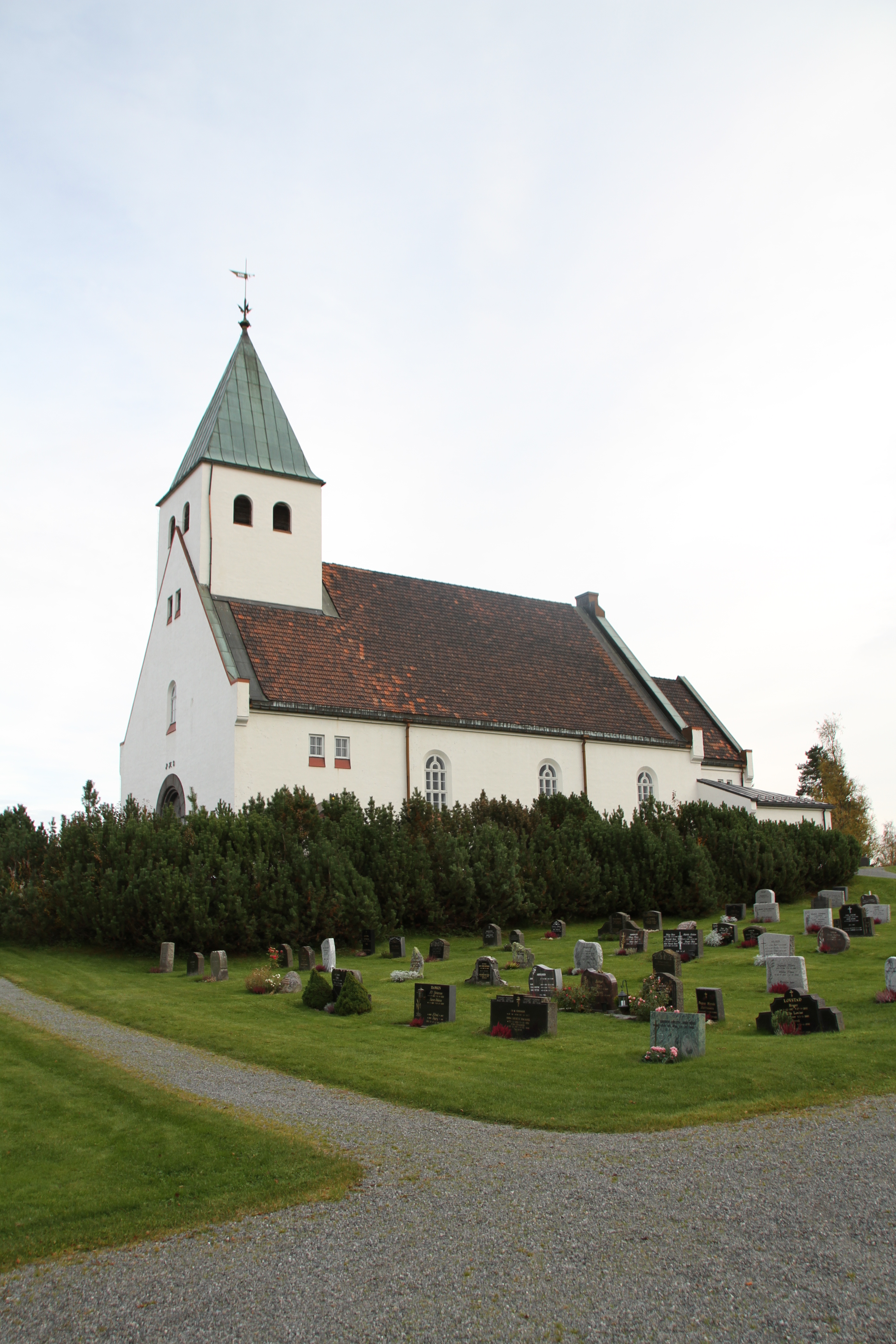

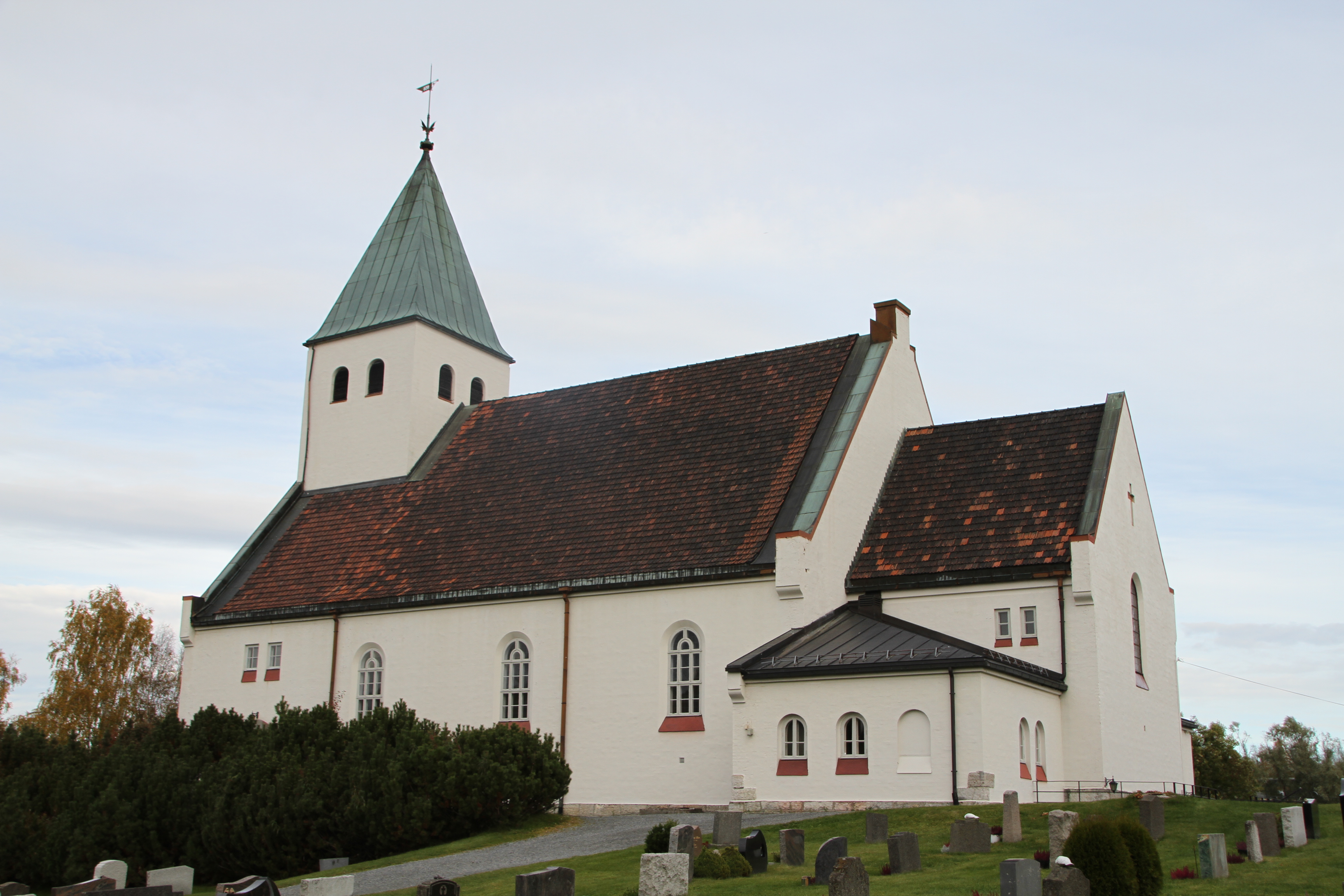

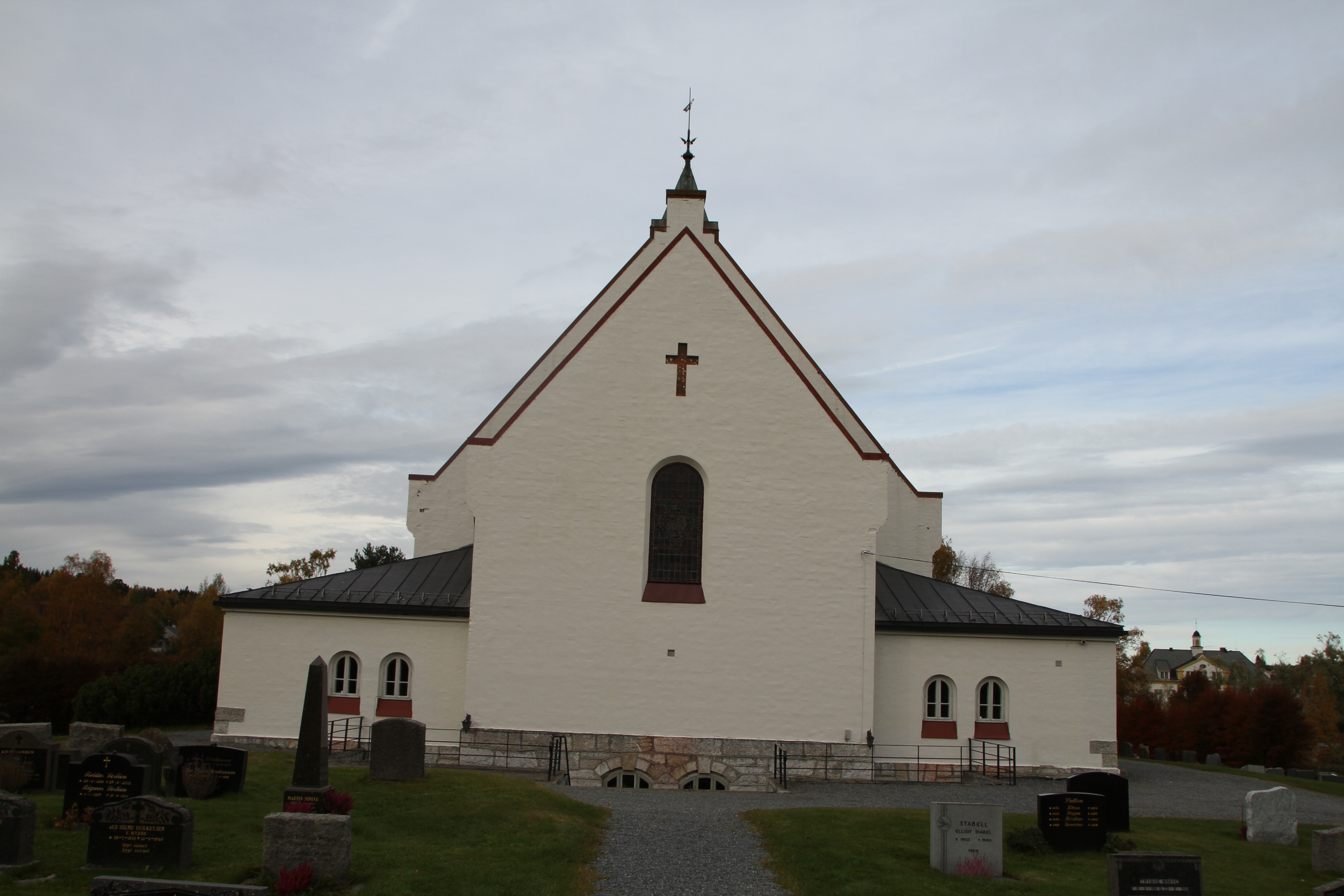

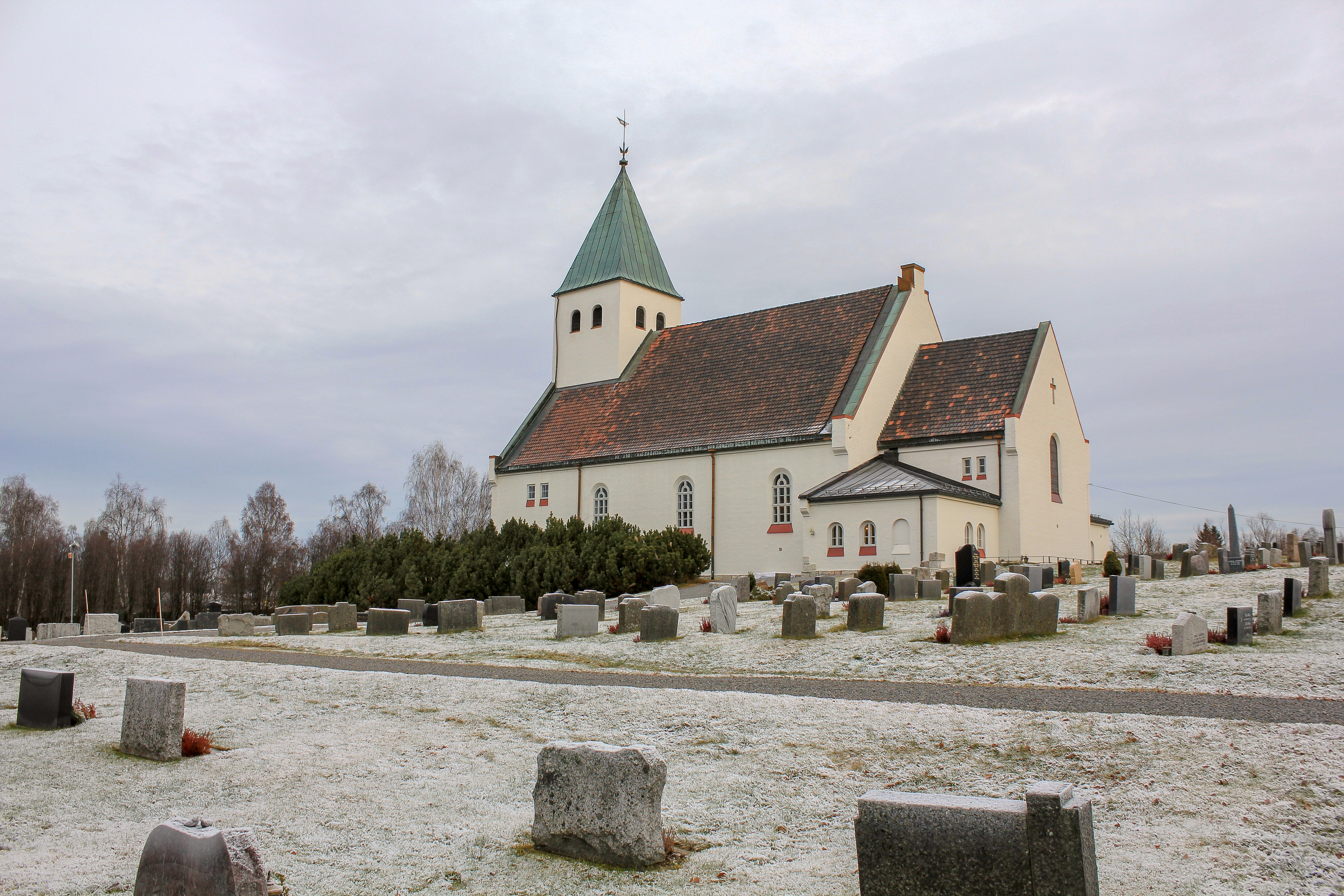

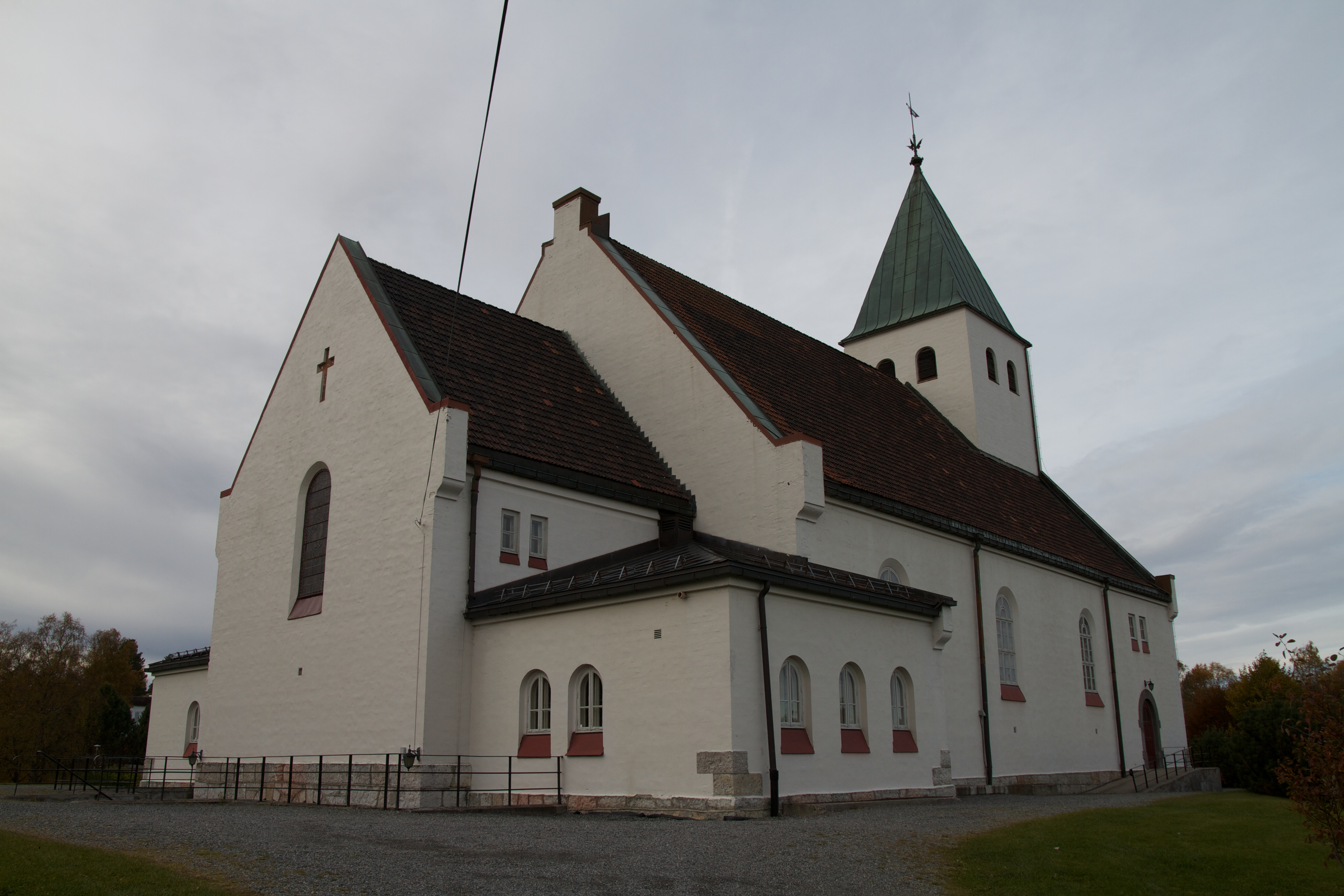

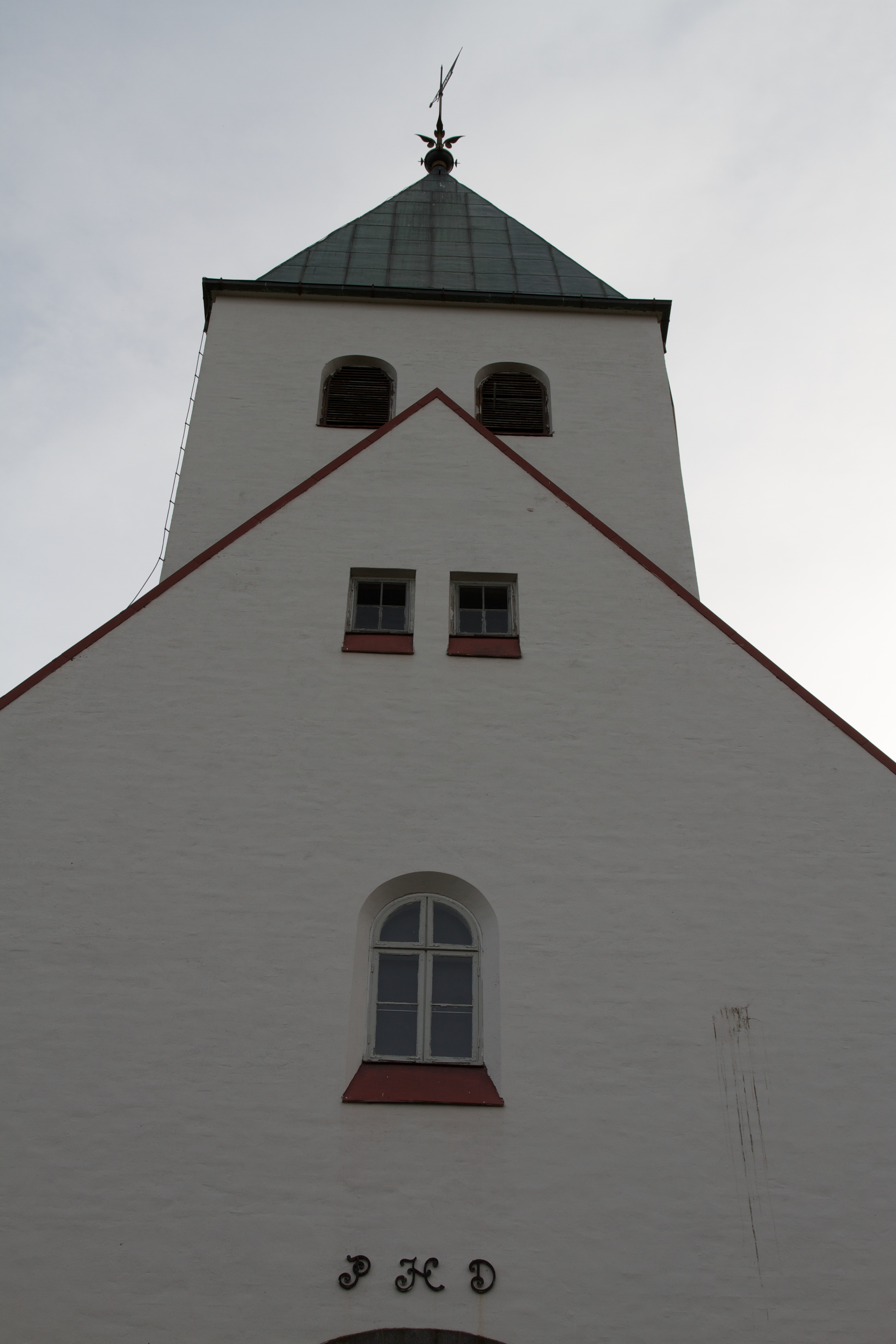

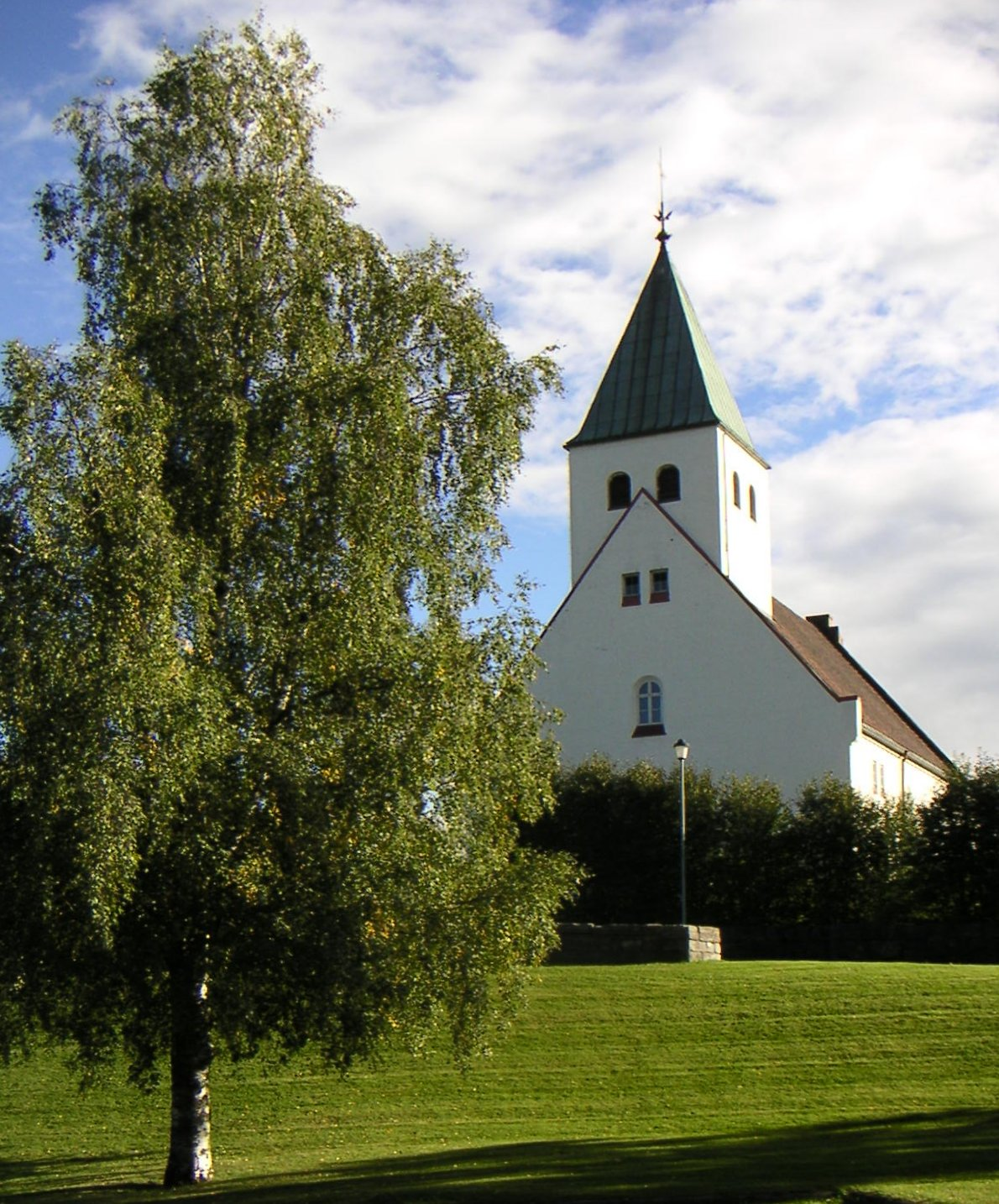

== See also ==
- List of churches in Hamar
