= Christiania Actie-Ølbryggeri =

Former Norwegian brewery in Oslo

- Formerly: Aktiebryggeriet i Oslo
- Company type: Aksjeselskap
- Industry: Brewing
- Founded: 1875
- Defunct: 1939
- Fate: Closed under industry quota agreement
- Headquarters: Oslo, Norway
- Products: Beer, soft drinks

Christiania Actie-Ølbryggeri was a brewery established in Christiania (Oslo) in 1875, which around 1900 was one of the city's largest breweries. It also produced soft drinks. Planned by a German brewing expert and gradually expanded, the plant covered over 30,000 square meters by 1913, with a storage capacity of more than two million liters.

In 1925 the brewery changed its name to Aktiebryggeriet i Oslo. The 1920s were marked by falling sales and strong competition among Oslo's largest breweries, and in 1930 they agreed to replace price wars with price cooperation and quota-sharing. As part of the agreement, Aktiebryggeriet was to be closed and its customers and production volume divided among the three remaining breweries, Ringnes, Schous, and Frydenlund. The brewery in Åkebergveien was closed and in 1934 taken into use as a new section of the Oslo penitentiary, "Botsen," soon nicknamed "Bayer'n."

== Bibliography ==
- Killengreen, Chr. P. (1926). Den Norske bryggeriforening: Jubilæumsskrift i anledning foreningens 25 aars bestaaen, 18de november 1901 – 18de november 1926. Centraltrykkeriet.
