= Kapp Church =

Church in Innlandet, Norway

- Kapp kirke
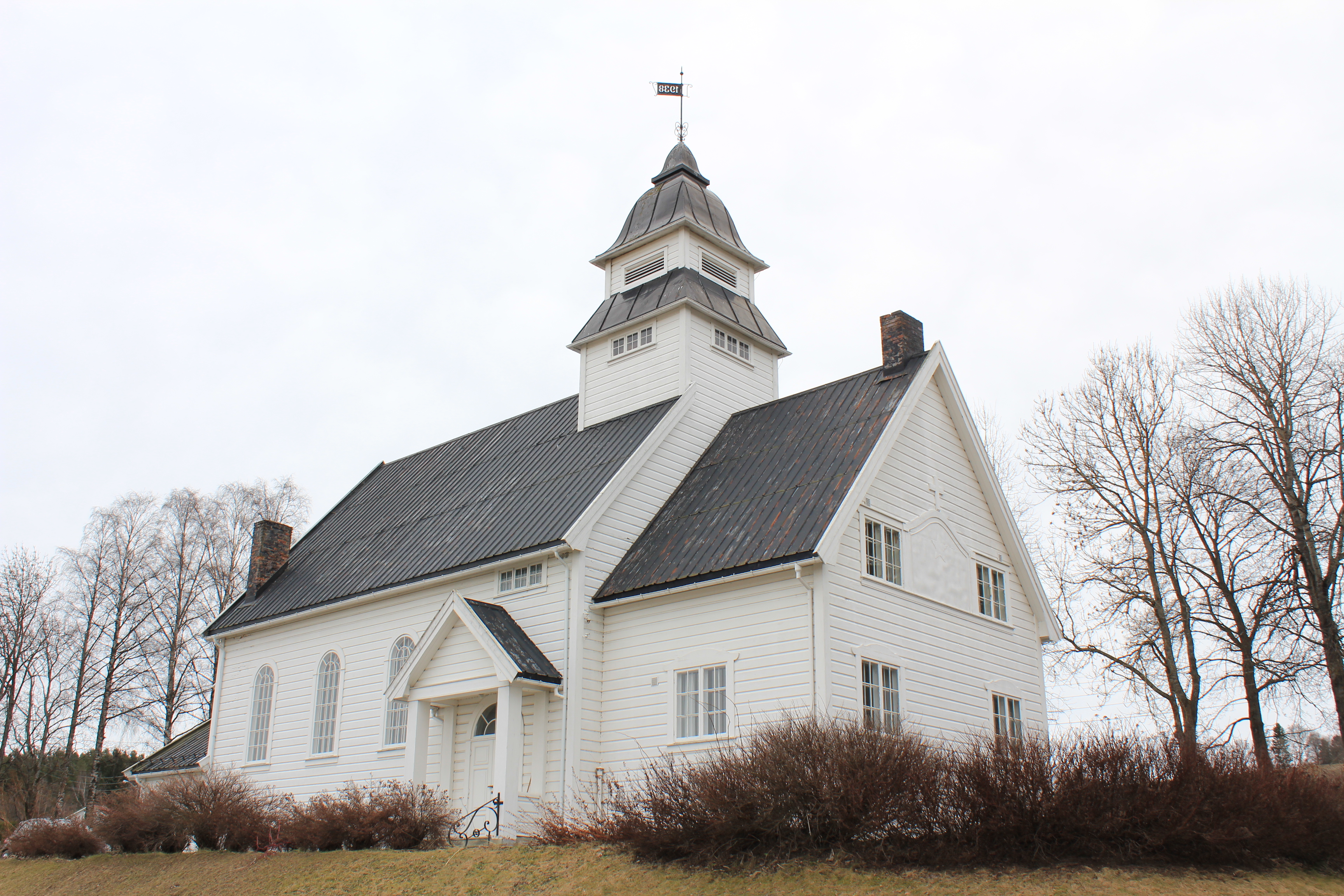
- View of the church
- Kapp Church
- 60°42′35″N 10°51′45″E
- Location: Østre Toten, Innlandet
- Country: Norway
- Denomination: Church of Norway
- Churchmanship: Evangelical Lutheran

History
- Status: Parish church
- Founded: 1939
- Consecrated: 14 May 1939

Architecture
- Functional status: Active
- Architect: Henry Bucher
- Architectural type: Long church
- Completed: 1939 (87 years ago)

Specifications
- Capacity: 167
- Materials: Wood

Administration
- Diocese: Hamar bispedømme
- Deanery: Toten prosti
- Parish: Kapp
- Norwegian Cultural Heritage Site
- Type: Church
- Status: Not protected
- ID: 84760

Kapp Church (Norwegian: Kapp kirke) is a parish church of the Church of Norway in Østre Toten Municipality in Innlandet county, Norway. It is located in the village of Kapp. It is the church for the Kapp parish which is part of the Toten prosti (deanery) in the Diocese of Hamar. The white, wooden church was built in a long church design in 1939 using plans drawn up by the architect Henry Bucher. The church seats about 167 people.

== History ==
Planning for a new church in Kapp began during the 1930s. Henry Bucher was hired to design the new church. Construction began in the spring of 1937, led by carpenter Karl Johnsen Kjæsarud. Johan Mortensen performed the plumbing work, Asbjørn Moe did painting work, and Per Johnsen was responsible for electrical installations. The new building was consecrated on 14 May 1939. The church has a rectangular nave and a narrower chancel surrounded by sacristies to the north and south. There is a tower on the roof at the west end of the nave. Originally, it was an annex chapel and more recently it was upgraded to become a parish church.

== Media gallery ==
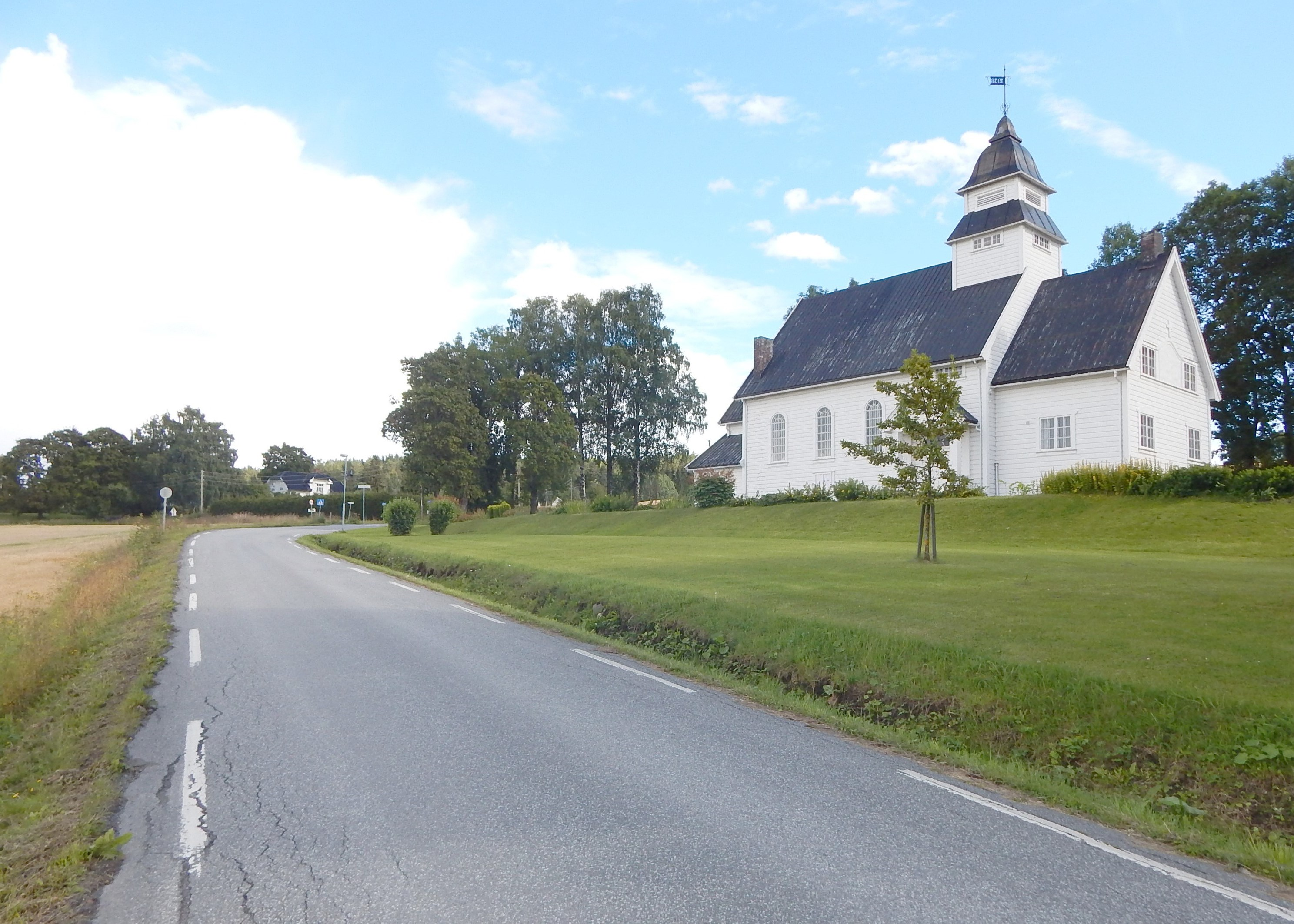

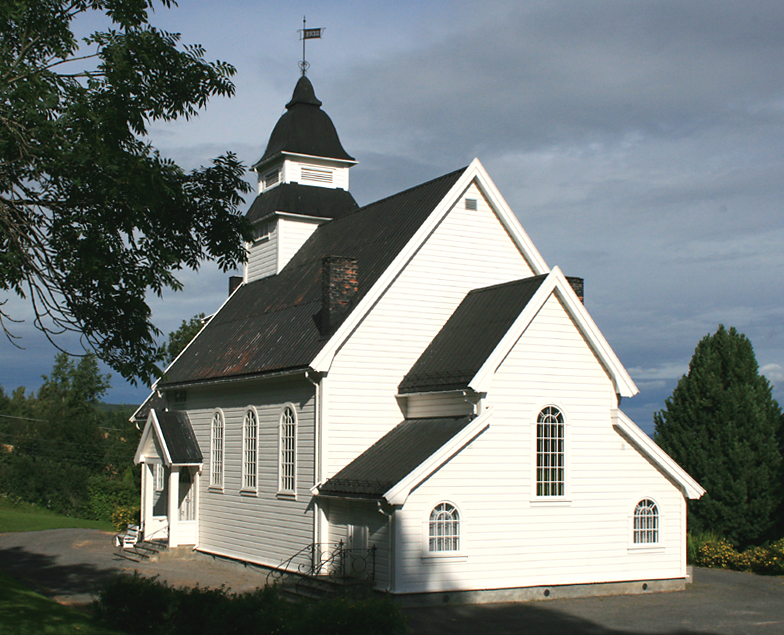

== See also ==
- List of churches in Hamar
