= Ellef Ringnes =

Norwegian brewer and patron

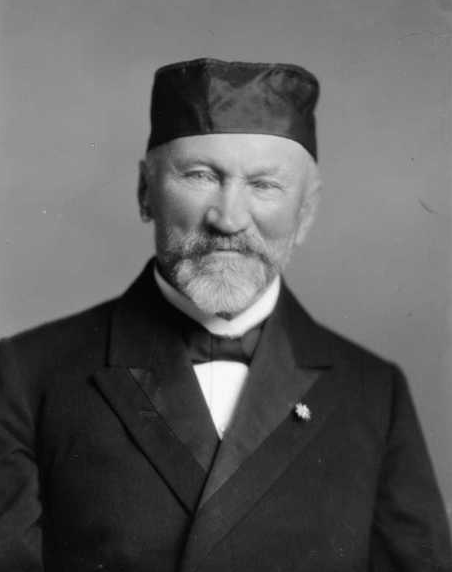
Ellef Ringnes in 1920

Ellef Ringnes (25 October 1842 – 15 March 1929) was a Norwegian brewer and patron.

He was born at the Ringnes farm in Krødsherad, Buskerud to farmer Anders Knudsen Ringnes (1813–75) and his wife Maren Amundsdatter (1815–76). His father left the farm in 1855, and Ellef was employed as travelling salesman for Christiania Bryggeri at the age of 18. In 1876, he founded Ringnes & Compani brewery with his brother Amund Ringnes and the businessman Axel Heiberg. It was the eighth brewery in Christiania (now Oslo), and later had its name changed to Ringnes Bryggeri.

The Ringnes brewery became successful, and Ellef Ringnes and his brother became patrons in Christiania. They invested in the construction of the Holmenkollen Line and sanatoriums in the Holmenkollen area. From 1896 to 1906, Ellef Ringnes was a member of the board of the Holmenkolbanen light rail company, which built and operated the Holmenkollen Line. Ellef and Amund Ringnes sponsored Fridtjof Nansen's Fram expedition, which they in a short period of time led together with businessman Axel Heiberg and shipowner Thomas Fearnley. They also sponsored explorer Otto Sverdrup's 1898–1902 Fram expedition; as a compensation Sverdrup named two discovered islands after them: Ellef Ringnes Island and Amund Ringnes Island.

On 30 June 1869, Ringnes married Karen Tonette ("Kaja") Maartmann (1851–1933) with whom he had 14 children. His father-in-law was Knud Geelmuyden Fleischer Maartmann. In 1896, Ringnes became a member of the Norwegian Academy of Science and Letters. In the same year, he bought Ringnes farm from his brother Amund, who earlier had inherited it from his father. Many parties were arranged at the farm house, to which both royal personages and prominent society members were invited. His residence at St. Hanshaugen Park, dubbed "Cairo" and "Ringnes Castle", was likewise the scene of many parties in his lifetime. In 1901, Ringnes was succeeded by his brother-in-law Harald Sigvart Maartmann as managing director of Ringnes brewery. Maartman was in turn succeeded by his son Knud Maartmann Ringnes (1875–1945) in 1920.

Ringnes was decorated as Knight, First Class of the Royal Norwegian Order of St. Olav in 1896, and upgraded to Commander of the First Class in 1908. He was also a Commander of the Legion of Honour. Ringnes was an honorary member of the Norwegian, Danish, and Swedish brewery associations. In 1930, a bust of him was erected at Holmenkollen. Ringnes died in Oslo on 15 March 1929, aged 86.
