= E. C. Dahls Brewery =

Brewery in Norway

Coordinates: 63°26′27″N 10°25′40″E

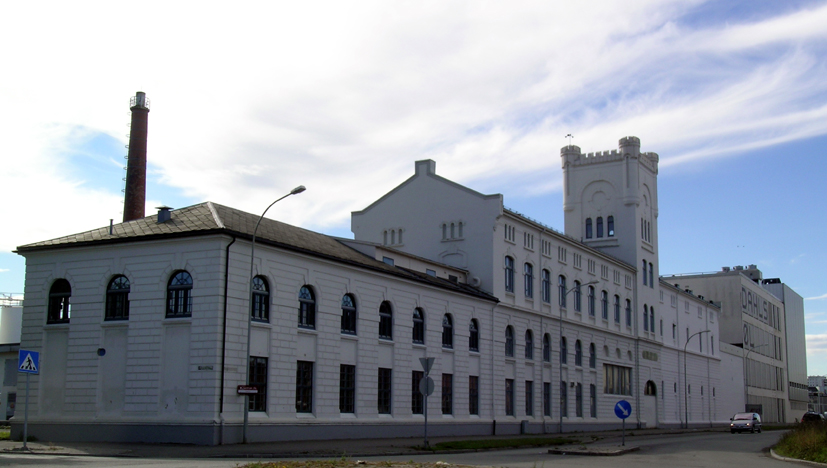
E. C. Dahls Brewery

E.C. Dahls Brewery (E.C. Dahls Bryggeri) is a brewery and soft drink factory based in Trondheim, Norway.

== History ==
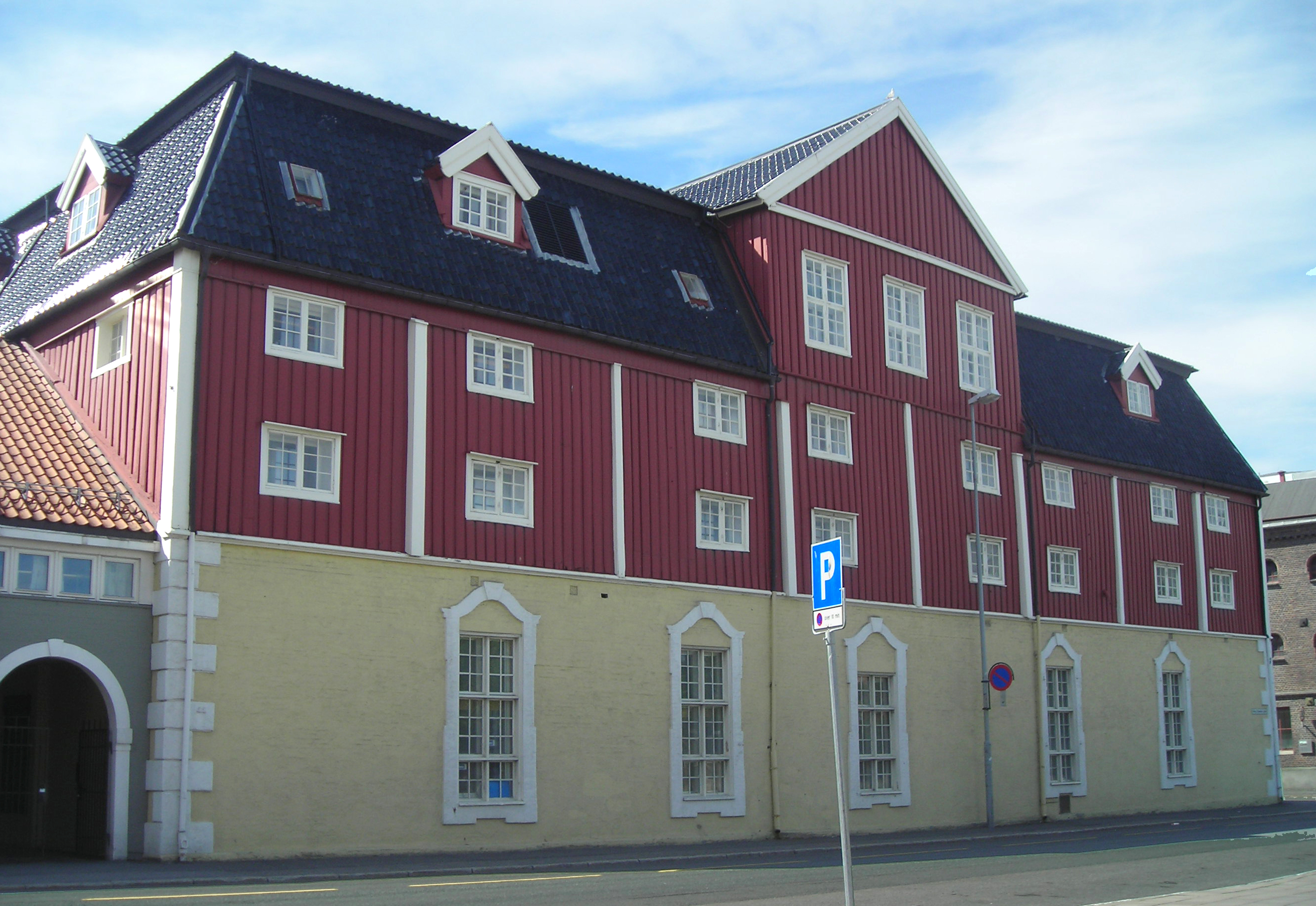
Sukkerhuset in Trondheim

E.C. Dahls Brewery was founded in 1856 by Erich Christian Dahl (1814–1882), a local businessman and consul-general from Trondheim. He was the son of Erich Dahl (1774-1821) Christine Lyche (1776-1861). His parents had been the owners of an import-export business and shipping company. In 1851, Erich Christian Dahl had bought the Sugarhouse (Sukkerhuset) in the Kalvskinnet area of Trondheim, where there had been a sugar refinery since 1754. Sukkerhuset was rebuilt for brewing. The brewery stayed in the building until 1984.

The first bottle of Bayerøl, a Munich-style dunkel, was sold in 1857. In 1910, the plant began to produce soft drinks at the brewery as well. Bayerøl was the most important type of beer until the early 20th century when Dahls Pils, a pilsener took over as the most popular beer.

In 1966, it was merged with Trondheim Aktie Brewery (Trondhjems Aktiebryggeri), which was founded in 1899 and Trondheim Brewery (Trondhjems Bryggeri) which dated to 1919. E.C. Dahls Bryggeri is now owned by Ringnes, part of the Group Carlsberg AS.

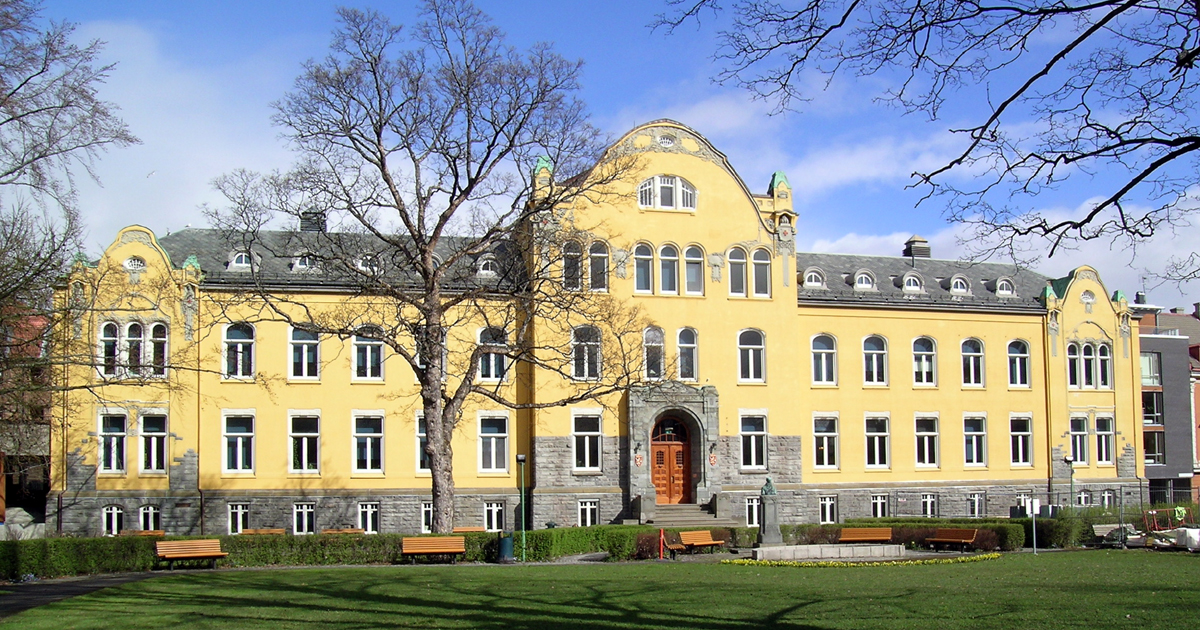
E.C. Dahl's Foundation

== E.C. Dahl's Foundation ==
E.C. Dahl's Foundation (E.C. Dahls Stiftelse i Trondheim) was opened in Trondheim during 1908 with funding from the estate of Erich Christian Dahl. The Foundation originally established a hospital for newborn children and infant care. The Foundation now provides support in relation to different types of disabilities. The Foundation's Art Nouveau building in the Kalvskinnet area of Trondheim is now used by the Trøndelag Art Center (Trøndelag Kunstnersenter) .

== See also ==
- Beer in Norway
