= Liabygda Church =

Church in Møre og Romsdal, Norway

- Liabygda kyrkje
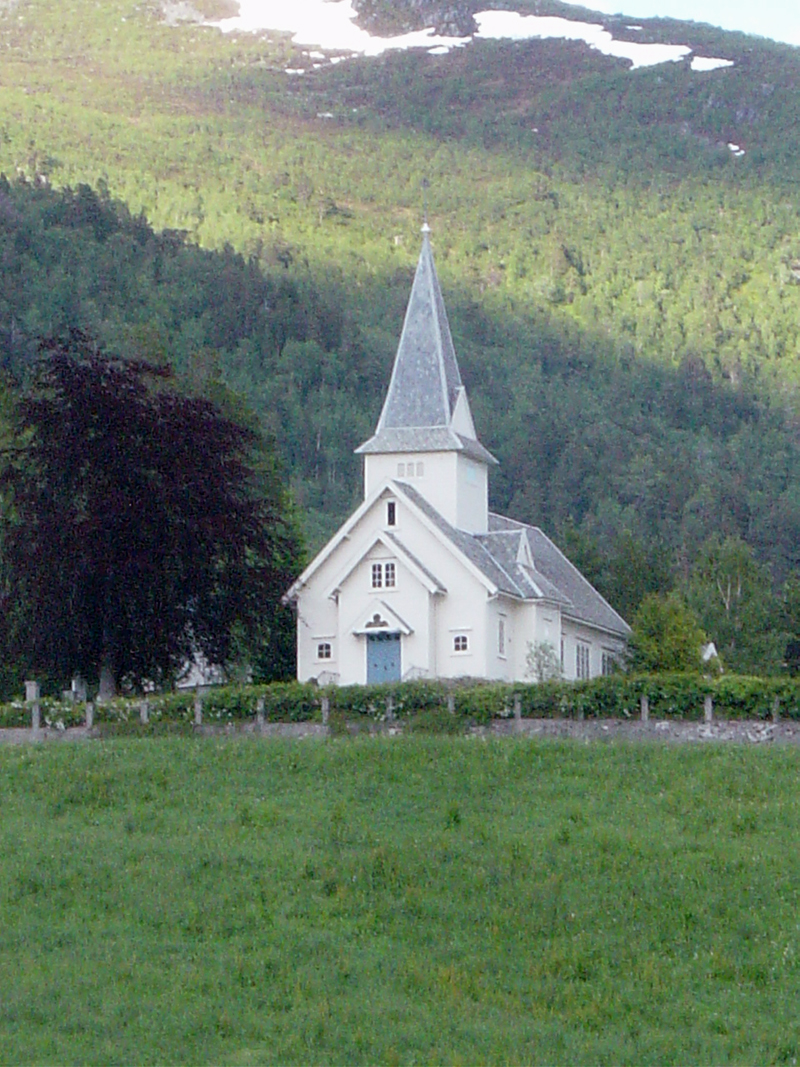
- View of the church
- Liabygda Church
- 62°18′42″N 7°03′59″E
- Location: Stranda Municipality, Møre og Romsdal
- Country: Norway
- Denomination: Church of Norway
- Churchmanship: Evangelical Lutheran

History
- Status: Parish church
- Founded: 1908
- Consecrated: 15 August 1917

Architecture
- Functional status: Active
- Architect: Hans Bucher
- Architectural type: Long church
- Completed: 1917 (109 years ago)

Specifications
- Capacity: 165
- Materials: Wood

Administration
- Diocese: Møre bispedømme
- Deanery: Nordre Sunnmøre prosti
- Parish: Liabygda
- Norwegian Cultural Heritage Site
- Type: Church
- Status: Not protected
- ID: 84299

Liabygda Church (Norwegian: Liabygda kyrkje) is a parish church of the Church of Norway in Stranda Municipality in Møre og Romsdal county, Norway. It is located in the village of Liabygda, on the northern shore of the Norddalsfjorden. It is the church for the Liabygda parish which is part of the Nordre Sunnmøre prosti (deanery) in the Diocese of Møre. The white, wooden church was built in a long church design in 1917 using plans drawn up by the architect Hans Bucher. The church seats about 165 people.

== History ==
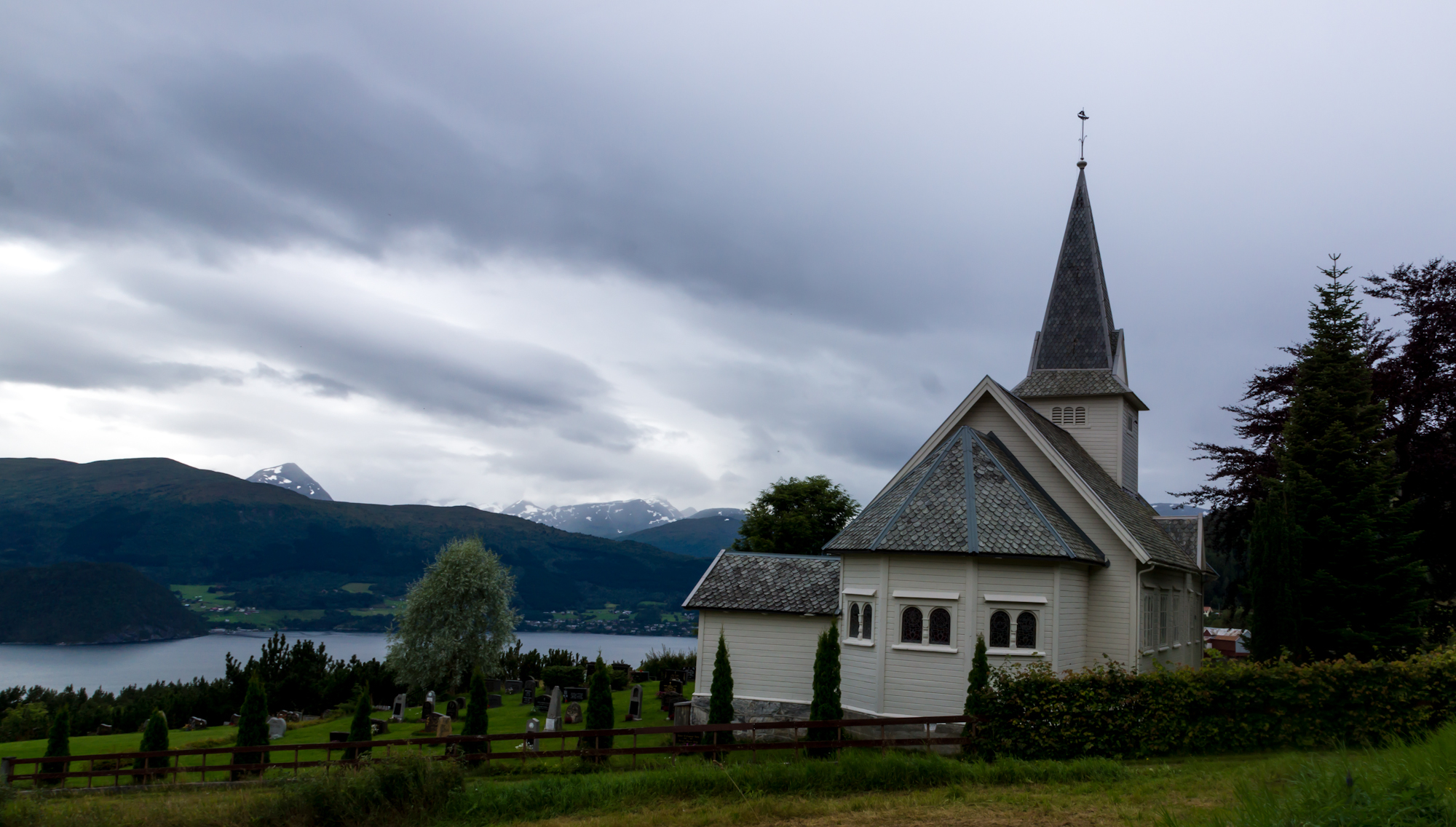
View of the church

In 1908, the people of Liabygda were given permission to build a small prayer house in the village to be used on certain occasions since their local parish church, Stranda Church was located on the other side of the fjord, making it much more difficult to reach. Soon after its construction, it was expanded to make it more like a chapel. In 1914, permission was granted to build a larger chapel. Drawings were prepared by Henry Bucher and Tore Overå was the lead builder. The old building was torn down, and the new chapel was constructed in 1917. The building was consecrated on 15 August 1917. The building was restored and enlarged in 1989-1990. Around the same time, the chapel was upgraded to the status of a full parish church.

== See also ==
- List of churches in Møre
