= Henry Bucher =

Norwegian architect

Henry Bertram Bucher
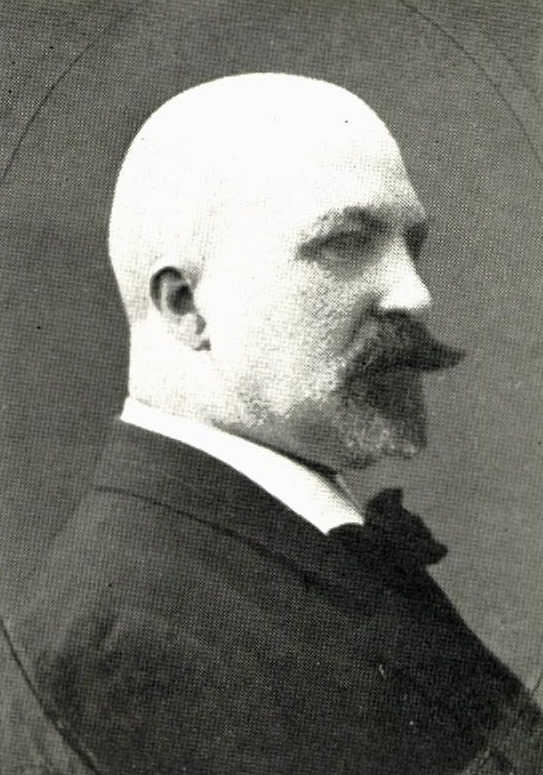
- Born: February 9, 1864; Christiania, Norway
- Died: October 29, 1944 (aged 80); Oslo, Norway
- Occupation: Architect

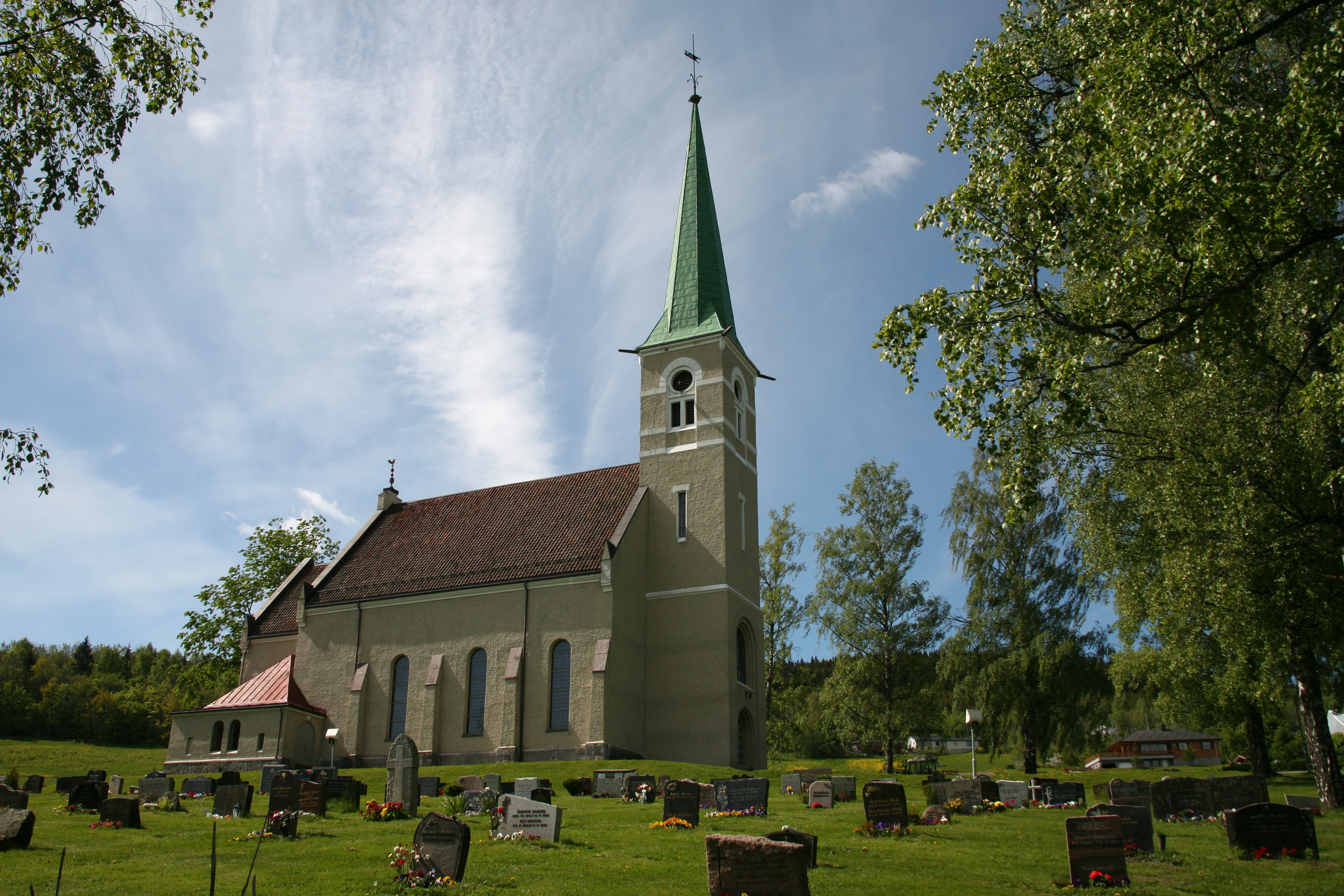
Sjåstad Church in Lier

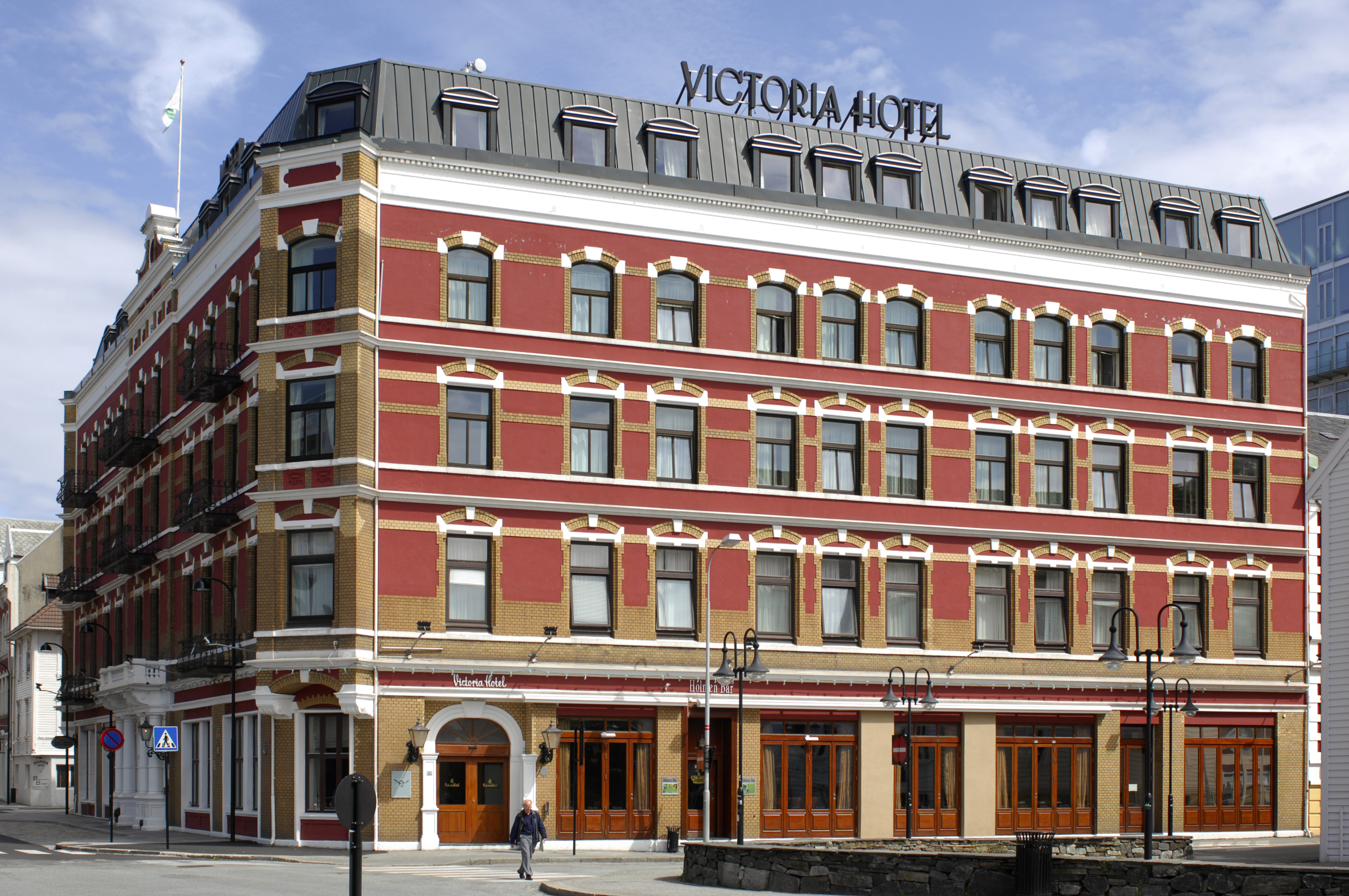
Victoria Hotel, Stavanger

Henry Bertram Bucher (February 9, 1864 – October 29, 1944) was a Norwegian architect.

After studying under Ludvig Haslund and August Tidemand, Bucher studied at the Norwegian National Academy of Craft and Art Industry in Christiania and then at the Technische Hochschule in Charlottenburg (now Technische Universität Berlin).

He established a practice in Christiania in 1887 and designed a number of residential buildings there, especially on the west side, as well as detached homes in the neighboring Aker Municipality. He also did work in Stavanger, Bergen, Fredrikstad, and Voss, and created a number of churches. He designed the West Norway Museum of Decorative Art in the Renaissance Revival style. His buildings often have a monumental character and draw inspiration from various styles (historicism). Like many architects, he also designed his own home, which he named Primavera.

== Selected works ==
- Huitfeldt Street (Huitfeldts gate) 14–16B, Oslo Municipality (1887)
- Riddervold Street (Riddervolds gate) 2, Oslo (1889–1890)
- Huitfeldt Street (Huitfeldts gate) 33, Oslo (1890)
- Permanenten, Bergen Municipality (1891)
- Hammerfest Church, Hammerfest Municipality (1891, burned in 1944)
- Sjåstad Church, Lier Municipality (1896)
- Gymnasium (Turnhallen), St. Olaf Street (St. Olavs gate) 25, Oslo (1897–1890; interior destroyed by fire in 1988, but facade preserved)
- Victoria Hotel, Stavanger Municipality (1900)
- Pleym Courtyard (Pleymgården), Aker Street (Akersgata) 11, Oslo (1906)
- National Archives magazine annex (now part of the National Museum of Art, Architecture and Design), Bank Square (Bankplassen) 3, Oslo (1911)
- Fredrikstad Customs House, Fredrikstad Municipality (1914–1915)
- Liabygda Church, Stranda Municipality (1917)
- Vodd High School (Voss landsgymnas), Voss Municipality (1920)
- Ås Church, Vestre Toten Municipality (1921)
- Rail Toll Station (Jernbanetollstasjonen), Schweigaard Street (Schweigaards gate) 15, Oslo (1919−1923, collaboration with August Nielsen and Harald Sund)
- Raufoss Church, Vestre Toten (consecrated 1939)
- Kapp Church, Østre Toten Municipality (consecrated 1939)
