= Sjåstad Church =

Church in Buskerud, Norway

- Sjåstad kirke
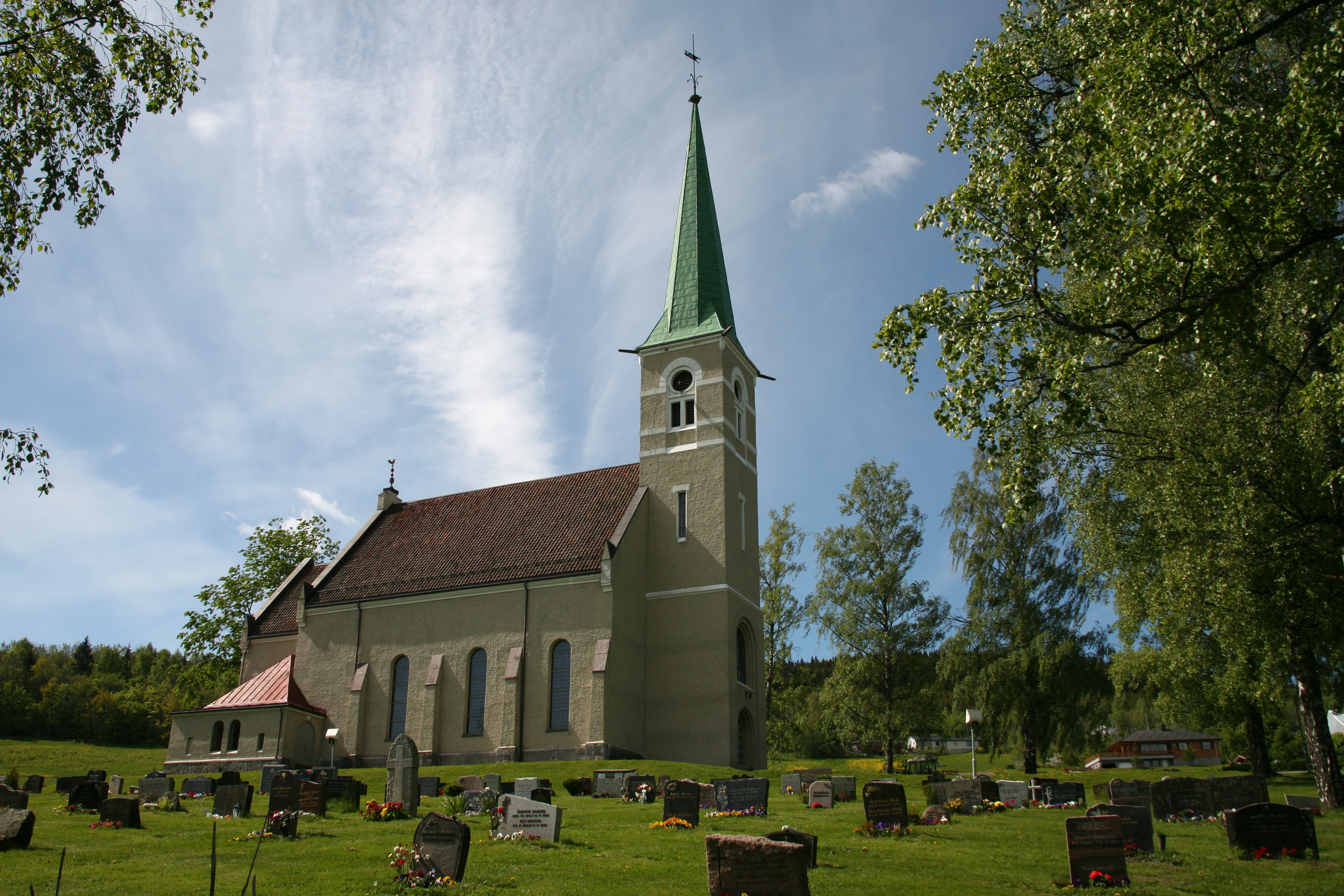
- View of the church
- Sjåstad Church
- 59°51′00″N 10°12′49″E
- Location: Lier Municipality, Buskerud
- Country: Norway
- Denomination: Church of Norway
- Churchmanship: Evangelical Lutheran

History
- Status: Parish church
- Founded: 1896
- Consecrated: 26 Sept 1896

Architecture
- Functional status: Active
- Architect: Henry Bucher
- Architectural type: Long church
- Completed: 1896 (130 years ago)

Specifications
- Capacity: 275
- Materials: Brick

Administration
- Diocese: Tunsberg
- Deanery: Drammen og Lier
- Parish: Sjåstad
- Norwegian Cultural Heritage Site
- Type: Church
- Status: Not protected
- ID: 85440

Sjåstad Church (Norwegian: Sjåstad kirke) is a parish church of the Church of Norway in Lier Municipality in Buskerud county, Norway. It is located in the village of Sjåstad. It is the church for the Sjåstad parish which is part of the Drammen og Lier prosti (deanery) in the Diocese of Tunsberg. The brown brick church was built in a long church design in 1896 using plans drawn up by the architect Henry Bucher. The church seats about 275 people.

== History ==
View of the church around 1900

The church building was designed by Henry Bucher, who built a number of churches in Toten. The church was consecrated on 26 September 1896. It is a long church in plastered brick with a rectangular nave, a rectangular choir surrounded by sacristies, and a west tower. The tower has a characteristic round window high up on all four sides, almost like portholes.

The church was rebuilt in 1959–1961. Originally, the nave had four large round-arched windows on each side. During the rebuilding, the east window on each side was bricked up, and the other windows were lowered and made narrower. The east window of the choir was bricked up on the same occasion. Otherwise, the bands and markings in the wall were removed during the renovation, and inside the choir, which had opened in its full width towards the nave, was given a narrower choir opening . The ceiling was lowered. For the centenary in 1996, the church was renovated again.

== See also ==
- List of churches in Tunsberg
