= Eigil Helland-Hansen =

Norwegian travel agent

- Born: 5 November 1910; Årstad, Bergen, Norway
- Died: 26 April 1997 (aged 86)
- Occupation: Travel agent
- Children: Grete Nash
- Parent: Bjørn Helland-Hansen

Eigil Helland-Hansen (5 November 1910 – 26 April 1997) was a Norwegian travel agent.

He was born in Årstad, Bergen to oceanographer Bjørn Helland-Hansen and Anna Marie Krag, and was the father of ceramist Grete Nash. Helland-Hansen was assigned with the organization Norway Travel Association (Norwegian: Landslaget for reiselivet) from 1934, and from 1940 he was responsible for the periodical Rutebok for Norge, which he edited for about forty years. He edited the magazine Reiseliv i Norge from 1946 to 1959.
