= Liabygda =

Village in Stranda Municipality, Norway

- Village
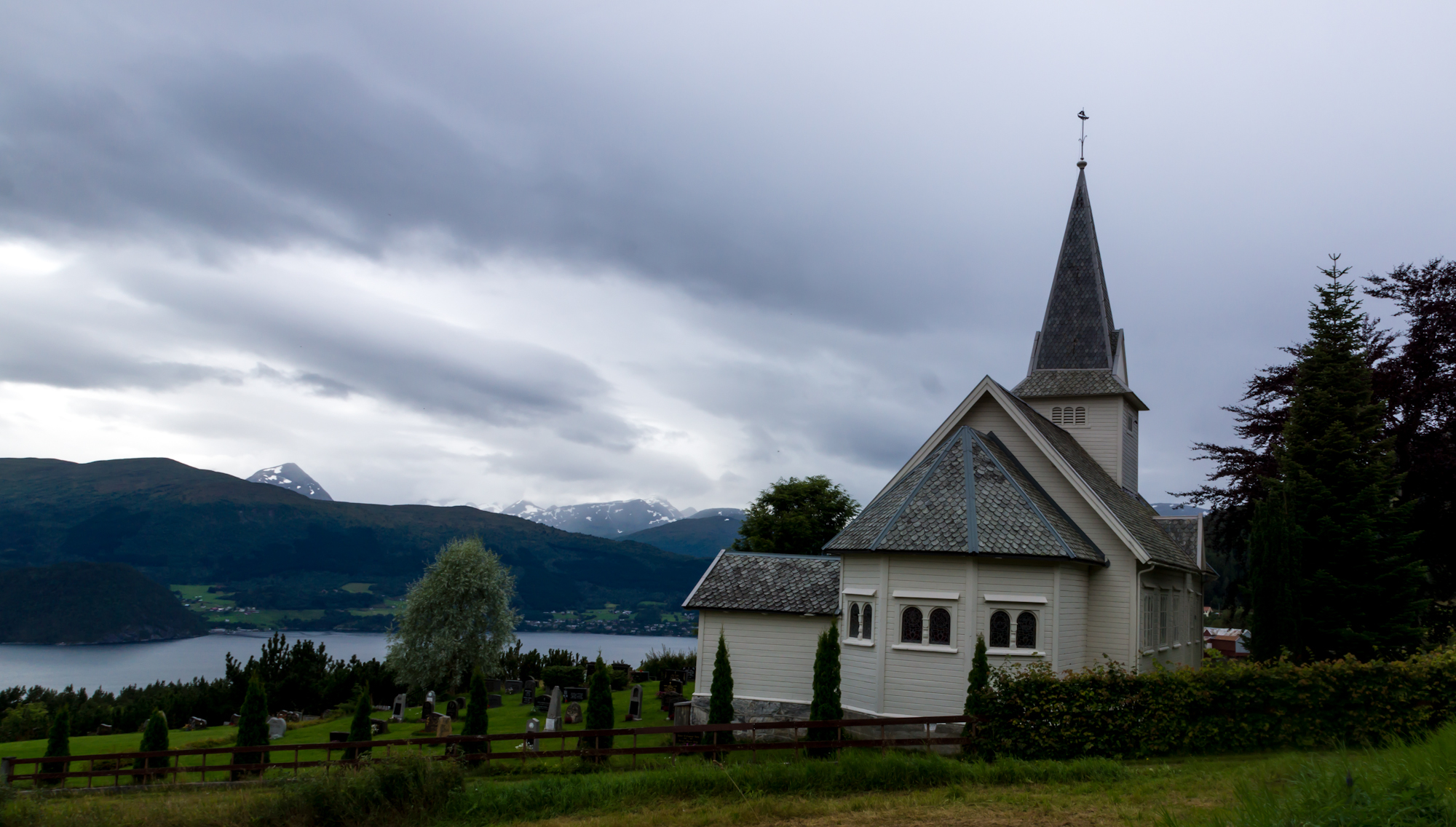
- View of the local church, looking towards the fjord
- Interactive map of Liabygda
- Location within Møre og Romsdal Location within Norway
- Coordinates: 62.3102°N 7.0712°E
- Country: Norway
- Region: Western Norway
- County: Møre og Romsdal
- District: Sunnmøre
- Municipality: Stranda Municipality
- Elevation: 200 m (660 ft)
- Time zone: UTC+01:00 (CET)
  - Summer (DST): UTC+02:00 (CEST)
- Post Code: 6212 Liabygda

Liabygda is a village in Stranda Municipality in Møre og Romsdal county, Norway. The village is located on the northern shore of the Norddalsfjorden, just north of the mouth of the Sunnylvsfjorden. Liabygda and its immediate vicinity are separated from the rest of Stranda Municipality by the fjord, and the area is surrounded on three sides by Fjord Municipality. There is a ferry from Liabygda at Gravaneset to the village of Stranda on the south side of the Storfjorden. Liabygda Church is located in this village, serving the part of Stranda on the eastern side of the fjord.
