= Heiberg Islands =

Group of four small islands in the Kara Sea

Transliterations from Russian Geyberg / Gejberg / Geiberg
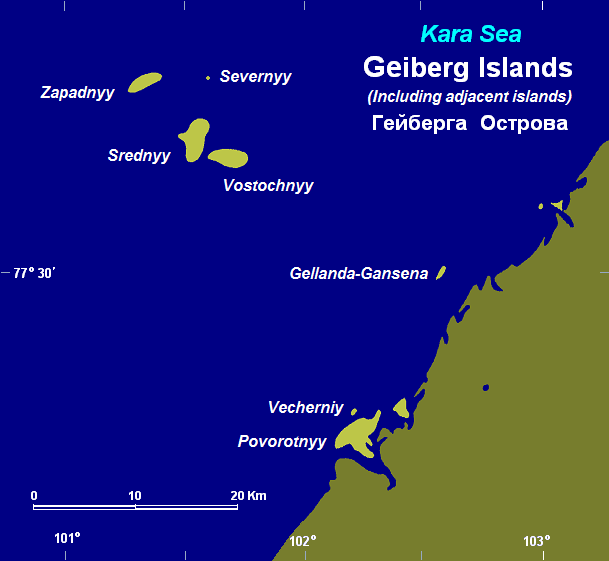
- The Heiberg Islands and adjacent coastal islands

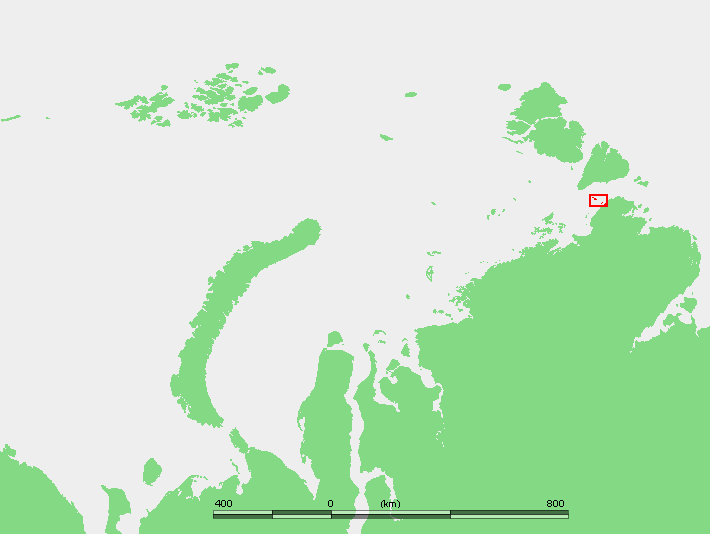
- Location of the Heiberg Islands in the Kara Sea

Geography
- Location: Kara Sea
- Coordinates: 77°40′N 101°27′E
- Archipelago: Heiberg Islands

Administration
- Russia

Demographics
- Population: 0

The Heiberg Islands, spelt Geyberg, Gejberg or Geiberg (Russian: острова Гейберга; ostrova Geyberga or also острова Акселя Гейберга) is a group of four small islands covered with tundra vegetation and with scattered stones on their shores. They lie in the Kara Sea, between the bleak coast of Siberia's Taymyr Peninsula and Severnaya Zemlya. These islands are between 35 and 45 km (22 and 28 mi) from the continental shore.

The Heiberg Islands are covering the entrance to the Vilkitsky Strait from the west. The latitude of this group is 77° 40' N and the longitude 101° 27' E. 77°40′N 101°27′E The largest island of the group is only about
5 km (3.1 mi) in length.

The sea surrounding the Heiberg Islands is covered with fast ice in the winter, which is long and bitter, and the climate is severe. The surrounding sea is obstructed by pack ice even in the summer, so that these islands are connected with the mainland for most of the year.

The Heiberg Islands were named by Fridtjof Nansen. He named them after Axel Heiberg, financial director of the Norwegian Ringnes brewery, who was the main financier of the Fram expedition to the Arctic.

This island group belongs to the Krasnoyarsk Krai administrative division of the Russian Federation. It is also part of the Great Arctic State Nature Reserve, the largest nature reserve of Russia.

== History ==
A Soviet polar meteorological station was established on Heiberg in 1940 to aid navigation of the Northern Sea Route. After the breakup of the USSR, commercial navigation in the Arctic went into decline.

More or less regular shipping is to be found only from Murmansk to Dudinka in the west and between Vladivostok and Pevek in the east. The areas around the Taymyr Peninsula, including the Vilkitsky Strait, see next to no shipping at all.

The polar station on the Heiberg Islands is now abandoned, with millions of rubles of equipment still there.

== Adjacent islands ==
- Closer to the coast there is a 3 km (1.9 mi) long island called Helland-Hansen Island (Ostrov Gellanda-Gansena). Usually this island is not considered part of the Heiberg group, but it lies quite close to it, at only 28 km ESE of Vostochnyy Island. This single island was named after Norwegian pioneer of modern oceanography Bjorn Helland-Hansen (b. 1877 in Oslo, d. 1957 in Bergen).
- Further south lie two islands close to the coast. Povorotnyy is the larger one close to the shore. The smaller one further offshore is called Vecherniy.

== See also ==
- Kara Sea
- List of islands of Russia
- List of research stations in the Arctic
- Severnaya Zemlya
