= Ås Church (Innlandet) =

Church in Innlandet, Norway

- Ås kirke
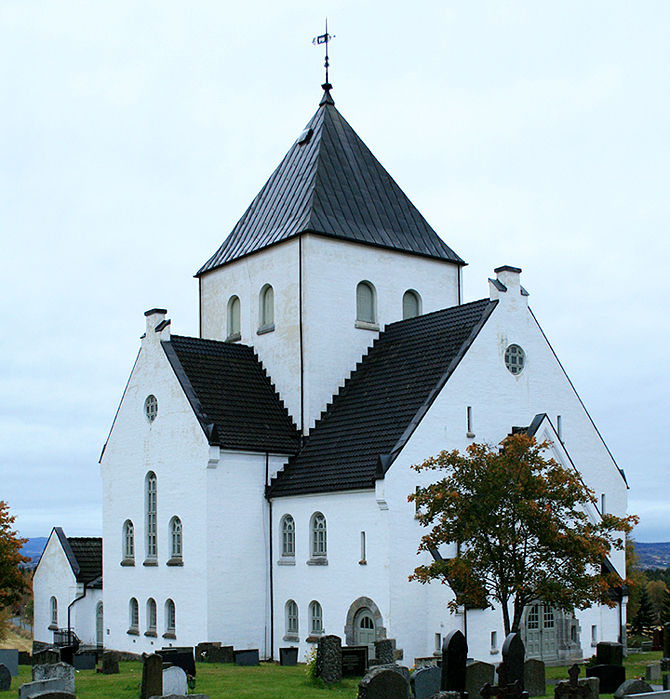
- View of the church
- Ås Church
- 60°40′10″N 10°41′58″E
- Location: Vestre Toten, Innlandet
- Country: Norway
- Denomination: Church of Norway
- Previous denomination: Catholic Church
- Churchmanship: Evangelical Lutheran

History
- Status: Parish church
- Founded: 13th century
- Consecrated: 9 March 1921

Architecture
- Functional status: Active
- Architect: Henry Bucher
- Architectural type: Cruciform
- Completed: 1921 (105 years ago)

Specifications
- Capacity: 500
- Materials: Stone

Administration
- Diocese: Hamar bispedømme
- Deanery: Toten prosti
- Parish: Ås
- Norwegian Cultural Heritage Site
- Type: Church
- Status: Protected
- ID: 85990

Ås Church (Norwegian: Ås kirke or historically, Aas kirke) is a parish church of the Church of Norway in Vestre Toten Municipality in Innlandet county, Norway. It is located in the village of Bøverbru. It is the church for the Ås parish which is part of the Toten prosti (deanery) in the Diocese of Hamar. The white, stone church was built in a cruciform design in 1921 using plans drawn up by the architect Henry Bucher. The church seats about 500 people.

== History ==
The earliest existing historical records of the church date back to the year 1337, but the church was not built that year. The first church in Ås was a wooden stave church that was likely built during the 13th century. According to an inscription on a wooden plate on the back of the altarpiece, the church must have been closed down and deserted from around 1570 until around 1665. Around 1665, the old church was torn down and a new church was built on the same site. The local parish priest Knud Sevaldsen Bang oversaw the construction of the new wooden long church. The new building was completed around the year 1670. During the 1700s, the church was too small, so two new transept wings were built to the north and south of the old nave, creating a cruciform floor plan. The church quickly fell into disrepair and during the late 1780s, the church was torn down.

In 1788–1789, a new church was built on the same site. This church was a wooden cruciform design with a central tower on the roof over the nave. This new building was consecrated on 9 September 1789. The building was thoroughly restored in the 1860s. On 15 July 1915, the church was struck by lightning and it burned down. Fortunately, some of the interior furnishings were able to be saved from the fire. After the site was cleared, work began on another replacement church. Henry Bucher was hired to design the new neo-Romanesque cruciform stone church. This building was consecrated on 9 March 1921. The church has a rather characteristic, compact shape (with relatively short cruciform arms) and a large imposing central tower.

== Media gallery ==
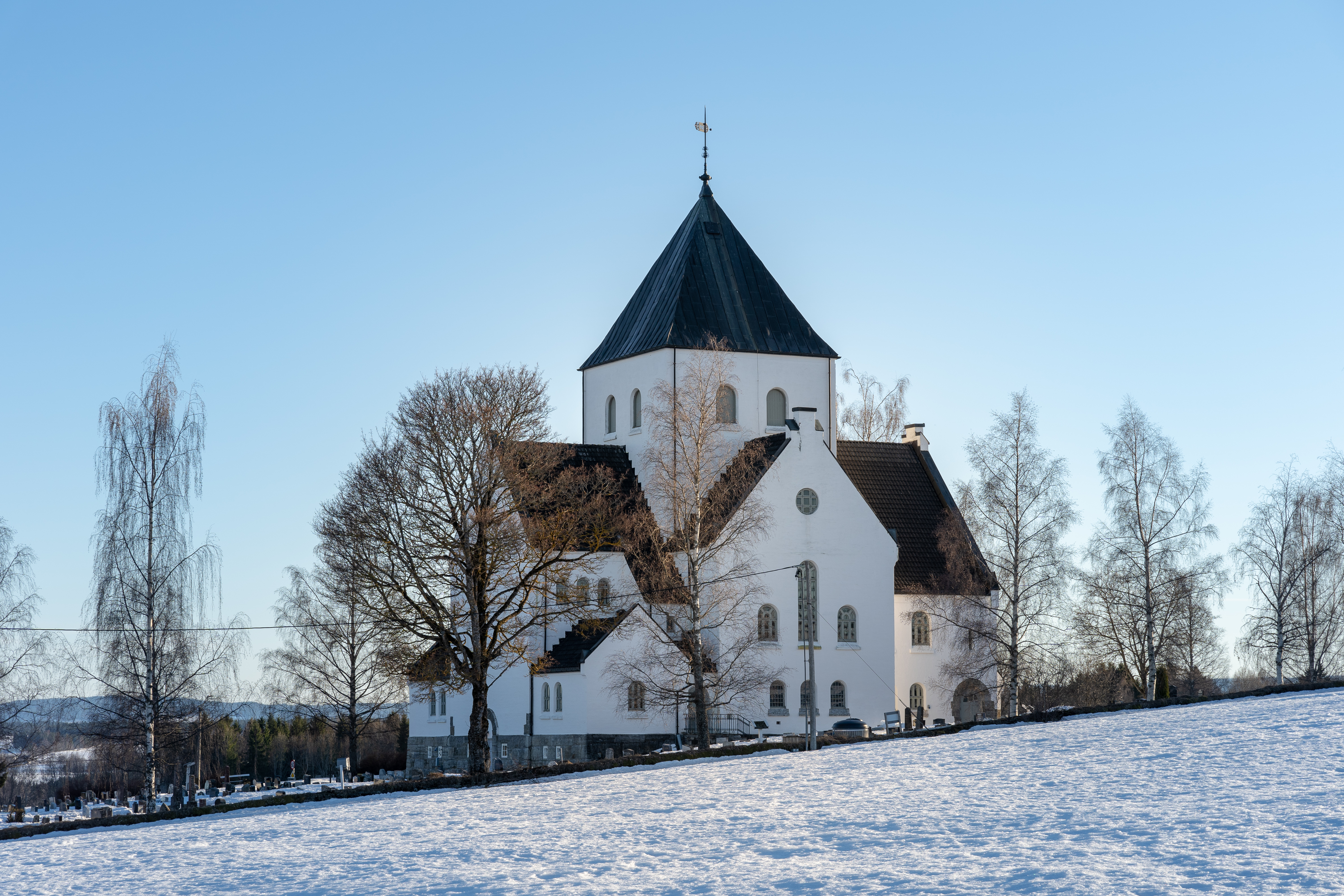

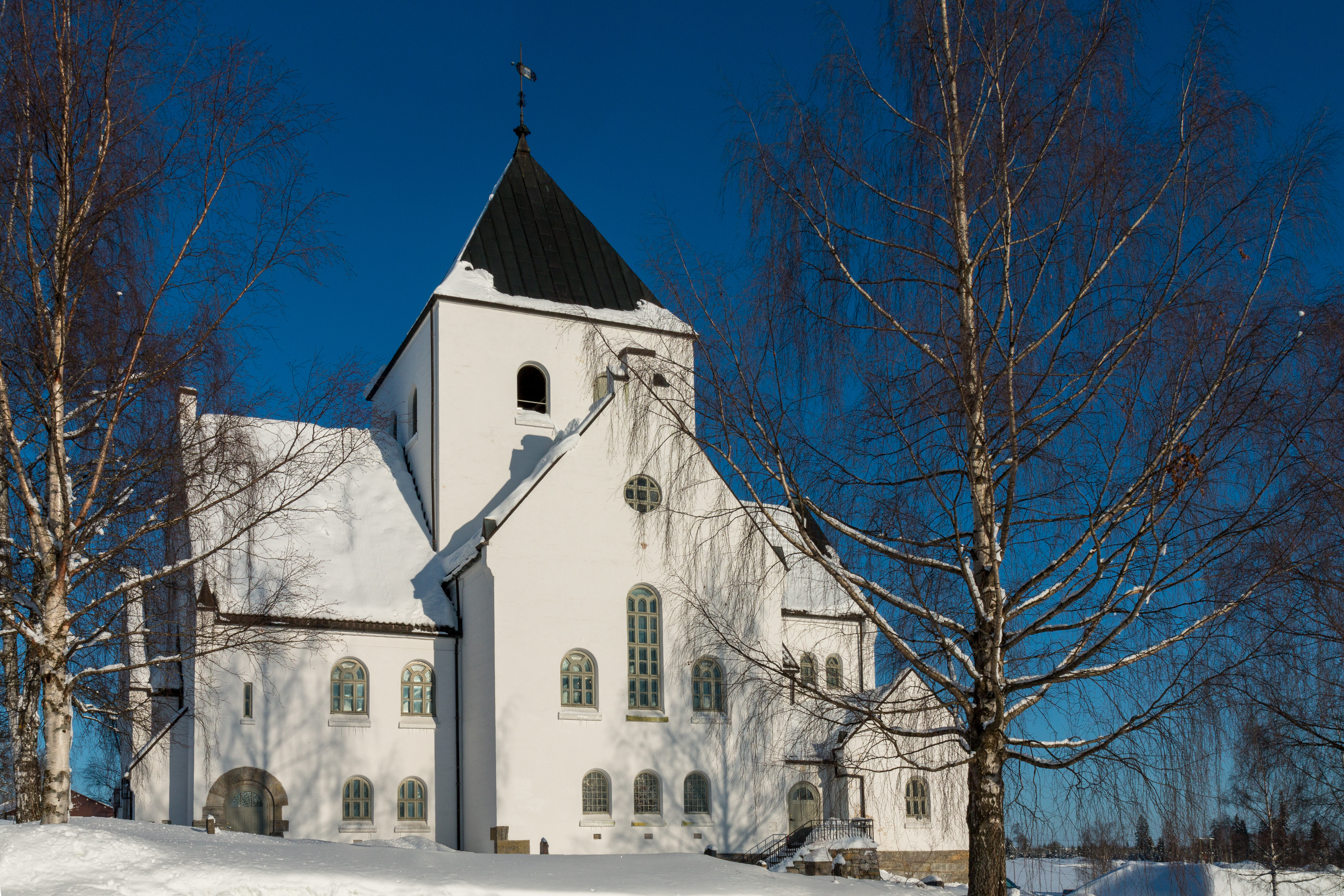

== See also ==
- List of churches in Hamar
