= Bjørn Helland-Hansen =

Norwegian oceanographer (1877–1957)

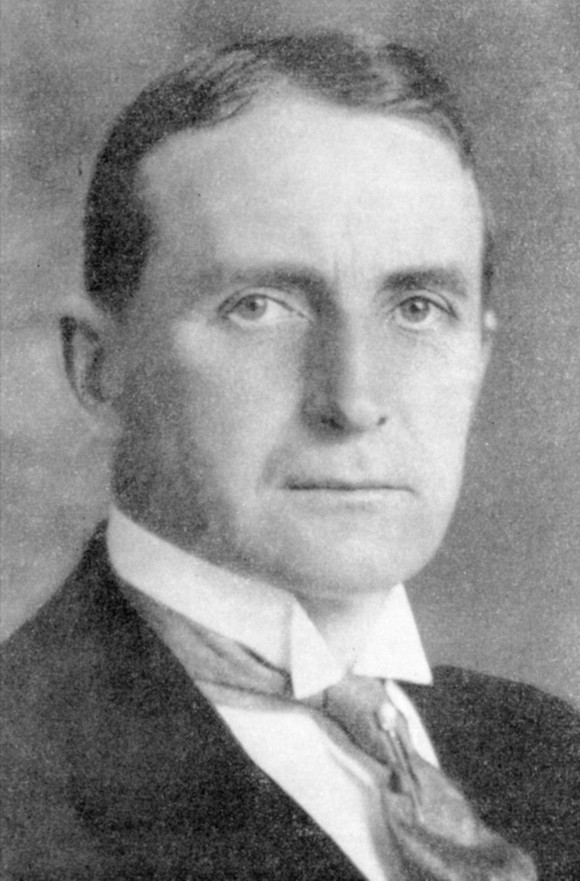
- Bjørn Helland-Hansen
- Born: 16 October 1877; Christiania (now Oslo)
- Died: 7 September 1957 (aged 79); Bergen
- Citizenship: Norwegian
- Known for: Atlantic Ocean "Helland-Hansen Photometer
- Children: Eigil Helland-Hansen
- Awards: Alexander Agassiz Medal (1933); Vega Medal (1941)
- Scientific career
- Fields: oceanography
- Workplaces: Geophysical Institute, University of Bergen

Bjørn Helland-Hansen (16 October 1877 – 7 September 1957) was a Norwegian pioneer in the field of modern oceanography. He studied the variation patterns of the weather in the northern Atlantic Ocean and of the atmosphere.

He studied both medicine and physics at the University of Christiania (now University of Oslo). He developed the "Helland-Hansen Photometer" in 1910, which was carried on board Michael Sars. It was operated for the first time close to the Azores at a depth between 500 and 700 m. In 1915 he became Professor of oceanography at the Bergen Museum, and in 1917 director of the Geophysical Institute, University of Bergen.

In 1933 he was awarded the Alexander Agassiz Medal. From 1946 to 1948, Helland-Hansen was President of the International Union of Geodesy and Geophysics (IUGG). He was a member of the Prussian Academy of Sciences and a member of the Member of the Academy of Sciences of the German Democratic Republic (DDR).

Helland-Hansen trained Alexander Kuchin, the Russian oceanographer who went to Antarctica with Roald Amundsen. An island in the Russian Arctic, east of the Geiberg Islands, has been named Gellanda-Gansena after Helland-Hansen.

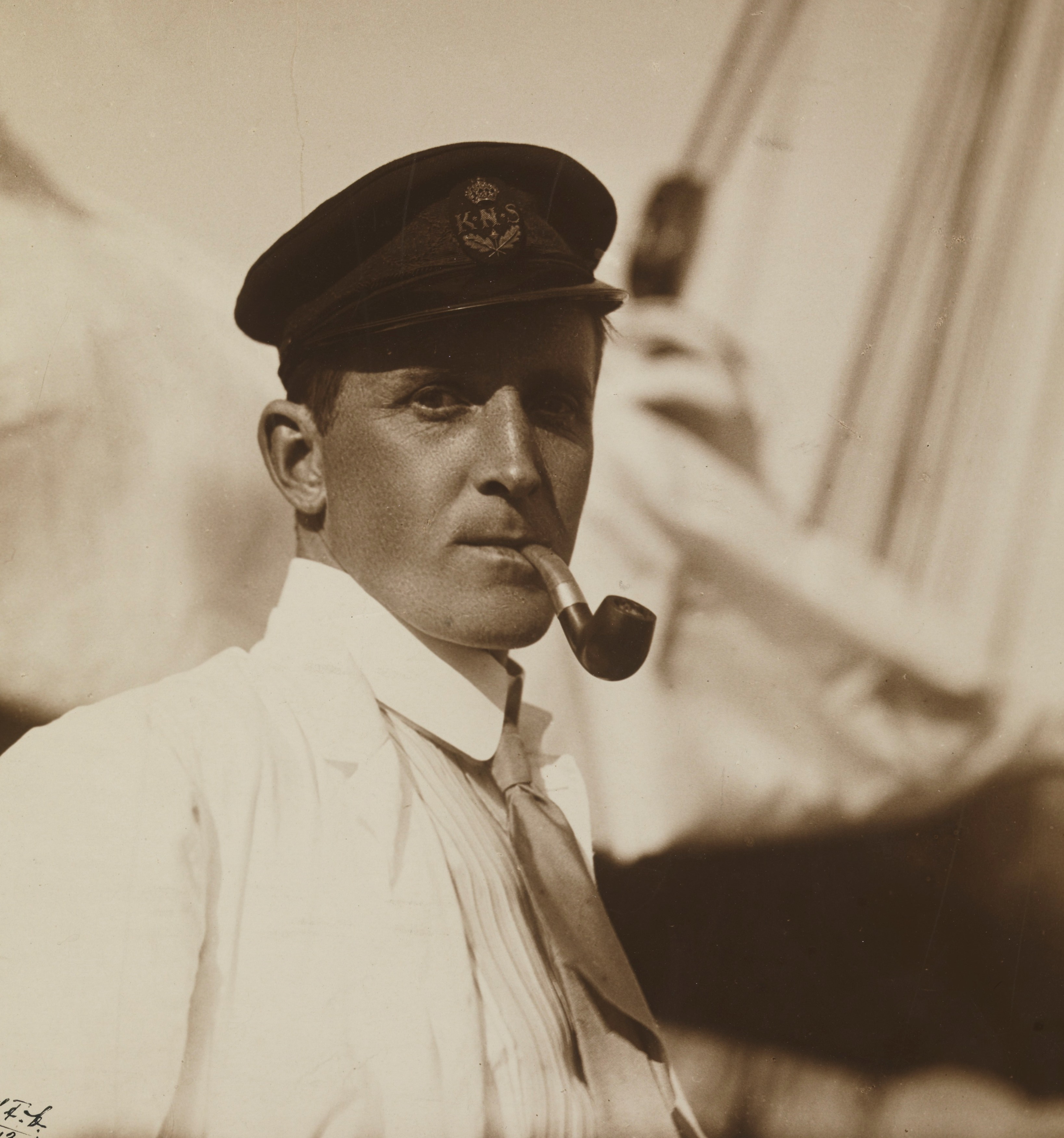
Bjørn Helland-Hansen (ca 1917)
