= Axel Heiberg =

Norwegian businessman and diplomat (1848–1932)

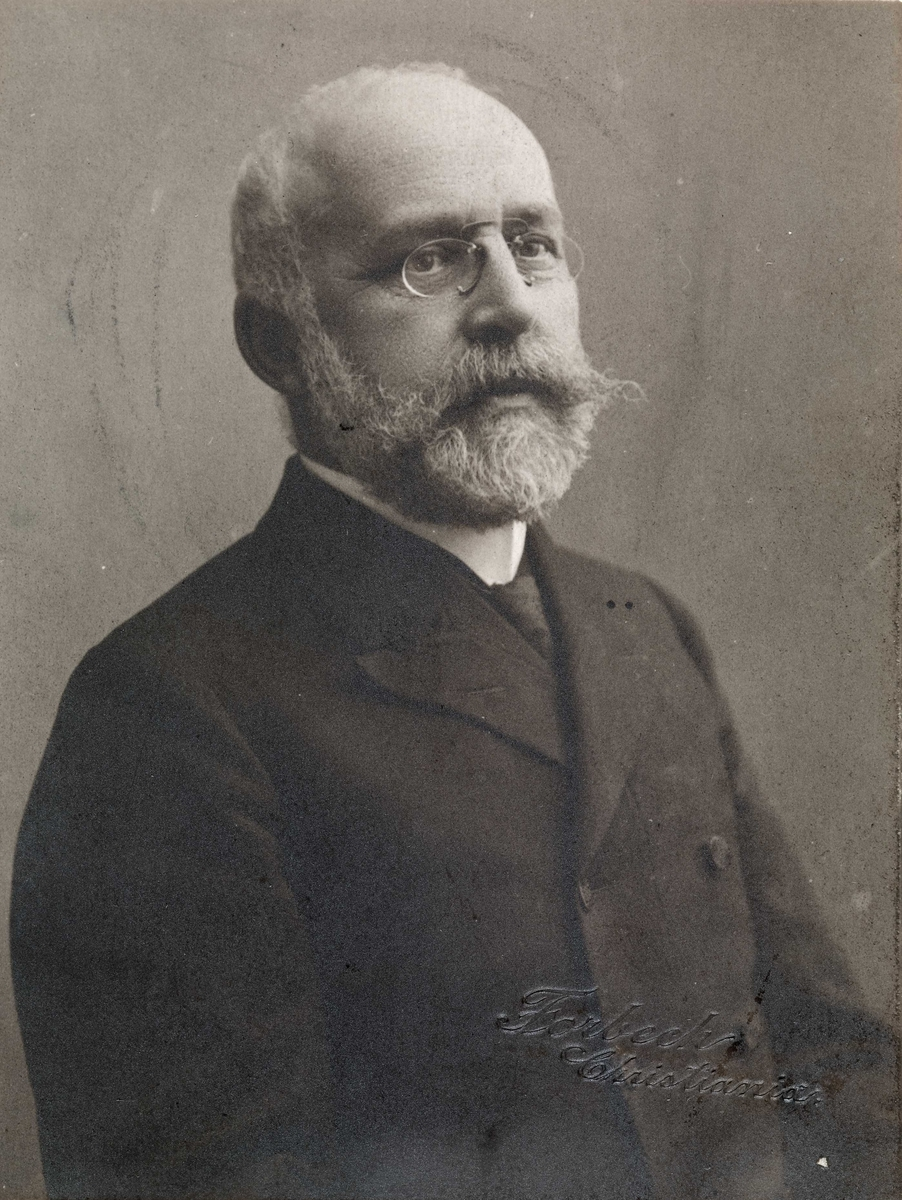
- Heiberg in the 1910s
- Born: 16 March 1848; Kristiania, Norway
- Died: 4 September 1932 (aged 84)

Axel Heiberg (16 March 1848 – 4 September 1932) was a Norwegian diplomat and financier as well as a patron of the arts and sciences.

== Biography ==
Heiberg was born in Kristiania (now Oslo), Norway. He was the son of Johan Fritzner Heiberg (1805–1883) and Emma Wilhelmine Munch (1818–1888). His father was a professor at the University of Kristiania and general surgeon in the Norwegian Army.

Heiberg studied abroad and was for a period Norwegian consul in China. He returned to Norway where in 1876 together with the brothers Amund Ringnes and Ellef Ringnes he financed the creation of the Ringnes brewery. Together with shipping magnate Thomas Fearnley, the brewery sponsored the polar expeditions of Fridtjof Nansen and Otto Sverdrup, and funded the construction of the exploration vessel Fram. This led to Heiberg's name being given to Axel Heiberg Island in Canada, the Axel Heiberg Glacier in Antarctica as well as Heiberg Islands in Siberia.

In 1878 Heiberg was one of the founders of the rowing club Christiania RK. Later he founded the "Consul Axel Heiberg and Manufacturer Hans B. Fasmer Fund" (in 1915 transferred to the Fridtjof Nansen Fund). In 1898 he was one of the founders of the Norwegian Forestry Society, and was chairman until 1923. He also funded the statues of Henrik Ibsen and Bjørnstjerne Bjørnson located outside the National Theater in Oslo.

== Personal life ==
He was married to Ragnhild Meyer (1849–1937), daughter of landowner, businessman and philanthropist, Thorvald Meyer (1818–1909). They had one child, Ingeborg Heiberg (1884–1974), who married businessman and landowner, N. O. Young Fearnley (1881–1961).

== Other sources ==
- Waldemar Christofer Brøgger (1932), "Axel Heiberg in memoriam", Nordisk Tidskrift för Vetenskap, Konst och Industri.
