= Permanenten =

Museum of art in Bergen, Norway

Coordinates: 60°23′26.257″N 5°19′26.929″E

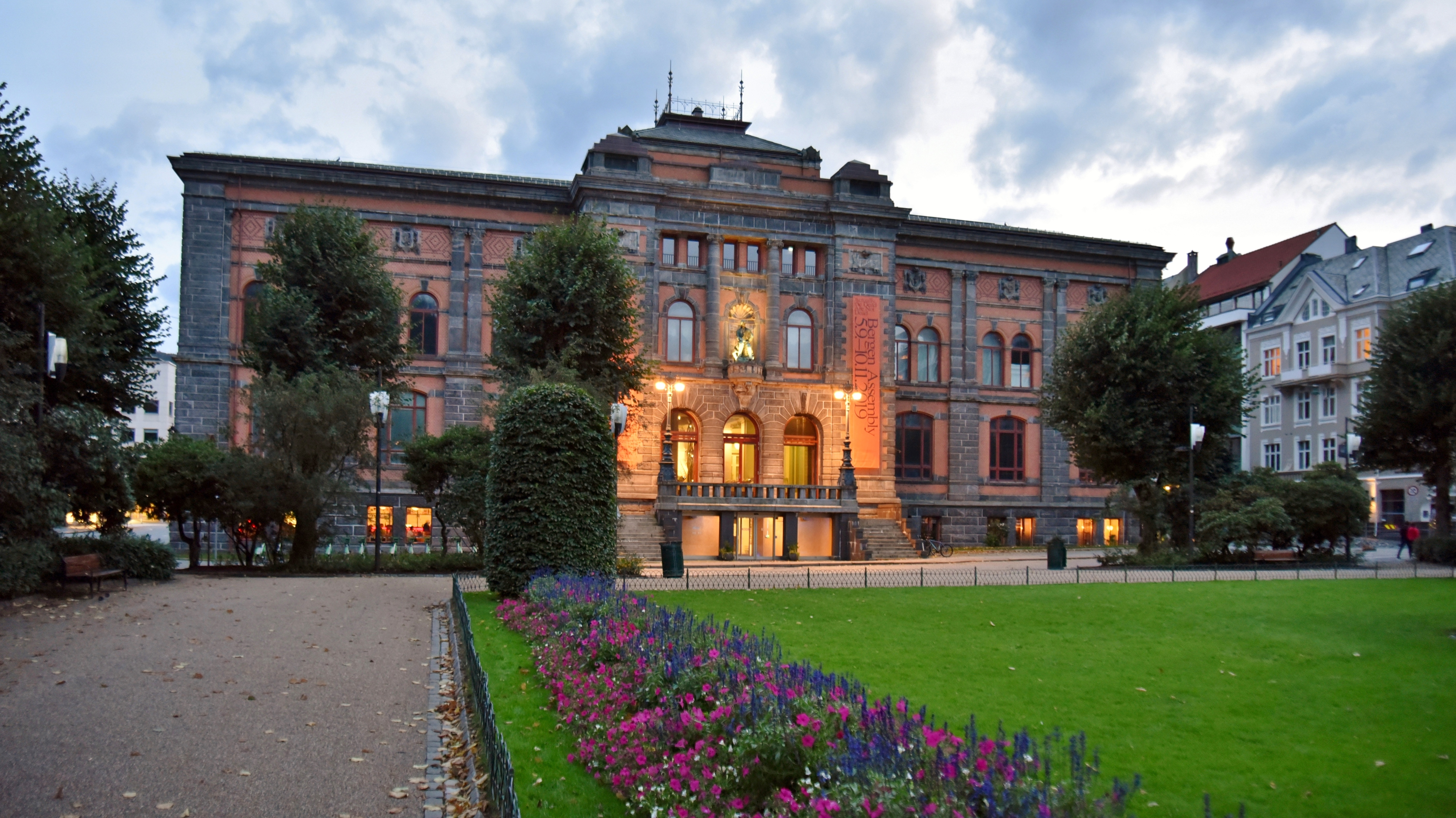
- Building facade
- Established: 1887; 139 years ago
- Location: Nordahl Bruns gate 9, 5014 Bergen, Norway
- Website: https://www.kodebergen.no/en/museums/permanenten

Permanenten (Norwegian: Permanenten Vestlandske kunstindustrimuseum), formerly the West Norway Museum of Decorative Art, also referred to as KODE 1, is a museum in Bergen, Norway. The museum is part of the KODE Art Museums and Composer Homes and was originally established in 1887 at the initiative of Johan Bøgh. In 1896 the museum moved into a permanent exhibition building, a Renaissance Revival structure designed by Henry Bucher (1864–1944). The building caught fire during the 1916 Bergen Fire but was saved.

The collections include older local works in silver, furniture, glass, porcelain, and textiles. Upon its opening, the museum received substantial donations from the merchant Christian Sundt.

During the first years, the Bergen Art Gallery occupied the top floor. The collection was then moved from there to the former power plant building (Norwegian: Lysverksbygget) after it became available. The Fisheries Museum also occupied the ground floor.

After merging with Bergen Art Museum, the museum has been a venue for more temporary exhibitions. Its emphasis remains on crafts from the past 500 years, and also its Chinese Collection, a unique assembly of Chinese art. This is mostly a bequest from Johan Wilhelm Normann Munthe (1864–1935), who lived in China from age 22 until his death in 1935.

The museum was also responsible for the Alvøen site and Damsgård Manor, but this has now been taken over by the new Bergen City Museum.

== Thefts ==
=== 2010 thefts ===
In 2010, intruders broke into the museum via a glass ceiling, rappelled down, and took 56 objects from the China Collection, which included vases and imperial seals. Police said that the alarms never sounded.

=== 2013 thefts ===
In January 2013, 22 additional objects were taken from the China Collection, including vases, statues, and imperial seals. Reportedly, thieves broke in around 5am on a Saturday. Surveillance cameras picked up photos of two young men wearing high-beam headlights and using crowbars to smash glass cases. The break in and thefts took mere minutes. Police told Norwegian Broadcasting (NRK) that they were also investigating two car fires in Bergen reported around the same time. The fires were considered unusual for the area, and some speculated that they were set to divert police attention away from the museum break-in. Erlend Høyersten, then director of Bergen's group of art museums (Kunstmuseene i Bergen) told newspaper Aftenposten: “The thieves operated quickly, effectively and professionally. It’s entirely clear that they knew what they were after.” Reportedly Høyersten thought that the thieves had a “shopping list” of sorts when they hit the group’s Permanenten Vestlandske Kunstindustrimuseum, and likely were hired by carry out the theft by clients keen on obtaining Chinese artifacts.

After the January 2013 break in, KODE hired Roald Eliassen as director of security. He has been quoted as saying about the crime: "We had objects that somebody wanted, and he hired someone to take them.” Eliassen has also said: "The government in China doesn't think they're stolen objects. They think they belong to them. They won't take it seriously, won't follow the trail. That's the biggest problem.”

Police arrested six men in connection with the break-in, but reportedly determined that they were foot soldiers who either could not or would not share information about who hired them.

=== Location of stolen artifact ===
In the wake of the publicity around the 2013 heist, authorities received a tip about an object taken in the 2010 break-in. They were told that it was on display in a Shanghai airport. However, Bergen police lacked the jurisdiction or power to follow up, and Norwegian officials did not take action. Kenneth Didriksen, the head of Norway's art-crime unit indicated that Norwegian officials were wary of upsetting a delicate relationship with China. Didriksen is quoted as saying to GQ's Alex W. Palmer, "If we say an item is in China, they say, ‘Prove it,'" and "We don't want to insult anyone."

== Return of Chinese artifacts ==
In 2013, Chinese billionaire Huang Nubo visited the museum to view a collection of marble columns taken from the Old Summer Palace of Beijing. Reportedly, he began to weep and told the museum director that the columns had no business being displayed in Norway. Huang later donated $1.6 million to KODE, which he says was to help the museum upgrade security. A spokesman for KODE said that the agreement did not concern security. Soon thereafter, the museum shipped seven of the marble columns back to China to be displayed at Peking University, Huang's alma mater, on permanent loan. Huang has claimed this return was unrelated to his donation.
