= Amund Ringnes (brewery owner, 1840) =

Norwegian businessman and brewer

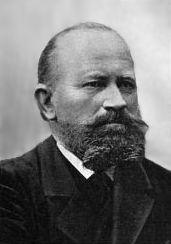
Amund Ringnes (1901)

Amund Ringnes (7 October 1840 – 13 January 1907) was a Norwegian businessman, brewery owner and patron.

He was born in Krødsherad, Buskerud, the son of Anders Knudsen Ringnes (1813–75), farmer, and his wife Maren Amundsdatter (1815–76). He grew up at the Ringnes farm, and commenced working at Akers Mekaniske Verksted in 1860. He left Akers Mek. Verksted in 1865, and was employed by the brewery Christiania Bryggeri. In 1876, he founded Ringnes & Compani brewery with his brother Ellef Ringnes and the businessman Axel Heiberg. It was the eighth brewery in Christiania (now Oslo), and later had its name changed to Ringnes Bryggeri.

The Ringnes brewery became successful, and Amund Ringnes and his brother became benefactors in Christiania. They invested in the construction of the Holmenkollen Line and sanatoriums in the Holmenkollen area. They also sponsored Fridtjof Nansen's Fram expedition, which they at one point led together with businessman Axel Heiberg and shipowner Thomas Fearnley. The explorer Otto Sverdrup's 1898–1902 Fram expedition also received financial support from the two brothers; he named two discovered islands after them: Amund Ringnes Island and Ellef Ringnes Island.

On 19 September 1870, Ringnes married Laura Jensen (1850–1902). In 1896, his brother Ellef bought the Ringnes farm from him, which he earlier had inherited from his father. He said to his brother: "Ellef, you have 14 children, and I have only six, so it is most correct that you own the farm". Amund Ringnes was decorated as a Knight, First Class of the Royal Norwegian Order of St. Olav in 1898. He was upgraded to Commander, Second Class in 1902. In 1899, he built the country house Ringartun in Buskerud, where he maintained a hospitable home. He died on 13 January 1907 in Kristiania, aged 66. His grandson, Amund Ringnes (1905–80), became also a brewery owner at Ringnes brewery.
