= Nora Industrier =

Norwegian consumer discretionary company

Nora Industrier was a Norwegian company, most of its history involved in manufacturing of soft drinks and foodstuffs.

It traced its history back to the brewery St. Halvard Bryggeri, established in Pilestredet in 1877. It originally brewed beer only, from 1882 soda as well. In 1918 the brewery relocated, changed its name to Nora Fabrikker and made soda its main product. It was owned by the beer breweries Frydenlund, Schou and Ringnes. In 1978 Nora Fabrikker was the largest soda producer in Norway. Since 1953 the company was also involved in other foodstuffs.

In 1978, Nora Fabrikker merged with Frydenlund Schous Bryggeri (a meantime merger) and Ringnes to form Nora Industrier. It involved itself in several non-food fields, buying Helly Hansen in 1985, Bjølsen Valsemølle and Idun Gjærfabrikken in 1986 and Nidar in 1987. The drinks branch was split out as the daughter company Ringnes in 1988. In 1991 Nora Industrier was fused with Orkla Borregaard to create the Orkla Group. The brand Nora still exists, and is owned by Stabburet.

CEOs include Leif Frode Onarheim (1980–1991).
