= Ringnes =

Norwegian brewery

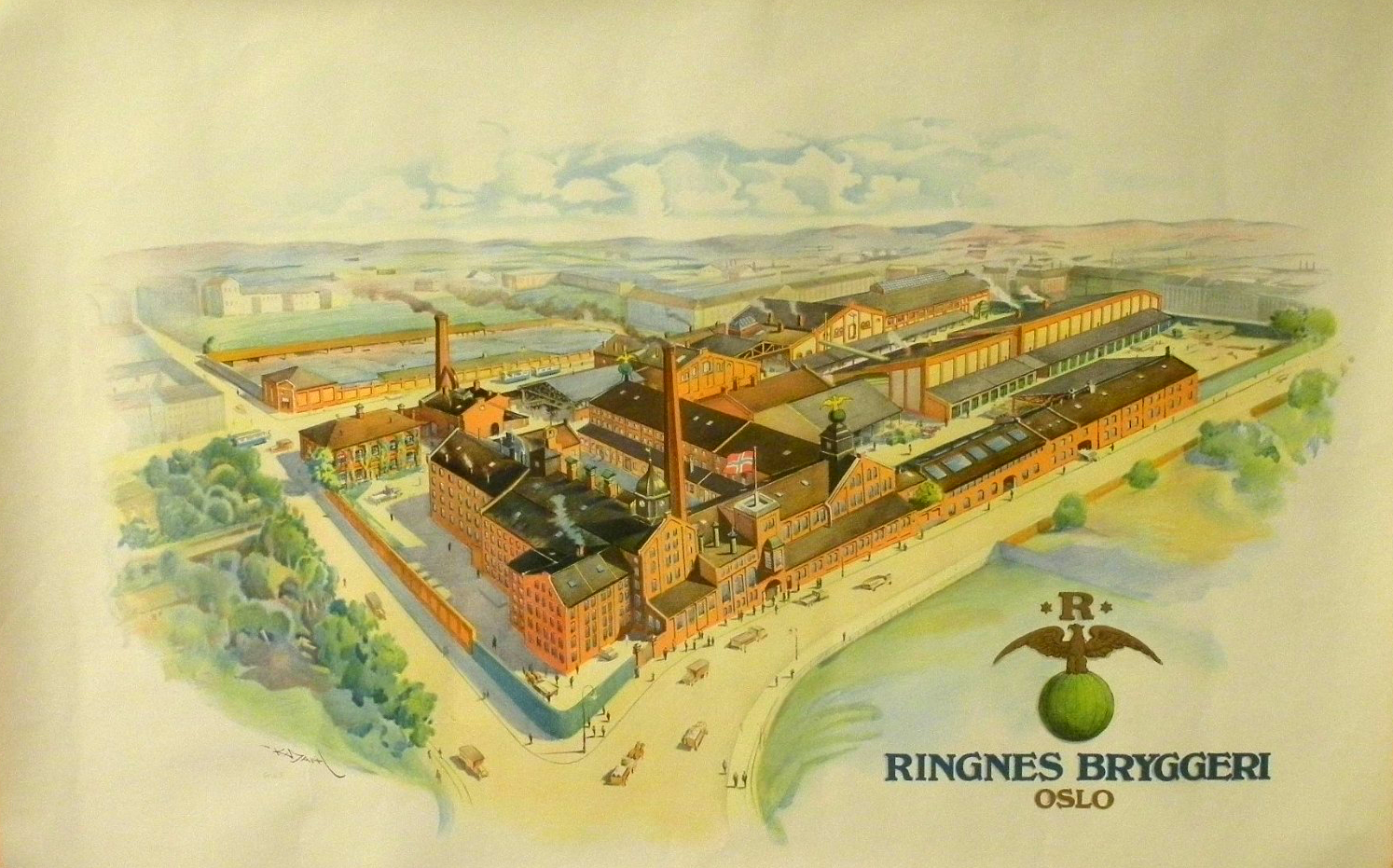
Ringnes Brewery Headquarters Oslo

Ringnes is the largest brewer in Norway. Ringnes is part of the Carlsberg Group.

== History ==
Ringnes AS was founded in 1876. The company's brewery in the Grünerløkka district of Oslo produced its first beer in 1877. The brewery was founded by brothers Amund and Ellef Ringnes (Amund was the brewer, Ellef the administrator and salesman) together with financial director Axel Heiberg. Amund Ringnes (1840–1907) and Ellef Ringnes (1842–1929), were both born and grew up on the historic Ringnes farm in Krødsherad.

Ringnes produces beer, soft drinks and mineral water. Ringnes has six production plants: Nittedal (main plant Gjelleråsen), Trondheim (EC Dahl's Brewery), Arendal (Arendals Brewery), Bodø (Nordland brewery), Larvik (Farris mineral water) and Imsdalen in Østerdalen (Imsdalfabrikken).

The company sponsored the polar expeditions of Fridtjof Nansen and Otto Sverdrup and funded the construction of the exploration vessel Fram. During his exploration of the high Canadian Arctic in 1900, Sverdrup named three large islands after his sponsors (Axel Heiberg Island, Amund Ringnes Island, and Ellef Ringnes Island). The Heiberg Islands (Гейберга Острова) in the Russian Arctic were named after Axel Heiberg, and Ostrov Ringnes (Остров Рингнес), the largest island of the Mona group in the Kara Sea, was named after the brewery.

Ringnes remained a family-owned business until 1978, when it merged with De sammensluttede Bryggerier A/S (which had been formed by the union of drinks companies Frydenlund and Schou) forming Nora Industrier. Later they also bought family-owned traditional brands as E. C. Dahls Brewery (1987), Arendals (1980) and Tou (1990).

Nora in turn merged with Orkla Group in 1991. Orkla placed Ringnes into a combined business unit, together with Swedish brewer Pripps. In 2000 Orkla made a deal with Danish drinks giant Carlsberg whereby Pripps Ringnes became a part of Carlsberg, in exchange for Orkla owning 40% of Carlsberg. When, in 2004, Carlsberg bought out Orkla's shares, Ringnes was for the first time entirely owned by a foreign company. Christian Ringnes, a descendant of the founders told daily business newspaper Dagens Næringsliv that "a country without a leading beer brand is like a man without potency", and called the sale a national catastrophe.

== Ringnes products ==
- Ringnes Pilsner
- Ringnes Gold
- Ringnes Platinum
- Ringnes Bayer
- Ringnes Julebrus
- Corona Extra (bottler and distributor)
- Schweppes (bottler and distributor)
- Frydenlund
- Schous
- Munkholm
- Vørterøl
- Dahls Ingefærøl
- Dahls julebrus
- Imsdal mountain spring water
- Farris mineral water
- Mozell
- Eventyrbrus
- Tou Eplemost
- Tou Pilsner
- Nora Eplemost
- Sino Appelsinjuice
- Solo
- Villa
- Battery Energy Drink (bottler and distributor)

Ringnes is the sole bottler and distributor of PepsiCo beverages in Norway; these products include:

- 7 Up / 7 Up Free
- Mountain Dew
- Pepsi
- Pepsi Max
- Lipton Ice Tea (bottler and distributor)
- Gatorade (bottler and distributor)
