= Stange (disambiguation) =

Stange is a municipality in Innlandet county, Norway.

Stange may also refer to:

== Places ==
- Stange Ice Shelf, an ice shelf in Stange Sound in Antarctica
- Stange Sound, a sound along the coast of Palmer Land in Antarctica
- Stange or Stangebyen, a village in Stange Municipality in Innlandet county, Norway
- Stange Church, a church in Stange Municipality in Innlandet county, Norway
- Stange Commons, a municipal commons area in Stange Municipality in Innlandet county, Norway
- Stange Station, a railway station in Stange Municipality in Innlandet county, Norway

== Other ==
- Stange (Glass), a tall, cylindrical glass traditionally used for drinking beer
- Stange (surname), a list of people with the surname Stange
- Stange SK, a sports club in Stange Municipality in Innlandet county, Norway
