= Romedal =

Romedal may refer to:

- Romedal (village), a village in Stange Municipality in Innlandet county, Norway
- Romedal Municipality, a former municipality in the old Hedmark county, Norway
- Romedal Church, a church in Stange Municipality in Innlandet county, Norway
- Romedal Commons, a commons neighboring Stange Commons in Stange Municipality in Innlandet county, Norway
