= Tangen Church =

Church in Innlandet, Norway

- Tangen kirke
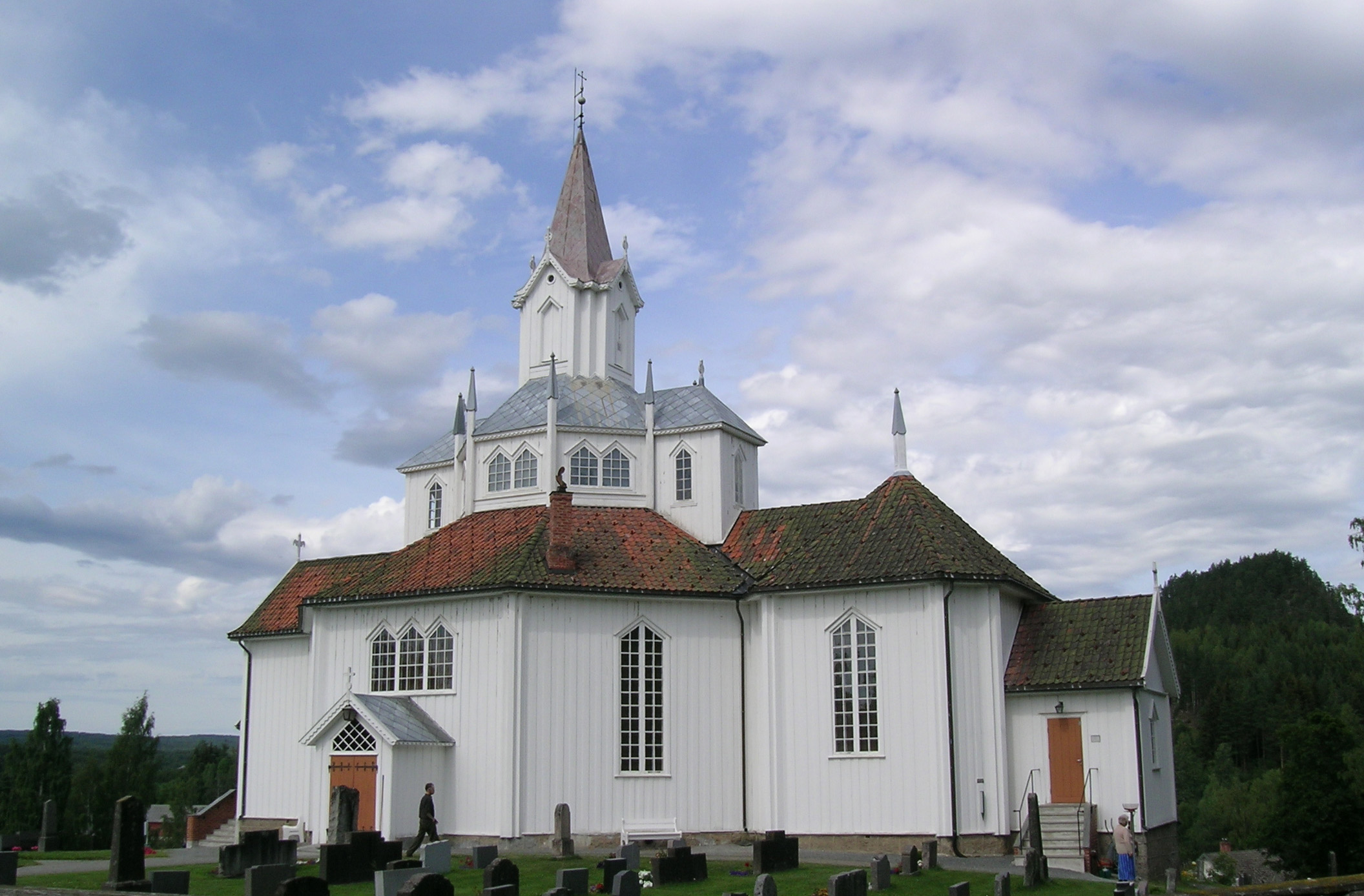
- View of the church
- Tangen Church
- 60°37′05″N 11°15′52″E
- Location: Stange Municipality, Innlandet
- Country: Norway
- Denomination: Church of Norway
- Churchmanship: Evangelical Lutheran

History
- Status: Parish church
- Founded: 1861
- Consecrated: 9 August 1861

Architecture
- Functional status: Active
- Architect: Christian Henrik Grosch
- Architectural type: Octagonal
- Completed: 1861 (165 years ago)

Specifications
- Capacity: 450
- Materials: Wood

Administration
- Diocese: Hamar bispedømme
- Deanery: Hamar domprosti
- Parish: Tangen
- Norwegian Cultural Heritage Site
- Type: Church
- Status: Protected
- ID: 85606

Tangen Church (Norwegian: Tangen kirke) is a parish church of the Church of Norway in Stange Municipality in Innlandet county, Norway. It is located in the village of Tangen. It is one of the churches for the Tangen parish which is part of the Hamar domprosti (deanery) in the Diocese of Hamar. The white, wooden church was built in an octagonal design in 1861 using plans drawn up by the architect Christian Henrik Grosch. The church seats about 450 people.

== History ==
In 1837, Berte and Jon Grimerud donated land from the Tangen farm to the Stange Church parish. It took some time, but on 23 March 1857, the new Tangen parish was separated from the Stange parish. Plans for a new church on the donated land began soon afterwards. The church was designed by Christian Heinrich Grosch and the lead builder was Hans Gulbrandsen Røisi. The nave is octagonal and choir and church porch are connected on opposite ends of the octagon. There are sacristies in the extension of the choir. The middle part of the nave has a raised roof supported by eight columns. Grosch designed many octagonal churches in Norway, but this is the only one with a raised central part which is supposed to be influenced by stave church architecture. Tangen church was consecrated on 9 August 1861 by the local Provost Paul Winsnes (the husband of Hanna Winsnes who wrote a famous Norwegian cookbook).

== Media gallery ==
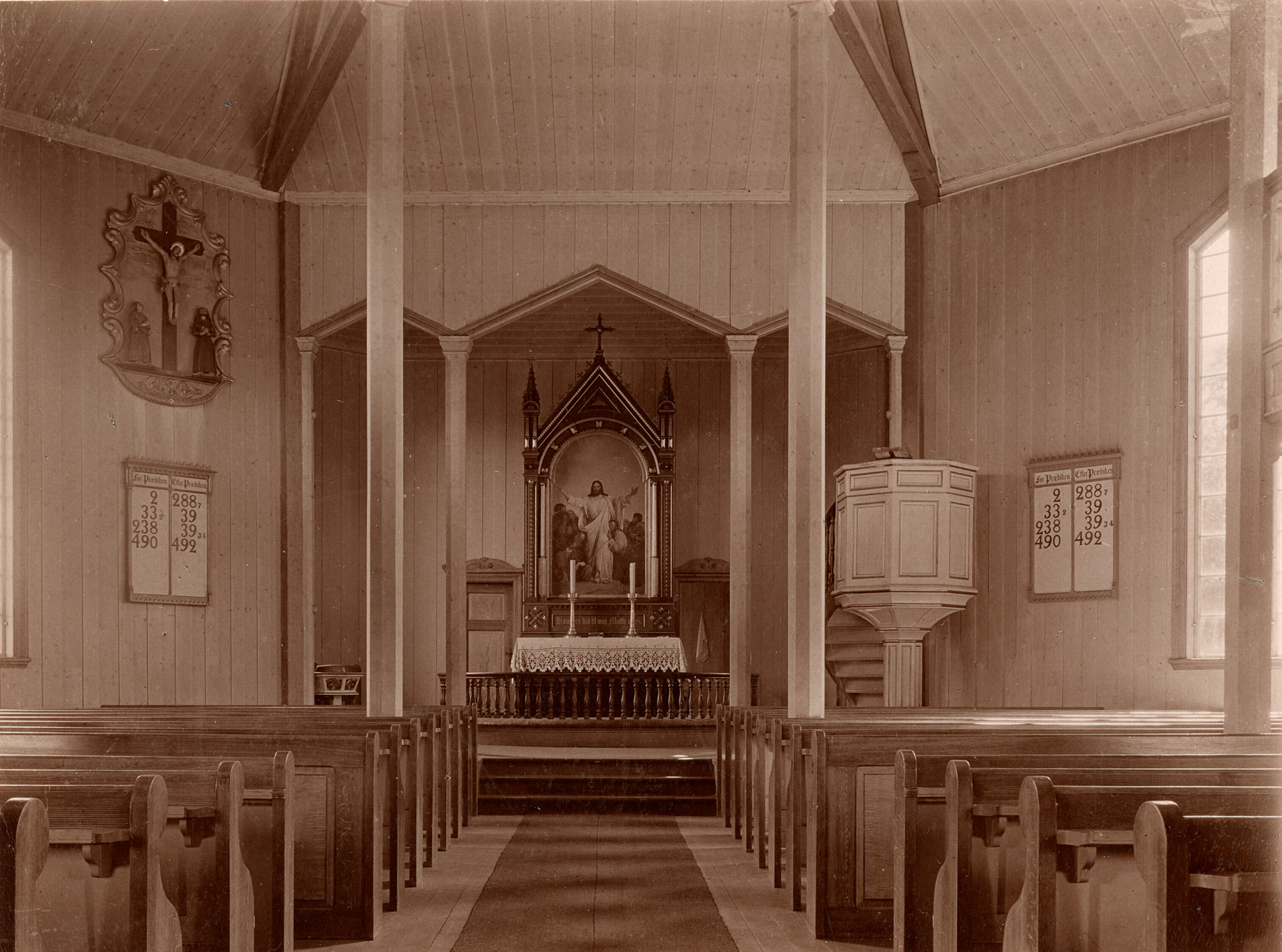

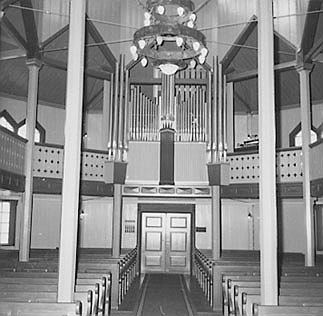

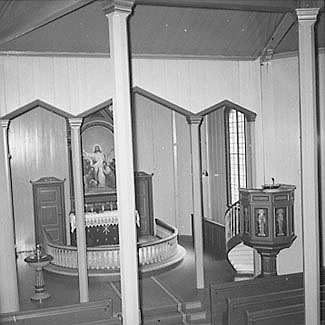

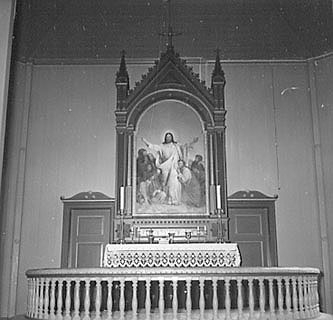

== See also ==
- List of churches in Hamar
