= Starhellinga =

Village in Stange Municipality, Norway

Starhellinga Sørbygdafeltet
- Village
- Interactive map of Starhellinga; Sørbygdafeltet
- Location within Innlandet Location within Norway
- Coordinates: 60.72531°N 11.26612°E
- Country: Norway
- Region: Eastern Norway
- County: Innlandet
- District: Hedmarken
- Municipality: Stange Municipality

Area
  - Total: 0.38 km^{2} (0.15 sq mi)
- Elevation: 170 m (560 ft)

Population (2024)
  - Total: 418
  - Density: 1,100/km^{2} (2,800/sq mi)
- Time zone: UTC+01:00 (CET)
  - Summer (DST): UTC+02:00 (CEST)
- Post Code: 2335 Stange

Starhellinga or Sørbygdafeltet is a village in Stange Municipality in Innlandet county, Norway. The village is located about 2 kilometres (1.2 mi) southwest of the village of Romedal and about 3.5 kilometres (2.2 mi) east of the village of Stangebyen.

The 0.38-square-kilometre (94-acre) village area has a population (2024) of 418 and a population density of 1,100 inhabitants per square kilometre (2,800/sq mi).

== Notable people ==
- Simen Schikulski, a musician and bass player in the Norwegian grammy-winning pop band Team Me
