= Eiliv Austlid =

Norwegian farmer and army officer

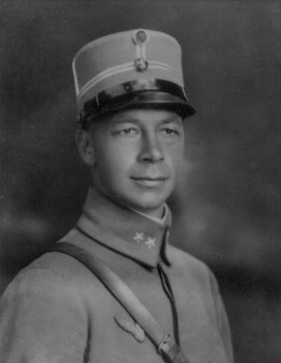
- Born: 6 May 1899; Ullensvang, Norway
- Died: 15 April 1940 (aged 40); Hagevollen, Dovre
- Burial place: Stange Church, Norway
- Relatives: Wife: Dagny Landheim (born 1904); Children: Arnfinn (1926); Bjørnar (1929); Hallvard (1931); Olav (1934); Gunnhild (1939); Parents: Andreas Austlid; Gunhild Offigsbø
- Military career
- Allegiance: Norway
- Branch: Norwegian Army
- Service years: 1923–1940
- Rank: Captain
- Conflicts: Second World War: Norwegian Campaign; Battle of Dombås †
- Awards: War Cross with sword
- Other work: Farmer

Eiliv Austlid (6 May 1899 – 15 April 1940) was a Norwegian farmer and army officer who played a pivotal role in assuring the escape of the Norwegian government during the German invasion in 1940. Killed in action, he was discredited during and following the war, but his record was restored as a result of a series of articles in the newspaper Dagningen. In 2010, he received posthumously the War Cross with Sword, Norway's highest military decoration for valor.

== Biography ==
Austlid's father was a folk high school principal from Gausdal Municipality. After completing examen artium and Non-commissioned officer education, he enrolled and completed the higher division at the Norwegian Military Academy in 1923, followed by the winter warfare division in 1923–24. In 1924 he purchased the farm Såstad Søndre in Stange Municipality. He served as an aviator scout in the Norwegian army and received infantry training. He was promoted to captain in 1938.

== Battle at Hagevollen ==
Following the invasion of Norway on April 9, 1940, the Norwegian government fled north to avoid German capture. At Dovre was the crossroads between the route to Åndalsnes on the coast and the main north–south route between Oslo and Trondheim. When the German invasion became known on April 9, Austlid was a reserve officer whose mobilization point was at Madlamoen (now KNM Harald Haarfagre) in Stavanger. Cut off by the invasion from reaching this base, he instead reported at Terningmoen, where he was assigned a reduced infantry company consisting of reserve soldiers. Stationed in Hamar, he received orders a few days later to lead his troops north on a "special mission" for the Norwegian cabinet.

Once his unit had caught up with cabinet's convoy near Fåvang, he learned that their mission was to form the vanguard for the advancing convoy as it proceeded north through Gudbrandsdalen. Arriving just short of Hagevollen, situated between the villages of Dovre and Dombås, a German position was discovered ahead. In keeping with military practices of the time, Austlid advised that an infantry reconnaissance squad move ahead while the convoy waited. Trygve Lie, who at the time was Minister of Provisioning, dismissed this course of action and ordered Austlid to make a frontal attack on the position. Austlid accepted the order but mentioned to a subordinate that such mission amounted to suicide.

Meanwhile, Norwegian forces had engaged the German position with machine gun fire, which was returned with precise sniper fire. Two Norwegian soldiers were killed. Under cover of machine gun fire, Austlid and six volunteers ran 90 meters across open terrain. At 50 meters' range from the German positions, Austlid ordered his men to mount bayonets. He was himself only armed with a handgun. As they stormed up the hill toward their objective, Austlid was shot in the chest and apparently died on the spot. The assault disintegrated after that, and the convoy made a disorderly retreat southwards. Nevertheless, it was clear that Austlid's operation has secured the convoy's progress and was therefore a tactical success.

== Aftermath ==
After the war, the aforementioned Trygve Lie wrote in his memoirs that Austlid and his men had walked unawares into a German ambush, and that his actions were hasty and reckless. Lie "washed his hands" of the matter and argued rhetorically that "what could we civilians do." In an authoritative war history written by Otto Munthe-Kaas repeated this version of events, though Munthe-Kaas called for a further investigation of the matter "in fairness to Austlid and his boys."

An article series by Minda Flattum in the Norwegian regional newspaper Dagningen showed discrepancies between the official version, as reflected in Trygve Lie's memoirs, and eyewitness reports. Austlid's son Bjørnar Austlid conducted a private investigation by finding his father's brother in arms and other witnesses and found that previous accounts of combat operations had been factually misleading and libelous of captain Austlid.

An article in the journals of the historical association at Stange, the efforts of retired colonel Ulmar Wollan, and the interest of Minister of Defence Anne-Grete Strøm-Erichsen led to the restoration of Austlid's reputation. It became clear that while Trygve Lie clearly did not have the command authority he sought to impose on Austlid, Austlid nevertheless made an assault characterized by competence and courage.

On March 24, 2010, prime minister Jens Stoltenberg attended the posthumous award of the War Cross with Sword to Eiliv Austlid, represented by three of his children. This was the first time in 60 years that the medal has been awarded. The site of Austlid's assault is visible from European route E6 north of Dovre at 62.032°N 9.1689°E

On April 15, 2010, on the 70th anniversary of Austlid's death, Stange historielag (Stange historical association) published a book about Austlid's contributions, how his reputation was mistreated by historians, bureaucratic obstacles to restoring it, and how individuals succeeded in ascertaining the true facts.
