= Bottenfjellet =

Village in Stange Municipality, Norway

Bottenfjellet Åsbygda Hekne (historic)
- Village
- Interactive map of Bottenfjellet; Åsbygda
- Location within Innlandet Location within Norway
- Coordinates: 60.73995°N 11.36518°E
- Country: Norway
- Region: Eastern Norway
- County: Innlandet
- District: Hedmarken
- Municipality: Stange Municipality

Area
  - Total: 0.36 km^{2} (0.14 sq mi)
- Elevation: 286 m (938 ft)

Population (2016)
  - Total: 265
  - Density: 740/km^{2} (1,900/sq mi)
- Time zone: UTC+01:00 (CET)
  - Summer (DST): UTC+02:00 (CEST)
- Post Code: 2332 Åsvang

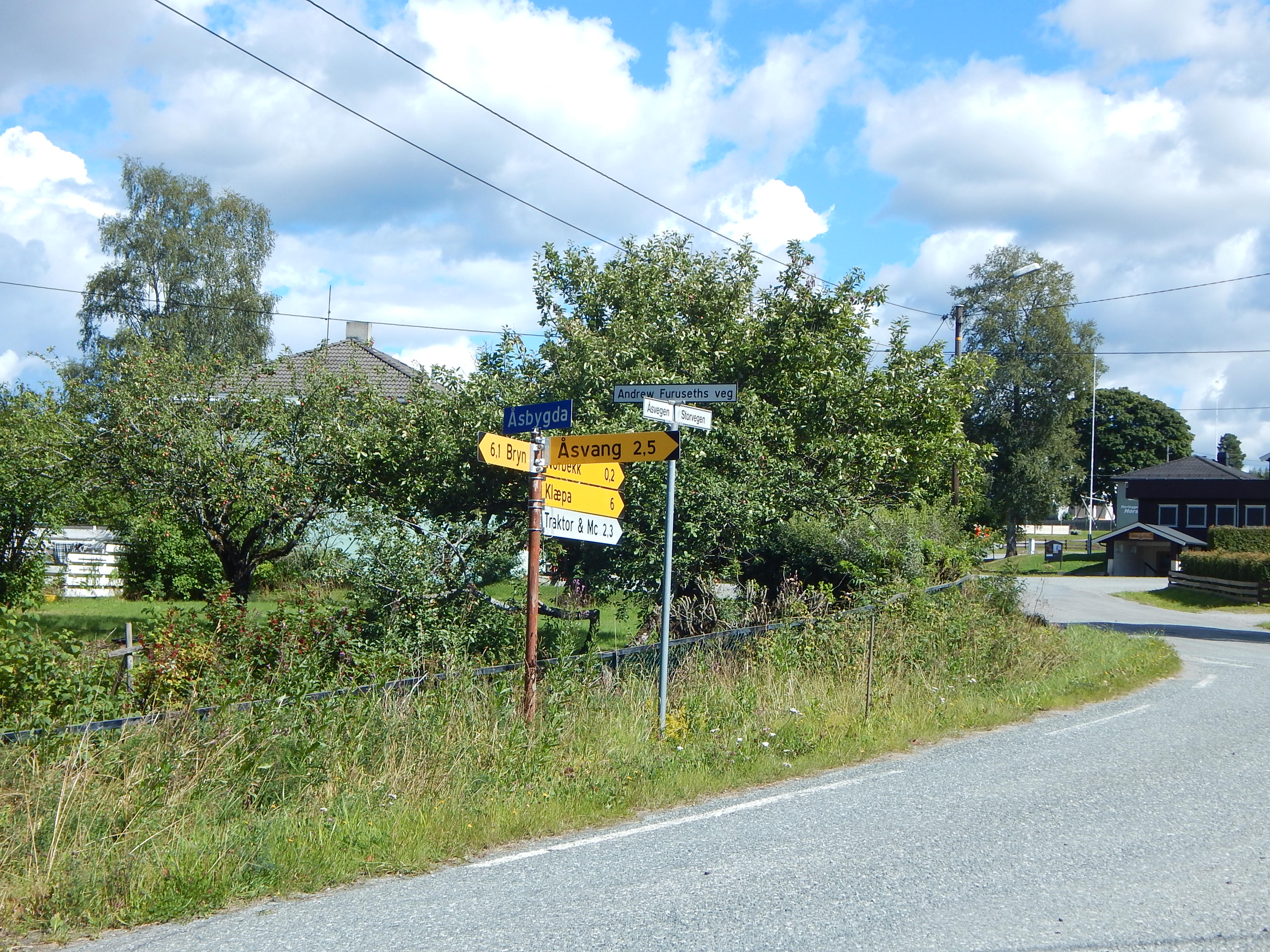
Åsbygda (Hekne) center, intersection of Andrew Furuseths veg, Storvegen, and Åsvege

Bottenfjellet or Åsbygda is a village in Stange Municipality in Innlandet county, Norway. The village is located about 4 kilometres (2.5 mi) east of the village of Romedal.

The 0.36-square-kilometre (89-acre) village had a population (2016) of 265 and a population density of 736 inhabitants per square kilometre (1,910/sq mi). Since 2016, the population and area data for this village area has not been separately tracked by Statistics Norway.
