= Tangen Station =

Railway station in Stange, Norway

Tangen
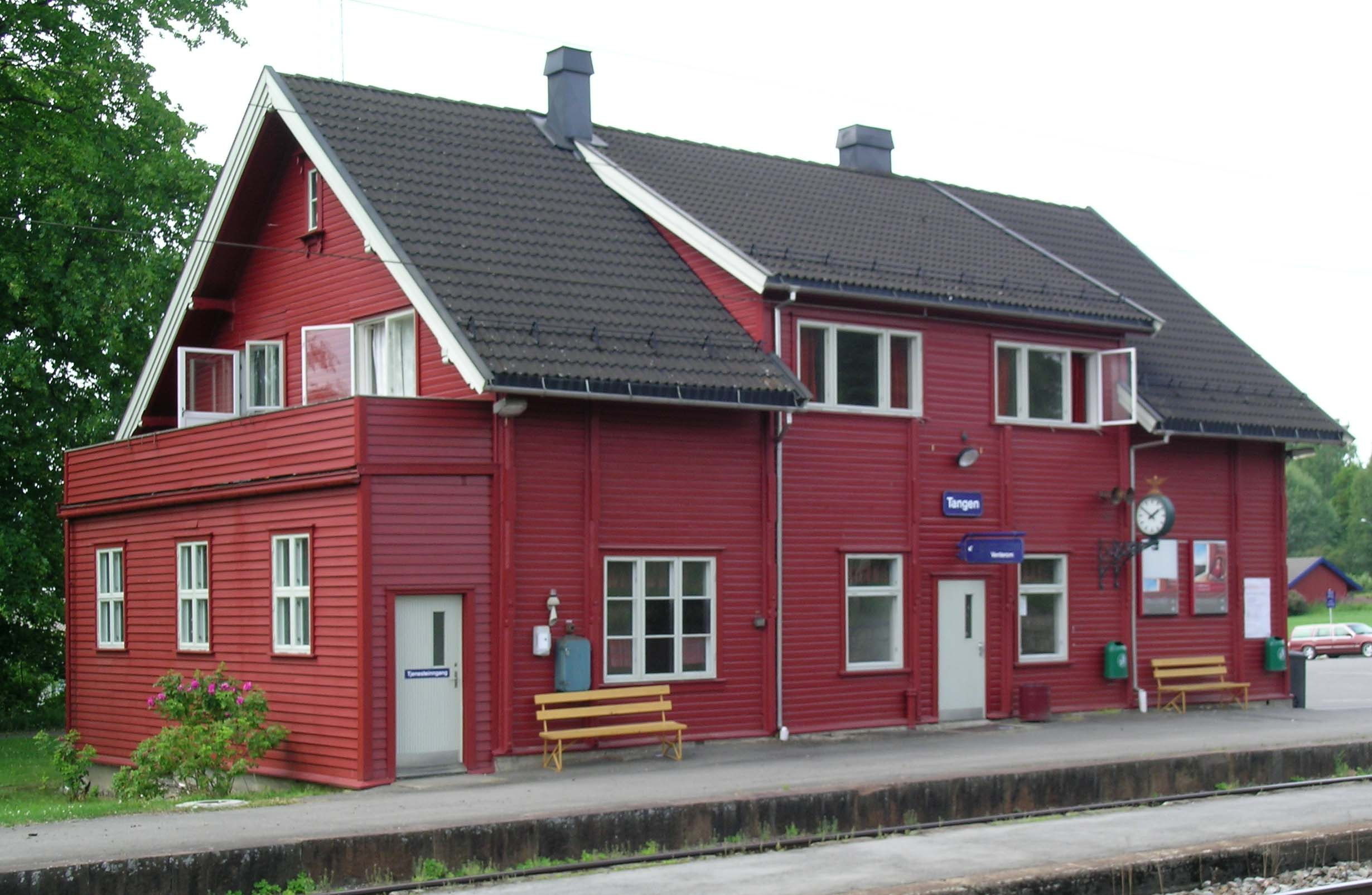

General information
- Location: Tangen, Stange Municipality; Norway
- Coordinates: 60°36′57″N 11°16′11″E
- Elevation: 164.4 m (539 ft)
- Owner: Bane NOR
- Operator: Vy
- Line: Dovre Line
- Distance: 101.77 km (63.24 mi)
- Platforms: 2
- Connections: Bus: Innlandstrafikk

History
- Opened: 1880
Location

Tangen Station (Norwegian: Tangen stasjon) is a railway station located on the Dovre Line in Tangen in Stange Municipality, Norway. The station was opened in 1880 with the construction of the railway between Eidsvoll and Hamar. Tangen is only served by regional trains operated by Vy.

Preceding station			Following station
Eidsvoll	Dovre Line		Stange
Preceding station	Regional trains		Following station
Eidsvoll	RE10	Drammen–Oslo S–Lillehammer	Stange
