= Vallset Church =

Church in Innlandet, Norway

- Vallset kirke
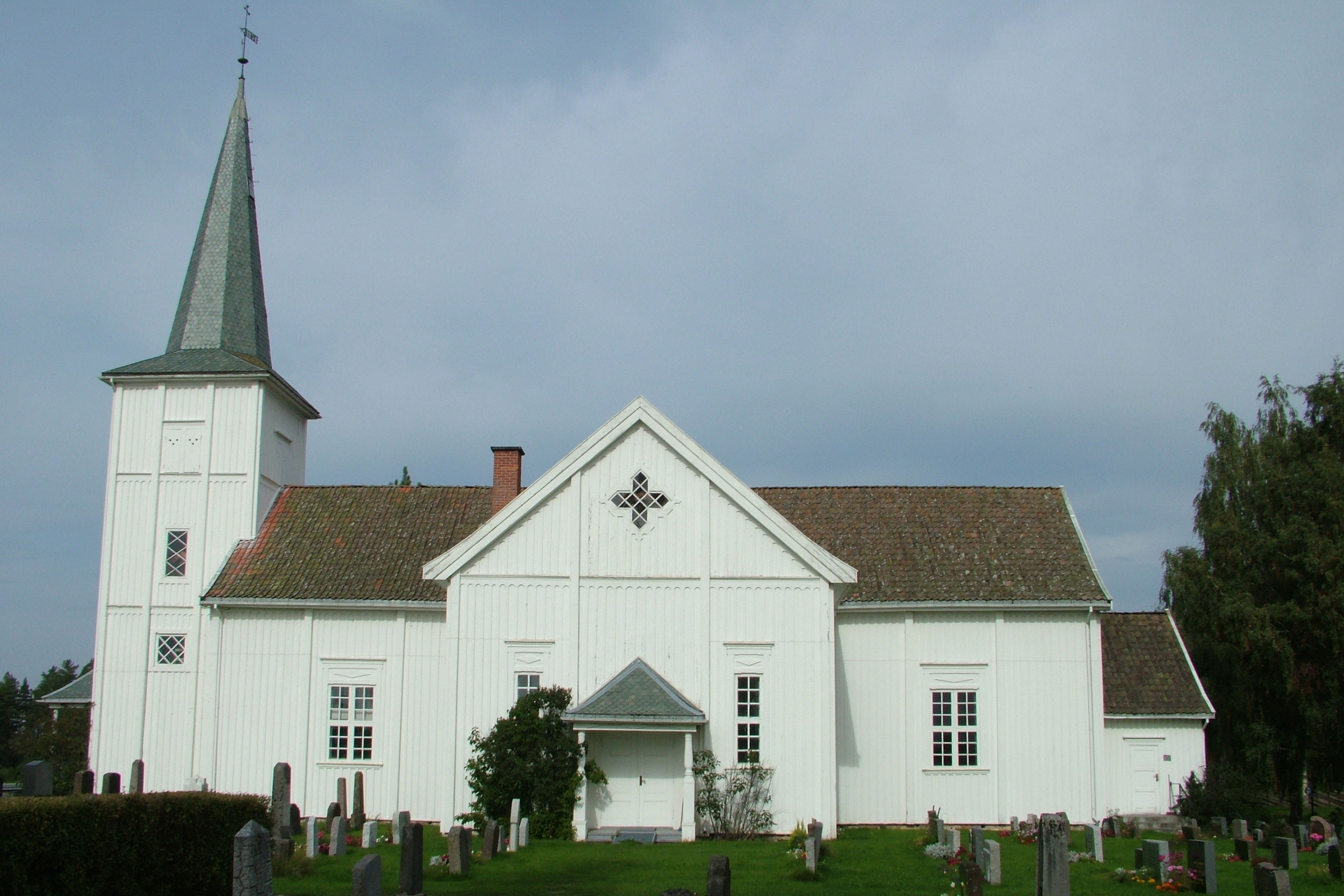
- View of the church
- Vallset Church
- 60°42′04″N 11°19′43″E
- Location: Stange Municipality, Innlandet
- Country: Norway
- Denomination: Church of Norway
- Previous denomination: Catholic Church
- Churchmanship: Evangelical Lutheran

History
- Former name: Tomter kirke
- Status: Parish church
- Founded: 16th century
- Consecrated: 25 September 1850

Architecture
- Functional status: Active
- Architect: Capt. Frisak
- Architectural type: Cruciform
- Completed: 1850 (176 years ago)

Specifications
- Capacity: 350
- Materials: Wood

Administration
- Diocese: Hamar bispedømme
- Deanery: Hamar domprosti
- Parish: Vallset
- Norwegian Cultural Heritage Site
- Type: Church
- Status: Automatically protected
- ID: 85752

Vallset Church (Norwegian: Vallset kirke) is a parish church of the Church of Norway in Stange Municipality in Innlandet county, Norway. It is located in the village of Vallset. It is the church for the Vallset parish which is part of the Hamar domprosti (deanery) in the Diocese of Hamar. The white, wooden church was built in a cruciform design in 1850 using plans drawn up by Capt. Erik Glørsen Frisak. The church seats about 350 people.

== History ==
The earliest existing historical records of the church date back to the year 1520, but that was not the year the church was built. The first church in Vallset was a wooden long church that was likely built in the early 1500s as an annex chapel to the main Romedal Church. The original church was also known as Tomter Church (Norwegian: Tomter kirke). Not much is known about this first building. By the mid-1800s, the church was in need of replacement. Captain Erik Glørsen Frisak was hired to design the new church and Thomas Aasen and Ole Bækken were hired as the lead builders. The new building was a half-timbered cruciform church with a tower on the west end. The new building was consecrated on 25 September 1850. In 1874, the church was given exterior wood paneled siding to cover up the logs used to construct the building. Also, a new spire was added to the tower. The church was restored around the year 1950. During this restoration, the timber walls were uncovered by removing the old wall paneling. Also some of the old furniture (altarpiece and pulpit) that had been hidden in the attic was moved back into the nave and chancel.

== Media gallery ==
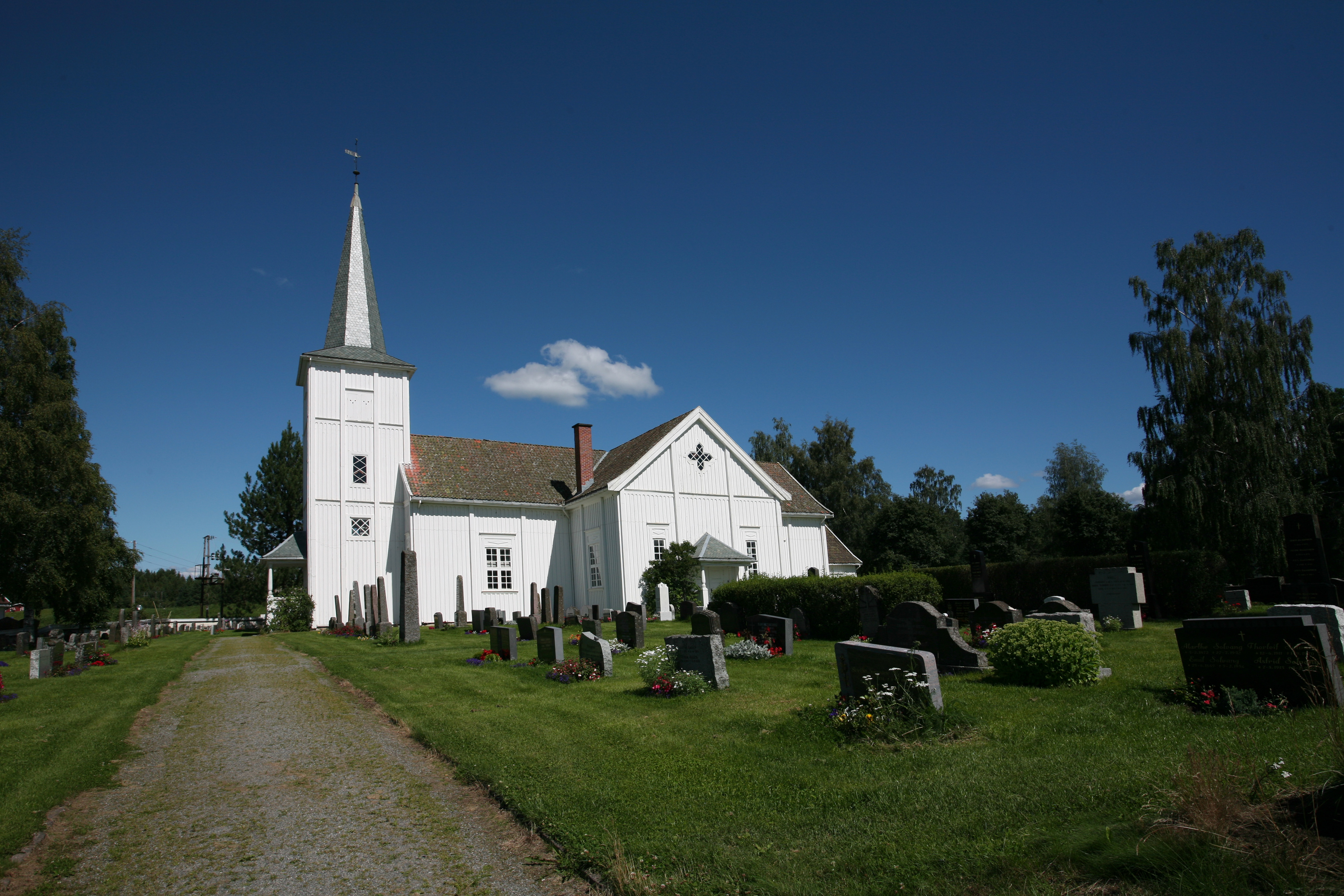

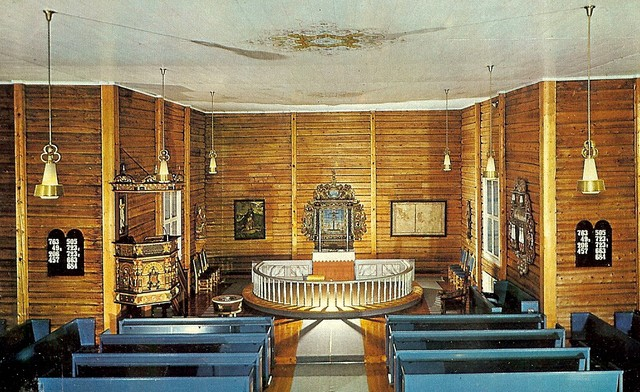

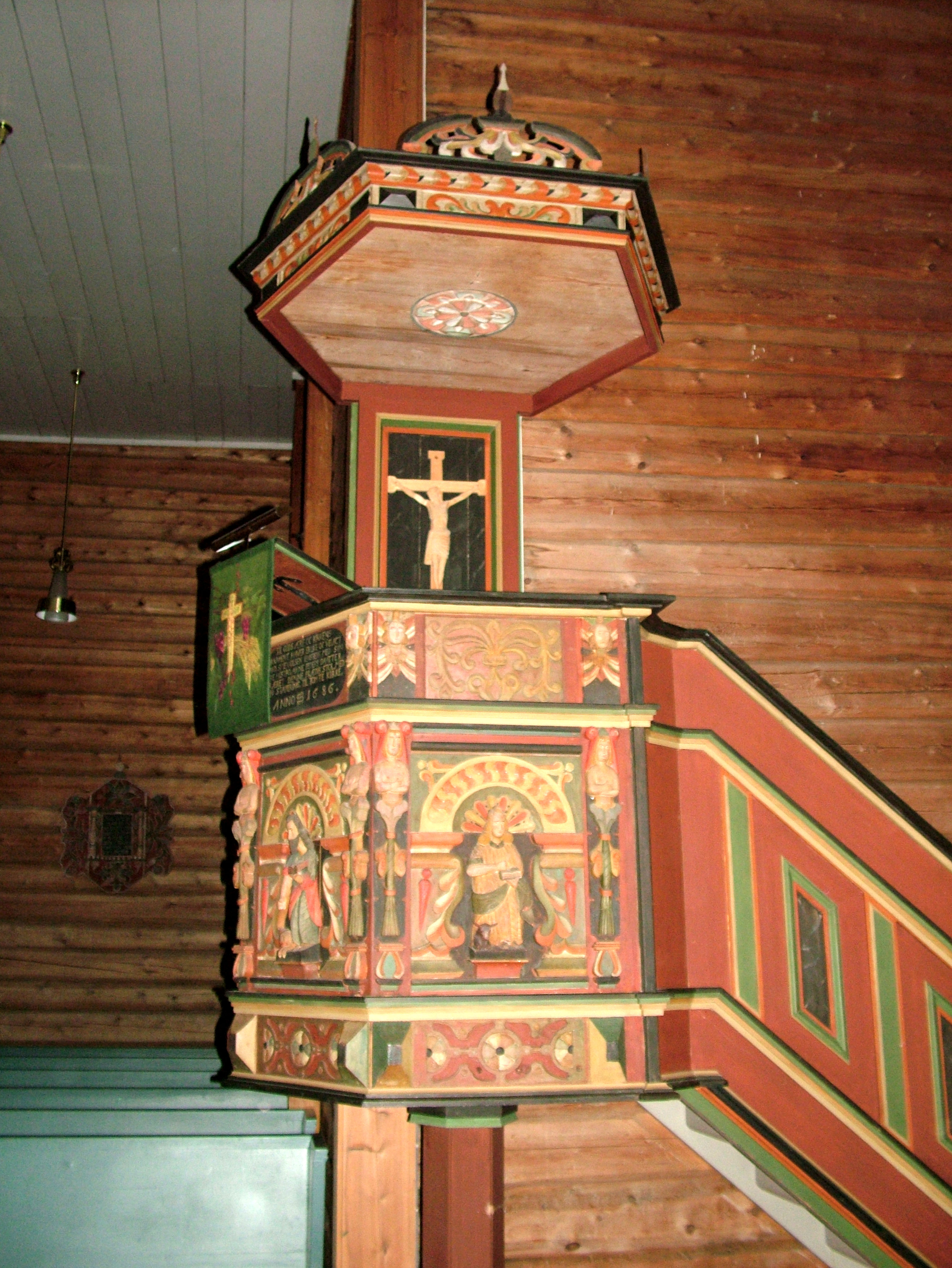

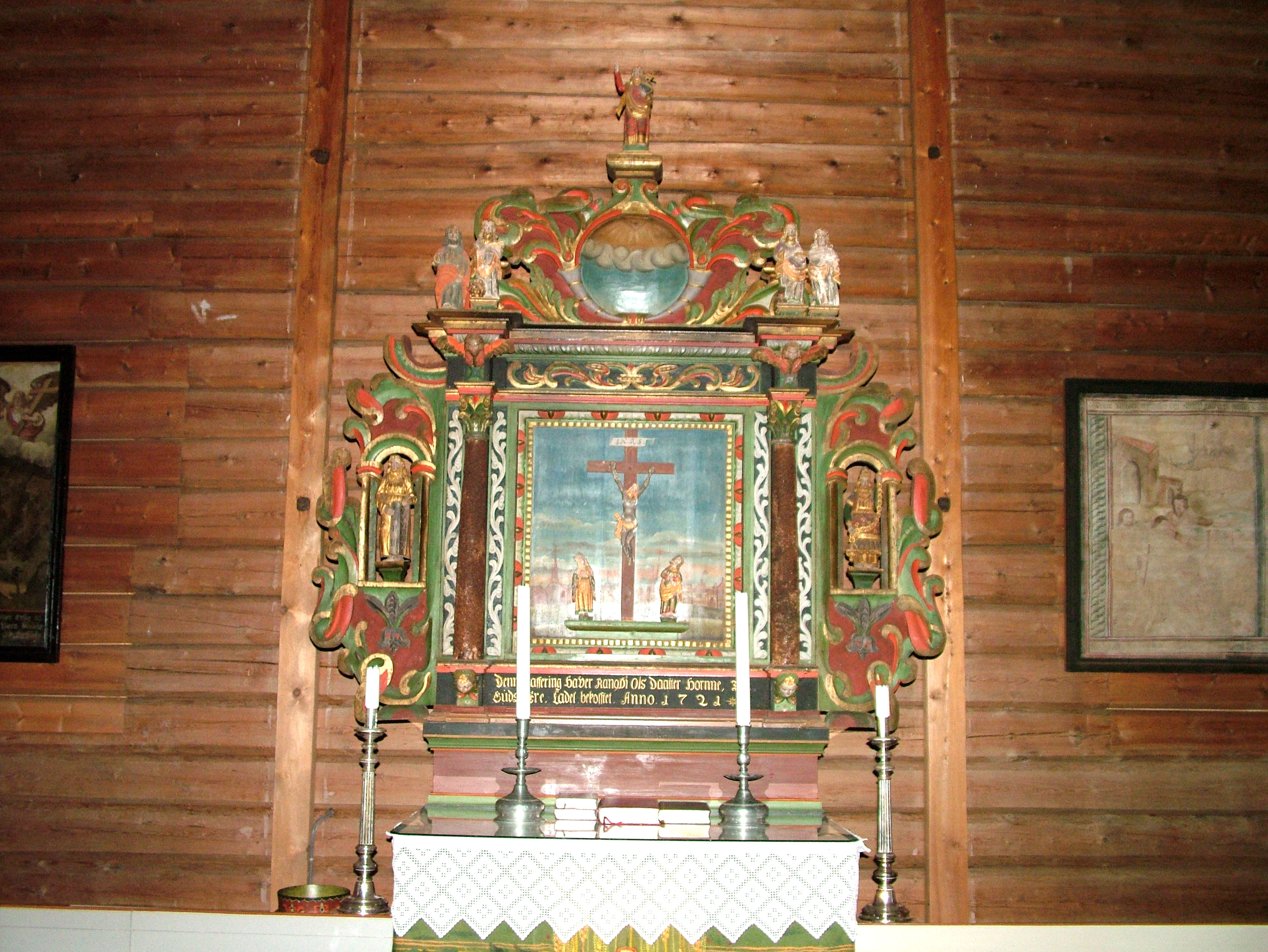

== See also ==
- List of churches in Hamar
