= Stange Station =

Railway station in Stange, Norway

Stange
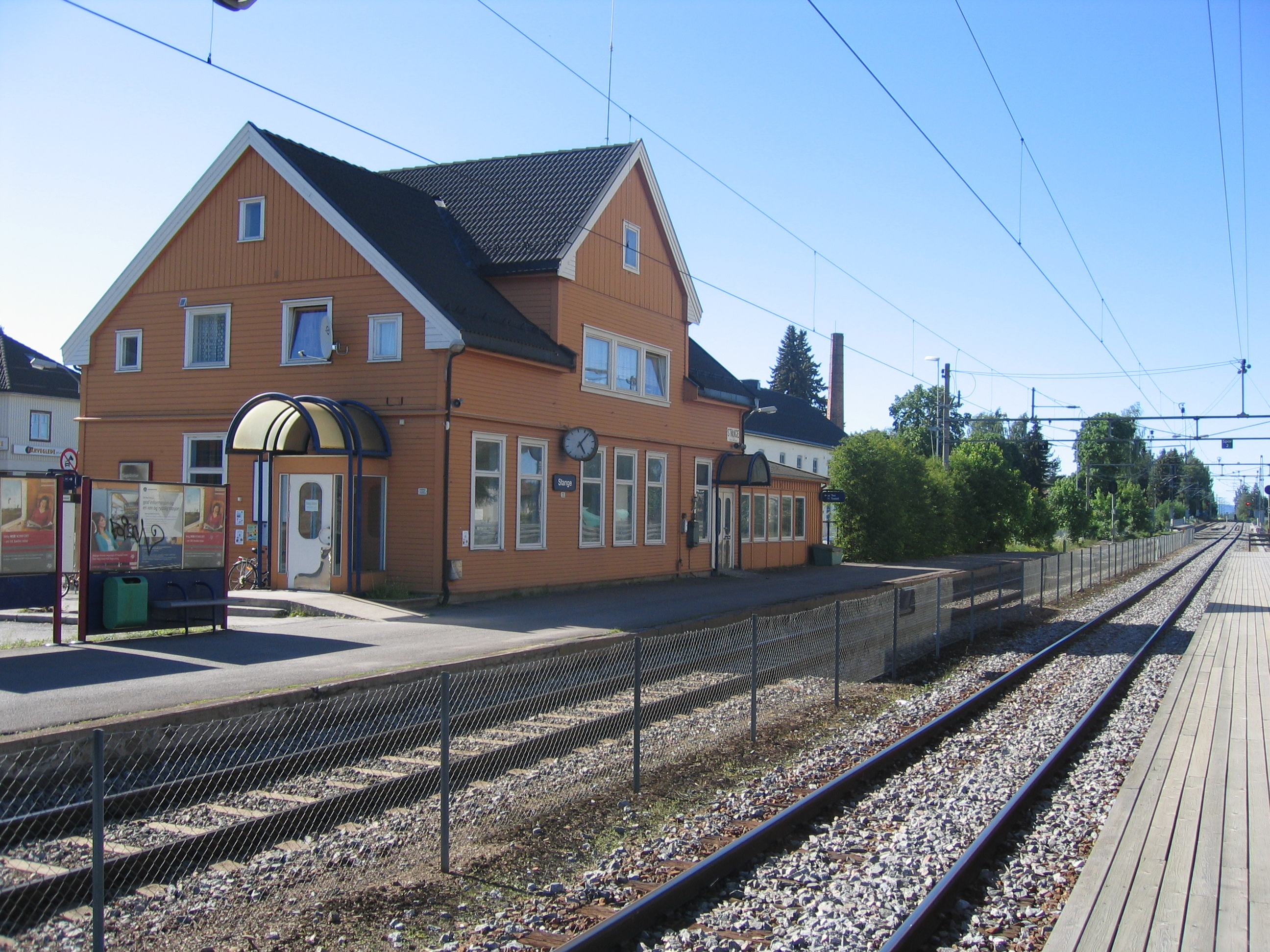

General information
- Location: Downtown Stangebyen, Stange Municipality; Norway
- Coordinates: 60°43′2″N 11°11′44″E
- Elevation: 222.4 m (730 ft)
- Owner: Bane NOR
- Operator: Vy
- Line: Dovre Line
- Distance: 114.42 km (71.10 mi)
- Platforms: 2
- Connections: Bus: Innlandstrafikk

History
- Opened: 1880
- Rebuilt: 1999
Location

Stange Station (Norwegian: Stange stasjon) is located on the Dovre Line in Stangebyen in Stange Municipality, Norway. The station was opened in 1880 with the construction of the railway between Eidsvoll and Hamar. Stange is only served by regional trains by Vy.

In 1999 the station was almost closed by the Norwegian Railway Inspectorate who required the Norwegian National Rail Administration to rebuild one of the platforms, removing a small one between track one and two, and putting in a broader one between track two and three.

Preceding station			Following station
Tangen	Dovre Line		Hamar
Preceding station	Regional trains		Following station
Tangen	RE10	Drammen–Oslo S–Lillehammer	Hamar
