= Trygve Brudevold =

Norwegian bobsledder (1920–2021)

Trygve Brudevold (19 December 1920 – 19 August 2021) was a Norwegian bobsledder who competed in the 1950s. Competing in two Winter Olympics, he earned his best finish of 11th in the four-man event at Cortina d'Ampezzo in 1956. He was born in Stange Municipality in Hedmark county. He turned 100 on 19 December 2020, and died in August 2021.
