= Christen Bang =

Christen Steffensen Bang (alternately Christen Staphensøn Bang) was born in 1584 at Aalborg, Denmark and died 1678 in Christiania. He was a Danish–Norwegian priest and theological writer, who established Norway's first printing-house, and wrote the first description of Christiania (currently Oslo).

Christen Bang was the son of a merchant. He took baccalaureus degree at the University of Copenhagen in 1612. He was ordained in 1614 and appointed as chaplain of Solum Church near Skien. In 1621 he became pastor at Romedal Church near Hamar, Norway, where he served until he resigned in 1657 after 36 years of service. He then moved to Christiania, where he died as an indigent in the Oslo hospital at approximately 95 years of age.

Although a Lutheran pastor, Bang is primarily known for his contributions as a theological writer and publisher. He was the first to write a description of Christiania, Christiania Stads Beskrivelse, in 1651. Despite the subject, the work incorporates more devotional scripture than actual topographical description. He also wrote a book of sermons, Postilla catechetica, in eight volumes including nearly 9,000 pages. Sermons Catechetica is a commentary on Luther's Small Catechism. In order publish these works, he established the first printing-house in Norway. At his request, Tyge Nielssøn moved from Copenhagen to Christiania in 1643 to serve as printer. This historic initial Norwegian printing press lasted only one year, but in 1646 Berg established a branch of the Melchior Marzan printing-house from Copenhagen in Christiania. In total, Bang will spend over 7000 Norwegian speciedaler in the printing of books.

Bang's press is also noted for printing the Aggerhus-Acter which provided independent accounts of the ongoing Gyldenløve War with Sweden.
