= Tangen =

Village in Stange Municipality, Norway

- Village
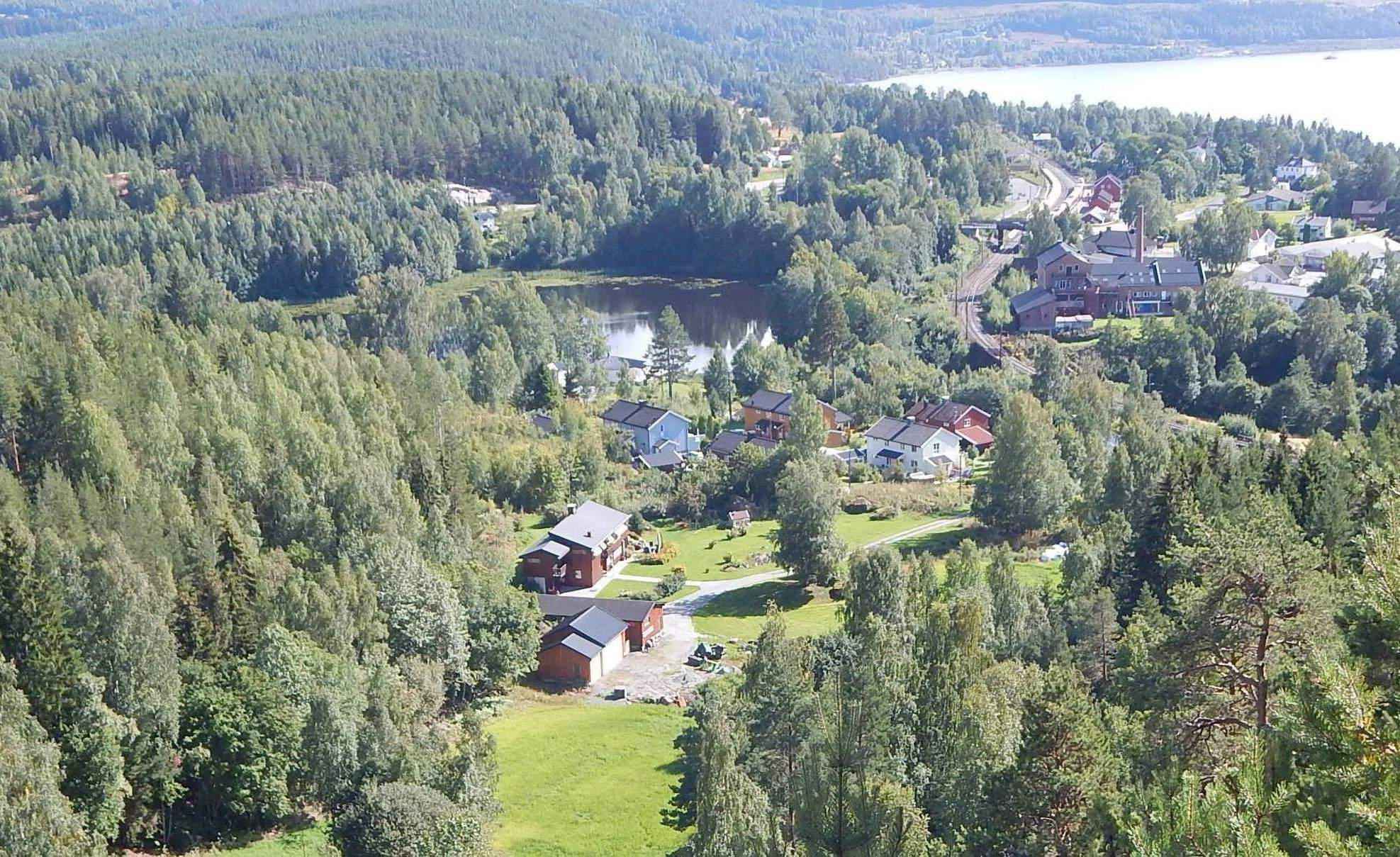
- View of the village seen from the nearby Gjellberget
- Interactive map of Tangen
- Location within Innlandet Location within Norway
- Coordinates: 60.61792°N 11.26674°E
- Country: Norway
- Region: Eastern Norway
- County: Innlandet
- District: Hedmarken
- Municipality: Stange Municipality

Area
  - Total: 0.58 km^{2} (0.22 sq mi)
- Elevation: 166 m (545 ft)

Population (2024)
  - Total: 511
  - Density: 881/km^{2} (2,280/sq mi)
- Time zone: UTC+01:00 (CET)
  - Summer (DST): UTC+02:00 (CEST)
- Post Code: 2337 Tangen

Tangen is a village in Stange Municipality in Innlandet county, Norway. The village is located near the shores of the large lake Mjøsa, about 12 kilometres (7.5 mi) south of the village of Stangebyen. The small village of Espa lies about 5 kilometres (3.1 mi) to the south of Tangen.

The 0.58-square-kilometre (140-acre) village has a population (2024) of 511 and a population density of 881 inhabitants per square kilometre (2,280/sq mi).

The Dovrebanen railway line runs through the village, stopping at Tangen Station. The European route E6 highway runs along the east side of Tangen.

== Notable people ==
- Odvar Nordli, a former Prime Minister of Norway who was born and raised in Tangen
