= Nils A. Røhne =

Norwegian politician (1949–2022)

Nils Amund Røhne (20 April 1949 – 10 January 2022) was a Norwegian politician for the Labour Party.

== Life and career ==
Røhne was born in Stange Municipality on 20 April 1949. From 1994 to 1996, during the third cabinet Brundtland, Røhne was appointed political advisor in the Ministry of Administration. From 1996 to 1997, during the cabinet Jagland, he was appointed State Secretary in the Ministry of Trade. He served as a deputy representative to the Norwegian Parliament from Nord-Trøndelag during the terms 1997–2001, 2001–2005 and 2005–2009.

On the local level Røhne was a member of the executive committee of the municipal council for Stange Municipality from 1983 to 1987, later serving as mayor from 2007. He chaired the county party chapter from 1998 to 2001.

Outside politics he has the cand.philol. degree in history, from the University of Oslo 1986. He worked as a research fellow at the Norwegian Institute for Defence Studies from 1987 to 1993. From 1997 to 1998 he was a counsellor for the Research Council of Norway, and from 1998 he was director of foreign affairs in Norwegian People's Aid. He died in Stange on 10 January 2022, at the age of 72.
