= Eskil Rønningsbakken =

Eskil Rønningsbakken (born 24 June 1979) is an extreme artist from Vallset in Stange Municipality, Norway. Rønningsbakken travels the world performing balancing acts at the tops of lethal drops, such as canyons and cliffs. His feats include tightrope walking between two hot air balloons in flight and doing a handstand on a pile of chairs balanced on a rock wedged in a crevice between two cliffs that were 3,500 feet tall. He practices yoga, meditation, and breathing techniques to stay focused, and prepares extensively for each act.

Rønningsbakken joined the circus at the age of 12, but has been practicing in various forms since the age of five, where, as the youngest of three children, he spent his time in the Norwegian countryside climbing trees and playing on rooftops. At an early age, when watching television, he was inspired by footage of an Indian yogi balancing, and decided to devote himself to the art. He later improved his craft under the tutelage of Moscow State Circus trainer Peter Jakob. He has also begun to teach others his techniques. Rønningsbakken has visited the slums of Nairobi in the hopes of inspiring lifelong confidence in the youth by teaching them acrobatics.

Rønningsbakken’s current goal is to perform a one-handed handstand at the top of the Burj Khalifa in Dubai, which, as of January 2010, was the tallest man-made structure ever built. Explaining his motives, he says, "When you only have five fingers touching the building, you feel like you are flying." Experts expect wind speed will affect his ability to perform safely, as the building sways slightly in high winds.
