= Stange (surname) =

Stange is a surname. Notable people with the surname include:

- Bernd Stange (born 1948), German football manager
- Daniel Stange (born 1985), American baseball player
- Howie Stange (1924–1990), American musician
- Hugh Stanislaus Stange (1894–1966), American playwright
- Iekeliene Stange (born 1984), Dutch fashion model
- Janne Stange (born 1986), Norwegian football defender
- Julia-Christina Stange (born 1978), German politician
- Lee Stange (1936–2018), former Major League Baseball player
- Mary Zeiss Stange (1950–2024), American academic
- Rodolfo Stange (1925–2023), Chilean politician
- Stanislaus Stange (1862–1917), Anglo-American lyricist and playwright
- Ulrike Stange (born 1984), German handball player
- Ute Stange (born 1966), German rower
