= Romedal Church =

Church in Innlandet, Norway

- Romedal kirke
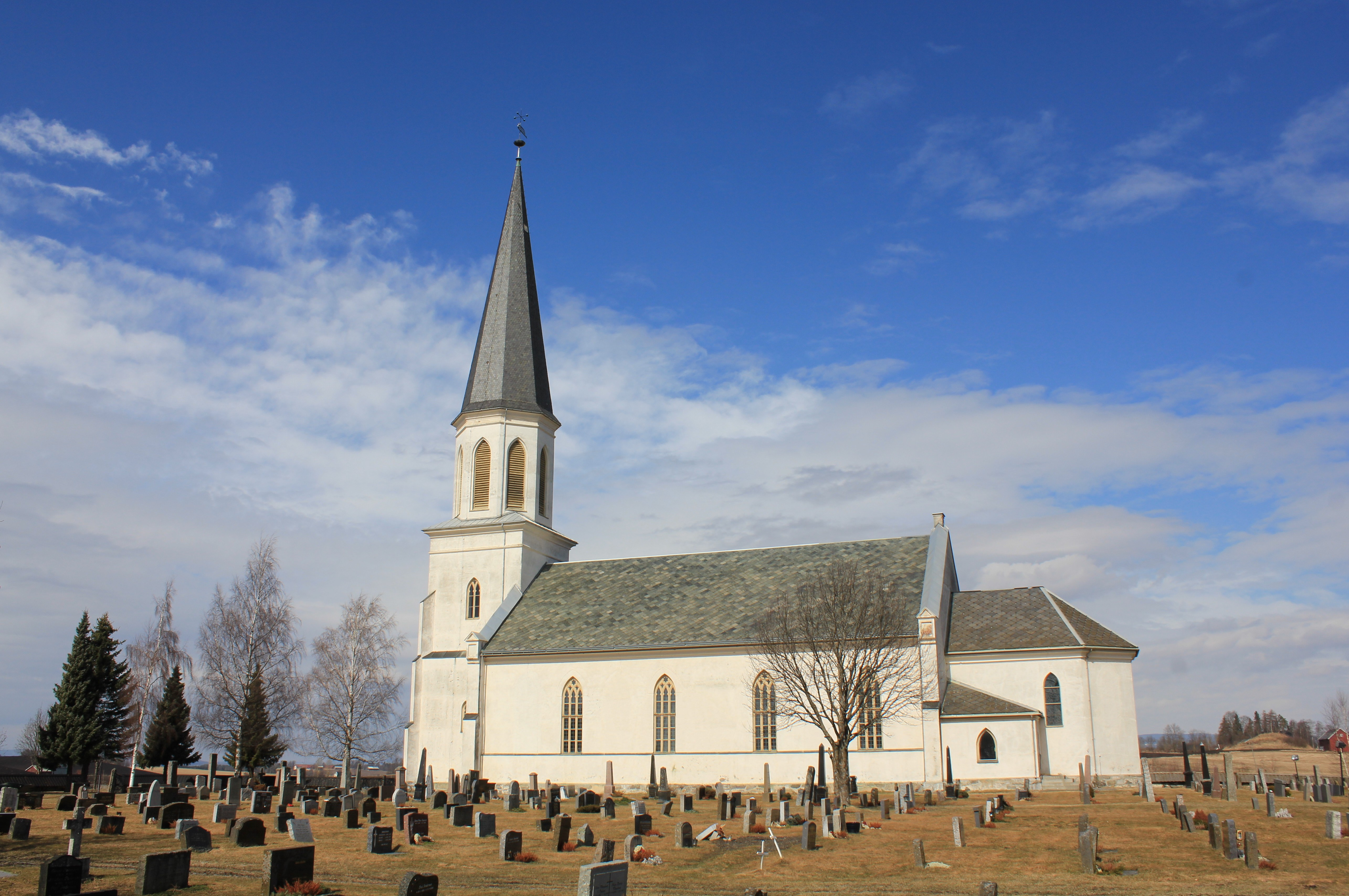
- View of the church Credit: Øyvind Holmstad
- Romedal Church
- 60°45′06″N 11°15′41″E
- Location: Stange Municipality, Innlandet
- Country: Norway
- Denomination: Church of Norway
- Previous denomination: Catholic Church
- Churchmanship: Evangelical Lutheran

History
- Status: Parish church
- Founded: 12th century
- Consecrated: 23 November 1887

Architecture
- Functional status: Active
- Architect: Günther Schüssler
- Architectural type: Long church
- Style: Neo-Gothic
- Completed: 1887 (139 years ago)

Specifications
- Capacity: 440
- Materials: Stone

Administration
- Diocese: Hamar bispedømme
- Deanery: Hamar domprosti
- Parish: Romedal
- Norwegian Cultural Heritage Site
- Type: Church
- Status: Protected
- ID: 85313

Romedal Church (Norwegian: Romedal kirke) is a parish church of the Church of Norway in Stange Municipality in Innlandet county, Norway. It is located about 1 kilometre (0.62 mi) northwest of the village of Romedal. It is the church for the Romedal parish which is part of the Hamar domprosti (deanery) in the Diocese of Hamar. The white, stone church was built in a long church design in 1887 using plans drawn up by the architect Günther Schüssler. The church seats about 440 people.

== History ==
The first church in Romedal was a stone building that was likely built during the 12th century. It has been referred to as "perhaps the first Gothic stone church on Hedmark". The arched opening between the nave and the tower suggests that the church was built in the 12th century, while the pointed arches in most of the church's window openings point to major alterations which probably took place around the middle of the 13th century. The church had a rectangular nave that measured 14.8 by 11.5 metres (49 ft × 38 ft) and a square choir that measured about 7.2 by 7.2 metres (24 ft × 24 ft). There was a church porch with a tower on the west end of the nave. The church was dedicated to Saint Peter and so the church was known historically as St. Peter's Church (Norwegian: Peterskirken). The building was constructed near a small river and its location and foundation had some problems over the centuries. The ground upon which the church was built was quite susceptible to significant frost heaving. Shortly before the year 1700, the church tower was in such bad shape to structural problems that the bells were taken down and put in a casting pool. By 1732 the church was in very poor condition and that same year, the tower was struck by lightning and heavily damaged. The tower was then demolished and a new tower erected.

In 1814, this church served as an election church (Norwegian: valgkirke). Together with more than 300 other parish churches across Norway, it was a polling station for elections to the 1814 Norwegian Constituent Assembly which wrote the Constitution of Norway. This was Norway's first national elections. Each church parish was a constituency that elected people called "electors" who later met together in each county to elect the representatives for the assembly that was to meet at Eidsvoll Manor later that year.

Throughout the 19th century, the church continued to fall into disrepair. After the bishop's visit in 1881, an engineering report was prepared which left little doubt that something drastic had to be done because the church structure was a significant problem. The municipal council for Romedal Municipality began looking into costs for the renovation of the church, but it was eventually determined that it would be cheaper to build a new church. On 18 December 1885, the council voted to tear down the old church and replace it with a new church on the same site. Soon after, Günther Schüssler was hired to design a new church. On 4 July 1886, the old church held its last worship service. Soon afterwards, the old church was torn down. Any of the salvageable materials were saved for reuse in the new building. The new church was a neo-Gothic long church built out of stone and covered with white plaster. The new church has a main nave seating about 440 people. There is a choir flanked by two sacristies on the east end of the nave and a church porch and tower on the west end of the nave. The new building was consecrated by Bishop Arnoldus Hille on 23 November 1887.

=== Priests ===
Kristen Steffensen Bang was the priest at Romedal in 1643, when he joined with Kjeld Stub to set up the first printing press in Norway, located in Oslo. Pastor Bang wrote copiously to feed his printing press and died a pauper in 1678 at the age of 98. The press is most famous for printing the Aggerhus-Acter which were accounts of the progress of the ongoing Gyldenløve War with Sweden.

Lists of the priests for Romedal Church

- –1545 Anders
- 1552 Bernt Paulsen
- 1552–1565 Erik Mogensen
- 1565–1584 Tore Olsen Hummer
- 1584–1618 Kjeld Torgersen
- 1621–1655 Christen Steffensen Bang
- 1657–1665 Nils Christensen Hover
- 1665–1674 Johan Borchardsen Madfeld
- 1674–1724 Isak Andersen Cold

...

- –1825 Peter Grüner Mandall (1749–1829)
- 1826–1852 Ole Christian Sang (1778–1852)
- 1853–1864 August Thorvald Deinboll (1810–1900)
- 1864–1871 Christian Bastholm Heltberg (1809–1871)
- 1872– Wilhelm Julius Just Gedde (1818–?)

...

- –2006 Anne Marie Dahl Mustard

== Media gallery ==
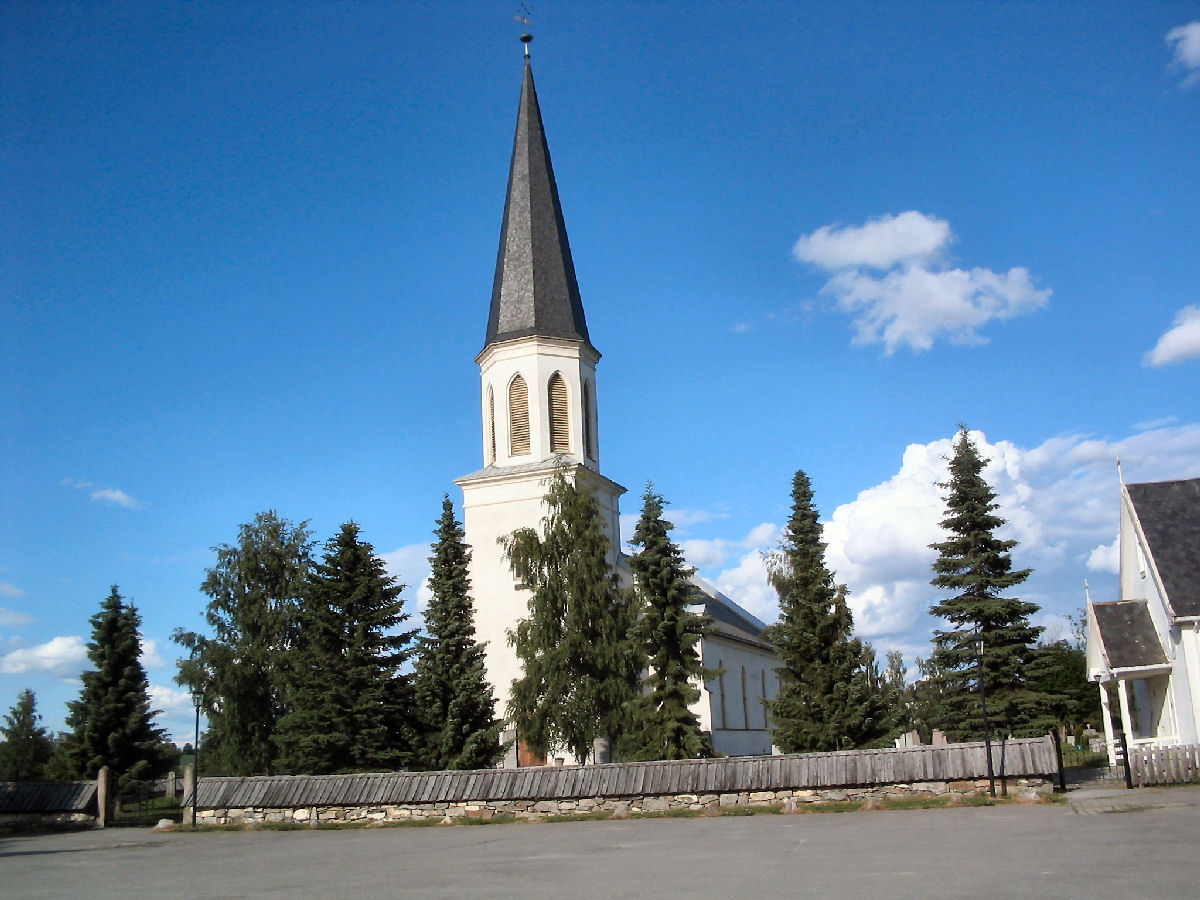
View of the present church

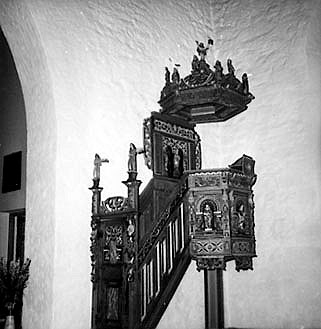
Pulpit

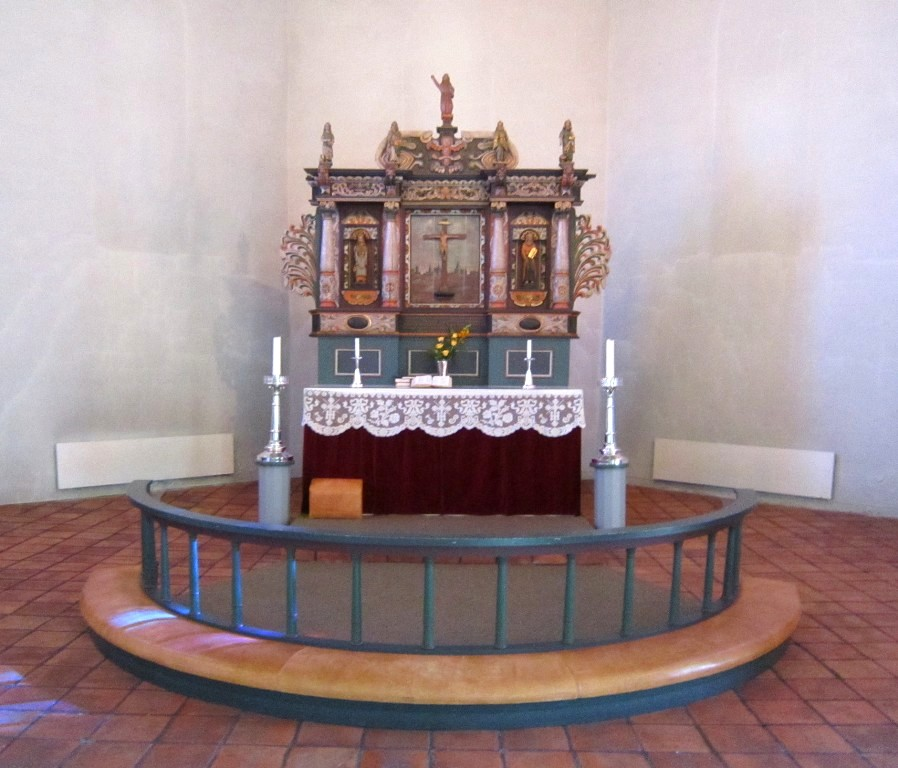
Altar table

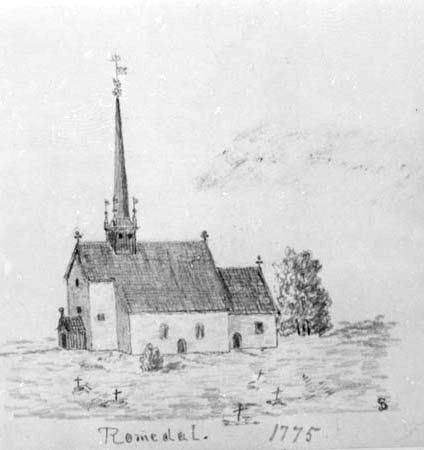
Painting of the old church (c. 1775)

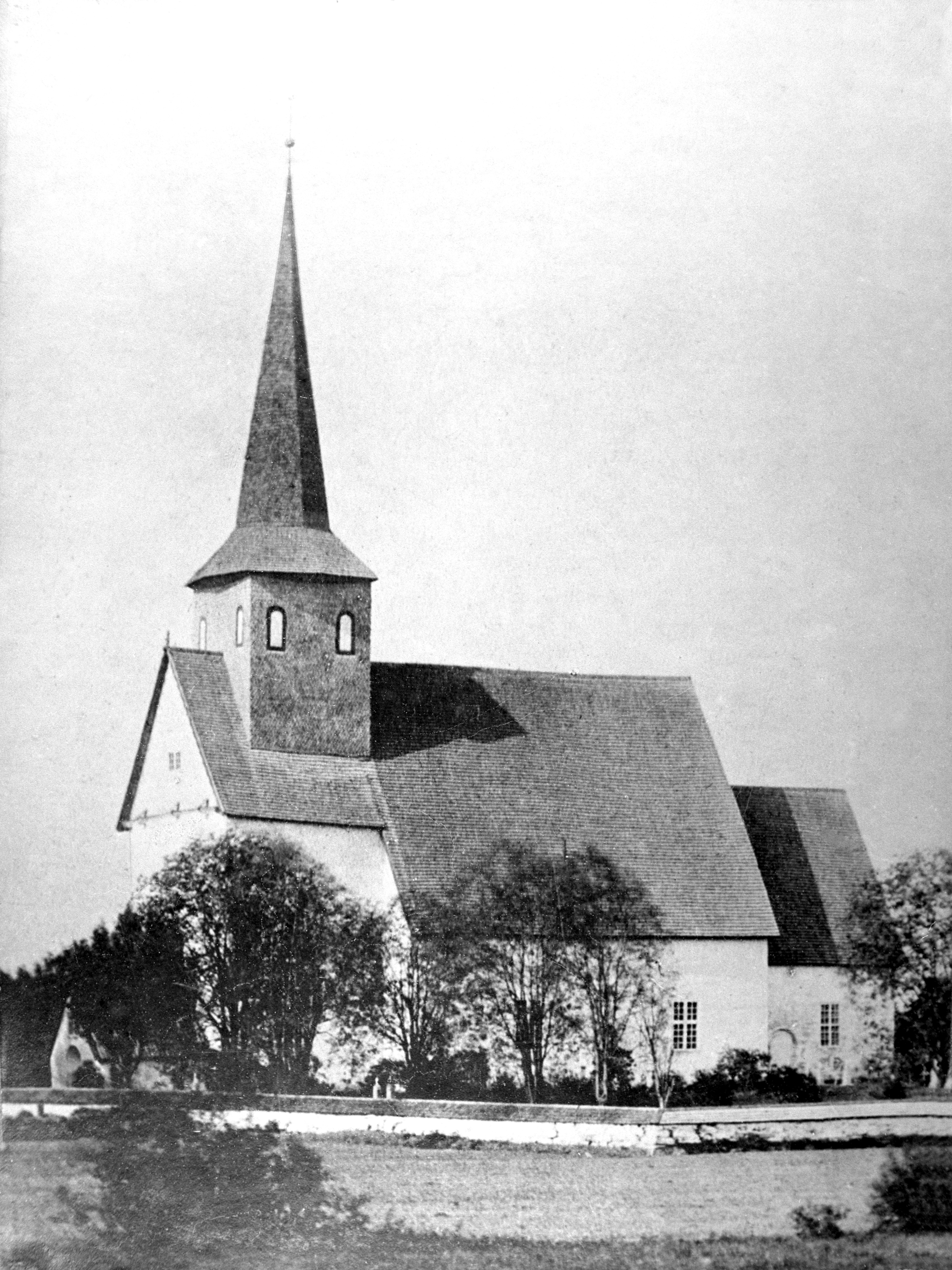
Photo of the old church shortly before its demolition in 1886

== See also ==
- List of churches in Hamar
