= Stange Commons =

Coordinates: 60°29′06″N 11°18′53″E

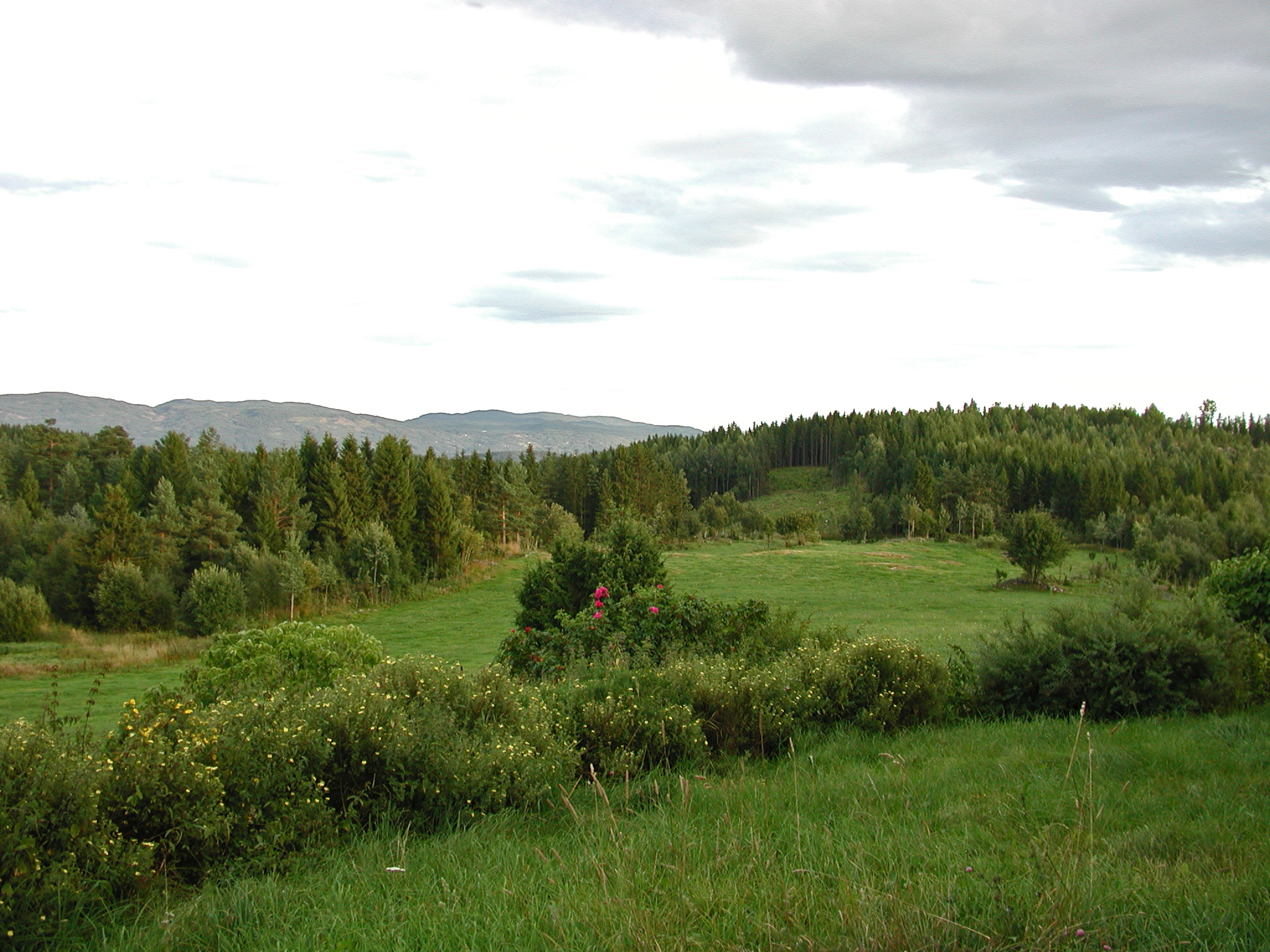
The craggy, forested commons of Stange

Stange Commons (Norwegian: Stange almenning) is a municipal commons in the southern part of Stange Municipality in Innlandet county, Norway. The common area stretches from the lake Mjøsa eastward to the traditional district of Odalen (the modern municipalities of Sør-Odal and Nord-Odal).

The Stange Commons and the neighboring Romedal Commons (in the old Romedal Municipality; now part of Stange Municipality) are municipal commons located adjacent to one another in east-central Innlandet county. The boundaries of the commons stretch from the Akershus county border in the south, along lake Mjøsa to the west, to the city of Hamar in the west and north and to Solør in the east. The Romedal Commons has a total area of 2,450 square kilometres (950 sq mi) and the Stange Commons has a total area of 1,250 square kilometres (480 sq mi).

== History ==
In 1668, King Frederik III sold the Stange common area to chief district judge Nils Toller, who was interested in the lumber rights, with right of redemption by the king (see Odelsrett). On 29 August 1759, records show that it was auctioned and the king's right of redemption was exercised. King Christian VII again sold an area amounting to much of the current commons on 8 January 1789 to the Anker family for 15,155 Dano-Norwegian rigsdalers. The Anchors lumber business suffered economic setbacks and they sold it at auction along with the Morskogen and 17 lesser locations for 5,000 Norwegian speciedaler to settle encumbrances in 1822. It was purchased by the majority of the residents of Stange (112 farms) for use as a public commons. All the registered Stange farms except the priests farm, the church farm of Lundgård, the residence of Kjemstad, and the farm of Huse participated in the purchase and received the rights to use the commons. More land has been purchased and added to the commons in recent years.
