= Romedal (village) =

Village in Stange Municipality, Norway

Romedal Romedal sentrum
- Village
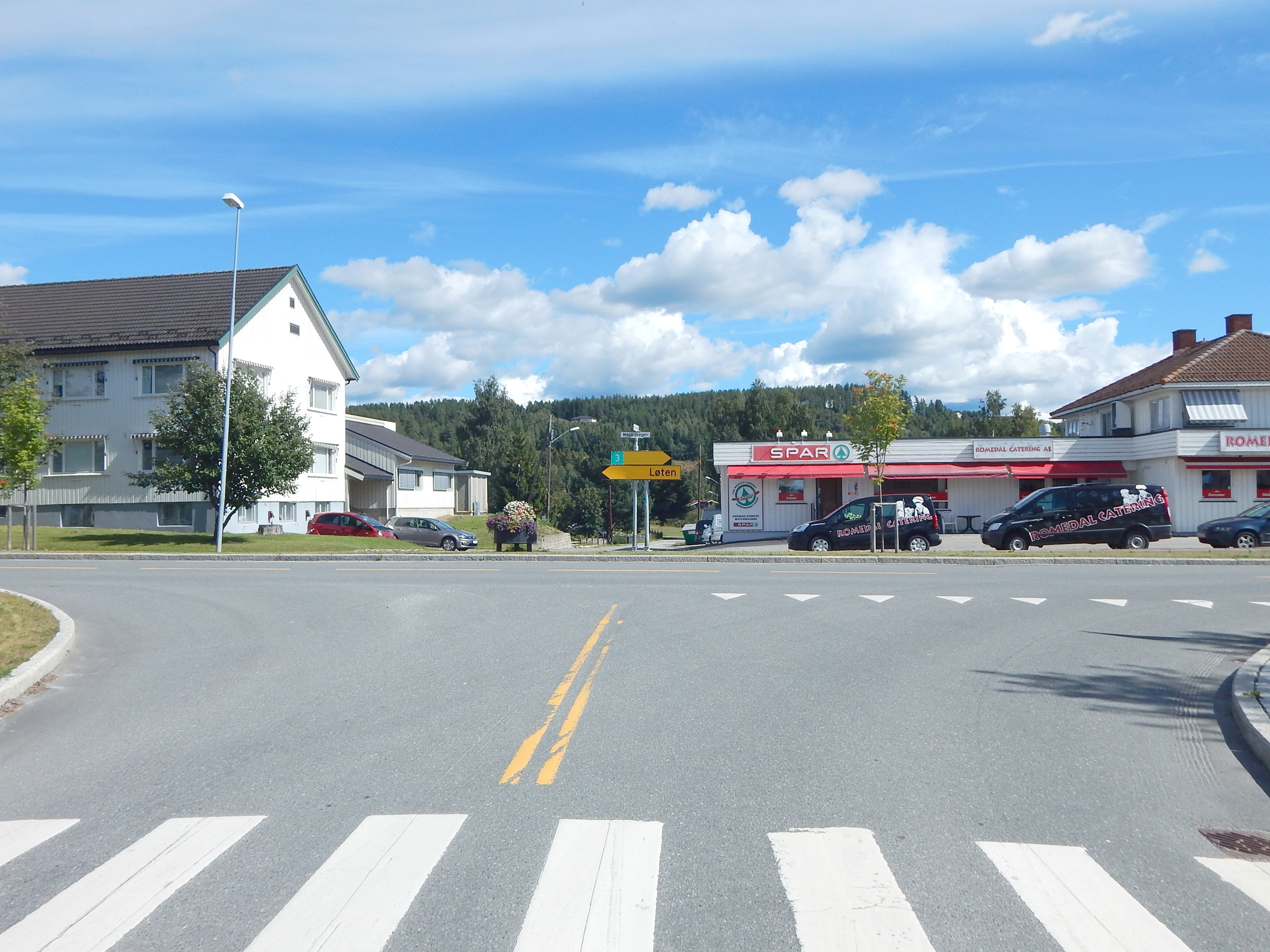
- View of the village
- Interactive map of Romedal
- Location within Innlandet Location within Norway
- Coordinates: 60.73715°N 11.29146°E
- Country: Norway
- Region: Eastern Norway
- County: Innlandet
- District: Hedemarken
- Municipality: Stange Municipality

Area
  - Total: 0.5 km^{2} (0.19 sq mi)
- Elevation: 176 m (577 ft)

Population (2024)
  - Total: 727
  - Density: 1,454/km^{2} (3,770/sq mi)
- Time zone: UTC+01:00 (CET)
  - Summer (DST): UTC+02:00 (CEST)
- Post Code: 2334 Romedal

Romedal is a village in Stange Municipality in Innlandet county, Norway. The village is located along Norwegian National Road 3 about 6 kilometres (3.7 mi) east of the village of Stangebyen and about 20 kilometres (12 mi) southeast of the town of Hamar. Romedal Church lies about 2 kilometres (1.2 mi) northwest of the centre of the village of Romedal.

The 0.5-square-kilometre (120-acre) village has a population (2024) of 727 and a population density of 1,454 inhabitants per square kilometre (3,770/sq mi).

== History ==
The village was the administrative centre of the old Romedal Municipality, which existed from 1838 to 1964.
