= Stange Municipality =

Municipality in Innlandet, Norway

Stange Municipality Stange kommune
- Municipality
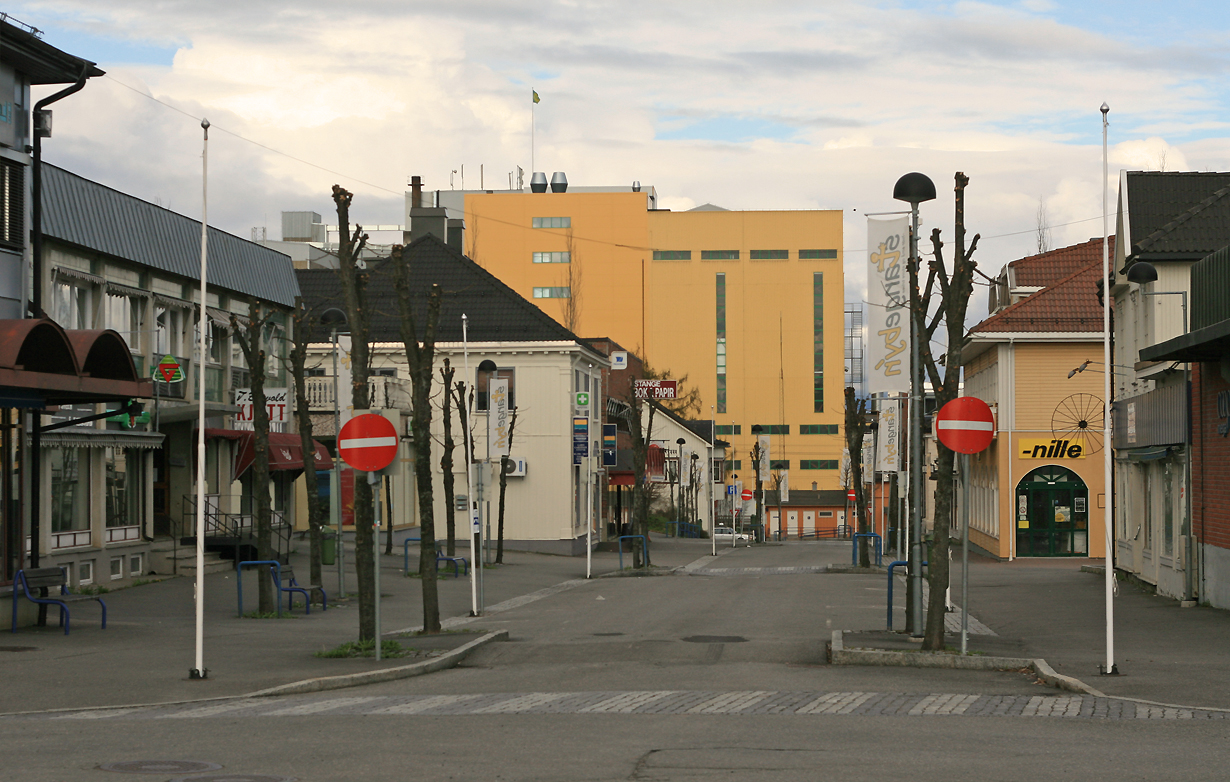
- View of the village of Stangebyen

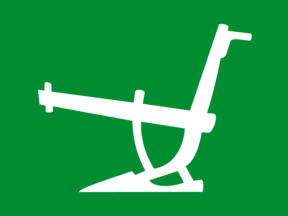
- Flag Coat of arms

- Innlandet within Norway

- Stange within Innlandet
- Coordinates: 60°42′57″N 11°11′25″E
- Country: Norway
- County: Innlandet
- District: Hedmarken
- Established: 1 January 1838
  - Created as: Formannskapsdistrikt
- Administrative centre: Stangebyen

Government
  - Mayor (2022): Bjarne Christiansen (Ap)

Area
  - Total: 724.27 km^{2} (279.64 sq mi)
  - Land: 640.99 km^{2} (247.49 sq mi)
  - Water: 83.28 km^{2} (32.15 sq mi) 11.5%
  - Rank: #157 in Norway
- Highest elevation: 642.63 m (2,108.4 ft)

Population (2025)
  - Total: 21,691
  - Rank: #60 in Norway
  - Density: 29.9/km^{2} (77/sq mi)
  - Change (10 years): ▲ +9.5%
- Demonym: Stangesokning

Official language
  - Norwegian form: Bokmål
- Time zone: UTC+01:00 (CET)
  - Summer (DST): UTC+02:00 (CEST)
- ISO 3166 code: NO-3413
- Website: Official website

Stange is a municipality in Innlandet county, Norway. It is located in the traditional district of Hedmarken. The administrative centre of the municipality is the village of Stangebyen. Other villages include Bekkelaget, Espa, Bottenfjellet, Ilseng, Ottestad, Sandvika, Sinnerud, Starhellinga, Tangen, and Romedal.

The 724-square-kilometre (280 sq mi) municipality is the 157th largest by area out of the 357 municipalities in Norway. Stange Municipality is the 60th most populous municipality in Norway with a population of 21,691. The municipality's population density is 29.5 inhabitants per square kilometre (76/sq mi) and its population has increased by 9.5% over the previous 10-year period.

== General information ==
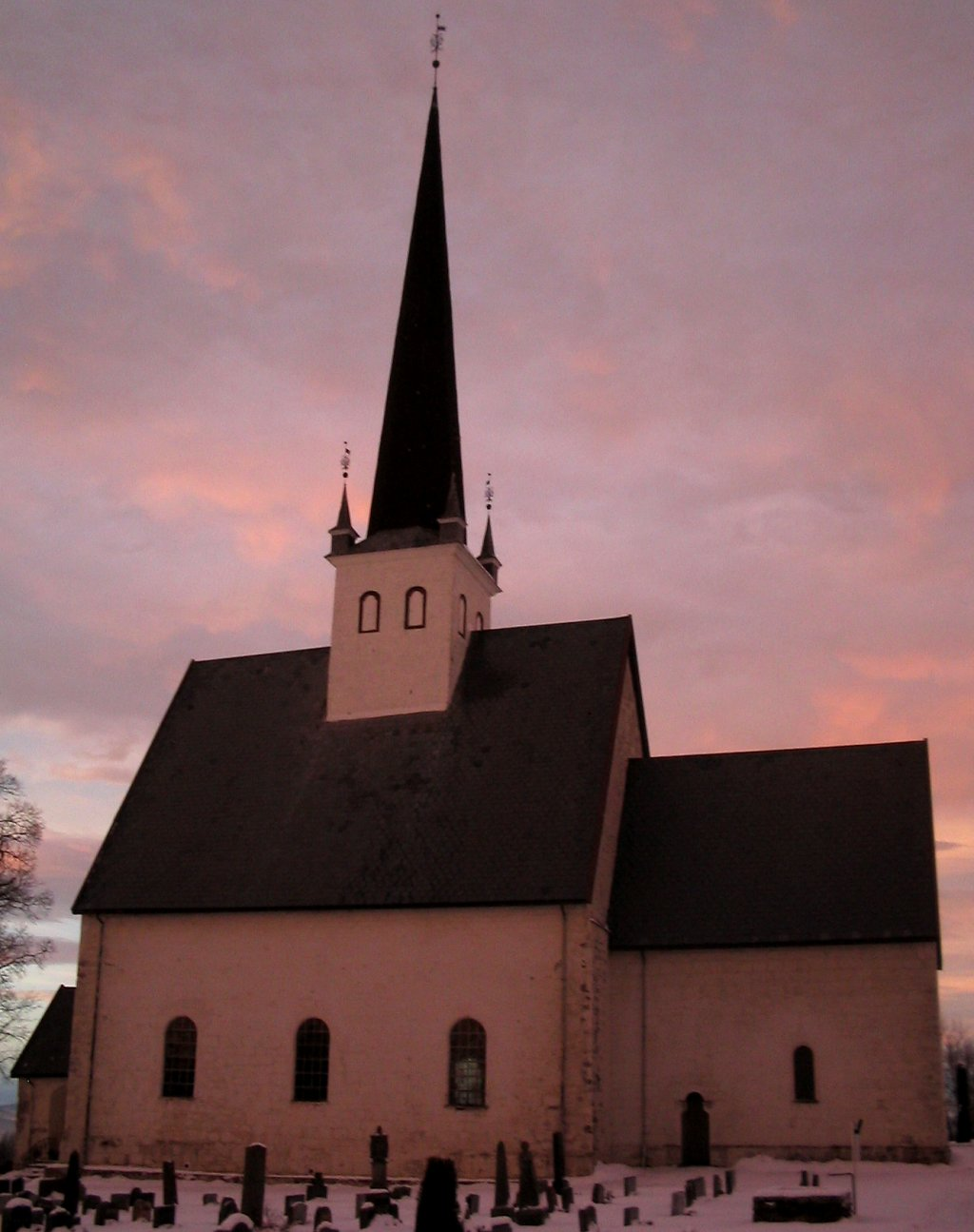
Stange Church

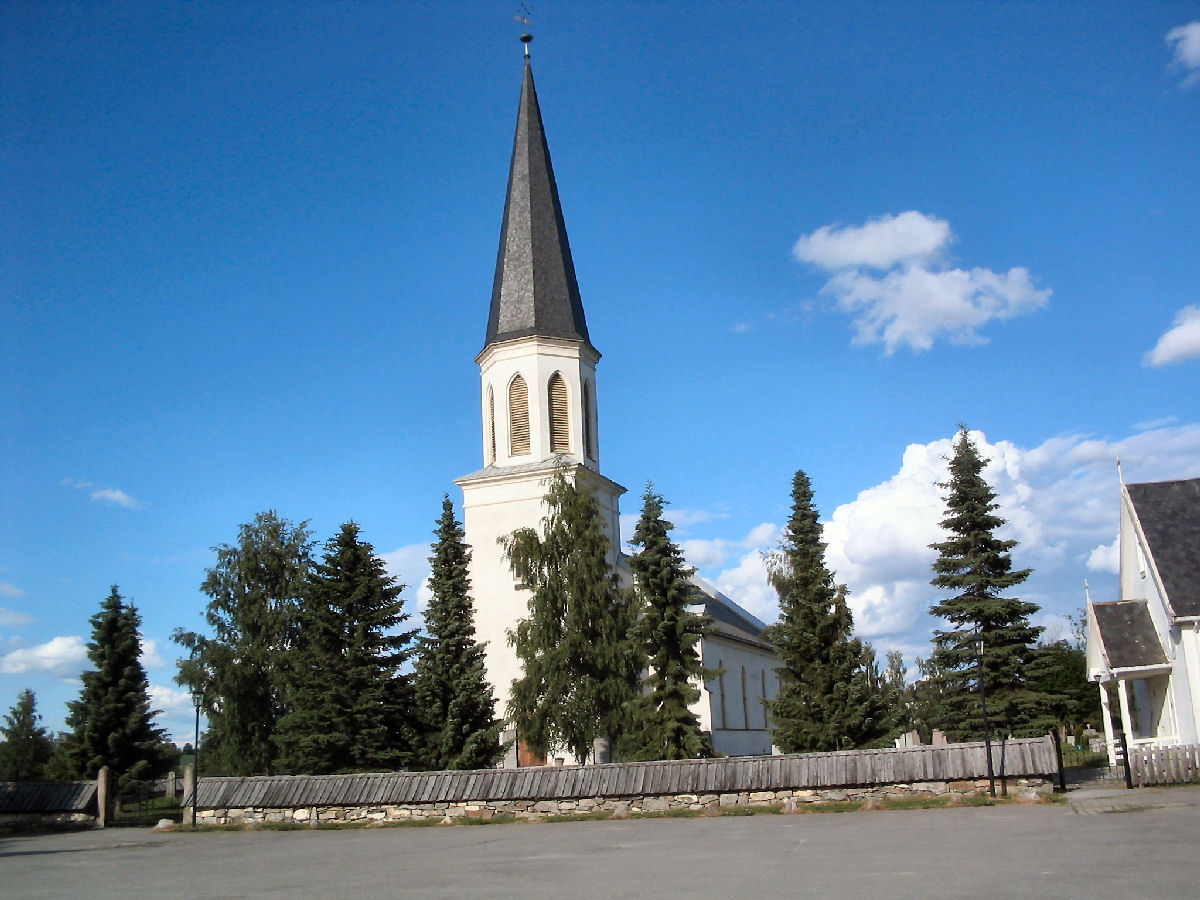
Romedal Church

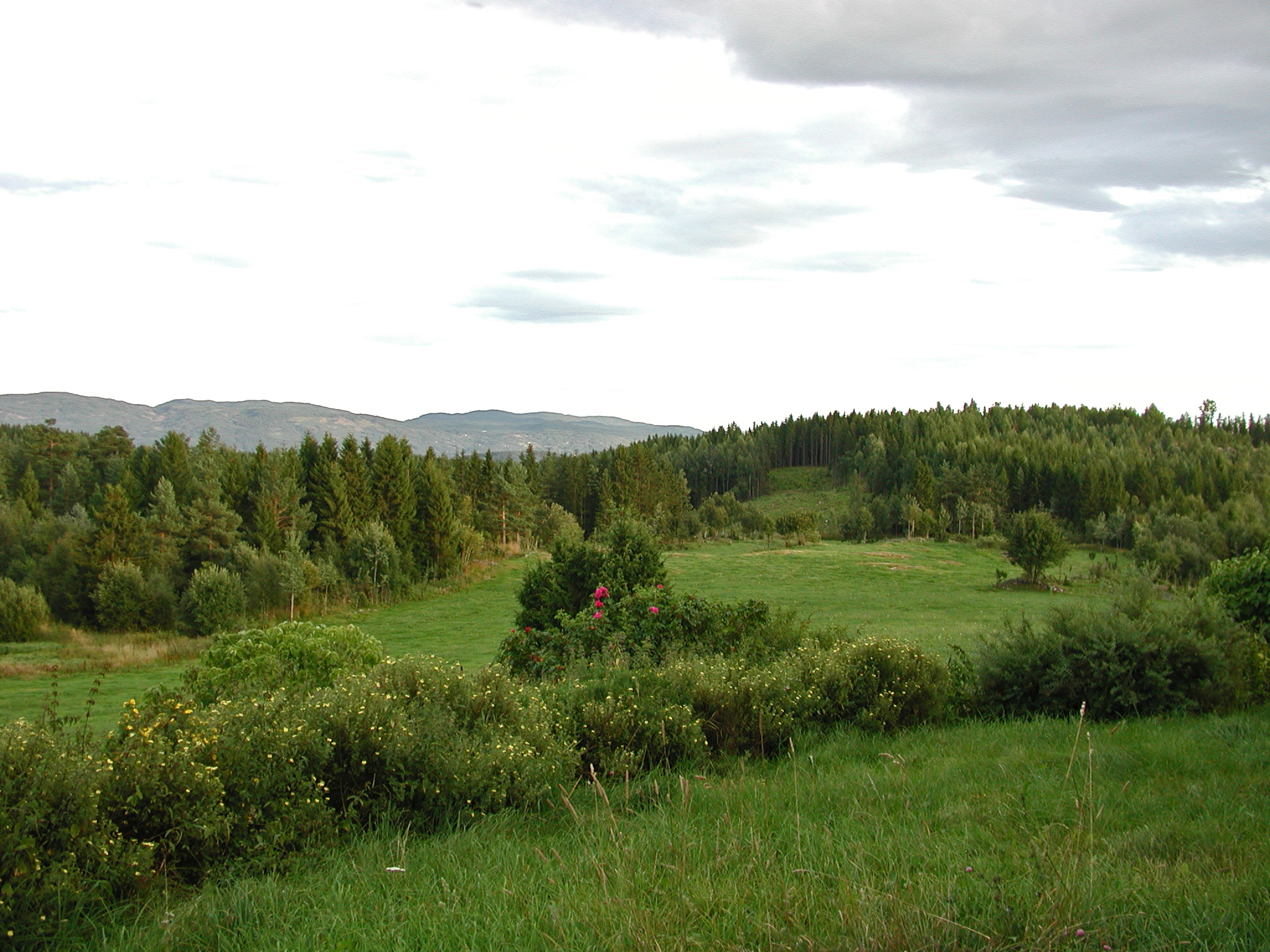
Just a few kilometers away, the craggy, forested side of Stange

The parish of Stange was established as a municipality on 1 January 1838 (see formannskapsdistrikt law). During the 1960s, there were many municipal mergers across Norway due to the work of the Schei Committee. On 1 January 1964, Romedal Municipality (population: 6,441) and Stange Municipality (population: 9,734) were merged to form a new, larger Stange Municipality with a population of 16,175 residents. On 13 July 1956, a small part of the neighboring Vang Municipality (population: 24) was transferred to Stange Municipality.

Historically, the municipality was part of the old Hedmark county. On 1 January 2020, the municipality became a part of the newly-formed Innlandet county (after Hedmark and Oppland counties were merged).

=== Name ===
The municipality (originally the parish) is named after the old Stange farm (Old Norse: Stangir) since the first Stange Church was built there. The name is the plural form of stǫng which means "bar", "pole", or "rod". (The farm is lying on a long hill, and this is probably the background for the name.)

=== Coat of arms ===
The coat of arms was granted on 20 June 1986. The official blazon is "Vert, a plough argent" (Norwegian: I grønt en sølv ard). This means the arms have a green field (background) and the charge is a medieval plough called an ard. The charge has a tincture of argent which means it is commonly colored white, but if it is made out of metal, then silver is used. The design symbolizes this historic importance of agriculture in the area; originally the growing of grains and then later growing potatoes. The arms were designed by Arne Løvstad. The municipal flag has the same design as the coat of arms.

=== Churches ===
The Church of Norway has five parishes (sokn) within Stange Municipality. It is part of the Hamar domprosti (arch-deanery) in the Diocese of Hamar.

Churches in Stange
Parish (sokn)	Church name	Location of the church	Year built
Ottestad	Ottestad Church	Ottestad	1731
Romedal	Romedal Church	Romedal	1887
Stange	Stange Church	Stangebyen	c. 1250
Tangen	Strandlykkja Church	Strandlykkja	1915
Tangen	Tangen Church	Tangen	1861
Vallset	Vallset Church	Vallset	1850

=== Media ===
The newspaper Stangeavisa has been published in Stange since 2004.

== History ==
Archeological finds indicate agricultural settlements in the area well before the Viking Age. Since the shortest route from the south to Hamar went through the area, there have also been trade and hospitality there since time immemorial. Stange has its own historical association that publishes articles, short research topics, as well as authoritative works on the area's history.

Number of minorities (1st and 2nd generation) in Stange by country of origin in 2017
Ancestry	Number
Poland	243
Eritrea	182
Germany	134
Sweden	99
Afghanistan	97
Somalia	92
Lithuania	91
Kosovo	79
Vietnam	68
Thailand	66

Stange Church is located in Stangebyen. The church is mentioned in 1225 in Håkon Håkonsen's saga and the current church building was constructed around the year 1250.

The Atlungstad Distillery was established in Stange in 1855.

== Geography ==
The municipality is situated on the east side of the lake Mjøsa. It borders Hamar Municipality to the north; Løten Municipality, Våler Municipality, and Åsnes Municipality to the east; Nord-Odal Municipality to the south; and Eidsvoll Municipality (in Akershus county) to the west.

The municipality can be roughly divided into two areas: the northern area, with rich and fertile agricultural land; and a southern area with craggy, forested area (the Stange Commons). As a result, the northern section is dominated by large, prosperous farms; the southern part by small, marginal farms. The rivers Lageråa and Svartelva both run through the municipality.The highest point in the municipality is the 642.63-metre (2,108.4 ft) tall mountain Søndre Fjellsjøhøgda in the southeastern part of the municipality.

== Government ==
Stange Municipality is responsible for primary education (through 10th grade), outpatient health services, senior citizen services, welfare and other social services, zoning, economic development, and municipal roads and utilities. The municipality is governed by a municipal council of directly elected representatives. The mayor is indirectly elected by a vote of the municipal council. The municipality is under the jurisdiction of the Hedmarken og Østerdal District Court and the Eidsivating Court of Appeal.

=== Municipal council ===
The municipal council (Kommunestyre) of Stange Municipality is made up of 35 representatives that are elected to four year terms. The tables below show the current and historical composition of the council by political party.

Stange kommunestyre 2023–2027
Party name (in Norwegian)	Number of representatives
Labour Party (Arbeiderpartiet)	10
Progress Party (Fremskrittspartiet)	3
Green Party (Miljøpartiet De Grønne)	1
Conservative Party (Høyre)	3
Christian Democratic Party (Kristelig Folkeparti)	2
Pensioners' Party (Pensjonistpartiet)	1
Red Party (Rødt)	1
Centre Party (Senterpartiet)	3
Socialist Left Party (Sosialistisk Venstreparti)	2
Liberal Party (Venstre)	1
Environment list (Nærmiljølista)	5
Local list in Stange (Bygdelista i Stange)	1
Total number of members:	35

Stange kommunestyre 2019–2023
Party name (in Norwegian)	Number of representatives
Labour Party (Arbeiderpartiet)	13
Progress Party (Fremskrittspartiet)	2
Green Party (Miljøpartiet De Grønne)	1
Conservative Party (Høyre)	2
Christian Democratic Party (Kristelig Folkeparti)	1
Red Party (Rødt)	1
Centre Party (Senterpartiet)	9
Socialist Left Party (Sosialistisk Venstreparti)	2
Environment list Ottestad (Nærmiljølista Ottestad)	3
Local list in Stange (Bygdelista i Stange)	1
Total number of members:	35

Stange kommunestyre 2015–2019
Party name (in Norwegian)	Number of representatives
Labour Party (Arbeiderpartiet)	16
Progress Party (Fremskrittspartiet)	2
Green Party (Miljøpartiet De Grønne)	2
Conservative Party (Høyre)	3
Christian Democratic Party (Kristelig Folkeparti)	2
Pensioners' Party (Pensjonistpartiet)	1
Centre Party (Senterpartiet)	5
Socialist Left Party (Sosialistisk Venstreparti)	1
Liberal Party (Venstre)	1
Local list in Stange (Bygdelista i Stange)	2
Total number of members:	35

Stange kommunestyre 2011–2015
Party name (in Norwegian)	Number of representatives
Labour Party (Arbeiderpartiet)	18
Progress Party (Fremskrittspartiet)	3
Conservative Party (Høyre)	4
Christian Democratic Party (Kristelig Folkeparti)	2
Pensioners' Party (Pensjonistpartiet)	1
Centre Party (Senterpartiet)	3
Socialist Left Party (Sosialistisk Venstreparti)	1
Liberal Party (Venstre)	2
Local list for Stange (Bygdelista for Stange)	1
Total number of members:	35

Stange kommunestyre 2007–2011
Party name (in Norwegian)	Number of representatives
Labour Party (Arbeiderpartiet)	14
Progress Party (Fremskrittspartiet)	4
Conservative Party (Høyre)	2
Christian Democratic Party (Kristelig Folkeparti)	2
Pensioners' Party (Pensjonistpartiet)	2
Centre Party (Senterpartiet)	5
Socialist Left Party (Sosialistisk Venstreparti)	2
Liberal Party (Venstre)	2
Local list for Stange (Bygdelista for Stange)	2
Total number of members:	35

Stange kommunestyre 2003–2007
Party name (in Norwegian)	Number of representatives
Labour Party (Arbeiderpartiet)	18
Progress Party (Fremskrittspartiet)	5
Conservative Party (Høyre)	3
Christian Democratic Party (Kristelig Folkeparti)	2
Pensioners' Party (Pensjonistpartiet)	3
Centre Party (Senterpartiet)	4
Socialist Left Party (Sosialistisk Venstreparti)	6
Liberal Party (Venstre)	1
Local list for Stange (Bygdelista for Stange)	2
Total number of members:	43

Stange kommunestyre 1999–2003
Party name (in Norwegian)	Number of representatives
Labour Party (Arbeiderpartiet)	20
Progress Party (Fremskrittspartiet)	3
Conservative Party (Høyre)	3
Christian Democratic Party (Kristelig Folkeparti)	2
Centre Party (Senterpartiet)	5
Socialist Left Party (Sosialistisk Venstreparti)	5
Liberal Party (Venstre)	1
Local list for Stange (Bygdelista for Stange)	4
Total number of members:	43

Stange kommunestyre 1995–1999
Party name (in Norwegian)	Number of representatives
Labour Party (Arbeiderpartiet)	23
Progress Party (Fremskrittspartiet)	3
Conservative Party (Høyre)	3
Christian Democratic Party (Kristelig Folkeparti)	2
Centre Party (Senterpartiet)	8
Socialist Left Party (Sosialistisk Venstreparti)	4
Total number of members:	43

Stange kommunestyre 1991–1995
Party name (in Norwegian)	Number of representatives
Labour Party (Arbeiderpartiet)	28
Progress Party (Fremskrittspartiet)	1
Conservative Party (Høyre)	5
Christian Democratic Party (Kristelig Folkeparti)	2
Centre Party (Senterpartiet)	8
Socialist Left Party (Sosialistisk Venstreparti)	11
Total number of members:	55

Stange kommunestyre 1987–1991
Party name (in Norwegian)	Number of representatives
Labour Party (Arbeiderpartiet)	37
Progress Party (Fremskrittspartiet)	3
Conservative Party (Høyre)	5
Christian Democratic Party (Kristelig Folkeparti)	2
Centre Party (Senterpartiet)	4
Socialist Left Party (Sosialistisk Venstreparti)	4
Total number of members:	55

Stange kommunestyre 1983–1987
Party name (in Norwegian)	Number of representatives
Labour Party (Arbeiderpartiet)	37
Progress Party (Fremskrittspartiet)	1
Conservative Party (Høyre)	6
Christian Democratic Party (Kristelig Folkeparti)	2
Centre Party (Senterpartiet)	5
Socialist Left Party (Sosialistisk Venstreparti)	4
Total number of members:	55

Stange kommunestyre 1979–1983
Party name (in Norwegian)	Number of representatives
Labour Party (Arbeiderpartiet)	36
Conservative Party (Høyre)	7
Christian Democratic Party (Kristelig Folkeparti)	3
Centre Party (Senterpartiet)	6
Socialist Left Party (Sosialistisk Venstreparti)	3
Total number of members:	55

Stange kommunestyre 1975–1979
Party name (in Norwegian)	Number of representatives
Labour Party (Arbeiderpartiet)	36
Conservative Party (Høyre)	4
Christian Democratic Party (Kristelig Folkeparti)	3
New People's Party (Nye Folkepartiet)	1
Centre Party (Senterpartiet)	7
Socialist Left Party (Sosialistisk Venstreparti)	4
Total number of members:	55

Stange kommunestyre 1971–1975
Party name (in Norwegian)	Number of representatives
Labour Party (Arbeiderpartiet)	37
Conservative Party (Høyre)	4
Communist Party (Kommunistiske Parti)	1
Christian Democratic Party (Kristelig Folkeparti)	2
Centre Party (Senterpartiet)	7
Socialist People's Party (Sosialistisk Folkeparti)	3
Liberal Party (Venstre)	1
Total number of members:	55

Stange kommunestyre 1967–1971
Party name (in Norwegian)	Number of representatives
Labour Party (Arbeiderpartiet)	37
Conservative Party (Høyre)	5
Communist Party (Kommunistiske Parti)	1
Christian Democratic Party (Kristelig Folkeparti)	1
Centre Party (Senterpartiet)	7
Socialist People's Party (Sosialistisk Folkeparti)	3
Liberal Party (Venstre)	1
Total number of members:	55

Stange kommunestyre 1963–1967
Party name (in Norwegian)	Number of representatives
Labour Party (Arbeiderpartiet)	37
Conservative Party (Høyre)	6
Communist Party (Kommunistiske Parti)	2
Christian Democratic Party (Kristelig Folkeparti)	2
Centre Party (Senterpartiet)	6
Socialist People's Party (Sosialistisk Folkeparti)	2
Total number of members:	55
Note: On 1 January 1964, Romedal Municipality became part of Stange Municipality.

Stange herredsstyre 1959–1963
Party name (in Norwegian)	Number of representatives
Labour Party (Arbeiderpartiet)	24
Conservative Party (Høyre)	4
Communist Party (Kommunistiske Parti)	1
Centre Party (Senterpartiet)	4
Total number of members:	33

Stange herredsstyre 1955–1959
Party name (in Norwegian)	Number of representatives
Labour Party (Arbeiderpartiet)	24
Conservative Party (Høyre)	3
Communist Party (Kommunistiske Parti)	2
Farmers' Party (Bondepartiet)	4
Total number of members:	33

Stange herredsstyre 1951–1955
Party name (in Norwegian)	Number of representatives
Labour Party (Arbeiderpartiet)	22
Conservative Party (Høyre)	3
Communist Party (Kommunistiske Parti)	1
Farmers' Party (Bondepartiet)	4
Local List(s) (Lokale lister)	2
Total number of members:	32

Stange herredsstyre 1947–1951
Party name (in Norwegian)	Number of representatives
Labour Party (Arbeiderpartiet)	22
Communist Party (Kommunistiske Parti)	3
Joint List(s) of Non-Socialist Parties (Borgerlige Felleslister)	7
Total number of members:	32

Stange herredsstyre 1945–1947
Party name (in Norwegian)	Number of representatives
Labour Party (Arbeiderpartiet)	18
Communist Party (Kommunistiske Parti)	4
Christian Democratic Party (Kristelig Folkeparti)	1
Joint List(s) of Non-Socialist Parties (Borgerlige Felleslister)	5
Total number of members:	28

Stange herredsstyre 1937–1940*
Party name (in Norwegian)	Number of representatives
Labour Party (Arbeiderpartiet)	21
Conservative Party (Høyre)	3
Farmers' Party (Bondepartiet)	4
Total number of members:	28
Note: Due to the German occupation of Norway during World War II, no elections were held for new municipal councils until after the war ended in 1945.

=== Mayors ===
The mayor (Norwegian: ordfører) of Stange Municipality is the political leader of the municipality and the chairperson of the municipal council. Here is a list of people who have held this position:

- 1838–1840: Michel Andersen Saxlund
- 1841–1842: Even Christensen Ringnes
- 1843–1846: Ole Erichsen Frostad
- 1847–1848: Martinus Hansen Lalum
- 1849–1850: Severin Michelsen Saxlund
- 1851–1854: Martinus Hansen Lalum
- 1855–1856: Ole Nilsen
- 1857–1859: Iver Jonsen Grimerud
- 1859–1866: Severin Michelsen Saxlund
- 1867–1870: Mons Olsen Hosmestad
- 1871–1874: Anders Christophersen Musli
- 1875–1882: Ludvig Anton Øwre
- 1883–1884: Ole Nilsen Ringens
- 1885–1888: Jakob Christophersen Gaustad
- 1888–1888: Lars Christiansen Schjerden
- 1889–1892: Jakob Christophersen Gaustad
- 1893–1898: Carl Wedel-Jarlsberg
- 1899–1901: Ole Nilsen Ringens
- 1902–1904: O. Rostad
- 1905–1907: Frantz Blehr
- 1908–1916: Hans Helmersen Sørholte
- 1917–1917: M. Hestnes
- 1918–1919: Albert Sørlie
- 1920–1922: Ebbe Carsten Morten Astrup
- 1923–1926: Martin Hestnæs (Ap)
- 1926–1941: Kristian Fjeld (Ap)
- 1941–1942: Ottar Opsand (NS)
- 1943–1945: E. Wollebæk (NS)
- 1945–1945: Kristian Fjeld (Ap)
- 1946–1951: Christian Stensbak (Ap)
- 1952–1976: Arnljot Johnstad (Ap)
- 1977–1983: Jens K. Nybruket (Ap)
- 1984–2007: Jan Tyriberget (Ap)
- 2007–2022: Nils A. Røhne (Ap)
- 2022–present: Bjarne H. Christiansen (Ap)

== Twin towns – sister cities ==
Stange has sister city agreements with the following places:

- Botkyrka Municipality, Sweden
- Brøndby Municipality, Denmark

== Notable people ==
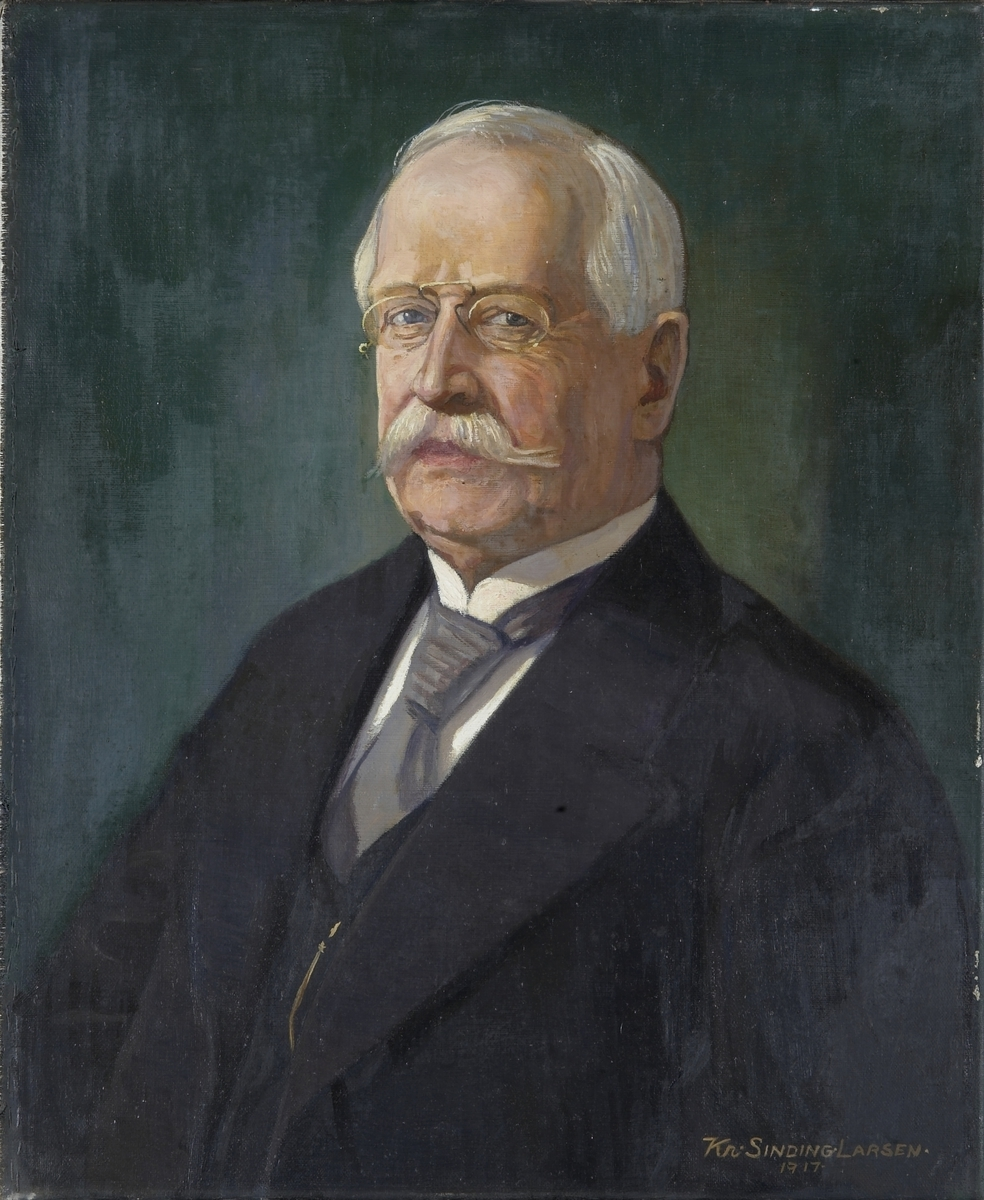
Otto Albert Blehr, 1917

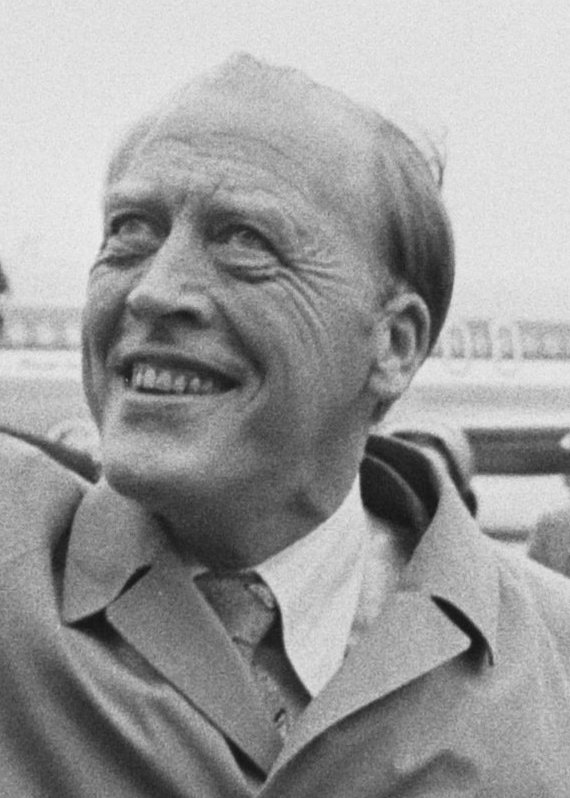
Odvar Nordli, 1976

- Bolette Gjør (1835–1909), a writer and inner missionary who was brought up in Romedal
- Otto Blehr (1847 in Stange – 1927), an attorney and Prime Minister of Norway from 1902 to 1903
- Holm Hansen Munthe (1848 in Stange – 1898), an architect of the Dragon Style
- Kristoffer Olsen Oustad (1857 in Romedal – 1943), a Norwegian-American engineer who built bridges
- Hulda Garborg (1862 at Såstad farm – 1934), a novelist, playwright, poet, folk dancer, and theatre instructor who kindled interest in the bunad tradition
- Eiliv Austlid (1899–1940), a farmer and army officer who lived at Såstad Søndre farm from 1924
- Ingrid Semmingsen (1910–1995), the first female professor of history in Norway who grew up in Stange
- Odvar Nordli (1927 in Tangen – 2018), a politician and Prime Minister of Norway from 1976 to 1981
- Nils A. Røhne (born 1949 in Stange), a Norwegian politician and Mayor of Stange from 2007
- Linda Bakke (born 1973), an artist who lives in Stange
- Trygve Slagsvold Vedum (born 1978), a leader of the Centre Party who grew up in Romedal
- Bård Lahn (born 1983 in Stange), an environmentalist with Natur og Ungdom

=== Sport ===
- Trygve Brudevold (born 1920 in Stange – 2021), a bobsledder who competed at the 1956 Winter Olympics
- Ole Holm (1870 in Stange – 1956), a rifle shooter and team silver medallist in the 1906 Summer Olympics
- Eskil Rønningsbakken (born 1979 in Vallset), an entertainer who does dangerous balancing acts and tightrope walking
