= Stangebyen =

Village in Stange Municipality, Norway

Stangebyen Stange
- Village
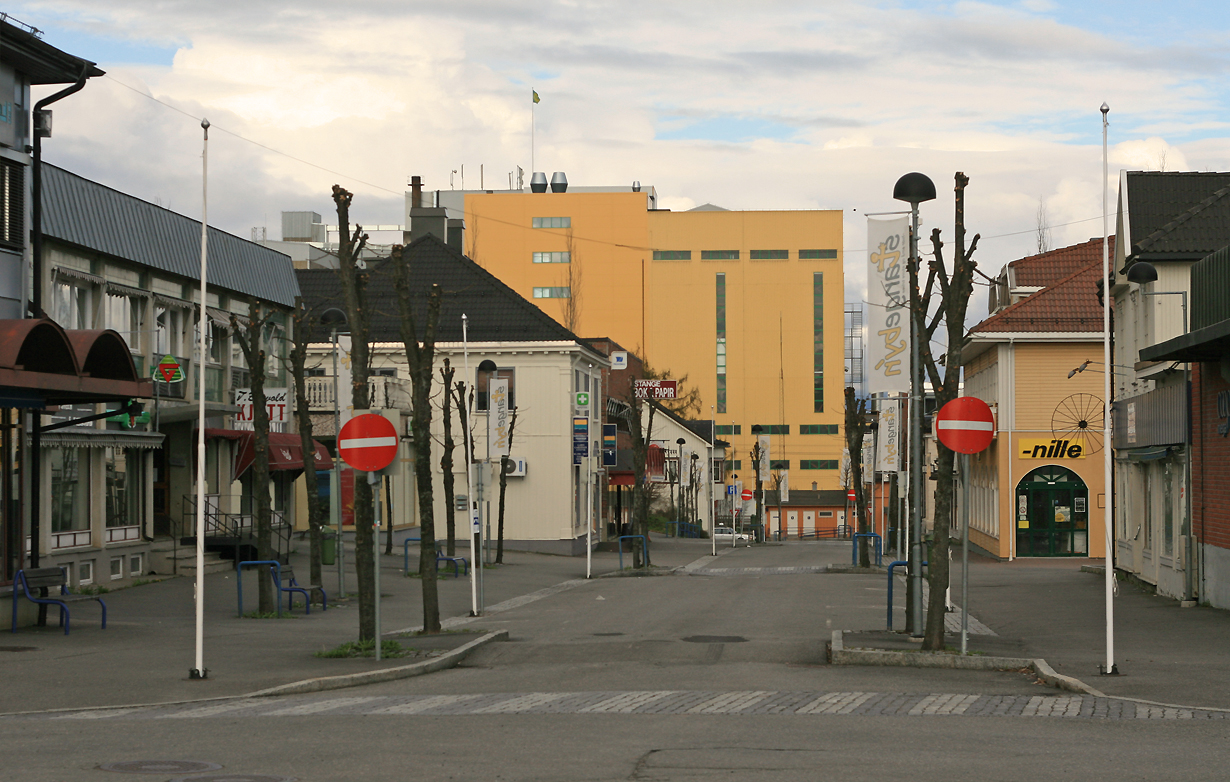
- View of the village
- Interactive map of Stangebyen; Stange
- Location within Innlandet Location within Norway
- Coordinates: 60.71804°N 11.19414°E
- Country: Norway
- Region: Eastern Norway
- County: Innlandet
- District: Hedmarken
- Municipality: Stange Municipality

Area
  - Total: 2.42 km^{2} (0.93 sq mi)
- Elevation: 224 m (735 ft)

Population (2024)
  - Total: 3,508
  - Density: 1,450/km^{2} (3,800/sq mi)
- Time zone: UTC+01:00 (CET)
  - Summer (DST): UTC+02:00 (CEST)
- Post Code: 2335 Stange

Stange or Stangebyen is the administrative centre of Stange Municipality in Innlandet county, Norway. The village is located about 15 kilometres (9.3 mi) south of the town of Hamar. The European route E6 highway runs along the east side of the village. Stange Church lies about 3 kilometres (1.9 mi) west of the village.

The 2.42-square-kilometre (600-acre) village has a population (2024) of 3,508 and a population density of 1,450 inhabitants per square kilometre (3,800/sq mi).
