= Kristian Vilhelm Koren Schjelderup =

Kristian Vilhelm Koren Schjelderup may refer to:

- Kristian Vilhelm Koren Schjelderup, Sr. (1853-1913), Norwegian bishop
- Kristian Vilhelm Koren Schjelderup, Jr. (1894-1980), Norwegian bishop and son of the former
