= Hamar arch-deanery =

Part of the Church of Norway

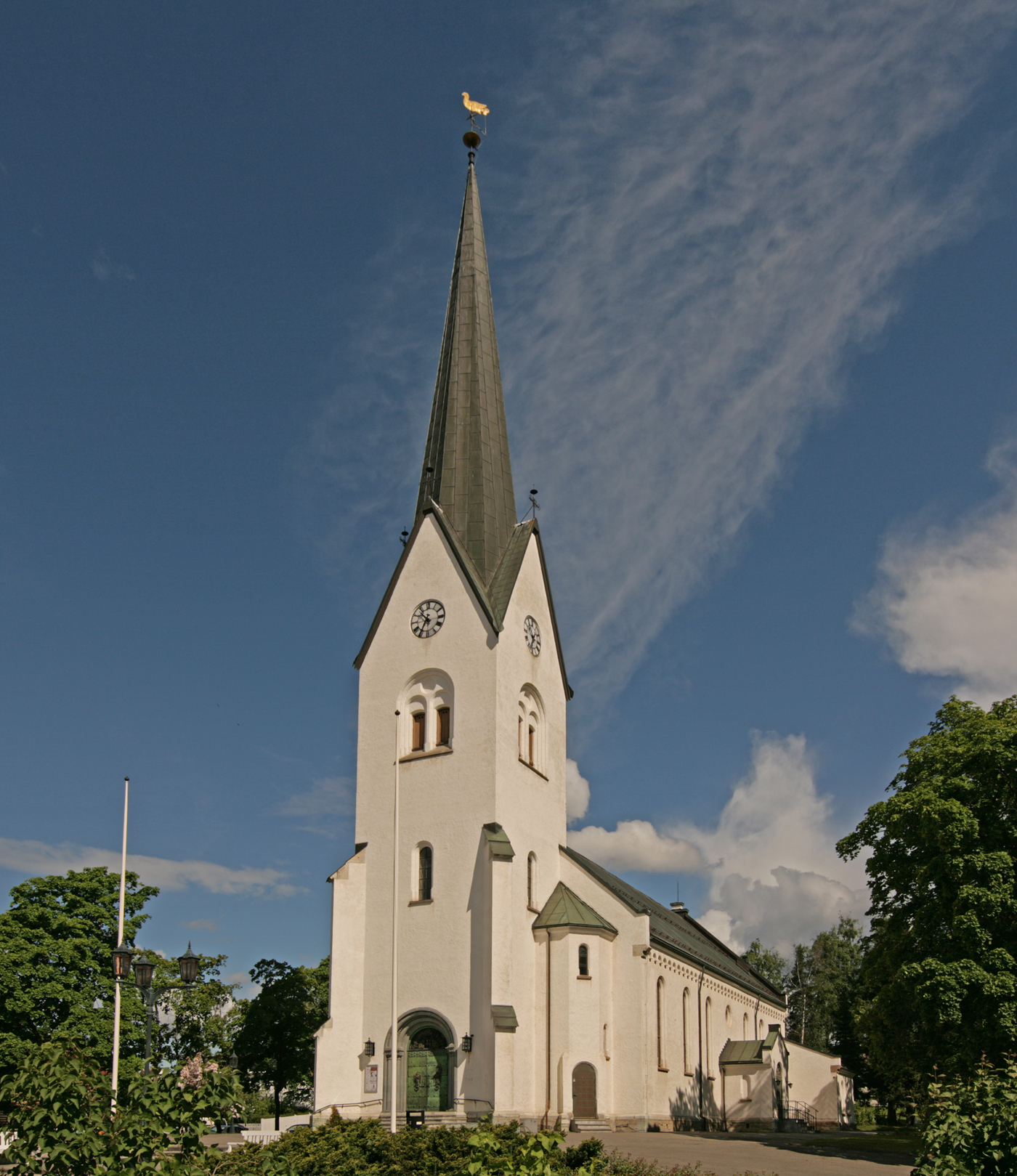
Hamar Cathedral

Hamar arch-deanery (Norwegian: Hamar domprosti) is a deanery in the Diocese of Hamar which is part of the Church of Norway. This arch-deanery covers several municipalities in the central part of the diocese. It includes the municipalities of Hamar, Løten, Ringsaker Municipality, and Stange. The arch-deanery is headquartered at the Hamar Cathedral in the city of Hamar in Hamar Municipality.

== History ==
Prior to the protestant reformation in Norway, the Ancient Diocese of Hamar oversaw this part of the Kingdom. After the reformation, the old diocese was closed down and merged into another diocese. The re-creation of the Diocese of Hamar was initiated with a Royal Resolution dated February 27, 1864, effective October 1, 1864. All of the old deaneries were continued on in the new diocese. Also on October 1, 1864 the old Hedemarken prosti was divided in two: Hamar arch-deanery (Norwegian: Hamar stiftprosti) and Hedemarken prosti. The new Hamar arch-deanery consisted of the Vang Church prestegjeld and the parish priest at Vang Church also was named the dean of the deanery. On May 1, 1908, the newly established parishes of Furnes and Hamar also became part of the Hamar arch-deanery (in addition to the Vang parish). The Hamar stiftprosti changed its name in 1922 to Hamar domprosti. On January 1, 1972, Hedemarken prosti was abolished and incorporated into the Hamar arch-deanery. In 2007, all the parishes in Ringsaker Municipality were transferred out of the Hamar arch-deanery and into the newly created Ringsaker prosti that was based in Moelv at Ringsaker Church. On 1 January 2025, the Ringsaker prosti was merged (back) into the Hamar domprosti once again.

== Churches ==
The arch-deanery includes many churches and chapels in the four municipalities. Each municipality makes up a clerical district which in turn is divided into one or more parishes. There is at least one church for each parish. In addition, there are chapels at Hamar Hospital, Hamar Prison, and Ilseng Prison which are part of the Hamar arch-deanery.

Clerical districts	Parishes	Churches
Hamar	Hamar	Hamar Cathedral and Storhamar Church
Hamar	Vang	Vang Church and Øvre Vang Church
Løten	Løten	Løten Church, Oppegård Chapel, and Oset Chapel
Ringsaker	Brumunddal/Veldre	Brumunddal Church and Veldre Church
Ringsaker	Brøttum	Brøttum Church and Mesnali Church
Ringsaker	Furnes	Furnes Church
Ringsaker	Nes	Helgøya Church, Nes Church, and Stavsjø Church
Ringsaker	Ringsaker	Ringsaker Church
Ringsaker	Åsmarka	Åsmarka Church
Stange	Ottestad	Ottestad Church
Stange	Romedal	Romedal Church
Stange	Stange	Stange Church
Stange	Tangen	Tangen Church and Strandlykkja Church
Stange	Vallset	Vallset Church

== Priests ==
The following parish priests for Vang Church were also the deanery priests.

- 1846-1876: Paul Vinsnes
- 1876-1887: Arnoldus Marius Hille
- 1888-1889: Oluf Saxe
- 1890-1908: David Christopher Frich
- 1908-1917: Hans Emil Erichsen
- 1917-1922: Mikkel Bjønness-Jacobsen
- 1922-1931: Olaf Riddervold-Olsen
- 1931-1939: Jørgen Thronsen
- 1940-1949: Sverre Jervell
- 1950-1963: Hans Finstad
- 1963-1972: Anders Aschim
- 1972-1980: Herman Kvarving
- 1980-1985: Christian Martin Myhre-Nielsen
- 1985-1997: Nils Kristian Lie
- 1997-2012: Ole Elias Holck
- 2012-2020: Leif Jørn Hvidsten
- 2020-present: Kirsten Almås
