= Köhn (surname) =

Surname list

Köhn is a surname. Notable people with the surname include:

- Derrick Köhn (born 1999), Ghanaian footballer
- Philipp Köhn (born 1998), German goalkeeper
- Rosemarie Köhn (1939–2022), Norway bishop
