= Xamar =

Xamar may refer to:

- Mogadishu, capital of Somalia, locally known as Xamar or Hamar
- Abdo Xamar Qoodh, Djiboutian songwriter, composer and singer
- Juan Carlos Etxegoien, Basque writer from Navarre, better known as Xamar

== See also ==
- Hamar (disambiguation)
