= Hamar (disambiguation) =

Hamar is a town in the municipality of Hamar in Innlandet county, Norway.

Hamar may also refer to:

== People ==
- Hamar people, an Omotic ethnic group from southeastern Ethiopia
- Hamar Bass, British brewer, race horse breeder, and politician
- Hamar Greenwood, 1st Viscount Greenwood, British politician (1870–1948)
- Abdullah Al-Hamar, an Omani footballer who plays for Al-Nasr S.C.S
- Fernand Hamar (1869-1943), a French sculptor
- Imre Hamar, a professor of Chinese studies at Eötvös Loránd University in Budapest, Hungary
- István Hamar, a Hungarian football player who currently plays for Vecsés FC

== Places ==
=== Norway ===
- Hamar Municipality, a municipality in Innlandet county, Norway
- Hamar arch-deanery, an arch-deanery within the Church of Norway, based in the town of Hamar, Norway
- Hamar Cathedral, a cathedral of the Church of Norway in the town of Hamar, Norway
- Hamar Cathedral School, upper secondary school in Hamar, Norway
- Hamar Station, railway station in Hamar, Norway
- Hamar stadion, bandy stadium in Hamar, Norway
- Hamar Airport, Stafsberg, airport in Hamar, Norway

=== Somalia ===
- Hamar, one of the names of Mogadishu, a city in Somalia
- Hamar Weyne District, a district in the southeastern Banaadir region of Somalia
- Hamar Jajab District, a district in the southeastern Banaadir region of Somalia

=== Elsewhere ===
- Hamar, North Dakota

== Sports ==
- Hamar IL, a sports club based in Hamar, Norway

== Other uses ==
- Hamar Chronicle
- Hamar Dagblad, weekly newspaper in Hamar, Norway (1971–2022)
- Hamar Arbeiderblad, newspaper published in Hamar, Norway

== See also ==
- Hammar (disambiguation)
- Hammer (disambiguation)
