= Georg Hille =

Norwegian clergyman (1923–2023)

Bishop of the Diocese of Hamar Georg Hille

Personal details
- Born: 28 December 1923 Varteig, Norway
- Died: 14 July 2023 (aged 99)
- Denomination: Lutheran
- Parents: Henrik Greve Hille
- Occupation: Priest
- Relatives: Arnoldus Hille (grandfather)

Georg Hille (28 December 1923 – 14 July 2023) was a Norwegian clergyman. He served as bishop of the Diocese of Hamar from 1974 to 1993.

== Biography ==
Hille was born in Varteig Municipality as the son of bishop Henrik Greve Hille, and grandson of Arnoldus Hille. He graduated as cand.theol. from the University of Oslo in 1950. From 1951 to 1956 he was secretary for Presteforeningen, and from 1953 to 1955 also for the Norwegian Bible Society. He was priest in Bergen from 1956 to 1957, in Oslo from 1957 to 1963, and in Lom from 1963 to 1971. From 1974 to 1993 he served as bishop of the Diocese of Hamar.

Hille died on 14 July 2023, at the age of 99.

Religious titles
| Preceded by Alex Johnson | Bishop of Hamar; 1974–1993 | Succeeded by Rosemarie Köhn |
