= Ole Kristian Bonden =

Norwegian Lutheran theologian and bishop (born 1970)

- Bishop of Hamar
- Bonden in 2026
- Church: Church of Norway
- Diocese: Hamar
- Elected: November 2022
- Predecessor: Solveig Fiske

Orders
- Ordination: 1997
- Consecration: 29 January 2023

Personal details
- Born: 8 February 1970 (age 56) Hamar
- Denomination: Lutheran
- Education: MF Norwegian School of Theology, Religion and Society

Ole Kristian Bonden (born 8 February 1970) is a Norwegian Lutheran theologian and bishop. He has been the Bishop of Hamar in the Church of Norway since 2023.

== Life and career ==
Born in Hamar on 8 February 1970, Bonden grew up in Brumunddal. He graduated from the MF Norwegian School of Theology, Religion and Society in 1995, and was ordained as priest in Brumunddal Church in 1997. From 2018 he was provost in Sør-Østerdal prosti.

Bonden was elected as bishop of the Diocese of Hamar in November 2022, and consecrated as bishop in Hamar Cathedral on 29 January 2023. He succeeded previous bishop Solveig Fiske.

Religious titles
Preceded by Solveig Fiske	Bishop of Hamar; 2023–present	Incumbent
