= August Henning Weimarck =

Swedish botanist (1903–1980)

- Born: 22 May 1903; Hammar, Sweden
- Died: 12 June 1980 (aged 77); Uppsala, Sweden
- Occupation: botanist
- Scientific career
- Author abbrev. (botany): Weim.

August Henning Weimarck, born 22 May 1903 in Hammar, died 12 June 1980 in Lund, was a Swedish botanist. He studied biology at Lund University, graduating as MSc in 1930, defending his master thesis on the Rosaceae genus Cliffortia in 1935. He was appointed Associate Professor of Botany (1935-1949) at Lund. He was Acting Professor in 1943, and became curator of the Botanical Museum of Lund from 1945 to 1949, He was appointed as professor of Botany in 1950, a position he retired from in 1969. He collected about 5,400 specimens in South Africa and Zimbabwe (1930-1931) together with Thore Fries and Tycho Norlindh. He is commemorated in the name Commelina weimarckiana by Norlindh, a species from Zimbabwe. Weimarck worked from around 1950 on compiling a flora of Skåne and mapping the distribution of the plant species in that area.
