= Hammar =

Hammar may refer to:

- Hammar (surname)
- Hammar Marshes, a large wetland complex in Iraq
- Lake Hammar, saline lake in Iraq
- Hammar, Kristianstad, a locality in Skåne County, Sweden
- Hammar, Askersund, a locality in Örebro County, Sweden
- Hammar experiment, experiment to test the aether drag hypothesis

== See also ==
- Hamar, a town in Norway
- Hamar (disambiguation)
