= Hans Bull Brodtkorb Mohr =

External image
- Portrait.

Hans Bull Brodtkorb Mohr (26 September 1886 – 29 January 1973) was a Norwegian educator and international cooperation activist.

== Early life and career ==
He was born in Haltdalen as a son of vicar Rasmus Christian Mohr (1850–1938) and Anna Johanne Brodtkorb (1853–1925). He finished his secondary education in 1904, finished officer training in 1905 and graduated from the Royal Frederick University with the cand.theol. degree in 1910 and the cand.philol. degree in 1913. After also undergoing teacher training he was hired at Aars og Voss school in 1914 and Hegdehaugen Upper Secondary School from 1918 to 1931. He chaired the Norwegian Students' Society in 1919, and was a board member of the Norwegian Trekking Association from 1926 to 1928 and the National Association of Philologists and Realists from 1928 to 1930.

== Later career ==
From 1931 to 1938 he was a secretaire principal at the Section for Intellectual Cooperation in the League of Nations in Geneva. He returned home to work as a teacher at Oslo Cathedral School from 1939 to 1956.

He became deeply involved in international work in Norway. He co-founded the Anglo-Norse Society in 1921 and served as a board member from 1921 to 1927 and 1939 to 1960, the last seven years as vice chairman. From 1951 to 1955 he was a board member of the Norse Federation. In 1945 he was a delegate at the United Nations Conference for the establishment of UNESCO in 1945, and later six general assemblies of the organization. He was a member of the Norwegian UNESCO committee from 1946 to 1958. He was also active in the Bjørnson Society as well as in Foreningen Norden, and in 1950 and 1951 he sat on the Council of Europe expert committee on cultural cooperation. He died in January 1973.

Cultural offices
Preceded by Kristian Schjelderup	Chairman of the Norwegian Students' Society; 1919 (autumn)	Succeeded by Paul Gjesdahl
