= Halvor Olsen Folkestad =

Bishop in the Church of Norway

Right Reverend Halvor Olsen Folkestad
- Bishop
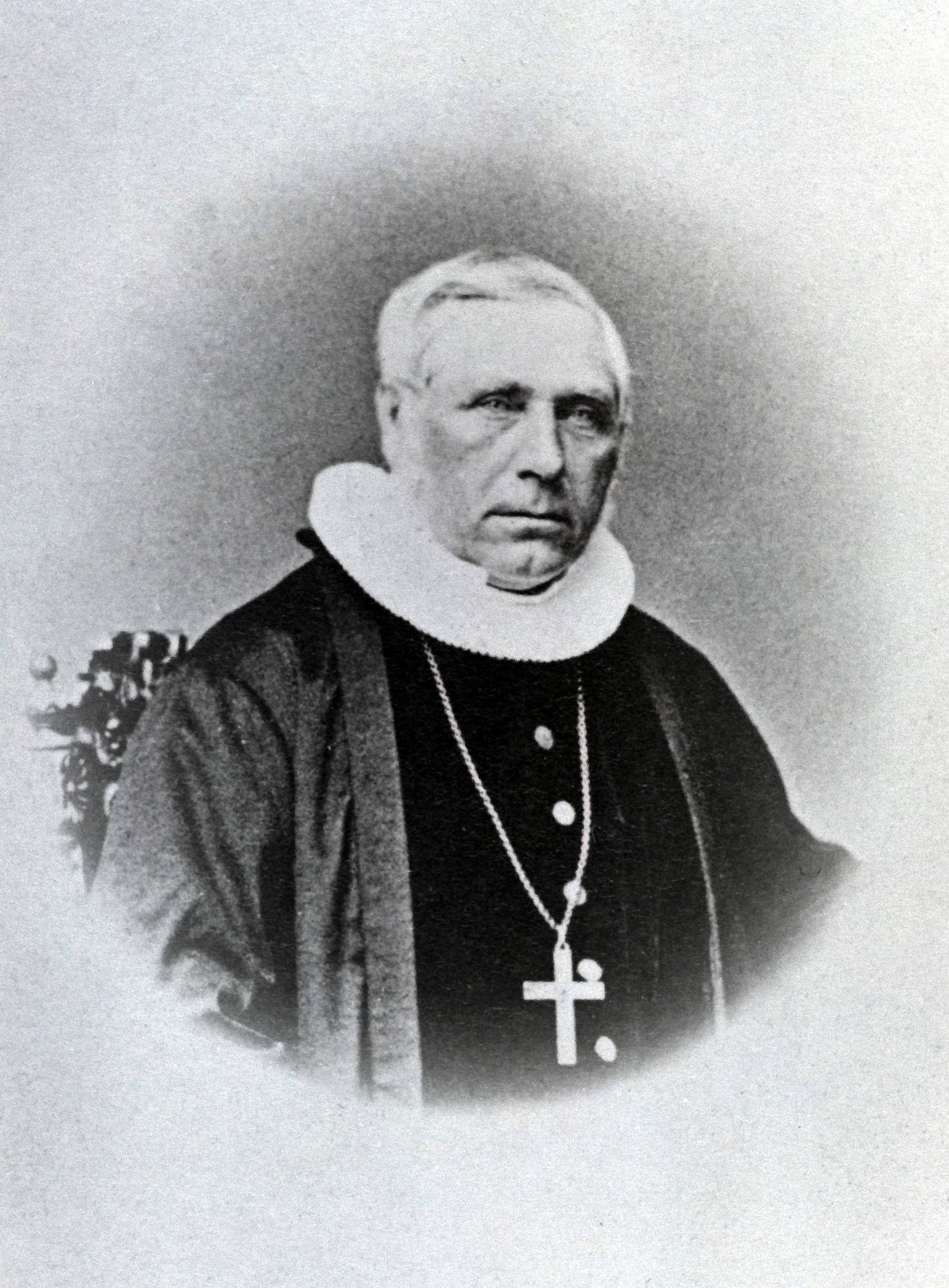
- Church: Church of Norway
- Diocese: Hamar

Personal details
- Born: 28 November 1807 Bø in Telemark, Norway.
- Died: 30 September 1889 (aged 34)
- Denomination: Christian
- Parents: Ole Halvorsen Folkestad; Asberg Augundsdatter
- Occupation: Priest
- Education: Cand.theol.; University of Christiania

Halvor Olsen Folkestad (28 November 1807 – 30 September 1889) was a Bishop in the Church of Norway. He was appointed Norwegian Councillor of State in interim in 1875.

Folkestad was born at Bø in Telemark, Norway. He was the son of Ole Halvorsen Folkestad (1778–1864) and Asberg Augundsdatter (1785–1866). He graduated in 1831 and then worked as a tutor in Gjerpen Municipality. After a year of studies in Christiania (now called Oslo), he received his theological degree in 1836.

In 1841, he was appointed vicar of Mo prestegjeld. From 1849 he served for the next 10 years as parish priest in Kviteseid prestegjeld and inspector at Kviteseid Seminary. In 1859, he became as vicar in Fredrikshald (now called Halden). In 1864 he was appointed bishop of the newly created Diocese of Hamar. In 1873, he was appointed by King Oscar II of Sweden to be royal court pastor (overhoffpredikant). In 1875, he was a member of the interim government during the king's trip abroad.

Folkestad sought and obtained dismissal of the episcopal office in 1887 at age 79. He died at Hamar during 1889 was buried at Vår Frelsers gravlund in Oslo.

Religious titles
New diocese	Bishop of Hamar; 1864–1887	Succeeded by Arnoldus Hille
