= Gunvald Thorkildsen =

Norwegian theologian and bishop

Right Reverend Gunvald Christian Thorkildsen
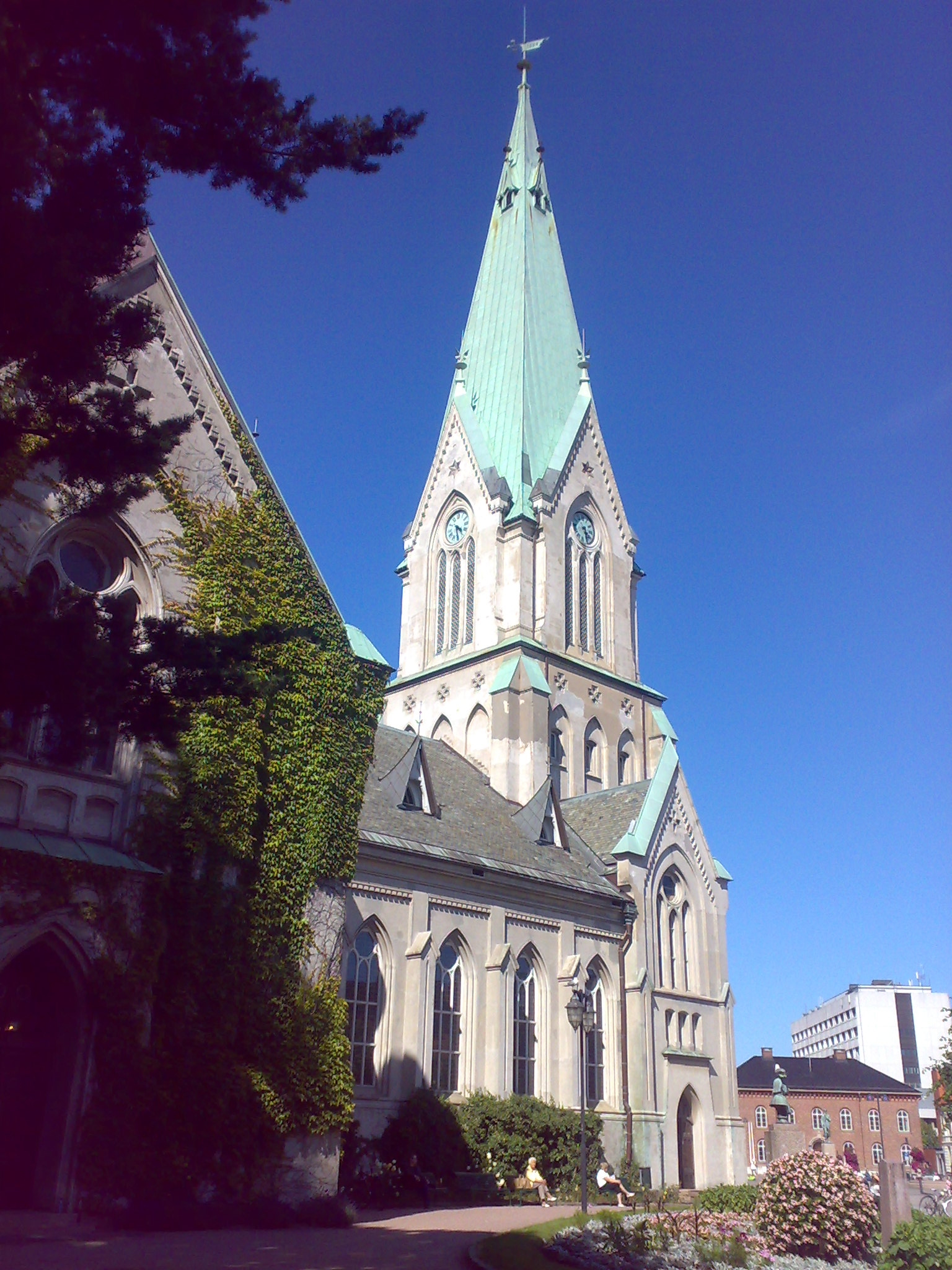
- Church: Church of Norway
- Diocese: Diocese of Kristiansand
- Appointed: 1904
- In office: 1904–1908
- Predecessor: Johan Christian Heuch
- Successor: Kristian Vilhelm Koren Schjelderup, Sr.

Personal details
- Born: 19 July 1845 Kristiansand, Norway
- Died: 19 January 1908 (aged 62) Kristiansand, Norway
- Denomination: Christian
- Parents: Gunvald Christian Thorkildsen and Berte Thorkildsen
- Spouse: Johanne Dick
- Occupation: Priest

Gunvald Christian Berhard Thorkildsen (19 July 1845–1908) was a Norwegian theologian and Bishop in the Church of Norway.

== Personal life ==
Thorkildsen was born on 19 July 1845 in Christianssand, Norway to parents Gunvald Christian Thorkildsen and Berte Thorkildsen. He married Johanne Dich, the daughter of the parish priest Sigismund Christian Dich.

== Career ==
Thorkildsen was a parish priest in Sund Municipality from 1872 until 1877. In 1877, he became the parish priest in Øvrebø Municipality, based at Øvrebø Church, a job which he held until 1890. In 1890, he was transferred to the neighboring parish in Oddernes Municipality, based at the large Oddernes Church. He continued working in Oddernes until 1904 when he was appointed to be the Bishop of the Diocese of Kristiansand which (at that time) covered all of Rogaland, Agder, and Telemark in Southern Norway. He was the bishop from 1904 until his death in 1908.

Religious titles
Preceded by Johan Christian Heuch	Bishop of Kristiansand; 1904–1908	Succeeded by Kristian Schjelderup
