= Paul Gjesdahl =

Norwegian journalist and theatre critic

Paul Dessen Gjesdahl (22 December 1893 – 14 August 1969) was a Norwegian journalist and theatre critic. He was a theatre critic for the newspaper Dagbladet from 1919 to 1930, for Tidens Tegn from 1930 to 1937, and for Arbeiderbladet from 1937 to 1967.

He was a chairman of the Norwegian Students' Society in 1919 and a member of Mot Dag, a board member of the Norwegian Critics' Association for 36 years, and vice chairman of the Norwegian Broadcasting Council from 1946 to 1955.

== Selected works ==
- Premièrer og portretter. 1957.
- Centralteatrets historie. 1964.

Cultural offices
Preceded by Hans Bull Brodtkorb Mohr	Chairman of the Norwegian Students' Society; 1920 (spring)	Succeeded by Thomas Sinding
