= Diocese of Hamar =

Diocese of the Church of Norway

Diocese of Hamar Hamar bispedømme
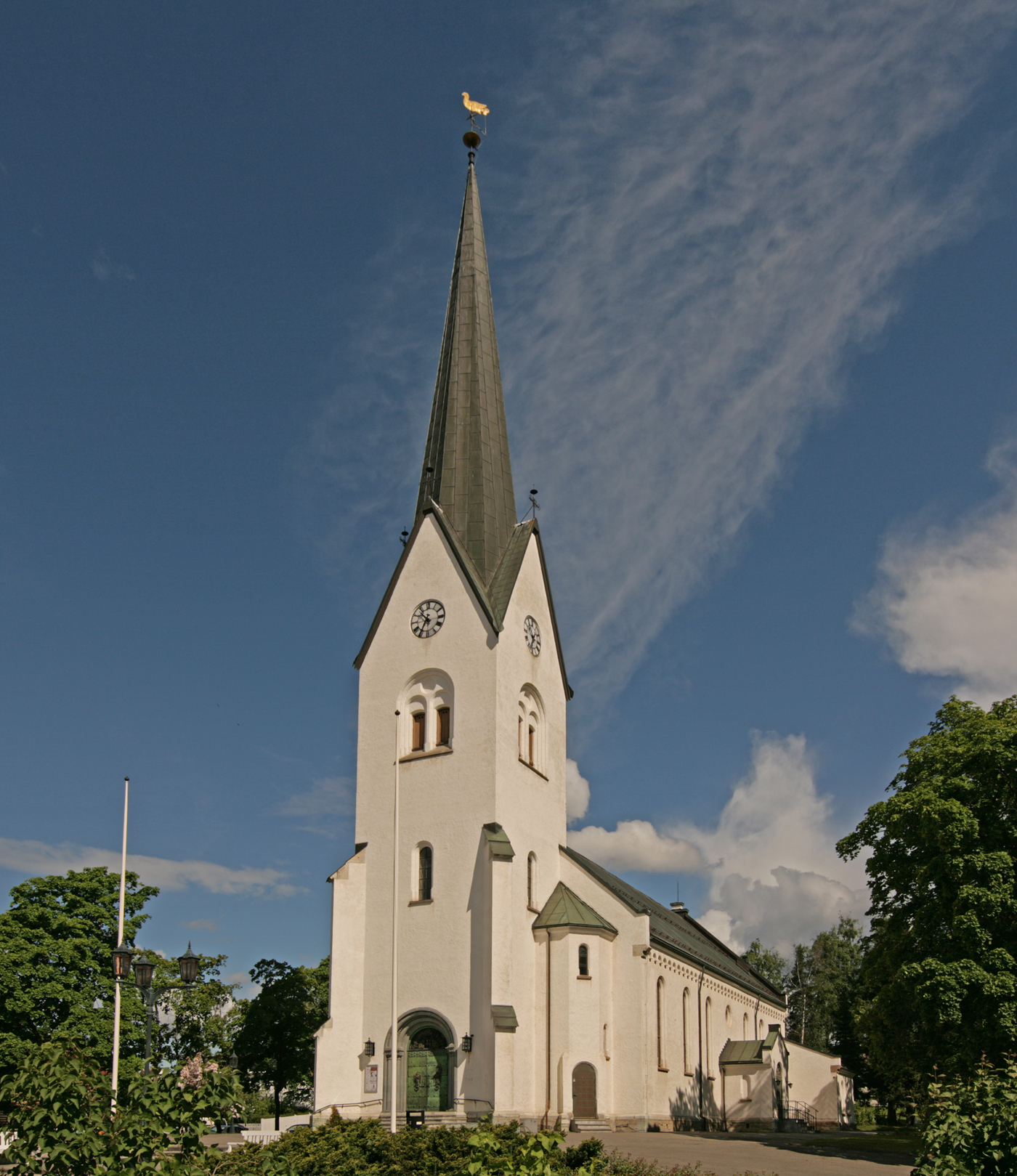
- Hamar Cathedral

Location
- Country: Norway
- Territory: Innlandet and Akershus
- Deaneries: 9
- Headquarters: Hamar

Statistics
- Parishes: 164
- Members: 312,987

Information
- Denomination: Church of Norway
- Established: 1153 (Ancient Diocese of Hamar); 1864 (re-established)
- Dissolved: 1537 (Ancient Diocese of Hamar)
- Cathedral: Hamar Cathedral

Leadership
- Bishop: Ole Kristian Bonden

Map

Website
- Official website

The Diocese of Hamar (Norwegian: Hamar Bispedømme) is a diocese within the Church of Norway. The Diocese of Hamar includes all of the churches in Innlandet county plus the churches in Lunner Municipality in Akershus county. Administratively, the diocese is divided into 10 deaneries and 164 parishes in the diocese. The seat of the Diocese of Hamar is located at the Hamar Cathedral (Norwegian: Hamar domkirke) in the city of Hamar.

== History ==
The Roman Catholic Diocese of Hamar was formed in the year 1152 when it was separated from the Diocese of Oslo. At the time of the Protestant Reformation in Norway in 1536, the archbishop and the bishops were removed and the Diocese of Hamar once again came under the Diocese of Christiania within the new Lutheran Church of Norway. Mogens Lauritsson was the last Roman Catholic bishop of the Ancient Diocese of Hamar.

In 1864, the Lutheran Diocese of Hamar was established when it was separated from the Diocese of Christiania (Christiania was the name of Oslo between 1624 and 1924). Halvor Olsen Folkestad was the first bishop of this new Diocese of Hamar. Hamar Cathedral was consecrated on 15 December 1866 and it was established as the seat of the new Diocese of Hamar. On 1 January 2022, the churches in Jevnaker Municipality were transferred to the Ringerike prosti in the Diocese of Tunsberg.

In 2007, all the parishes in Ringsaker Municipality were transferred out of the Hamar domprosti and into the newly created Ringsaker prosti that was based in Moelv at Ringsaker Church. On 1 January 2025, the Ringsaker prosti was merged (back) into the Hamar domprosti once again.

== Structure ==
The Diocese of Hamar is divided into nine deaneries (Norwegian: Prosti) spread out over Innlandet and Akershus counties. Each deanery corresponds a geographical area, usually one or more municipalities within the diocese. Each municipality is further divided into one or more parishes which each contain one or more congregations.

Deanery (prosti)	Municipalities	County	Location
Hamar domprosti	Hamar, Løten, Ringsaker, Stange	Innlandet	
Solør, Vinger og Odal prosti	Kongsvinger, Eidskog, Sør-Odal, Nord-Odal, Grue, Åsnes, Våler	Innlandet	
Sør-Østerdal prosti	Åmot, Elverum, Trysil, Engerdal, Stor-Elvdal	Innlandet	
Nord-Østerdal prosti	Tynset, Alvdal, Folldal, Rendalen, Tolga, Os	Innlandet	
Nord-Gudbrandsdal prosti	Dovre, Lesja, Lom, Nord-Fron, Sel, Skjåk, Vågå	Innlandet	
Sør-Gudbrandsdal prosti	Gausdal, Lillehammer, Ringebu, Sør-Fron, Øyer	Innlandet	
Toten prosti	Gjøvik, Østre Toten, Vestre Toten	Innlandet	
Valdres prosti	Sør-Aurdal, Nord-Aurdal, Etnedal, Øystre Slidre, Vestre Slidre, Vang	Innlandet	
Hadeland og Land prosti	Gran, Søndre Land, Nordre Land	Innlandet	
Hadeland og Land prosti	Lunner	Akershus	
See also: List of churches in Hamar

== List of bishops ==
The following bishops have led the diocese since its creation in 1864:

- 1864–1887: Halvor Olsen Folkestad
- 1887–1906: Arnoldus Hille
- 1906–1917: Christen Brun
- 1917–1918: Otto Jensen
- 1918–1922: Gustav Johan Fredrik Dietrichson
- 1922–1934: Mikkel Bjønness-Jacobsen
- 1934–1942: Henrik Hille
- 1942–1943: Georg Falck-Hansen (appointed by Nasjonal Samling)
- 1943–1945: Sigurd Haga (appointed by Nasjonal Samling)
- 1945–1947: Henrik Hille
- 1947–1964: Kristian Schjelderup
- 1964–1974: Alexander Johnson
- 1974–1993: Georg Hille
- 1993–2006: Rosemarie Köhn
- 2006–2023: Solveig Fiske
- 2023–present: Ole Kristian Bonden
