= Alexander Lange Johnson =

Norwegian priest, resistance member during World War II and biographer

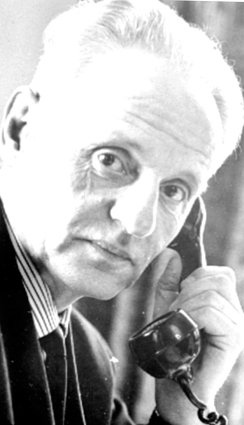
- Born: 26 October 1910; Antsirabe, Madagascar
- Died: 20 April 1989 (aged 78)
- Education: University of Oslo
- Occupation: Lutheran bishop

Alexander Lange Johnson (26 October 1910 – 20 April 1989) was a Norwegian priest, resistance member during World War II, bishop of Hamar, and biographer. He was born in Antsirabe, Madagascar. He played a leading role in the Norwegian civil resistance during the German occupation of Norway, being a member of the Coordination Committee, and later also Hjemmefrontens Ledelse. He was a bishop of the diocese of Hamar from 1964 to 1974. He wrote a biography on Eivind Berggrav in 1959.

Johnson completed his examen artium in 1928 at Oslo Cathedral School before studying theology at the University of Oslo, where he graduated in 1933.

== Selected bibliography ==
- Mann og kvinne skapte han dem (1939)
- Ugift ungdom (1940)
- Eivind Berggrav. Spenningens mann (1959)
- Veien er klar (1984)

Religious titles
Preceded by Kristian Schjelderup	Bishop of Hamar; 1964–1974	Succeeded by Georg Hille
