= Anders Platou Wyller =

Norwegian philologist and humanist

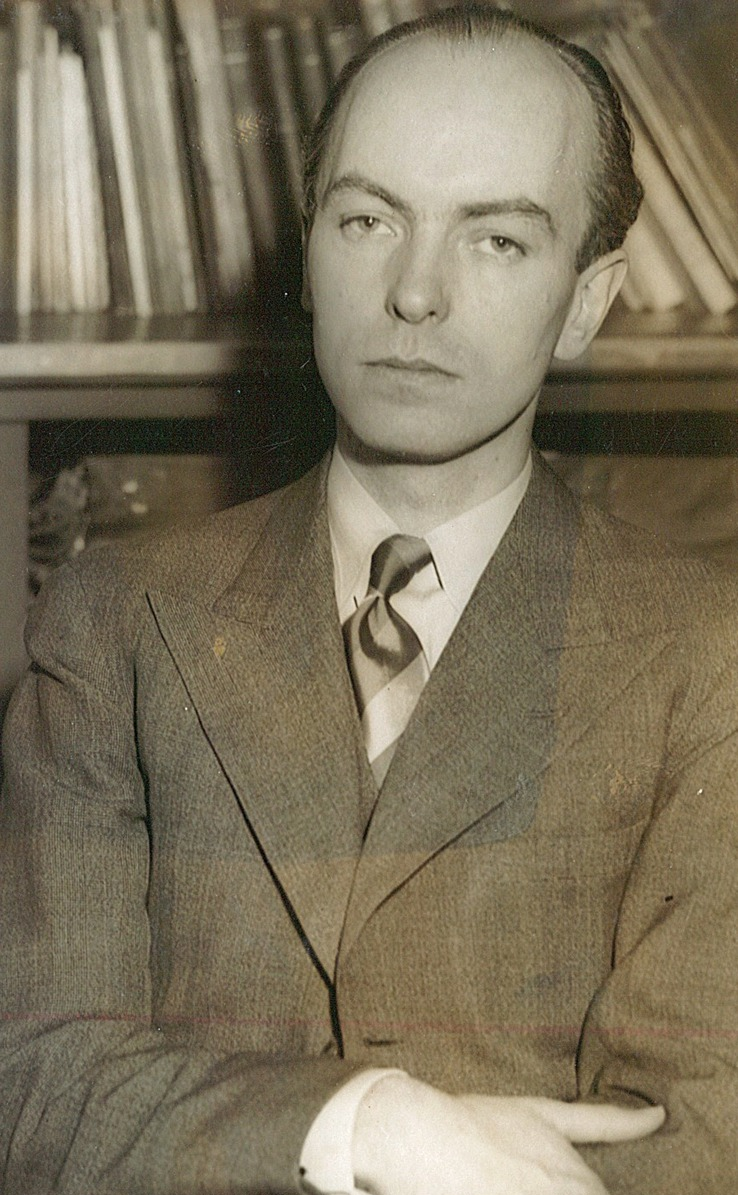
Anders Platou Wyller in the 1930s

Anders Platou Wyller (24 April 1903 - 2 October 1940) was a Norwegian philologist and humanist.

== Biography ==
Wyller was born at Stavanger in Rogaland, Norway. He was the son of Thomas Christian Wyller (1858-1921) and Birgitte Platou (1862-1922). His sister, Ingrid Wyller (1896-1994), was associated with the Norwegian Nurses Association and Norwegian Red Cross Nursing School in Oslo.

In 1922, he began studying at the University of Christiania from which he earned his cand.philol. in 1933. Between 1929 and 1936, he lived in Paris. From 1933 to 1936, Wyller was a lector in the Norwegian language at the University of Paris. He got his doctoral thesis in 1937 with Paul Claudel. En kristen dikter og hans drama. The same year he created the Nansenskolen (Norwegian Humanist Academy) together with Kristian Schjelderup and Henriette Bie Lorentzen.

After Operation Weserübung, Nazi Germany's assault on Denmark and Norway on April 9, 1940, Wyller applied to work with the allied forces and was sent for North Norway working for the radio. When the cruiser HMS Devonshire left Tromsø for England, Wyller was aboard with the Norwegian King Haakon VII, Crown Prince Olav and several members of the Norwegian cabinet. He worked a short time for BBC in London before he was diagnosed with cancer. He was returned by airplane to Sweden where he met his family before he died on 2 October 1940 and was buried at Vestre gravlund in Oslo.

== Works ==
- Paul Claudel: en kristen dikter og hans drama (Oslo: Aschehoug. 1936)
- Kjempende humanisme: artikler og taler (Oslo: Aschehoug. 1947)

== Personal life ==
He married Anne-Marie Strindberg (born 1902), daughter of the author August Strindberg and Harriet Bosse. They were the parents of two sons. Arne August Wyller (1927-2001) became a professor of astronomy.
