= Henrik Greve Hille =

Norwegian clergyman (1881–1946)

Bishop of the Diocese of Hamar Henrik Greve Hille
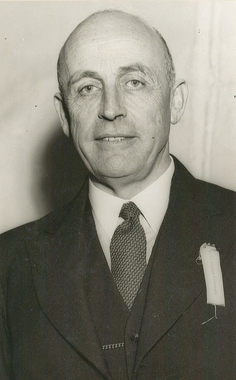

Personal details
- Born: 1 October 1881 Vang in Hedmark, Norway.
- Died: 31 May 1946 (aged 64)
- Denomination: Lutheran
- Parents: Arnoldus Hille (1829–1919); Charlotte Sofie Sandberg (1832-1875)
- Spouse: Ragna Erna Bjerke (1894-1990)
- Children: Arnoldus Hille (born 1919); Harald Hille (born 1921); Georg Hille (born 1923)
- Occupation: Priest

Henrik Greve Hille (1 October 1881 – 31 May 1946) was a Norwegian clergyman. He served as Bishop of the Diocese of Hamar from 1934 to 1942 and again from 1945 until 1946.

== Biography ==
He was born at Vang Municipality in Hedmark, Norway. He was the son of Arnoldus Hille and Charlotte Sofie Sandberg (1832-1875). His father served as bishop in the Diocese of Hamar from 1887 to 1906. He became cand.theol. in 1905. Hille worked as a teacher at Frogner School in Kristiania (now Oslo) from 1906 to 1913. He became an assistant priest at Oslo Cathedral during 1913. In 1918 he became a parish priest at Varteig Church (Varteig Kirke) in Sarpsborg. From 1926 to 1931 he was the resident chaplain at Oslo Cathedral.

He served as bishop at the Diocese of Hamar from 1934 to 1942. During the German occupation of Norway, he was expelled by the Nazi officials in December 1942 and was arrested in 1944. He was returned to the position as bishop after the liberation of Norway in 1945 and died the following year. He was buried at Vestre gravlund in Oslo.

== Personal life ==
Henrik Hille was married to Ragna Erna Bjerke (1894-1990). They were the parents of Arnoldus Marius Hille (born 1919) who became professor at the University of Bergen, Harald Hille (born 1921) who became an architect and Georg Hille (born 1923) who became bishop in Hamar from 1975 to 1993.

Religious titles
Preceded by Mikkel Bjønness-Jacobsen	Bishop of Hamar; 1934–1946 (Removed from office 1942-1945 during the Nazi occupation of Norway)	Succeeded by Kristian Schjelderup
