= Solveig Fiske =

Norwegian bishop (born 1952)

The Right Reverend Solveig Fiske
- Bishop of Hamar
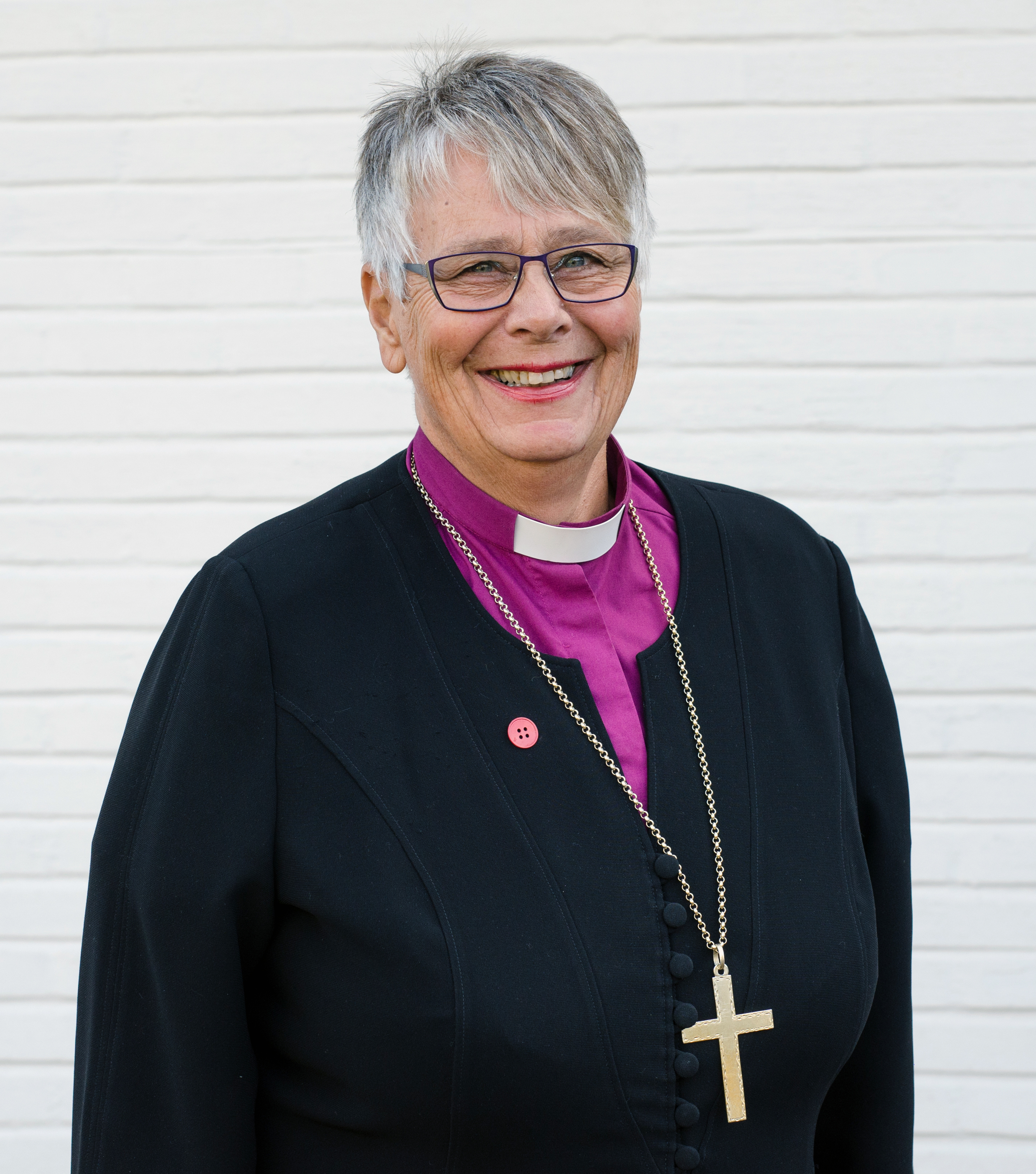
- Church: Church of Norway
- Diocese: Hamar
- Elected: 13 October 2006
- Installed: 17 December 2006
- Term ended: 31 October 2022
- Predecessor: Rosemarie Köhn
- Successor: Ole Kristian Bonden

Orders
- Consecration: 17 December 2006 by Olav Skjevesland

Personal details
- Born: Solveig Magrete Fiske; 26 October 1952 (age 73) Frei Municipality, Møre og Romsdal, Norway
- Denomination: Lutheran
- Spouse: Guttorm Eidslott
- Education: MF Norwegian School of Theology

Solveig Margrete Fiske (born 26 October 1952) is a theologian and bishop emerita in the Church of Norway, serving as the bishop of Hamar between 2006 and 2022, when she retired.

Originally from Frei Municipality in Møre og Romsdal, she graduated from the Free Faculty of Theology (now the MF Norwegian School of Theology) in 1980, and completed her practical examinations there in 1981. She briefly worked as a consultant for the Church Council in 1981, followed by an assignment to the parish for Elverum Municipality as a chaplain between 1982 and 1994. In 1994, she became the parish priest in Løten Municipality, a position she held for 12 years.

Fiske was consecrated as bishop of the Diocese of Hamar, the diocese encompassing both Elverum and Løten, on 17 December 2006. As bishop of Hamar, she succeeded the first female bishop in the church of Norway, Rosemarie Köhn, and became the fourth woman to be ordained bishop in Norway. Olav Skjevesland, bishop in the Diocese of Agder and Telemark, officiated at her consecration. On 25 December 2006, she went public with the view that the Church of Norway should develop a church liturgy for the establishment of same-sex partnerships. Following Norway's starting to certify same-sex marriages in 2009, the Church of Norway adopted a new liturgy suitable for wedding same-sex couples in 2017.

Fiske retired from active duty on 31 October 2022, after reaching the age limit of 70 years five days earlier.

== Appointments ==
In addition to her pastoral assignments, she has served in a number of committees and councils, notably:

- As member of the church council for the Diocese of Hamar
- The regional board in the Norwegian ministerial association
- Since 1982, as a member of the parish council for Løten and Elverum
- A number of church task forces related to the role of women in religious life
- Since 2004, chair of the board of the church's resource center against violence and sexual assault

Religious titles
Preceded by Rosemarie Köhn	Bishop of the Diocese of Hamar; 2006–present	Incumbent
