= Rosemarie Köhn =

Norwegian bishop (1939–2022)

The Right Reverend Rosemarie Köhn
- Bishop Emeritus of Hamar
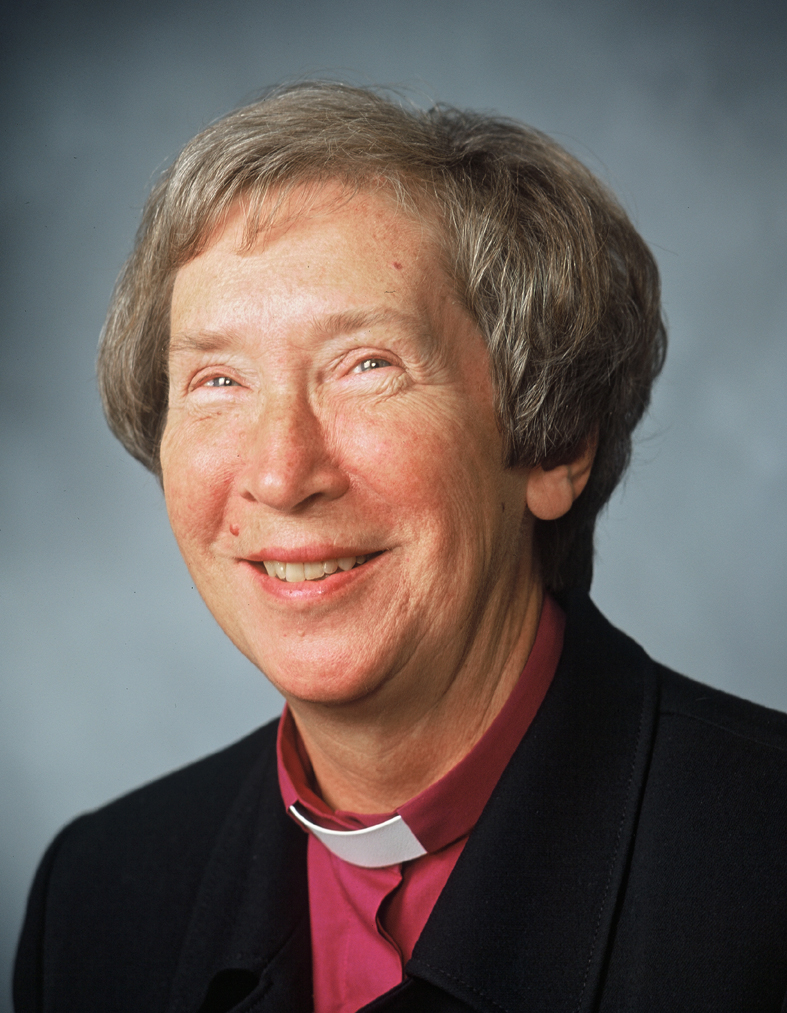
- Rosemarie Köhn. Photo: Kirkens informasjonsteneste
- Province: Diocese of Hamar, Church of Norway
- Installed: 20 May 1993
- Term ended: 1 November 2006
- Predecessor: Georg Hille
- Successor: Solveig Fiske

Personal details
- Born: 20 October 1939 Rathenow, Germany
- Died: 30 October 2022 (aged 83) Hamar, Norway
- Education: University of Oslo

Rosemarie Köhn (20 October 1939 – 30 October 2022) was a bishop of the Church of Norway, holding that position in the Diocese of Hamar from 20 May 1993 to 1 November 2006.

== Biography ==
Köhn was born to a German father and Norwegian mother and immigrated to Norway in 1946. She graduated from the University of Oslo with a degree in theology (candidata theologiæ) in 1966. Köhn worked as an assistant professor in Biblical Theology at the University of Oslo from 1976 to 1989, and principal of the Practical-Theological Seminary from 1989 to 1993.

Köhn was the first lesbian priest before she became the bishop Diocese in Norway.

In 1993, she was appointed bishop of the Diocese of Hamar, making her the first woman to hold the position of bishop in the Church of Norway. She stepped down from office on 1 November 2006 and was succeeded by Solveig Fiske. In 2004, in recognition of her work for the church, she was appointed a Commander of the Royal Norwegian Order of St. Olav by King Harald V.

Köhn was married to Susanne Sønderbo. Köhn died after a long-term illness on 30 October 2022, at the age of 83.

Religious titles
Preceded by Georg Hille	Bishop of Hamar; 1993–2006	Succeeded by Solveig Fiske
