= Ringsaker Church =

Church in Innlandet, Norway

- Ringsaker kirke
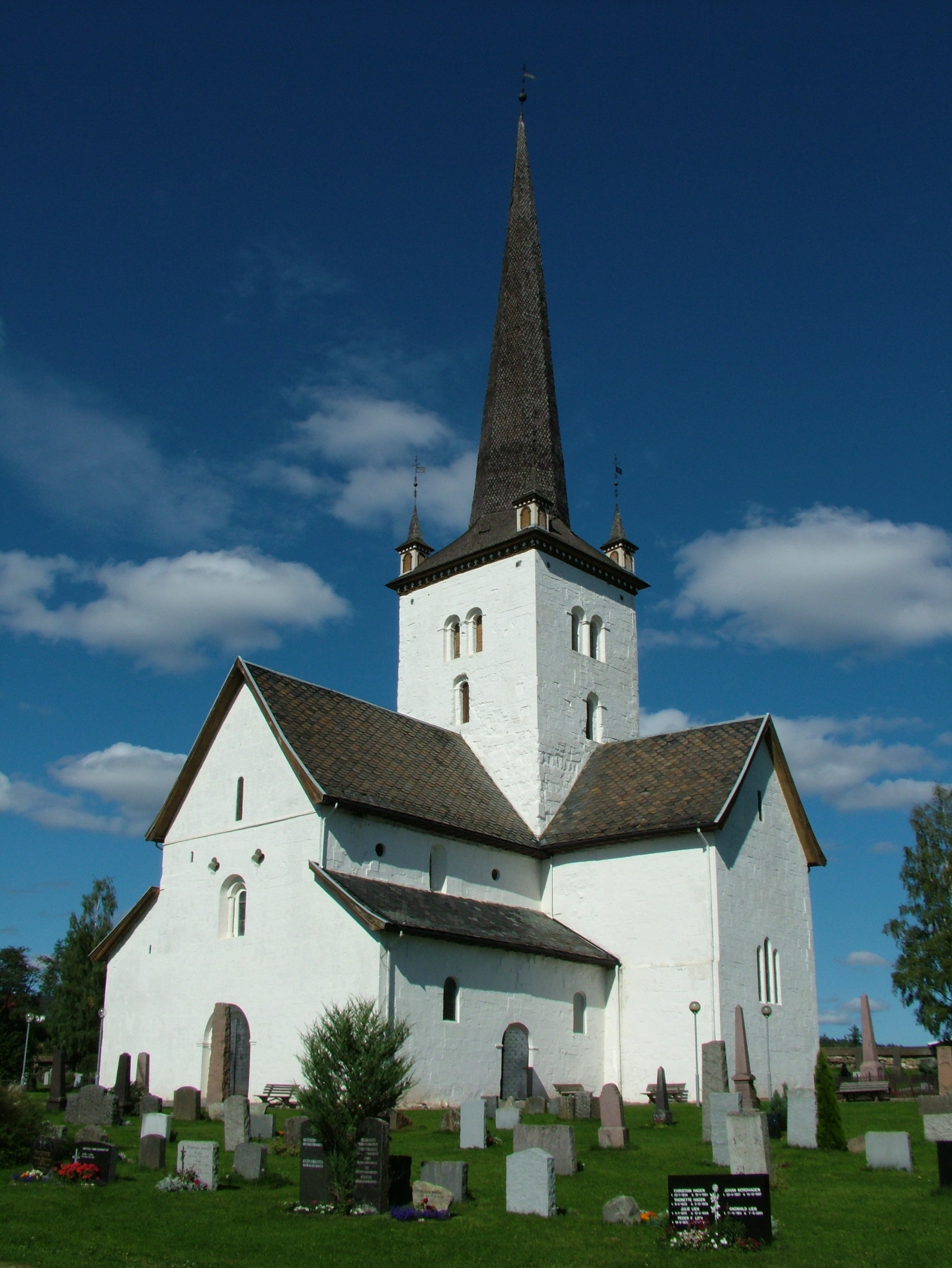
- View of the church
- Ringsaker Church
- 60°54′10″N 10°43′29″E
- Location: Ringsaker Municipality, Innlandet
- Country: Norway
- Denomination: Church of Norway
- Previous denomination: Catholic Church
- Churchmanship: Evangelical Lutheran

History
- Status: Parish church
- Founded: c. 1130
- Consecrated: c. 1130

Architecture
- Functional status: Active
- Architectural type: Cruciform
- Completed: c. 1130 (896 years ago)

Specifications
- Capacity: 300
- Materials: Stone

Administration
- Diocese: Hamar bispedømme
- Deanery: Ringsaker prosti
- Parish: Ringsaker
- Norwegian Cultural Heritage Site
- Type: Church
- Status: Automatically protected
- ID: 85297

Ringsaker Church (Norwegian: Ringsaker kirke) is a parish church of the Church of Norway in Ringsaker Municipality in Innlandet county, Norway. It is located in the village of Moelv. It is the church for the Ringsaker parish which is part of the Ringsaker prosti (deanery) in the Diocese of Hamar. The white, stone church was built in a cruciform design around the year 1130 using plans drawn up by an unknown architect. The church seats about 300 people.

== History ==
The church in Ringsaker was built in the 12th century, possibly around the year 1130 or a little earlier. Ringsaker church is one of the best kept medieval stone churches in Norway, which has most of the original medieval features intact. The Romanesque stone church originally had a long church design with a small choir and a large tower above the centre of the nave (the tower did not have a tall spire, however). In the late 1200s, the church was expanded and given a lot of Gothic features. The choir was enlarged to the east and the nave was expanded by adding transept wings to the north and south, creating a cruciform floor plan. Interestingly, the north wing is longer than the south wing. A large sacristy was built on the north side of the choir. In 1594, a man named Matz Tårnbygger built a spire on top of the stone tower. In 1652, Werner Olsen, the famous builder, constructed a new tower and spire. On 22 September 1669, the tower blew down in a storm. The church sat without a spire for many years until 1694 when Oluf Iversen Helmen built a new 64-metre (210 ft) tall spire.

The church has Norway’s third largest collection of stone grave memorials from the medieval times, the majority of these are found inside the church.

In 1814, this church served as an election church (Norwegian: valgkirke). Together with more than 300 other parish churches across Norway, it was a polling station for elections to the 1814 Norwegian Constituent Assembly which wrote the Constitution of Norway. This was Norway's first national elections. Each church parish was a constituency that elected people called "electors" who later met together in each county to elect the representatives for the assembly that was to meet at Eidsvoll Manor later that year.

== Media gallery ==
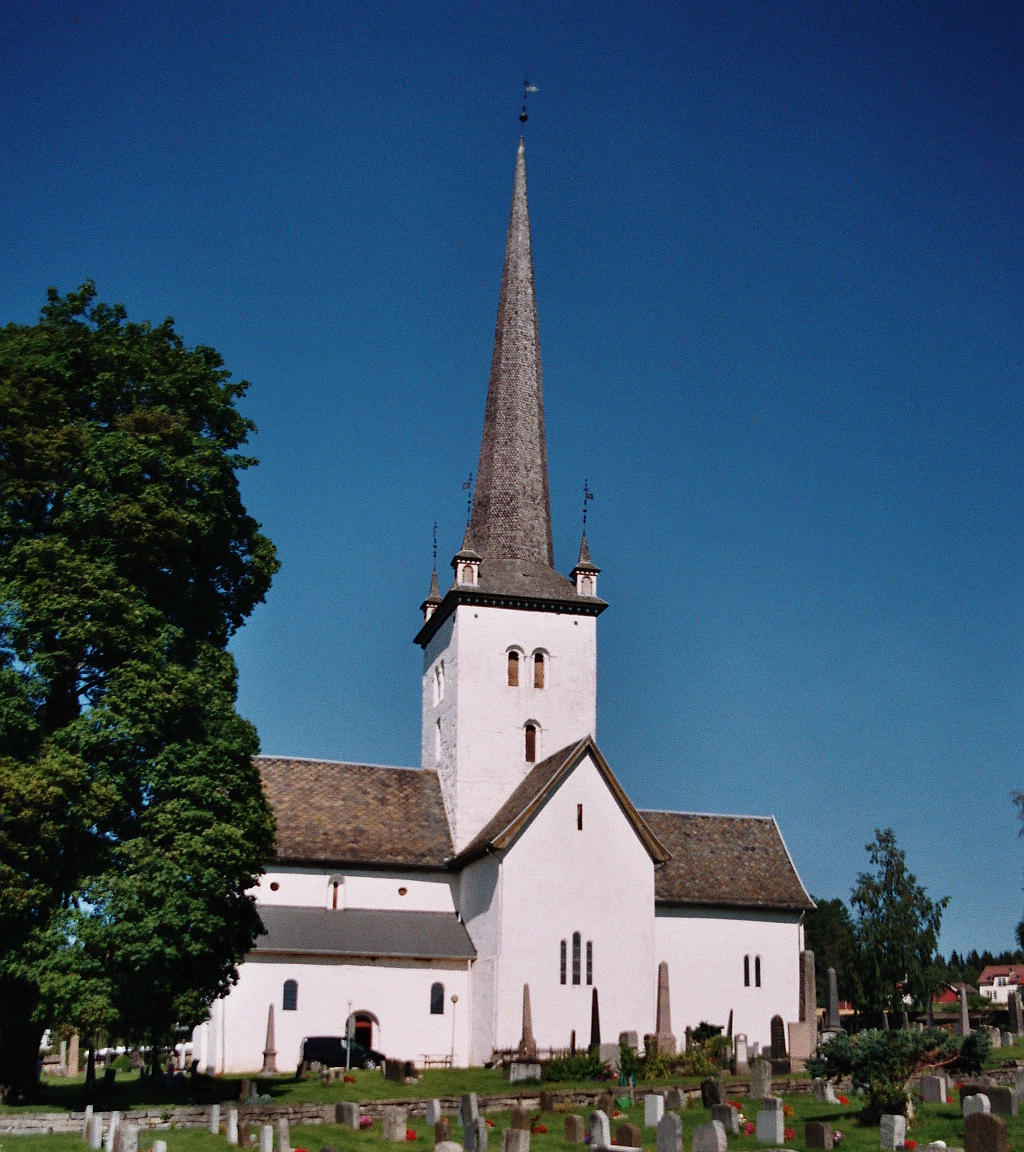

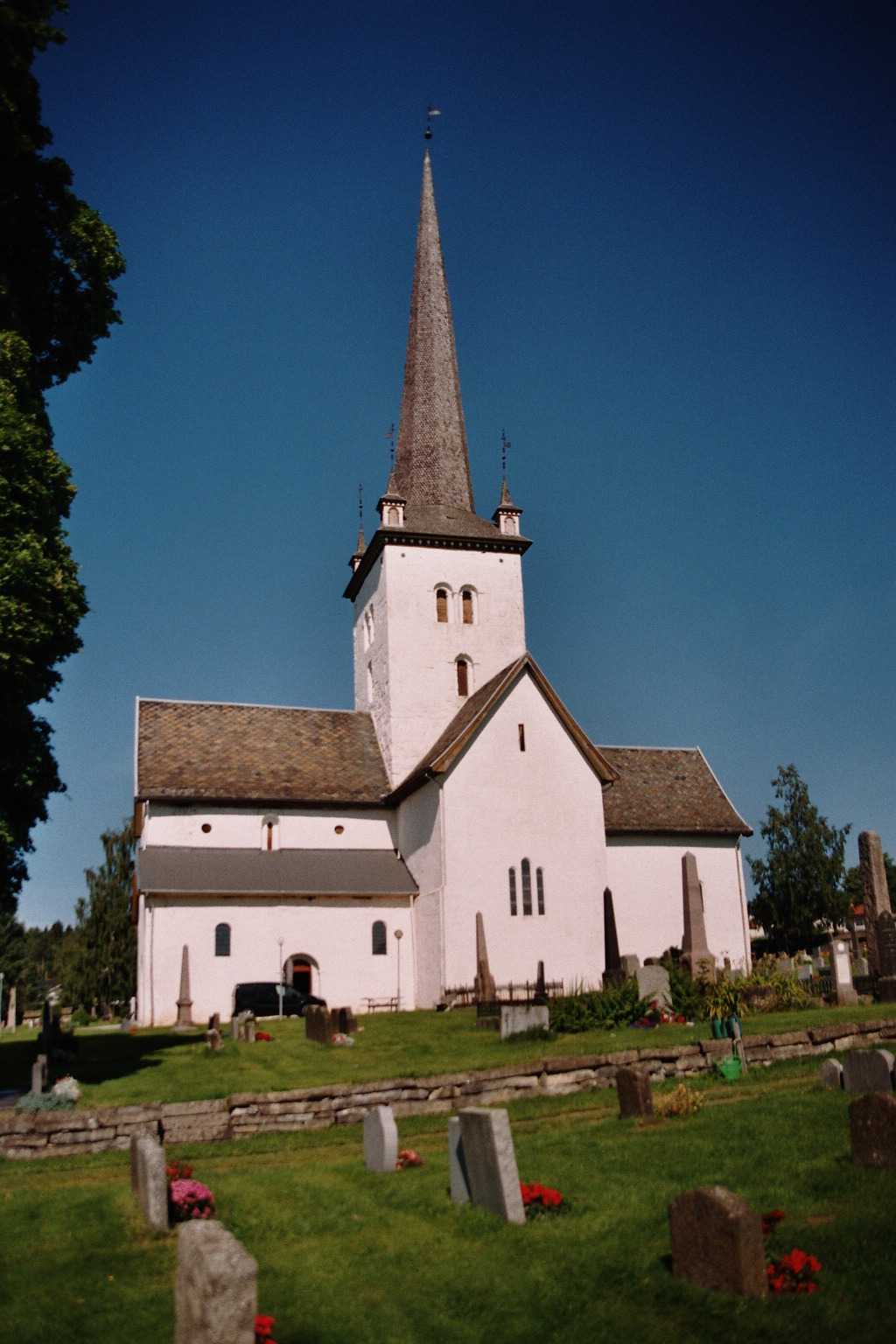

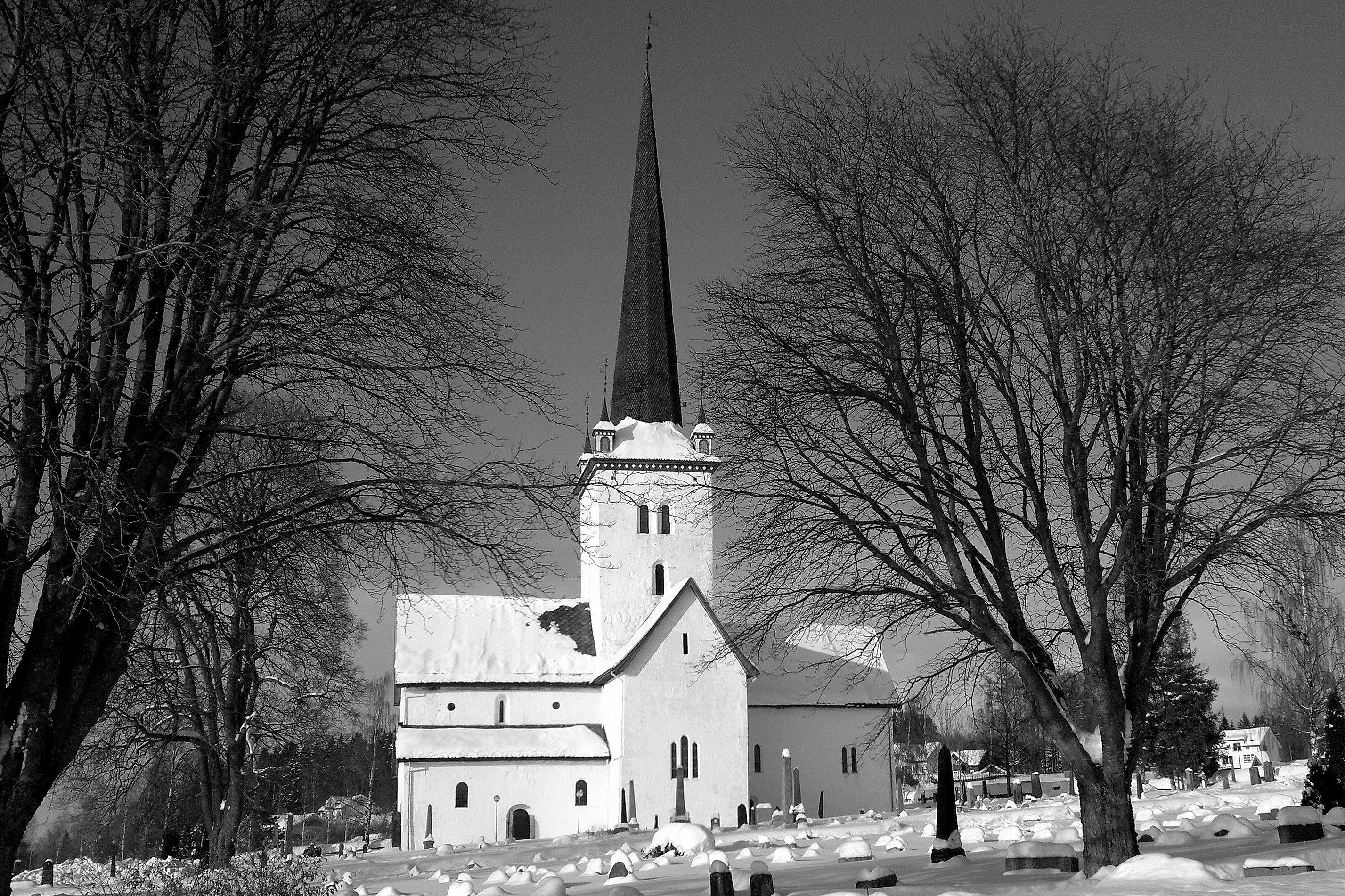

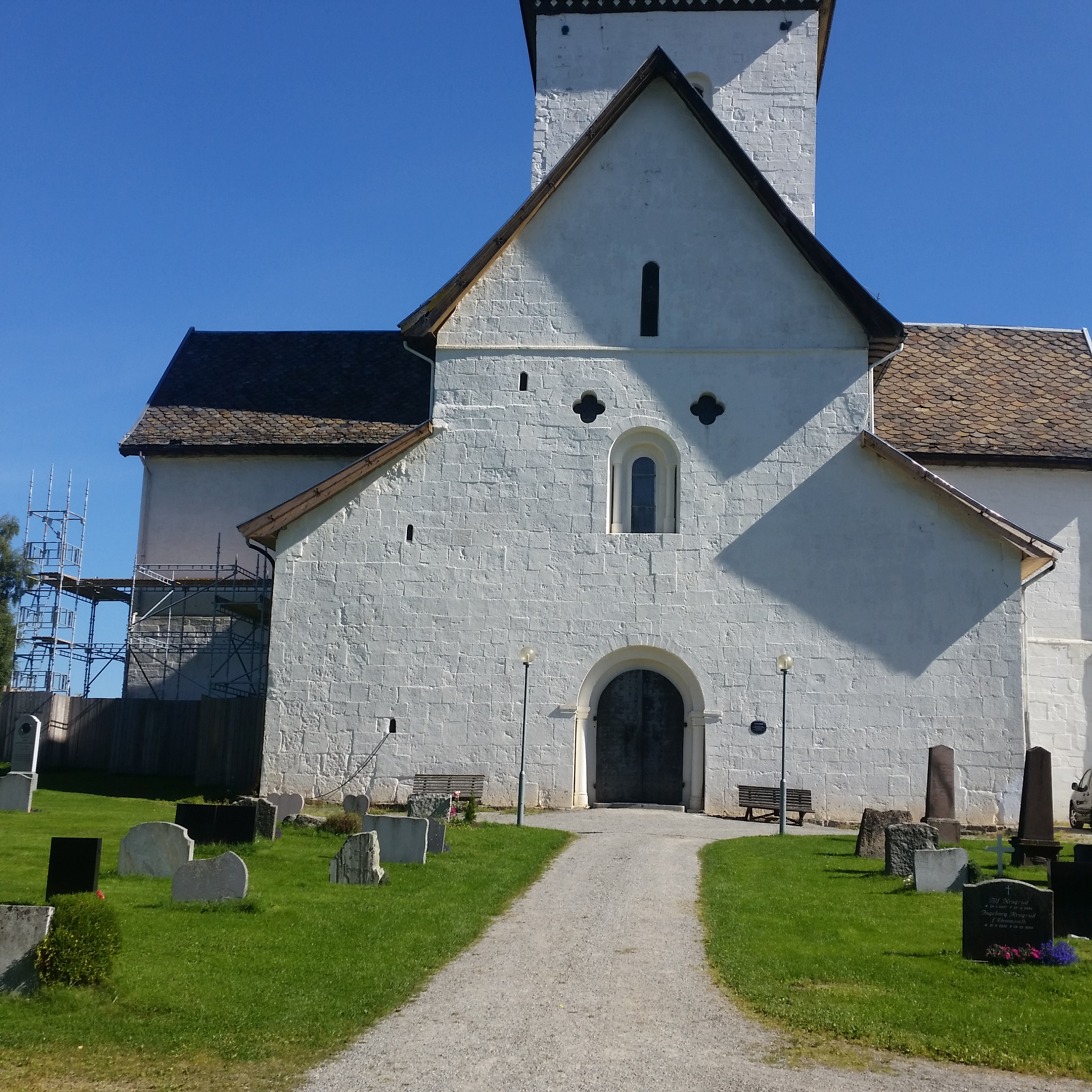

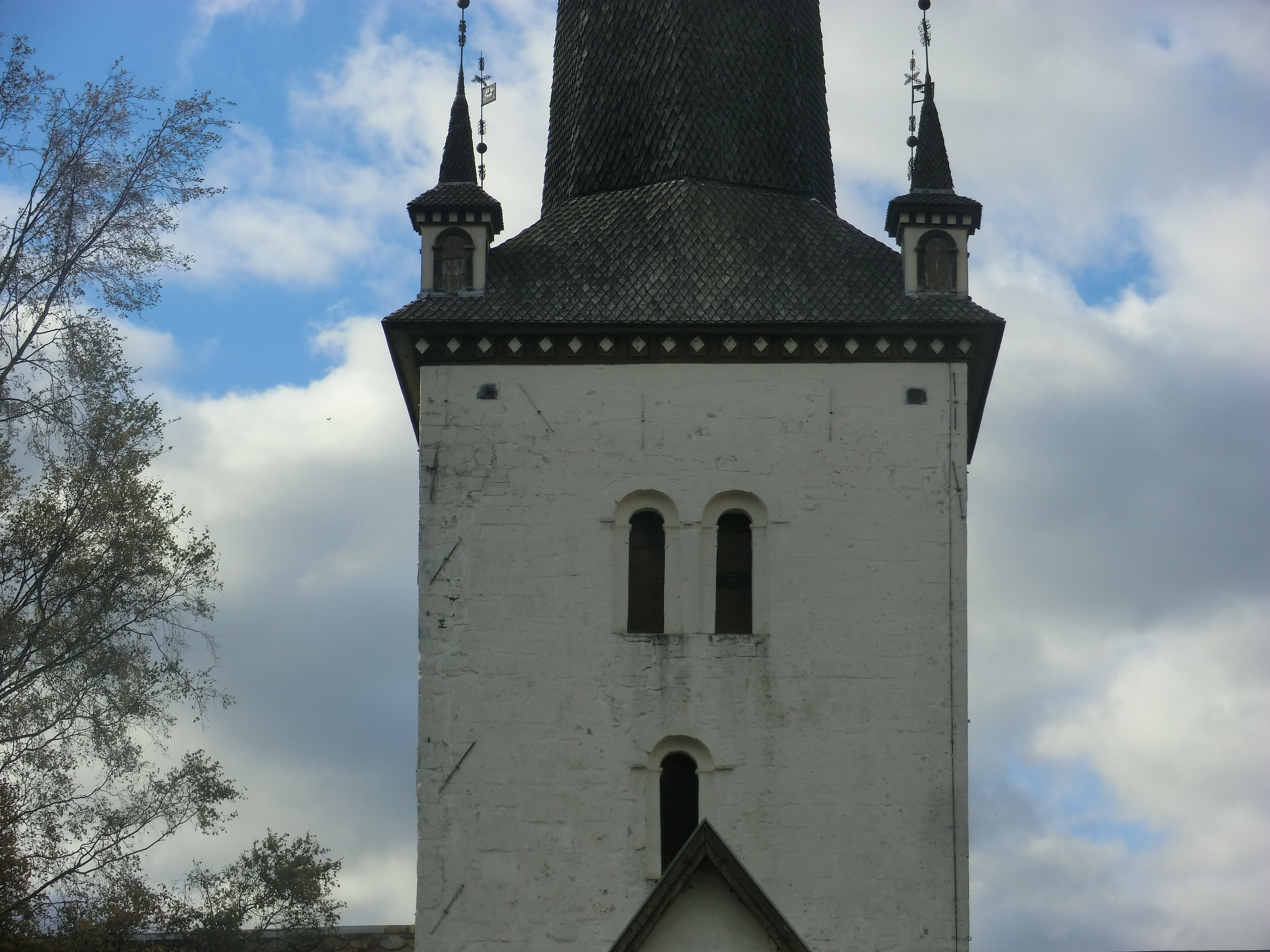

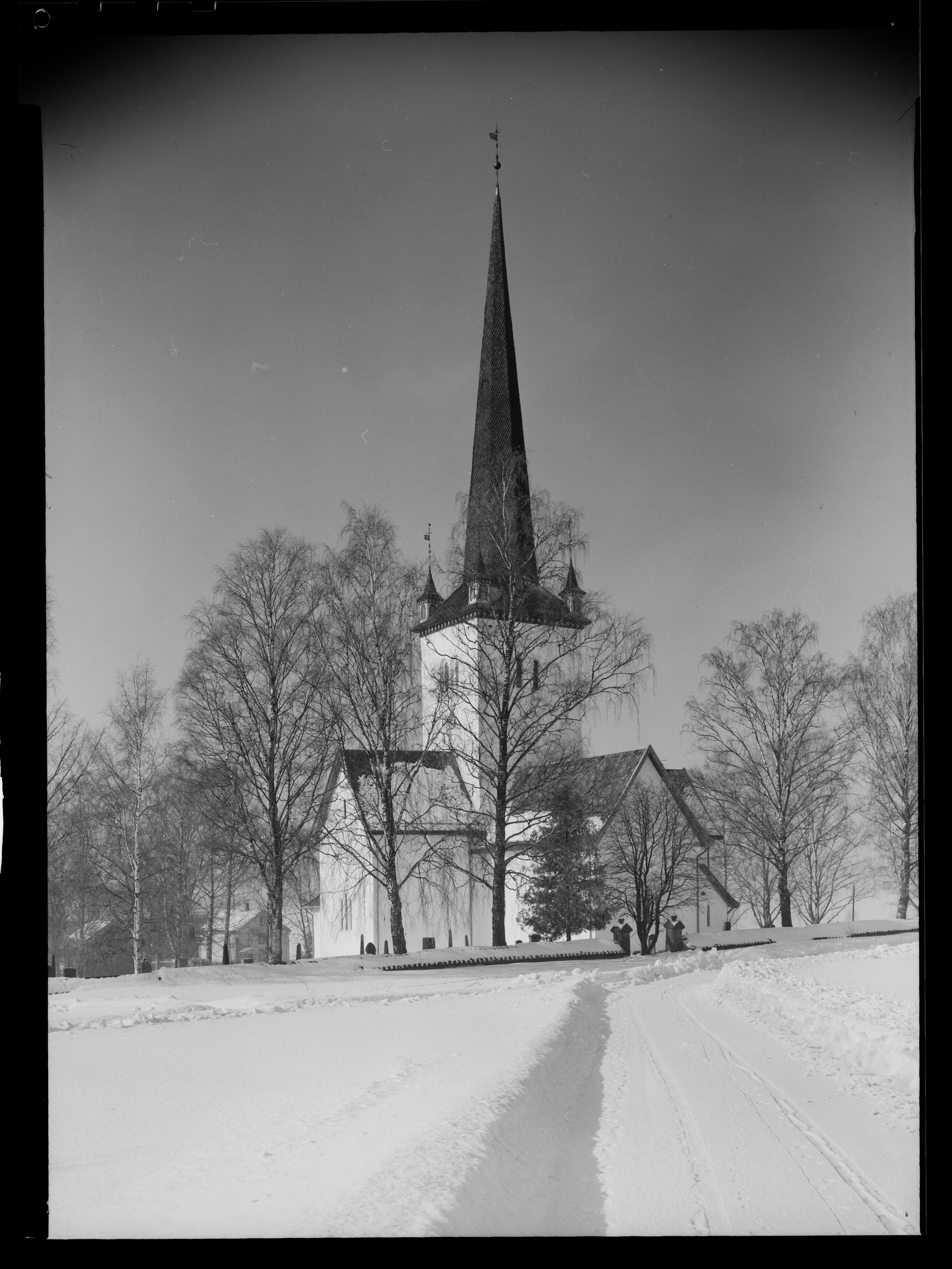

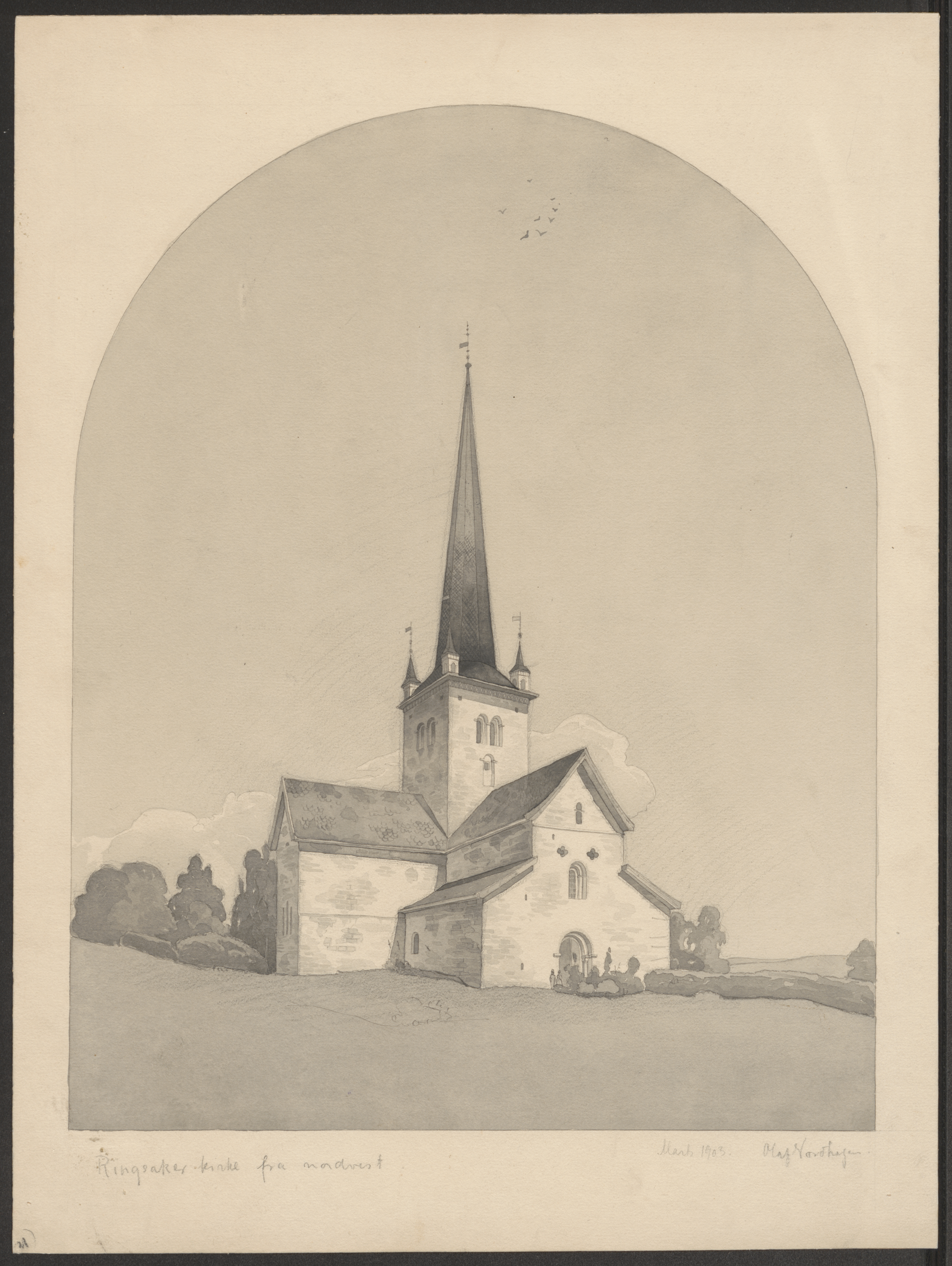

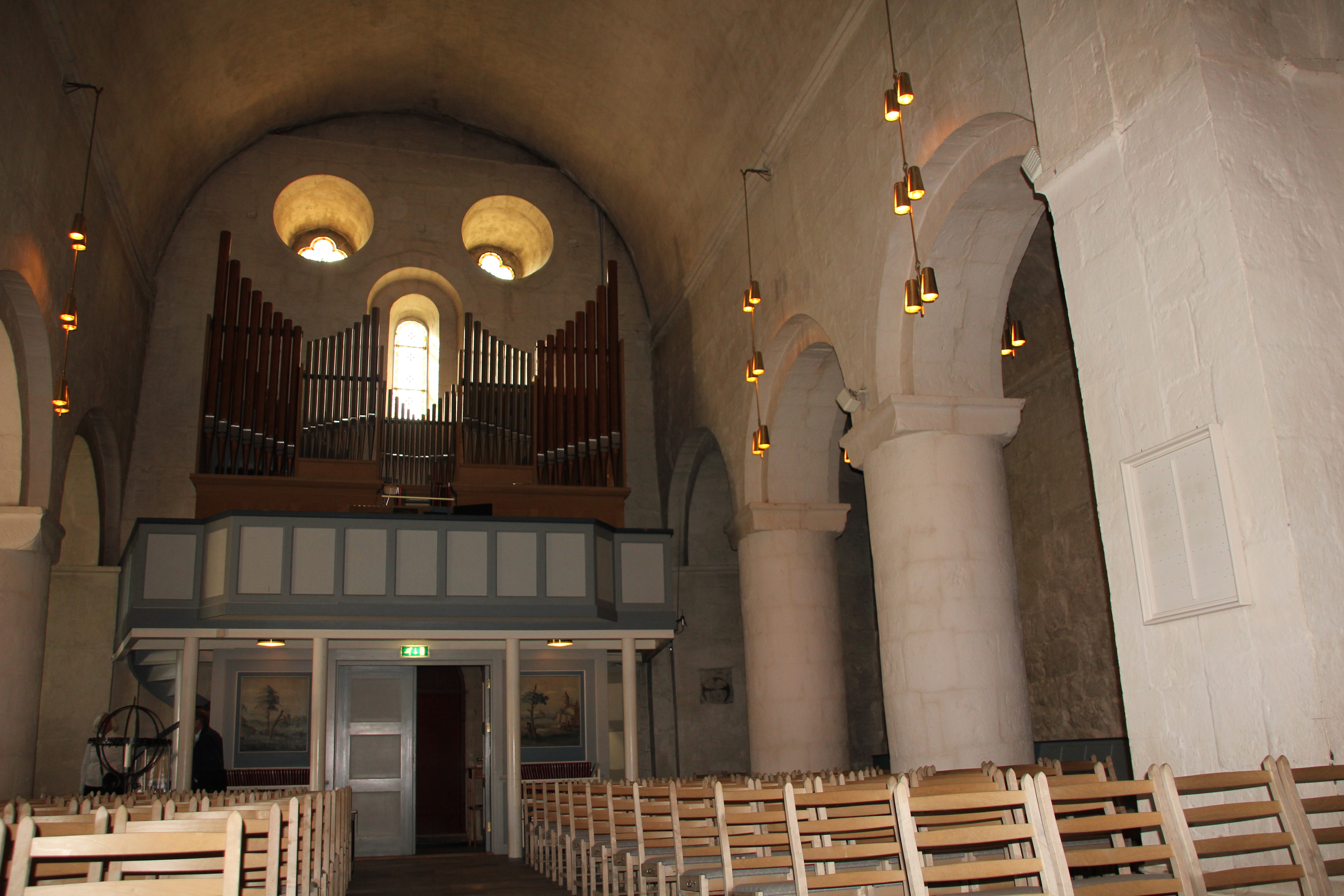

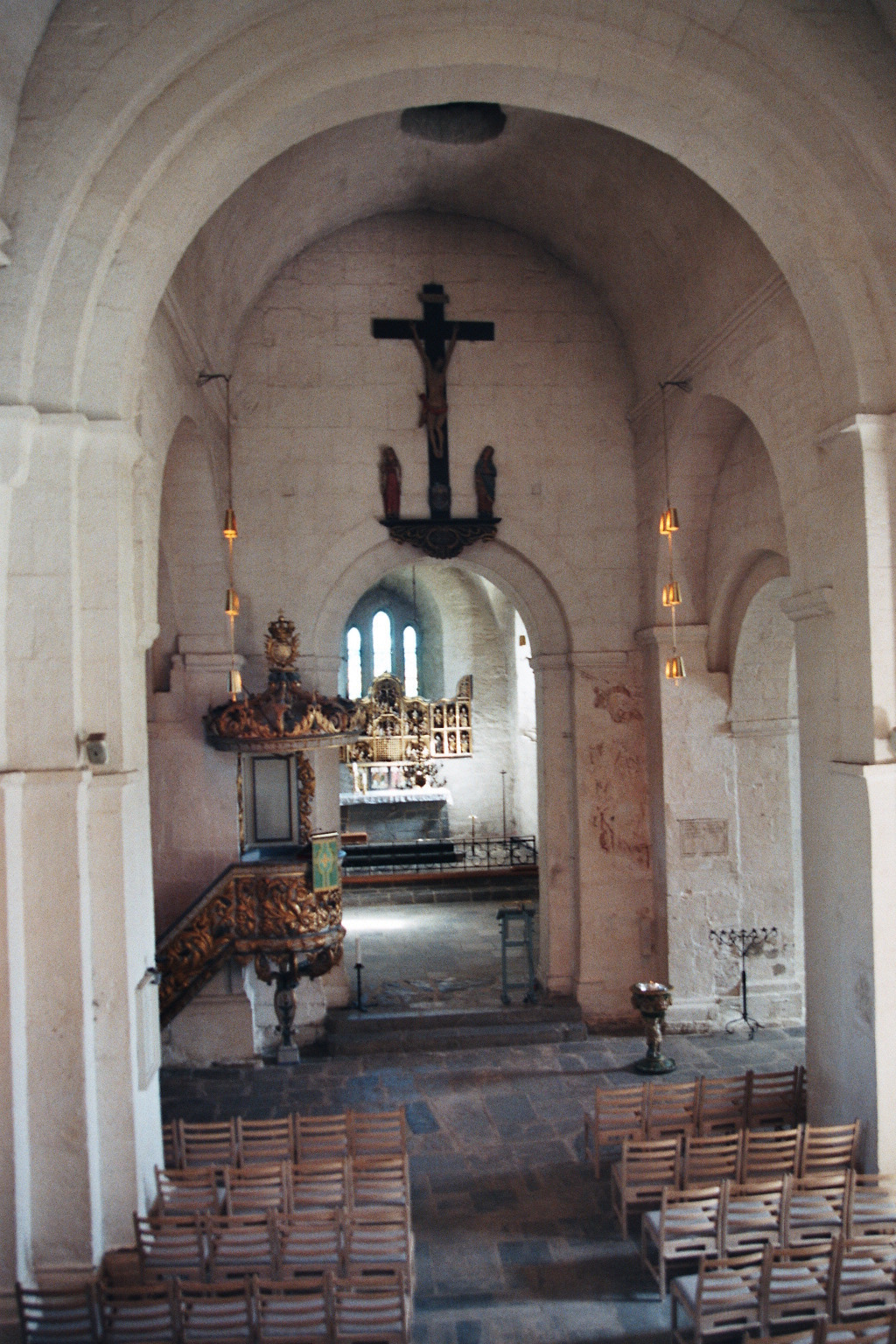

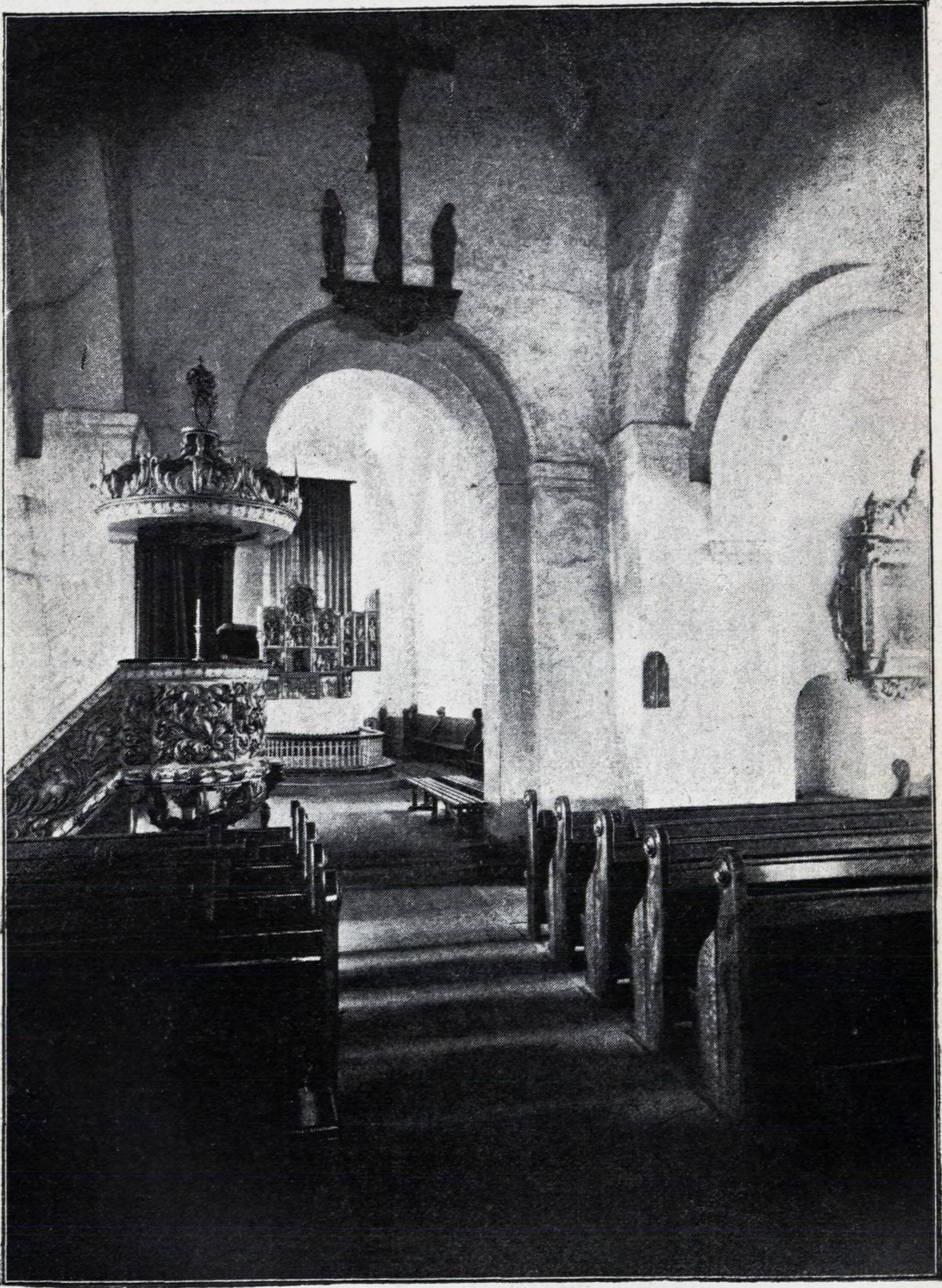

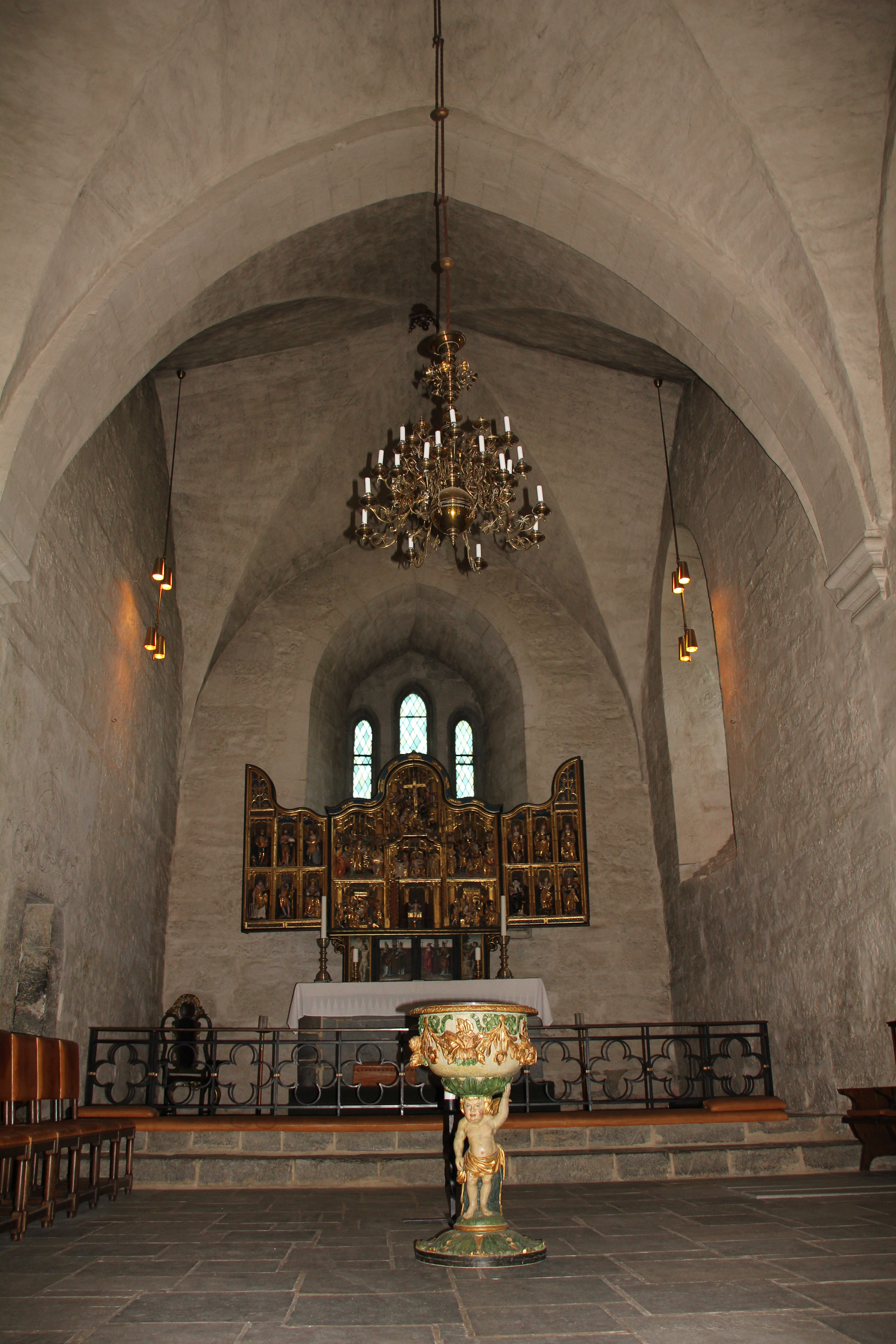

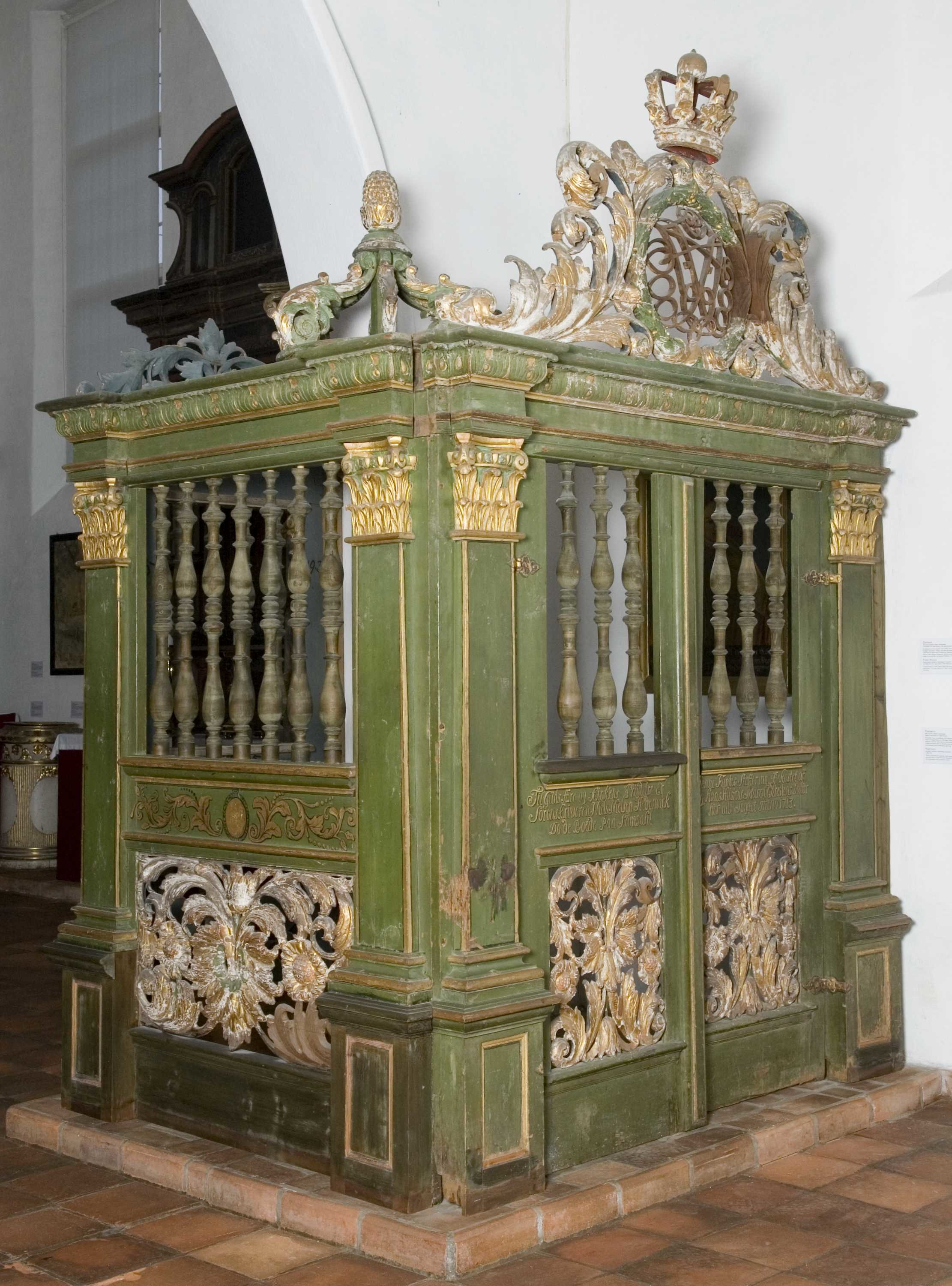

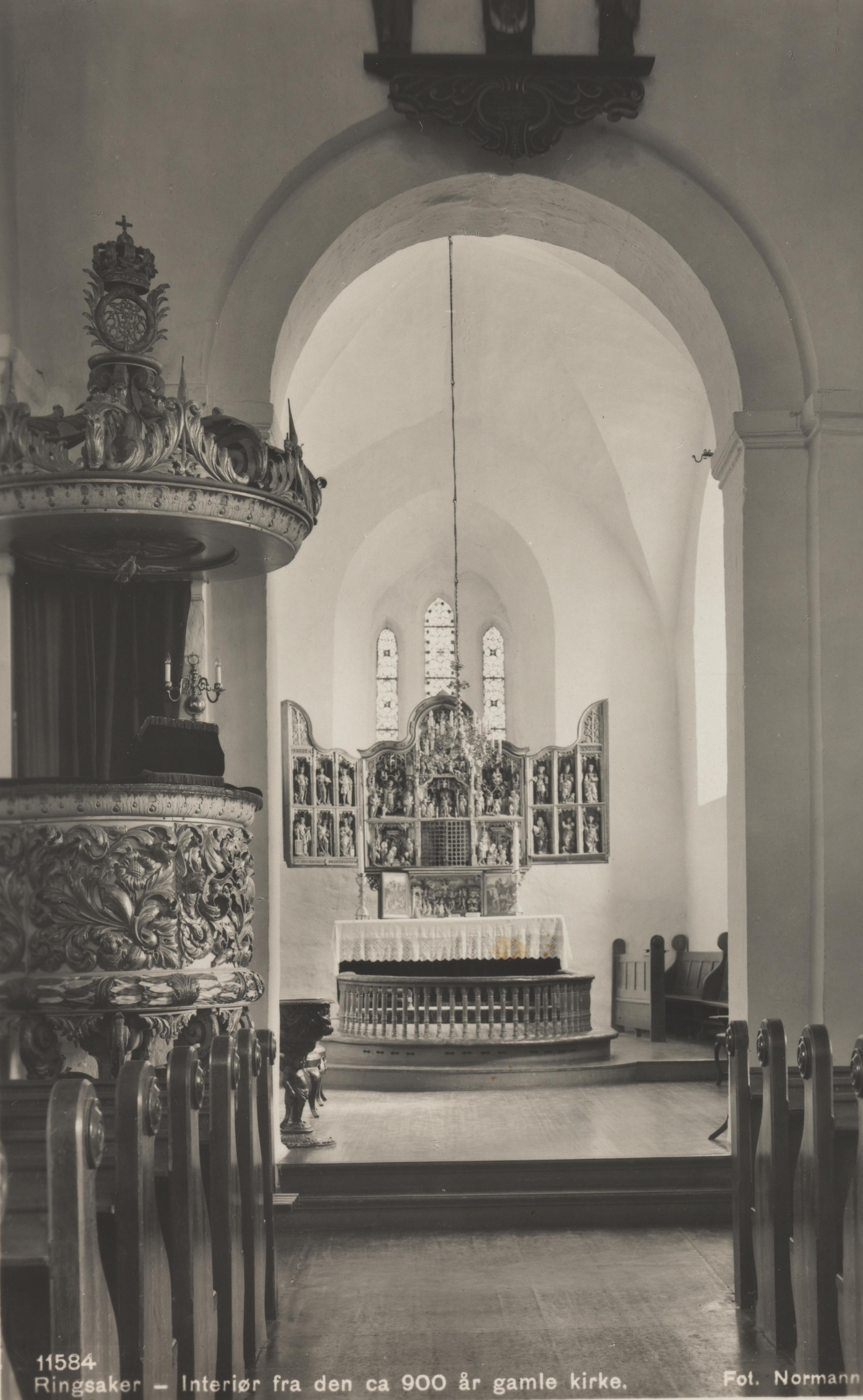

== See also ==
- List of churches in Hamar
