= Hamar Cathedral =

- Hamar domkirke
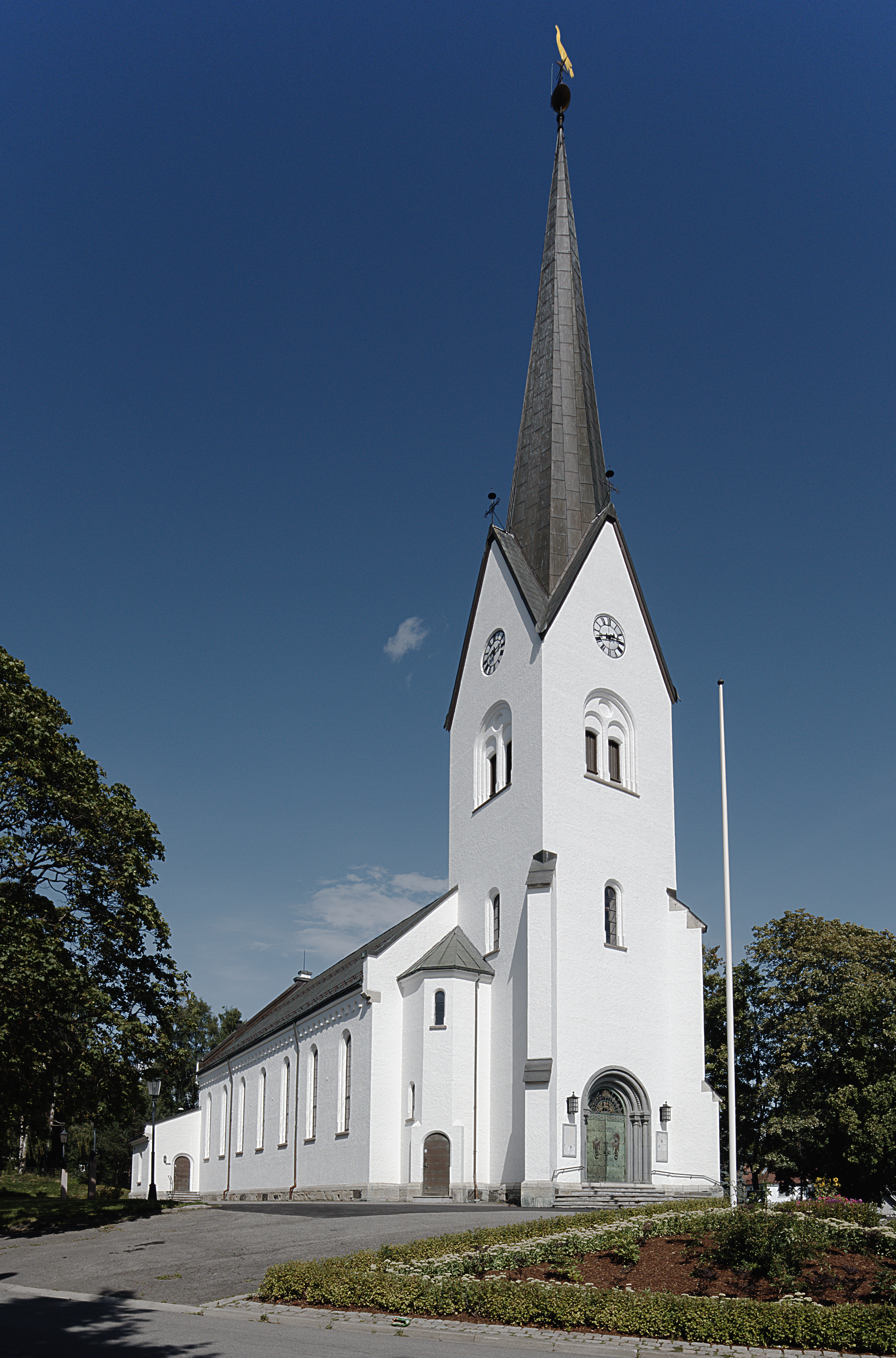
- View of the church
- Hamar Cathedral
- 60°47′48″N 11°04′06″E
- Location: Hamar Municipality, Innlandet
- Country: Norway
- Denomination: Church of Norway
- Churchmanship: Evangelical Lutheran
- Website: www.kirken-hamar.no

History
- Status: Cathedral
- Founded: 1866
- Consecrated: 15 December 1866

Architecture
- Functional status: Active
- Architect: Heinrich Ernst Schirmer
- Architectural type: Long church
- Completed: 1866 (160 years ago)

Specifications
- Capacity: 380
- Materials: Brick

Administration
- Diocese: Hamar bispedømme
- Deanery: Hamar domprosti
- Parish: Hamar

Clergy
- Bishop: Solveig Fiske
- Dean: Leif Jørn Hvidsten
- Pastor: Per Erik Stave Engdal
- Norwegian Cultural Heritage Site
- Type: Church
- Status: Protected
- ID: 84471

Hamar Cathedral (Norwegian: Hamar domkirke) is the episcopal seat of the Diocese of Hamar within the Church of Norway. The cathedral is located in the town of Hamar which is in Hamar Municipality in Innlandet county, Norway. It is one of the churches for the Hamar parish which is part of the Hamar domprosti (deanery) in the Diocese of Hamar. The whitewashed brick church was built in a long church design in 1866 using plans drawn up by the architect Heinrich Ernst Schirmer. The church seats about 380 people.

== History ==
For several centuries, the Catholic Church ran the Old Hamar Cathedral in the town of Hamar. This cathedral was constructed from 1152 to 1200 and it served as the seat of the old Roman Catholic Diocese of Hamar until the Protestant Reformation. After the Reformation, the diocese was closed and the cathedral was used as a regular parish church within the Diocese of Christiania. The church remained in existence until 1567 when it was burned down by the Swedish Army during the Northern Seven Years' War. After that time, the people of Hamar had to worship at the nearby Vang Church in Ridabu.

For a long time, Hamar had no church. In 1849, Hamar re-gained its historic status as a town. In 1864, the Diocese of Christiania was divided and the northern part became the new Diocese of Hamar. The new diocese was in need of a cathedral, so plans were made to build a new cathedral in Hamar. The architect of the new whitewashed brick cathedral was Heinrich Ernst Schirmer and the local general contractor was Herman Frang. The exterior was built in simple, nearly austere German Romanesque style. Construction took place from 1864 to 1866. The cathedral was consecrated for services on 15 December 1866.

In the 1920s, several changes were made to the interior. During the 1930s, electricity and water and sewage were installed. The exterior of the church received a facelift in the late autumn of 1949, when the plaster was restored in connection with the city's centennial celebrations. In 1950, bishop Kristian Schjelderup called for a significant internal renovation. Arnstein Arneberg was commissioned as architect: his design called for the interior to be almost completely gutted. All that remains from the earlier set-up are the supporting structure for the organ loft, the baptismal font and two silver candlestick holders. Arneberg simplified the visual look of the building, particularly in changing the ceiling trusses, which were previously the church's foremost visual decoration. The walls were made clean and white. In the choir, the trusses were completely hidden, while the roof of the nave was given a raised middle part similar to a basilica. The new interior was opened on 9 May 1954.

== Interior ==
The interior is characterized by an elevated nave, inspired by the basilica structure. The windows are decorated with fabric-like paintings, possibly based on medieval tapestries. The central feature is the altar, which is possibly the most unusual feature of the cathedral. Henrik Sørensen's depiction of the resurrected Jesus Christ was inspired by a Nordic archetype. On the side panels, Sørensen depicted the anxious mother and Hans Nielsen Hauge's awakening. The ceiling was painted by Arve Hagen. The pulpit and the bar in front of the sanctuary were carved by Anthon Røvik. The pulpit includes a depiction of Francis of Assisi.

== Media gallery ==
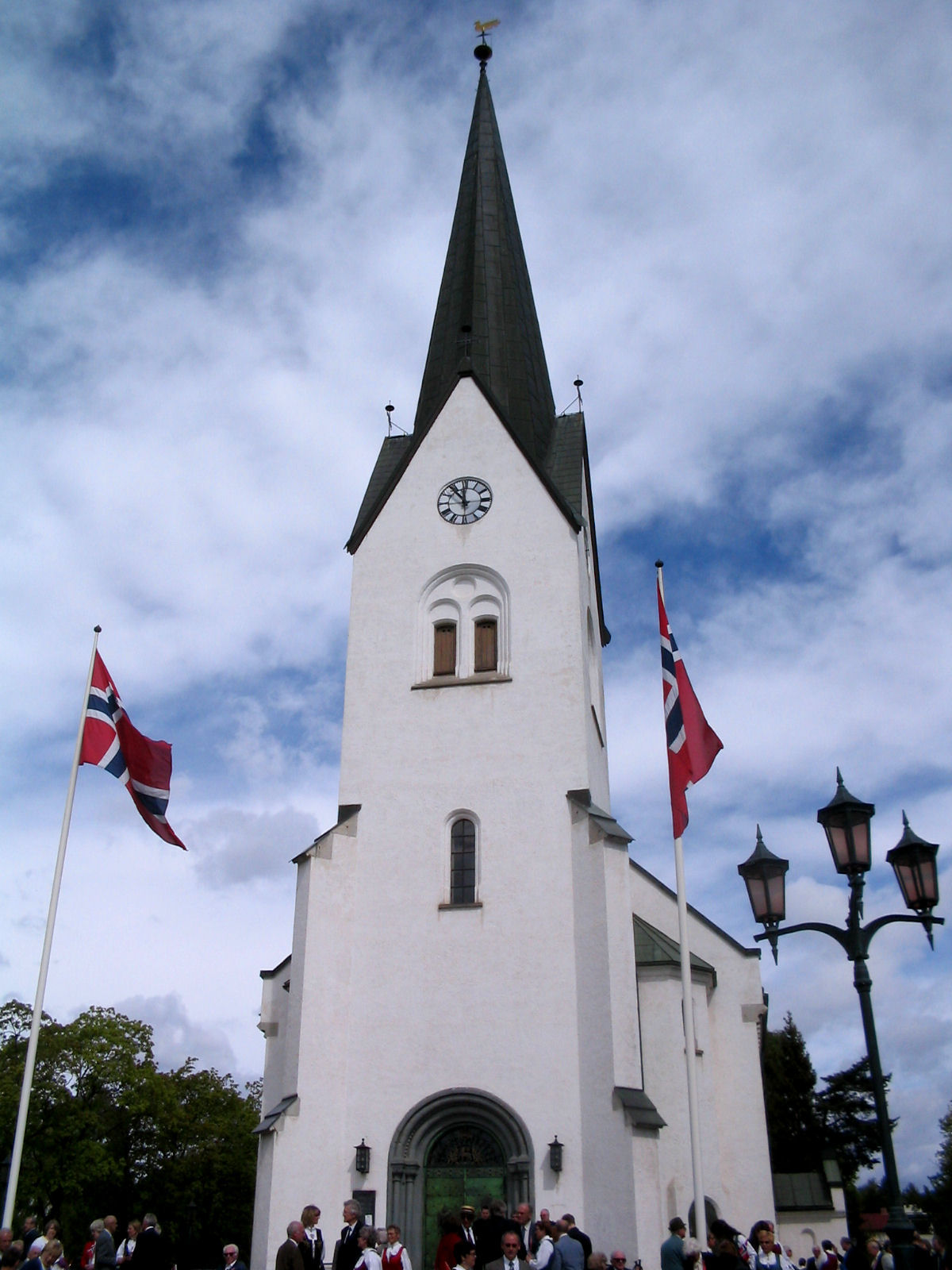

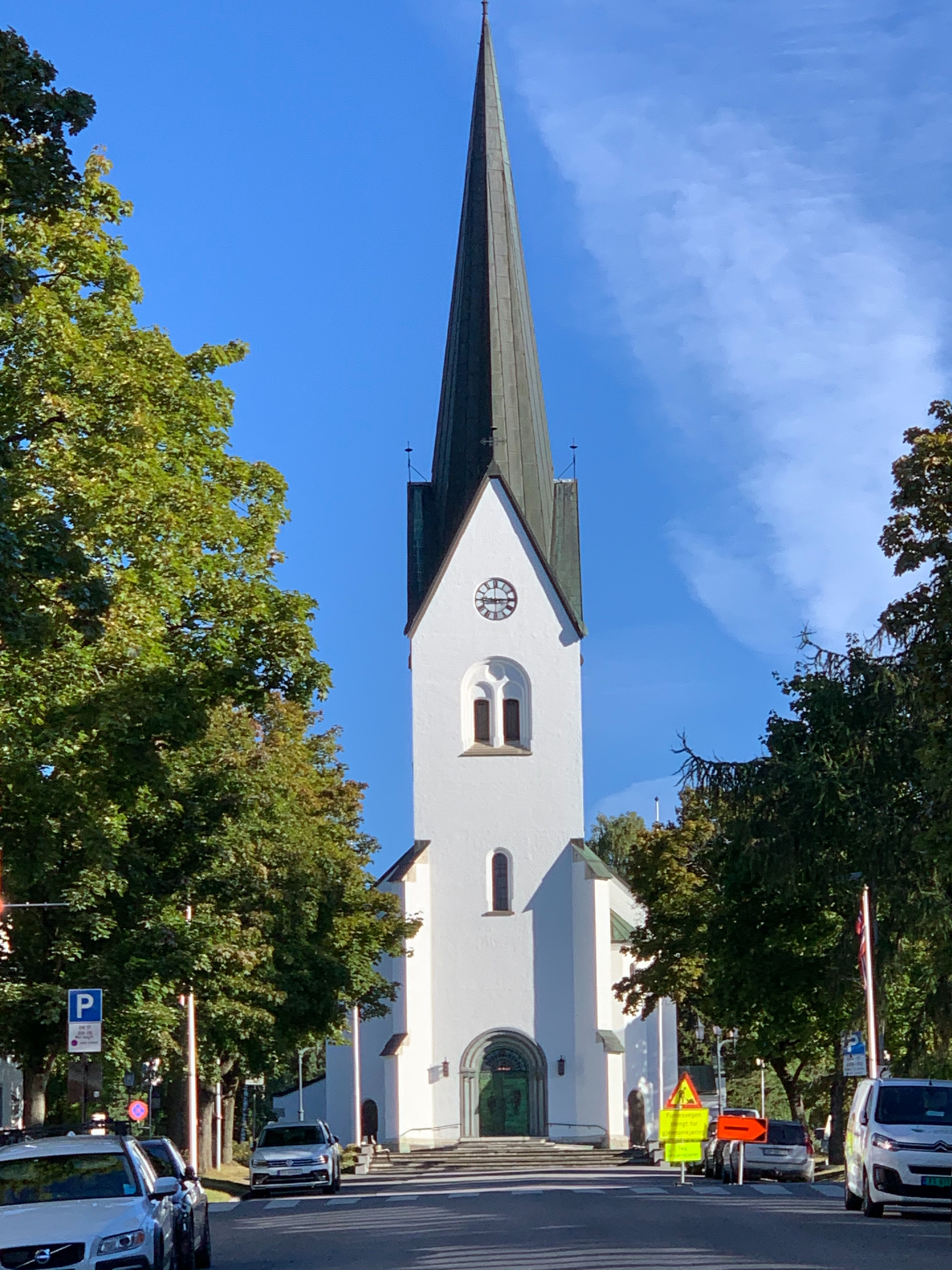

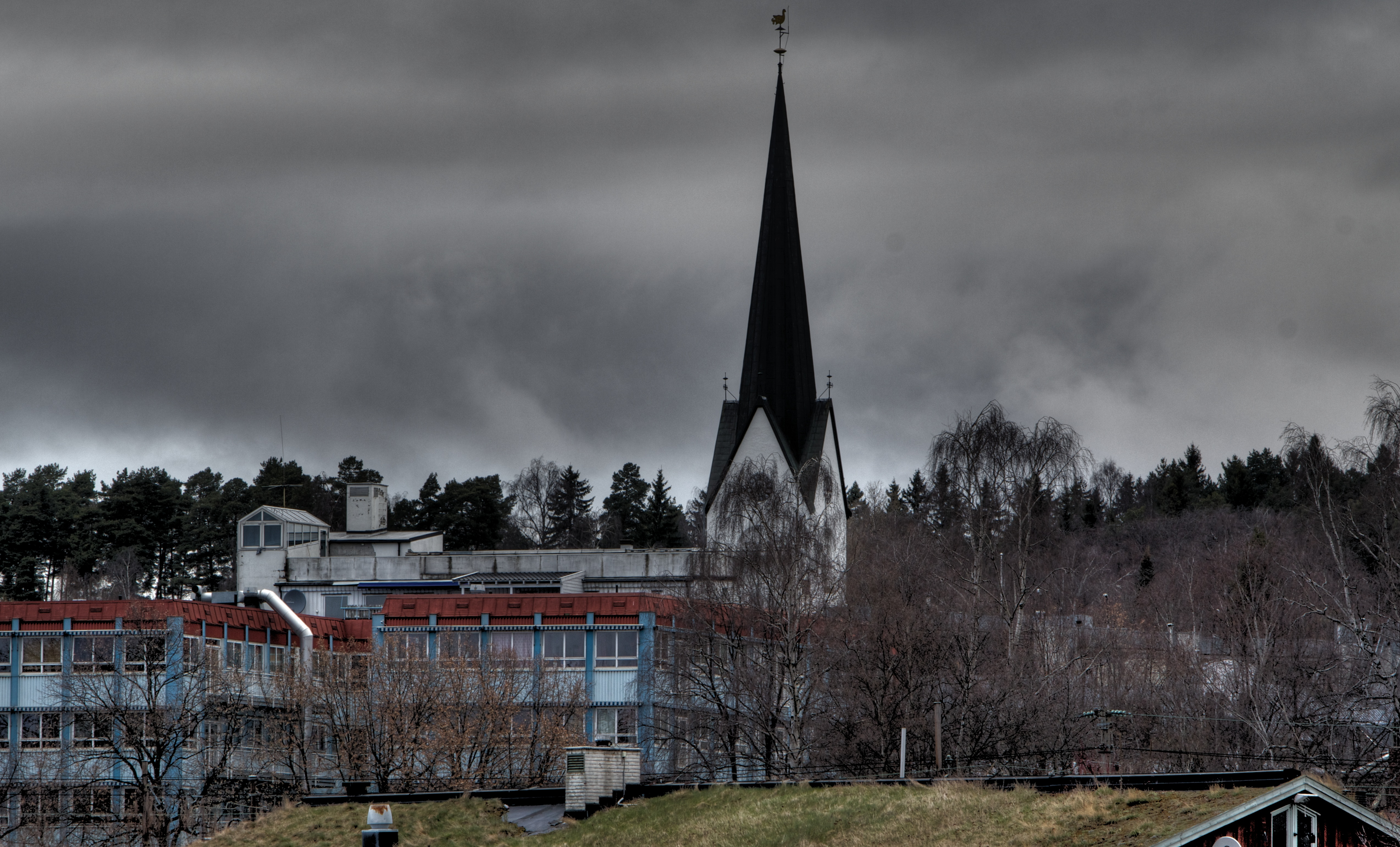

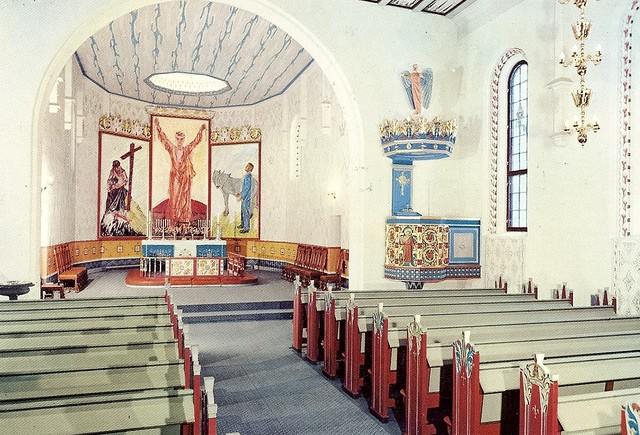

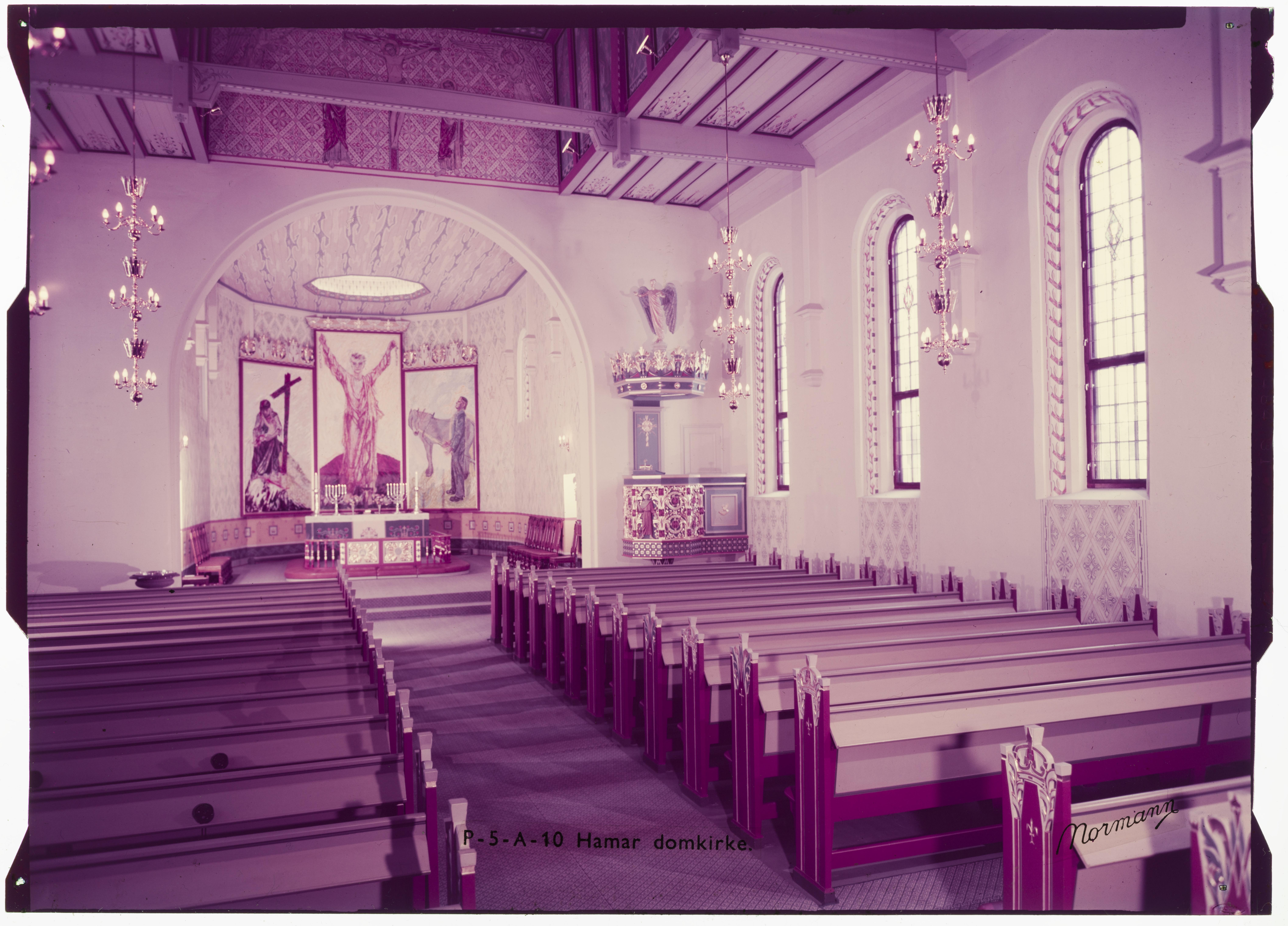

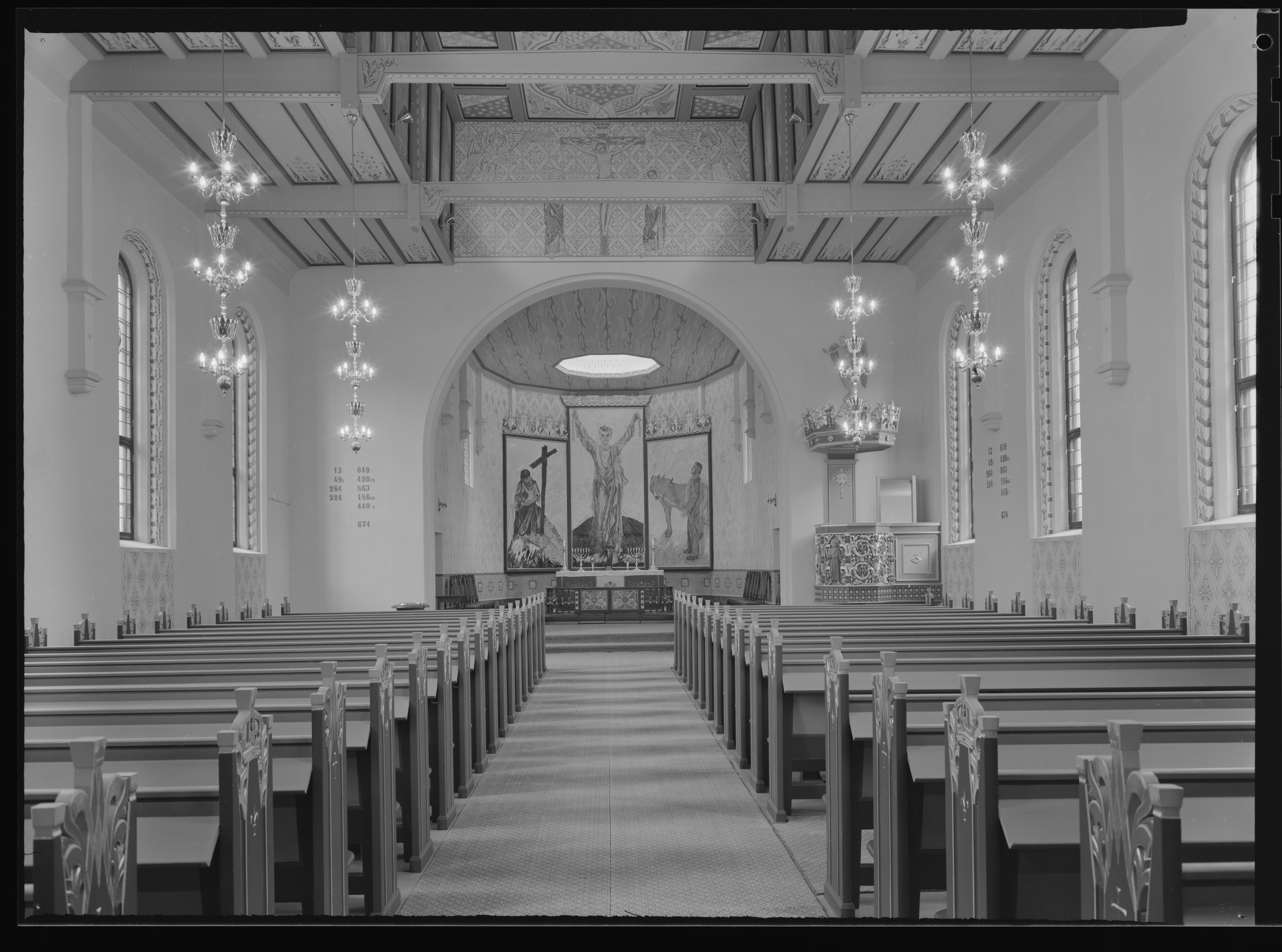

== See also ==
- List of cathedrals in Norway
- List of churches in Hamar
