= Hammar (surname) =

Hammar is a Swedish surname. Notable people with the surname include:

- Clarence Hammar (1899–1989), Swedish sailor
- Edith Hammar (born 1992), Swedish artist and illustrator
- Fredrik Hammar (born 2001), Swedish footballer
- Johan Hammar (born 1994), Swedish footballer
- Molly Hammar (born 1995), Swedish singer-songwriter
