= Kristian Vilhelm Koren Schjelderup Sr. =

Norwegian theologian and bishop

Right Reverend Kristian Schjelderup Sr.
- Bishop
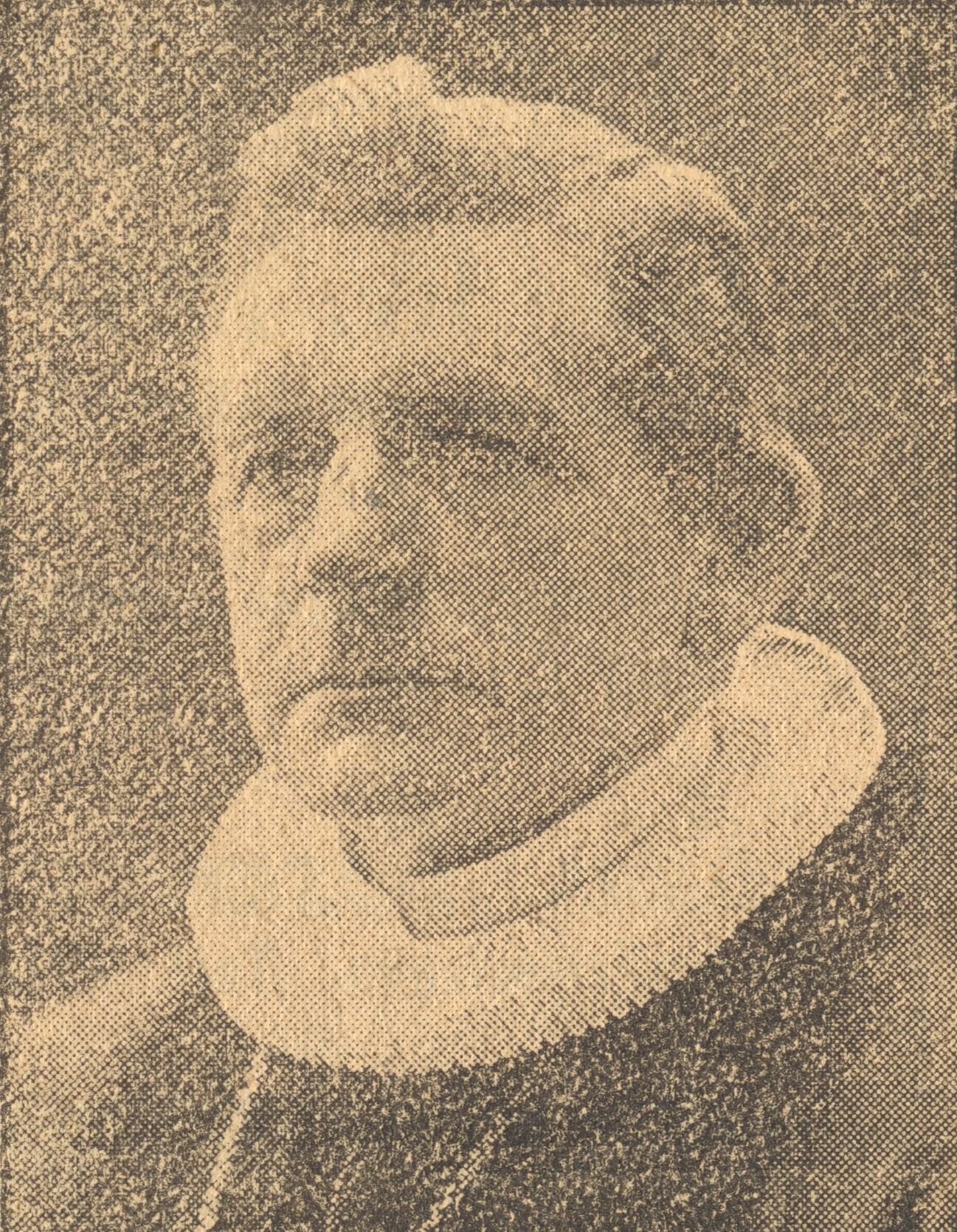
- Church: Church of Norway
- Diocese: Diocese of Kristiansand
- Appointed: 1908
- In office: 1908–1913
- Predecessor: Gunvald Thorkildsen
- Successor: Bernt Støylen

Personal details
- Born: 26 October 1853 Ullensaker, Norway
- Died: 23 October 1913 (aged 59) Sviland, Norway
- Buried: Vestre Gravlund, Oslo, Norway
- Denomination: Christian
- Parents: Peter Vilhelm Schjelderup and Dorothea Marie Lysholm
- Spouse: Henriette Nicoline Hassel
- Children: Kristian Vilhelm Koren Schjelderup Jr. and Harald Krabbe Schjelderup
- Occupation: Priest
- Education: Cand.theol. 1875

Kristian Vilhelm Koren Schjelderup (26 October 1853 – 23 October 1913) was a Norwegian theologian and a bishop in the Church of Norway.

== Personal life ==
Schjelderup was born in Ullensaker, Norway on 26 October 1853. He was the son of Peter Vilhelm Schjelderup and Dorothea Marie Lysholm. He had two brothers and one sister. He married Henriette Nicoline Hassel, with whom he had nine children. Their son Kristian Vilhelm Koren Schjelderup Jr. became a bishop as well, while their youngest son Harald Krabbe Schjelderup became a professor of psychology.

== Career ==
Schjelderup took his examen artium to finish his secondary education in 1870, and graduated with a cand.theol. degree in 1875. He worked as a chaplain in Moss from 1876 until 1880. He then moved to Christianssand to be a curate in the Christianssand Cathedral parish from 1880 until 1890. Following that, he then became vicar of the parish of Dybvaag Municipality in 1890. During this time, he also held the role of dean of the Østre Nedenes deanery from 1896 until 1903. After leaving Dybvaag, he served as parish priest for the parish of Oddernes Church, as well as supervising the whole Otredal deanery from 1903 until 1908. He was then appointed to be the bishop of the Diocese of Kristiansand, a position he held until his death on 23 October 1913. He died in the small village of Sviland in Sandnes Municipality after falling ill during the consecration of the newly built Sviland Chapel. He is buried in the family burial plot in the Vestre Gravlund cemetery in Oslo.

He was decorated as a Knight, First Class of the Order of St. Olav in 1910.

Religious titles
Preceded by Gunvald Thorkildsen	Bishop of Kristiansand; 1908–1913	Succeeded by Bernt Støylen
