= Arnoldus Hille =

Norwegian Lutheran Bishop

The Right Reverend Arnoldus Hille
- Bishop of Hamar
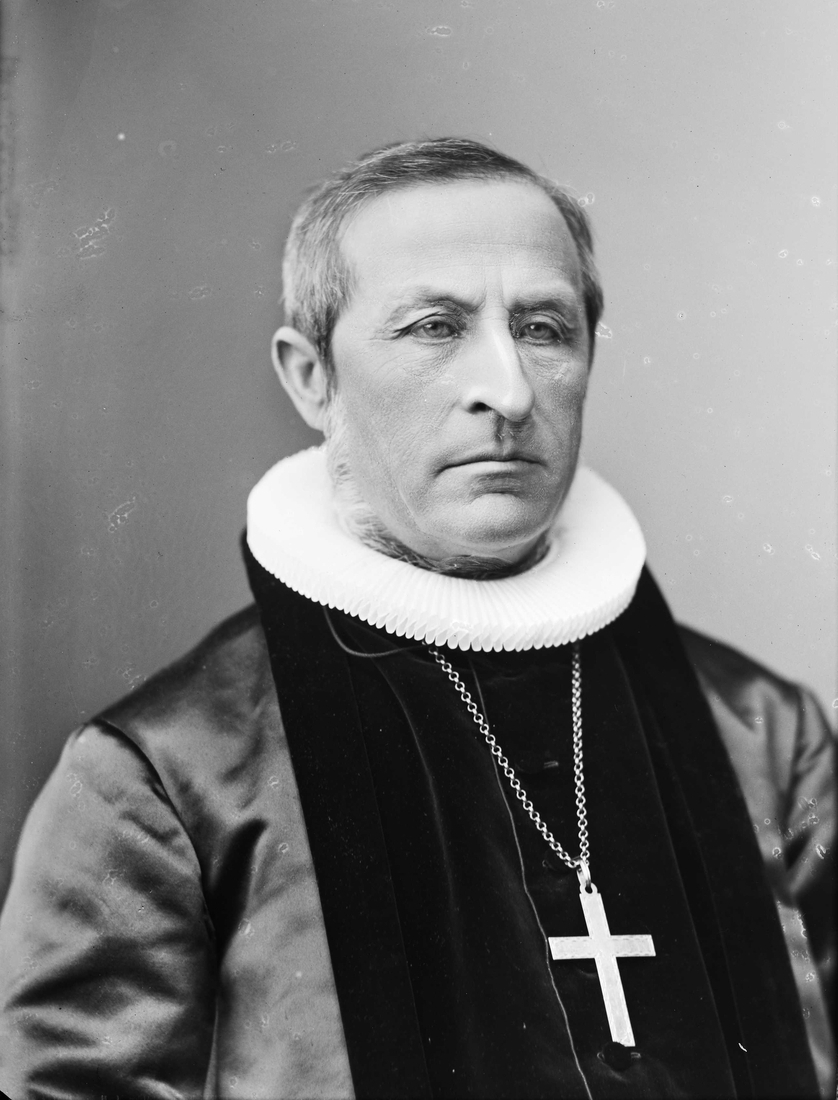
- Arnoldus Hille, ca. 1890–1900
- Church: Church of Norway
- Diocese: Hamar

Personal details
- Born: 14 March 1829 Leikanger, Norway
- Died: 7 January 1919 (aged 89)
- Denomination: Lutheran
- Children: Henrik Greve Hille
- Occupation: Priest

Arnoldus Marius Hille (14 March 1829 – 7 January 1919) was a Norwegian Lutheran Bishop.

== Biography ==
Hille was born in Leikanger, Nordre Bergenhus, Norway. He was the son of Wollert Krohn Hille (1796–1860) and Elisabeth Marie Hess Lem (1798–1888). In 1841, he enrolled at Bergen Cathedral School, and in 1848, he began studying theology.

In 1865, Hille became prison chaplain in Bergen and, in 1872, he was appointed assistant pastor in Stange Church in Hedmark county. He served as bishop in the Diocese of Hamar from 1887 to 1906. He was decorated Knight of the Order of St. Olav in 1882 and Commander, First Class in 1895.

== Personal life ==
He was married twice. His first marriage was in 1861 to Charlotte Sofie Sandberg (1832–1875), the daughter of Pastor Christian Juell Sandberg (1805–1843; see NBL1, Vol. 12) and Marie Catharine Rosenkilde (1802–1886). Following Charlotte’s death, he married her younger sister, Georgine Børrea Sandberg (1840–1927). His son, Henrik Greve Hille (1881–1946), served as Bishop of the Diocese of Hamar from 1934 to 1942, and his grandson, Georg Hille, held the same position from 1975 to 1993.

Religious titles
Preceded by Halvor Olsen Folkestad	Bishop of Hamar; 1887–1906	Succeeded by Christen Brun
