= Kristian Vilhelm Koren Schjelderup Jr. =

Norwegian Lutheran theologian, author and bishop

Kristian Vilhelm Koren Schjelderup (18 January 1894 – 28 March 1980) was a Norwegian Lutheran theologian, author, and bishop of the Diocese of Hamar in the Church of Norway from 1947 to 1964. He was noted as a warm-hearted and intellectual, liberal theologian.

== Personal life ==
He was born in Dybvaag Municipality as the son of bishop Kristian Vilhelm Koren Schjelderup and Henriette Nicoline Hassel. He had several brothers and sisters. His younger brother Harald Krabbe Schjelderup became a professor of psychology.

== Career ==
Kristian Schjelderup moved with his family to Kristiansand in 1903, where his father was appointed bishop in 1908. He graduated as Cand.theol. in 1918, and earned the Dr.theol. degree in 1923. He worked as a research fellow from 1921 to 1927; during this time, seeking to reconcile belief and knowledge in the modern world and inspired by Rudolf Otto, who he had come to know during a semester at the University of Marburg, he travelled to the Far East to study Hinduism and Buddhism. He also studied psychoanalysis with Oskar Pfister in Zürich and translated works by Sigmund Freud. In 1932 he and his brother Harald jointly published Über drei Haupttypen der religiösen Erlebnisformen und ihre psychologische Grundlage (On Three Major Types of the Form of the Religious Experience and their Psychological Bases). He published multiple articles, including a series on the historical origins of Christianity, later published in book form as Hvem Jesus var og hvad kirken har gjørt ham til (Who Jesus was and what the Church made of him) which criticised liberal theology for indecisiveness and aroused serious disagreements in the theology department of the university.

In 1928, Schjelderup applied for a position as vicar in the parish for Værøy Municipality and Røst Municipality, but although he was the only applicant, the Minister of Church Affairs, Sigvald Mathias Hasund, did not appoint him. However, a few years later he obtained a position at a research institute in Bergen, Christian Michelsens Institutt for Videnskap og Åndsfrihet. He was a pacifist from his youth onward.

Schjelderup founded the Landslaget for frilyndt kristendom (League for Free-Thinking Christianity), which was dissolved in 1933. In 1938, together with Anders Platou Wyller and Henriette Bie Lorentzen, he founded a humanistic academy, the Nansen Academy in Lillehammer; he headed it until it was closed down in 1940. (It reopened after the war and still exists.)

Through the Landslaget for frilyndt kristendom and its journal, Fritt ord (Free Word), Schjelderup came in contact with Jakob Wilhelm Hauer, founder of the German Faith Movement. Initially he regarded Hauer and his group as kindred spirits, which caused him to be criticised in 1935 as an "unwilling apostle of Fascism. But in a book published in 1935, På vei mot hedenskapet (On the Way to Paganism), he criticised the Nazi German politics of nationalism, militarism, racism and anti-Semitism which coloured the German Faith Movement, and in 1936, after a coup toppled Hauer from its leadership, he decided, and stated as much in a newspaper article, that the political wing had gained the upper hand and it had ceased to be a religious movement. From then on he gave his support only to the clergy resisting the Nazis.

Schjelderup was imprisoned in Grini concentration camp by the Nazi occupiers of Norway in 1942. Shortly after the war he was ordained, worked one year as a chaplain in Oslo, and was appointed by King Haakon VII of Norway and the Gerhardsen Cabinet as Bishop of Hamar in 1947.

In 1953–1954, he took part in the notorious public debate on the existence of Hell, where he strongly criticized a radio-transmitted speech by Professor of Theology Ole Hallesby, in which Hallesby had warned the population that they might go to Hell. Schjelderup was accused of deviating from the faith of the Church of Norway, but was acquitted by the Ministry of Church and Education.

Schjelderup ordained the first female priest in the Church of Norway, Ingrid Bjerkås, in 1961.

He retired as bishop in 1964. He was made a Commander of the Royal Norwegian Order of St. Olav in January the same year.

== Publications ==
- Religionens sandhet i lys av den relativitetsteoretiske virkelighetsopfatning (dissertation) (1921)
- Der mennesker blir guder. Fra mystikernes land i det fjerne Østen (1923)
- Hvem Jesus var og hvad kirken har gjort ham til(1924)
- Religion og religioner (1926)
- Ved døren. Meditasjoner (1929)
- Die Askese. Eine religionspsychologische Untersuchung (1928)
- Religiøse grunnformer i lys av psykologien (lecture) (1931)
- Uber drei Haupttypen der religiõsen Erlebnisformen und ihre psychologische Grundlage (1932) (with Harald Schjelderup)
- Toleransens og fordragelighetens problem – foredrag (1933)
- På vei mot hedenskapet. Trekk ved den tyske religionskamp (1935)
- Nansenskolen — Norsk humanistisk akademi (1937) (with Anders Wyller)
- Guds hus i fangeleiren (1945)
- Oppgjør med nazismens ideologi (lecture) (1945)
- Tiden kaller på kirken (1948)
- Den grunn hvorpå jeg bygger (1957)
- Veien jeg måtte gå (1963)
- Lys i mørket (1965)
- Under åpen himmel (1969)
- Jeg tror, Herre, hjelp min vantro (1973)

Cultural offices
Preceded by Einar Aasmund Olavson	Chairman of the Norwegian Students' Society; 1919 (spring)	Succeeded by Hans Bull Brodtkorb Mohr
Religious titles
Preceded by Henrik Hille	Bishop of Hamar; 1947–1964	Succeeded by Alexander Johnson
