= Romedal Municipality =

Former municipality in Hedmark, Norway

Romedal Municipality Romedal herred
- Former municipality
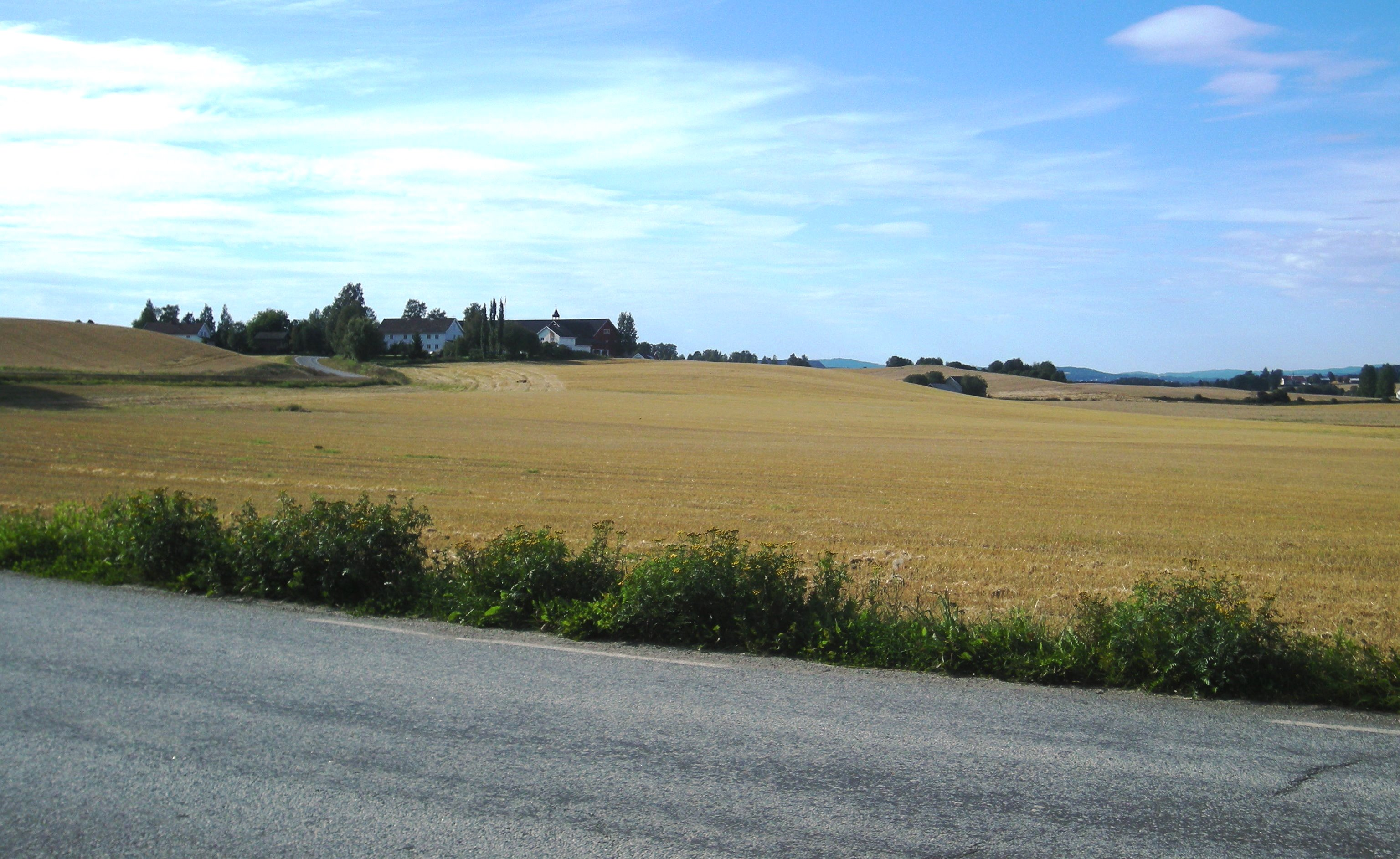
- View of the Romedal area

- Hedmark within Norway

- Romedal within Hedmark
- Coordinates: 60°44′14″N 11°17′29″E
- Country: Norway
- County: Hedmark
- District: Hedemarken
- Established: 1 Jan 1838
  - Created as: Formannskapsdistrikt
- Disestablished: 1 Jan 1964
  - Succeeded by: Stange Municipality
- Administrative centre: Romedal

Government
  - Mayor (1948-1964): Jens K. Nybruket (Ap)

Area (upon dissolution)
  - Total: 385.3 km^{2} (148.8 sq mi)
  - Rank: #236 in Norway
- Highest elevation: 642.63 m (2,108.4 ft)

Population (1963)
  - Total: 6,497
  - Rank: #125 in Norway
  - Density: 16.9/km^{2} (44/sq mi)
  - Change (10 years): ▼ −1%
- Demonym: Romedøl

Official language
  - Norwegian form: Neutral
- Time zone: UTC+01:00 (CET)
  - Summer (DST): UTC+02:00 (CEST)
- ISO 3166 code: NO-0416

Romedal is a former municipality in the old Hedmark county, Norway. The 385-square-kilometre (149 sq mi) municipality existed from 1838 until its dissolution in 1964. The area is now part of Stange Municipality in the traditional district of Hedmarken. The administrative centre was the village of Romedal where Romedal Church is located. Other villages in Romedal included Ilseng and Starhellinga. The municipality centered around the agriculture and forestry industries.

Prior to its dissolution in 1964, the 385.3-square-kilometre (148.8 sq mi) municipality was the 236th largest by area out of the 689 municipalities in Norway. Romedal Municipality was the 125th most populous municipality in Norway with a population of about 6,497. The municipality's population density was 16.9 inhabitants per square kilometre (44/sq mi) and its population had decreased by 1% over the previous 10-year period.

== General information ==
The parish of Romedal was established as a municipality on 1 January 1838 (see formannskapsdistrikt law). During the 1960s, there were many municipal mergers across Norway due to the work of the Schei Committee. On 1 January 1964, Romedal Municipality (population: 6,441) was merged with the neighboring Stange Municipality (population: 9,734) to form a new, larger Stange Municipality.

=== Name ===
The municipality (originally the parish) is named after the old Romedal farm (Old Norse: Ruðmudalr) since the first Romedal Church was built there. The first element is (probably) the genitive case of an old river name (Ruðma). The river name may have come from the word ryðja, which means 'clear' or 'empty'. The last element is dalr, which means 'valley' or 'dale'.

=== Churches ===
The Church of Norway had two parishes (sokn) within Romedal Municipality. At the time of the municipal dissolution, it was part of the Romedal prestegjeld and the Hamar domprosti (arch-deanery) in the Diocese of Hamar.

Churches in Romedal
Parish (sokn)	Church name	Location of the church	Year built
Romedal	Romedal Church	Romedal	1887
Vallset	Vallset Church	Vallset	1850

== Geography ==
The municipality was located in the Hedmarken district, just east of the large lake Mjøsa. Stange Municipality was to the west, Vang Municipality was to the north, Våler Municipality was to the northeast, Hof Municipality was to the southeast, and Nord-Odal Municipality was to the south. The highest point in the municipality was the 642.63-metre (2,108.4 ft) tall mountain Søndre Fjellsjøhøgda in the southeastern part of the municipality.

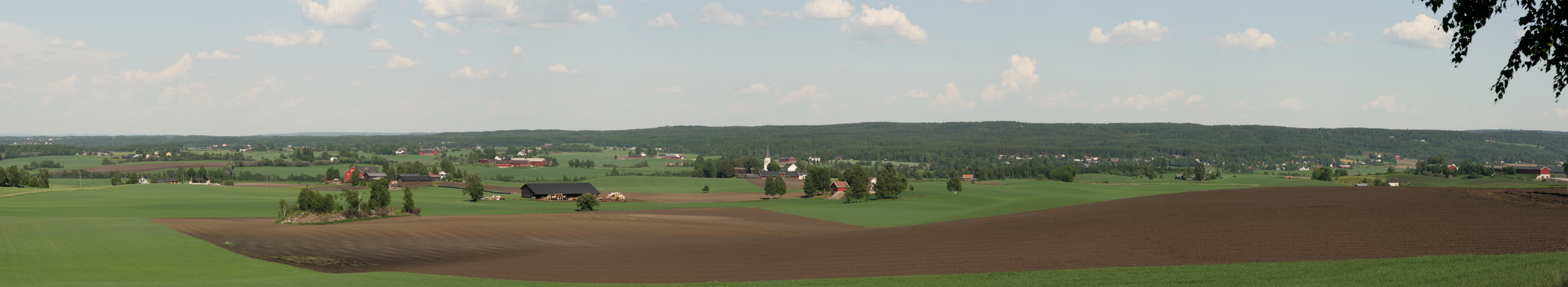
View of the Romedal area

== Government ==
While it existed, Romedal Municipality was responsible for primary education (through 10th grade), outpatient health services, senior citizen services, welfare and other social services, zoning, economic development, and municipal roads and utilities. The municipality was governed by a municipal council of directly elected representatives. The mayor was indirectly elected by a vote of the municipal council. The municipality was under the jurisdiction of the Eidsivating Court of Appeal.

=== Municipal council ===
The municipal council (Herredsstyre) of Romedal Municipality was made up of 25 representatives that were elected to four year terms. The tables below show the historical composition of the council by political party.

Romedal herredsstyre 1959–1963
Party name (in Norwegian)	Number of representatives
Labour Party (Arbeiderpartiet)	16
Conservative Party (Høyre)	2
Communist Party (Kommunistiske Parti)	2
Christian Democratic Party (Kristelig Folkeparti)	2
Centre Party (Senterpartiet)	3
Total number of members:	25
Note: On 1 January 1964, Romedal Municipality became part of Stange Municipality.

Romedal herredsstyre 1955–1959
Party name (in Norwegian)	Number of representatives
Labour Party (Arbeiderpartiet)	15
Communist Party (Kommunistiske Parti)	4
Christian Democratic Party (Kristelig Folkeparti)	2
Farmers' Party (Bondepartiet)	3
Joint List(s) of Non-Socialist Parties (Borgerlige Felleslister)	1
Total number of members:	25

Romedal herredsstyre 1951–1955
Party name (in Norwegian)	Number of representatives
Labour Party (Arbeiderpartiet)	12
Communist Party (Kommunistiske Parti)	3
Christian Democratic Party (Kristelig Folkeparti)	1
Farmers' Party (Bondepartiet)	2
Joint List(s) of Non-Socialist Parties (Borgerlige Felleslister)	2
Total number of members:	20

Romedal herredsstyre 1947–1951
Party name (in Norwegian)	Number of representatives
Labour Party (Arbeiderpartiet)	12
Communist Party (Kommunistiske Parti)	4
Christian Democratic Party (Kristelig Folkeparti)	1
Joint List(s) of Non-Socialist Parties (Borgerlige Felleslister)	3
Total number of members:	20

Romedal herredsstyre 1945–1947
Party name (in Norwegian)	Number of representatives
Labour Party (Arbeiderpartiet)	13
Communist Party (Kommunistiske Parti)	4
Joint List(s) of Non-Socialist Parties (Borgerlige Felleslister)	2
Local List(s) (Lokale lister)	1
Total number of members:	20

Romedal herredsstyre 1937–1941*
Party name (in Norwegian)	Number of representatives
Labour Party (Arbeiderpartiet)	15
Conservative Party (Høyre)	3
Farmers' Party (Bondepartiet)	2
Total number of members:	20
Note: Due to the German occupation of Norway during World War II, no elections were held for new municipal councils until after the war ended in 1945.

=== Mayors ===
The mayor (Norwegian: ordfører) of Romedal Municipality was the political leader of the municipality and the chairperson of the municipal council. The following people have held this position:

- 1838–1839: Nils Christoffersen Gaustad
- 1839–1842: H. Wegener
- 1842–1843: Christen Larsen Arneberg
- 1843–1844: Lars Christian Sandberg
- 1844–1845: Anton Hansen Horne
- 1845–1847: V.F. Krog
- 1847–1849: Christen Larsen Arneberg
- 1851–1853: Gulbrand Øvergaard
- 1854–1855: Anton Hansen Horne
- 1855–1859: S.H. Ræder
- 1859–1860: Kjel Sande
- 1861–1863: L.G. Bryhn
- 1863–1867: Jens Øvergård
- 1867–1871: Lars Arneberg
- 1871–1873: Hans Antonsen Horne
- 1873–1875: N. Hals
- 1875–1877: O.A. Bryhni
- 1877–1879: Lars Arneberg
- 1879–1882: L.G. Bryhn
- 1882–1883: O. Pedersen
- 1883–1891: Johan A. Horn
- 1891–1893: Lars Busvold
- 1893–1897: Kristian Horn
- 1897–1898: Olaf Bryhn
- 1899–1916: Anton Julius Tøsti
- 1917–1919: L. Julseth
- 1920–1922: O.J. Maagaard
- 1923–1928: L. Julseth
- 1929–1931: Alfred Johnsen (Ap)
- 1932–1941: Karl Petersen (Ap)
- 1941–1941: G. O. Bahus (Ap)
- 1941–1944: Arne Stramrud (NS)
- 1944–1945: Ole J. Lie (NS)
- 1945–1948: Karl Petersen (Ap)
- 1948–1964: Jens K. Nybruket (Ap)

== See also ==
- List of former municipalities of Norway
