= Sigurd Pedersen =

Norwegian politician (1893–1968)

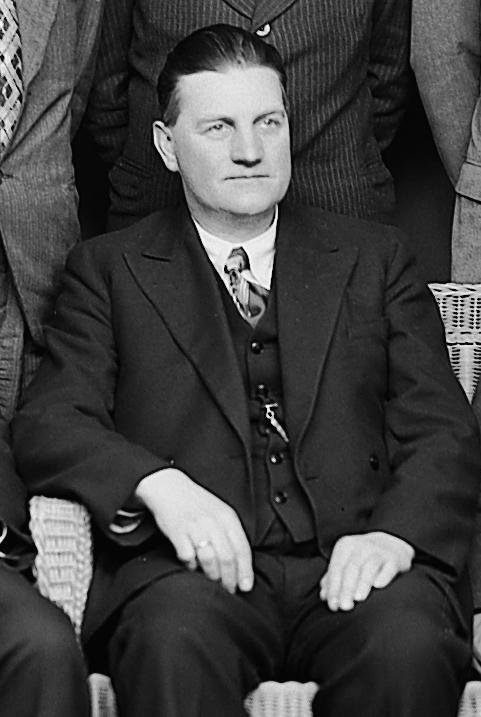
- Pedersen in 1930.

Member of the Storting
- In office 1950–1962
- Constituency: Hedmark and Oppland

Rådmann of Hamar Municipality
- In office 1935–1963

Mayor of Hamar Municipality
- In office 1933; 1934 – 1935

Member of the Municipal Council of Vang Municipality
- In office 1925–1925

Personal details
- Born: 26 January 1893 Espa, Sweden–Norway
- Died: 16 July 1968 (aged 75) Norway
- Party: Labour Party
- Occupation: Politician

Sigurd Pedersen (26 January 1893 – 16 July 1968) was a Norwegian politician for the Labour Party.

He was born in Espa in Stange Municipality.

He was elected to the Norwegian Parliament from the Market towns of Hedmark and Oppland counties in 1950, and was re-elected on two occasions. He had previously served in the position of deputy representative during the terms 1928–1930 and 1934–1936.

Pedersen was a member of the municipal council of Vang Municipality in 1925. He later held various positions on the municipal council of Hamar Municipality, serving as mayor there from 1933–1935. In 1935 he became burgomaster of Hamar, a position which was later renamed to rådmann, which he held to 1963.
