= Hjellum =

Village in Hamar Municipality, Norway

- Village
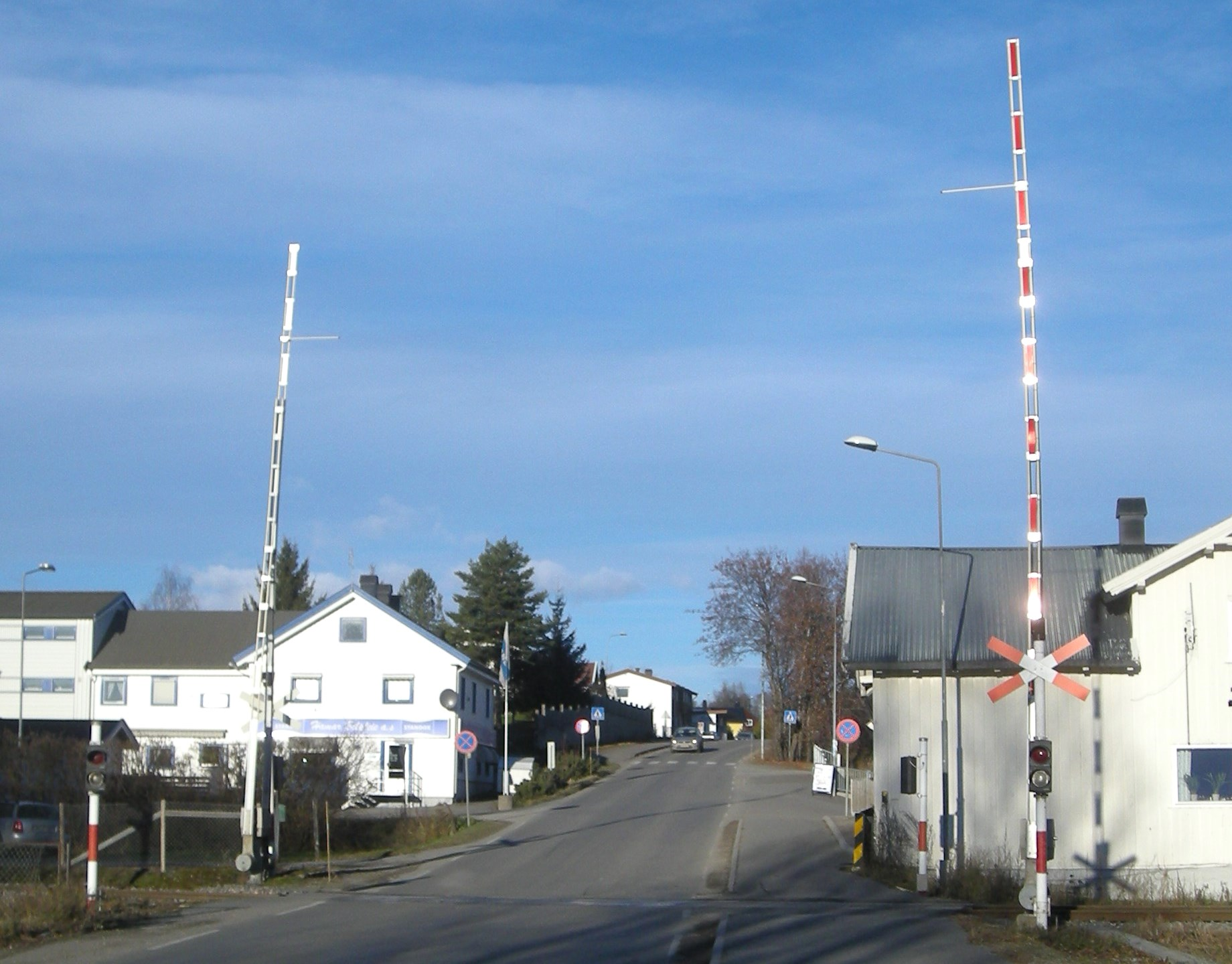
- View of the village
- Interactive map of Hjellum
- Location within Innlandet Location within Norway
- Coordinates: 60.79123°N 11.14935°E
- Country: Norway
- Region: Eastern Norway
- County: Innlandet
- District: Hedmarken
- Municipality: Hamar Municipality
- Elevation: 133 m (436 ft)
- Time zone: UTC+01:00 (CET)
  - Summer (DST): UTC+02:00 (CEST)
- Post Code: 2322 Ridabu

Hjellum is a village in Hamar Municipality in Innlandet county, Norway. The village is located on the north shore of the river Svartelva, about 2 kilometres (1.2 mi) southeast of the village of Ridabu.

Hjellum Station was a former station on the Rørosbanen railway. It has a small coking factory; the area around it has several coal mines.

== History ==
Prior to 1992, Hjellum was a part of Vang Municipality.
