= Ingebrigt =

Ingebrigt is a given name. Notable people with the name include:

- Ingebrigt Davik (1925–1991), Norwegian teacher, children's writer, broadcasting personality, singer and songwriter
- Ingebrigt Håker Flaten (born 1971), Norwegian bassist active in the jazz and free jazz genres
- Ingebrigt Haldorsen Sæter (1800–1875), Norwegian politician
- Ingebrigt Johansson (1904–1987), Norwegian mathematician
- Ingebrigt S. Sørfonn (born 1950), Norwegian politician representing the Christian People's Party
- Ingebrigt Steen Jensen (born 1955), Norwegian writer, consultant, advertising man and football enthusiast
- Ingebrigt Vik (1867–1927), Norwegian sculptor

== See also ==
- Ingeberg
- Ingeborg
