= Arne Juland =

Norwegian politician

Arne Johansen Juland

Member of the Norwegian Parliament
- In office 1918–1921
- Constituency: Søndre Hedemarken

Personal details
- Born: August 17, 1877 Juland, Lom Municipality, Norway
- Died: January 1957
- Party: Labour Party (until 1940s), Nasjonal Samling (during WWII)
- Occupation: Educator, politician
- Known for: School director in Diocese of Hamar; convicted of treason after WWII

Arne Johansen Juland (17 August 1877 – January 1957) was a Norwegian educator and politician for the Labour Party and later Nasjonal Samling.

He was born at Juland in Lom Municipality as a son of farmers Johan Johansen Juland (1847–1923) and Eldri Hansdotter (1836–1925). He graduated from Elverum Teachers' College in 1900, and worked in Lom for two years, Vågå Municipality for two years, Elverum Municipality for one year, Stange Municipality for two years, Lom Municipality again for one year, then Stange Municipality from 1908 to 1923 and Vang Municipality from 1923 to 1936. He was also a part-time teacher at Hamar Teachers' College from 1923 to 1936, and finally school director in the Diocese of Hamar from 1936 to 1 January 1944.

He was a member of the municipal council of Stange Municipality from 1910 to 1923, serving the last year as mayor. He was also municipal auditor for Stange from 1909 to 1918, and he was elected to the Parliament of Norway in 1918 from the constituency Søndre Hedemarken. He served one term as a member of the Standing Committee on Agriculture. He was later elected to serve as the mayor of Vang from 1928 to 1931.

He was also a member of Stange school board from 1917 to 1919, and Hedmark county school board from 1924 to 1936 (chair since 1930). He chaired the party chapters of Søndre Hedemarken from 1912 to 1920 and Vang from 1926 to 1928. From 1920 to 1923 he was a deputy board member of the Norwegian State Railways.

During the German occupation of Norway he joined the Fascist party Nasjonal Samling. In 1947, during the legal purge in Norway after World War II he was convicted of treason and received a minor sentence. In total there were fifteen former Labour Party mayors who were convicted of treason. He died in 1957.
