= Jørgen Otto Brockenhuus =

Danish-Norwegian military officer (1664–1728)

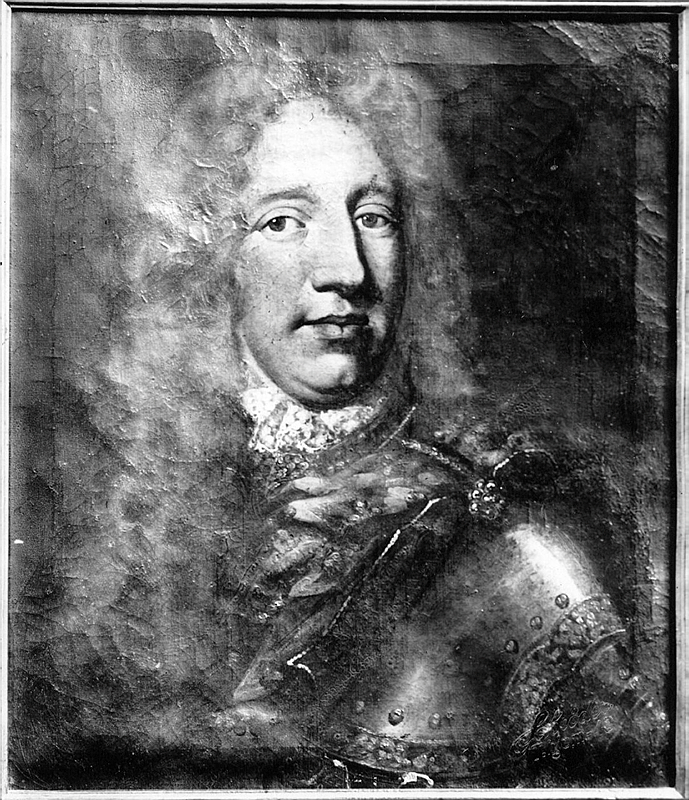
- Photograph of oil painting depicting officer Jørgen Otto Brockenhuus (1664–1728)
- Born: 1664
- Died: 1728 (aged 63–64)
- Military career
- Allegiance: Denmark-Norway
- Rank: colonel
- Commands: First Opland National Infantry Regiment

Jørgen Otto Brockenhuus (born 11 March 1664, in Storhammer in Hamar and died 1728 in Vang) was a Norwegian officer.

== Early life ==
He was son of colonel Ove Brockenhuus and Sophie Spang.

== Military career ==
In his youth he served as a second lieutenant (fenrik) in the Netherlands and served in the royal guard in Denmark but belonged to the Norwegian military. In 1710 he became colonel (oberst) and commander of the First Oppland National Infantry Regiment (1. oplandske nationale Regiment Fodfolk).

He took part in the warfare in Norway during the Great Northern War and was named the second in command under general Jens Maltesen Sehested in 1715, where he was commander of the forces in southern Norway (sønnenfjeldske Norge). In 1717 he again took charge of his own regiment, which he commanded until his death.

== Property ==
Brockenhuus owned the farms Åker (Åker gård) and Disen in Hedemark, and was married first to Blancheflor Sophie Due, and for a second time with Bertha Magdalene Brockenhuus, a daughter of his cousin. Brockenhuus founded the Brockenhuss –Schack family, resided there in the early 18th century.

== Personal life ==
Brockenhuus married twice, first to Blancheflor Sophie Jacobsdatter Due and second time to Bertha (Barte) Magdalene Brockenhuus (1684–1769). He was the father of Henrik Brockenhuus and Frederik Brockenhuus.
