= Espa (disambiguation) =

Espa is a village in Hedmark, Norway. It can also refer to the following:

- Esplanadi, colloquially called Espa, a park in Helsinki, Finland
- Etelä-Espoon Pallo, abbreviated EsPa, a sports club in Espoo, Finland
- EELV Secondary Payload Adapter, abbreviated ESPA, a transport facility for orbital carriers
- Luleå Airport, ICAO code ESPA
- Española, New Mexico
