= Skraastad =

Skraastad is a Norwegian surname. Notable people with the surname include:

- Johannes Skraastad (1648–1700), Norwegian artist
- Kristoffer Skraastad (1865–1948), Norwegian farmer and politician
