= Hamar Municipality =

Municipality in Innlandet, Norway

Hamar Municipality Hamar kommune
- Municipality
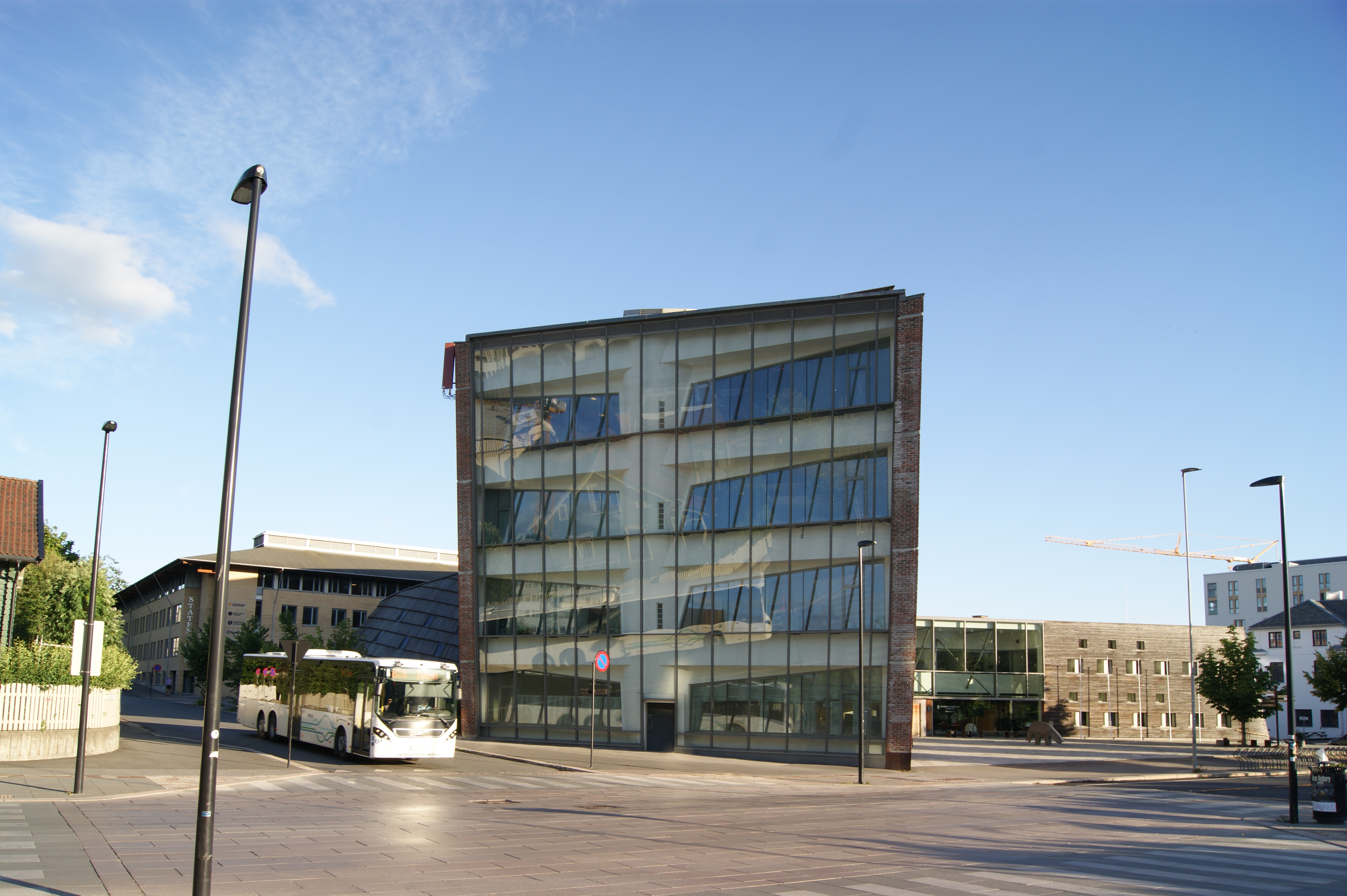
- Hamar town hall

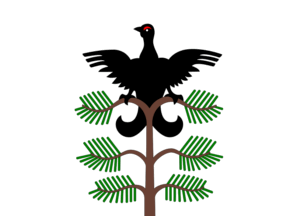
- Flag Coat of arms

- Innlandet within Norway

- Hamar within Innlandet
- Coordinates: 60°47′57″N 11°3′22″E
- Country: Norway
- County: Innlandet
- District: Hedmarken
- Established: 12 March 1849
  - Preceded by: Vang Municipality
- Administrative centre: Hamar

Government
  - Mayor (2023): Vigdis Stensby (LL)

Area
  - Total: 350.93 km^{2} (135.49 sq mi)
  - Land: 337.64 km^{2} (130.36 sq mi)
  - Water: 13.29 km^{2} (5.13 sq mi) 3.8%
  - Rank: #250 in Norway
- Highest elevation: 931.67 m (3,056.7 ft)

Population (2025)
  - Total: 33,441
  - Rank: #31 in Norway
  - Density: 95.3/km^{2} (247/sq mi)
  - Change (10 years): ▲ +11.4%
- Demonym(s): Hamarensar; Hamarenser; Hamarsing

Official language
  - Norwegian form: Neutral
- Time zone: UTC+01:00 (CET)
  - Summer (DST): UTC+02:00 (CEST)
- ISO 3166 code: NO-3403
- Website: Official website

Hamar Municipality (Norwegian: Hamar kommune; [ˈhɑ̂ːmɑr]) is a municipality in Innlandet county, Norway. It is located in the traditional district of Hedmarken. The administrative centre of the municipality is the town of Hamar. Other settlements in Hamar include Hjellum, Slemsrud, Ridabu, Ingeberg, and Ilseng.

The 351-square-kilometre (136 sq mi) municipality is the 250th largest by area out of the 357 municipalities in Norway. Hamar Municipality is the 31st most populous municipality in Norway with a population of 33,441. The municipality's population density is 95.3 inhabitants per square kilometre (247/sq mi) and its population has increased by 11.4% over the previous 10-year period.

Among the municipality's responsibilities of local government, it also runs nine primary and three lower secondary schools, with a combined 3,115 pupils. The municipality also owns the power company Hamar Energi, and the sports venues Briskeby Arena, Vikingskipet, and Hamar Olympic Amphitheatre.

== General information ==
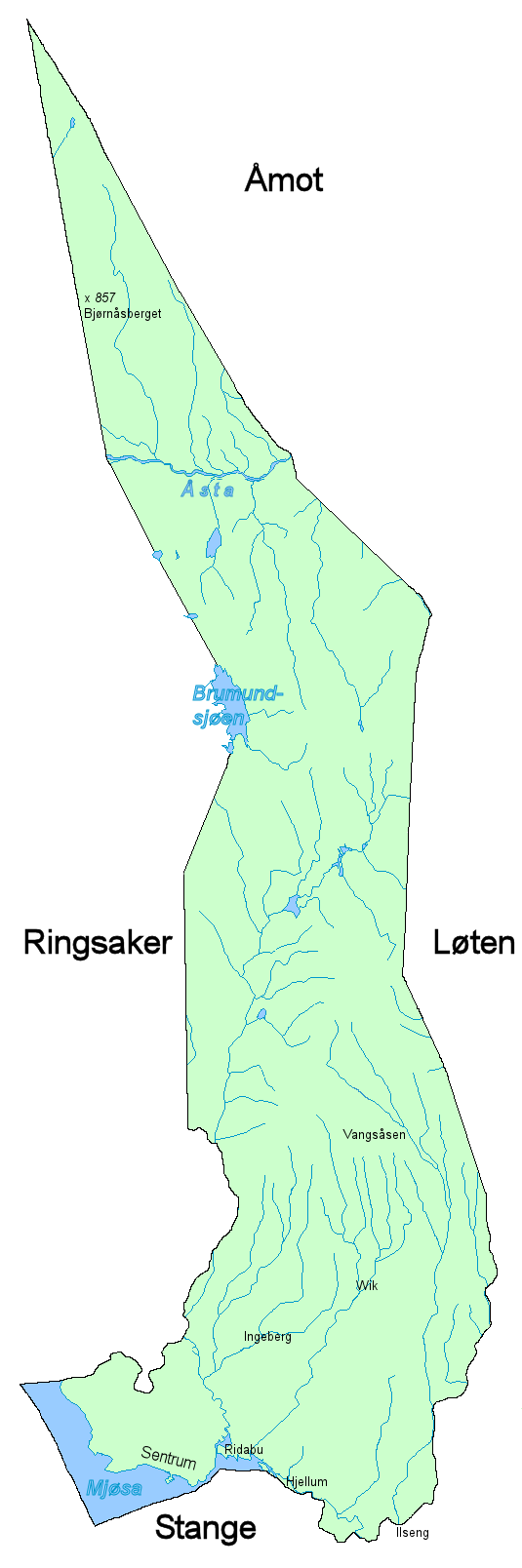
Map of the municipality

In 1848, the village of Hamar was granted kjøpstad status for a land area of about 400 decares (99 acres). This newly designated "town" (population: 1,025) was separated from Vang Municipality and Hamar was established as a separate municipality in 1849. On 1 January 1878, Hamar Municipality was enlarged by annexing about 800 decares (200 acres) of land and 138 people from Vang Municipality to Hamar Municipality. In 1946, a large area in Vang Municipality that surrounded the town of Hamar (population: 4,087) was transferred out of Vang Municipality and into Hamar Municipality. The next year in 1947, part of the neighboring Furnes Municipality (population: 821) was transferred into Hamar Municipality. On 1 January 1965, a part of Ringsaker Municipality (population: 100) was transferred into Hamar Municipality.

On 1 January 1992, Vang Municipality (population: 9,103) was merged with Hamar Municipality (population: 16,351) and parts of the Stensby, Hanstad, Viker, and Stammerud areas of Ringsaker Municipality (population: 224) to form a new, larger Hamar Municipality.

Historically, the municipality was part of the old Hedmark county. On 1 January 2020, the municipality became a part of the newly-formed Innlandet county (after Hedmark and Oppland counties were merged).

=== Name ===
The municipality (originally the town) is named after the old Hamar farm (Old Norse: Hamarr). The medieval market was first built on this farm and that market eventually became a kjøpstad, the town of Hamar. This town later became a self-governing municipality. The name is identical with the word hamarr which means "stone" or "rocky hill".

=== Coat of arms ===
The coat of arms was first granted on 2 June 1896 and re-granted on 9 July 1993. The official blazon is "Argent, a grouse sable displayed standing on a pine tree issuant from the base" (Norwegian: I sølv, en svart orrfugl med flakte vinger i toppen av et grønt furutre med naturfarget stamme). This means the arms have a field (background) has a tincture of argent which means it is commonly colored white, but if it is made out of metal, then silver is used. The charge is a black grouse sitting at the top of a pine tree. An older version of the arms had been used for a long time. The old version was first described in the anonymous Hamar Chronicle, written in 1553. Since then, it has been generally kept the same, although it has had some minor revisions over the years. The arms were designed by Andreas Bloch (1896 version) and by Per Solheim (1963 version) and Arvid Steen (1993 version). The municipal flag has the same design as the coat of arms.

=== Churches ===
The Church of Norway has two parishes (sokn) within Hamar Municipality. It is part of the Hamar domprosti (arch-deanery) in the Diocese of Hamar.

Churches in Hamar Municipality
Parish (sokn)	Church name	Location of the church	Year built
Hamar	Hamar Cathedral	Hamar	1866
Hamar	Storhamar Church	Hamar	1975
Vang	Vang Church	Ridabu	1810
Vang	Øvre Vang Church	Slemsrud	1907

== Geography ==
The municipality of Hamar lies along the eastern shore of the large lake Mjøsa. The rivers Flakstadelva, Lageråa, and Svartelva run through the municipality. The municipality lies to the east of Ringsaker Municipality, to the south of Åmot Municipality, to the west of Løten Municipality, and to the north of Stange Municipality. The highest point in the municipality was the 931.67-metre (3,056.7 ft) point on the side of Kroksjøhøgda (the mountain itself is located in neighboring Ringsaker Municipality, and this point on the side of the mountain lies along the municipal border).

=== Climate ===
Hamar has a humid continental climate (Dfb) with fairly dry and cold winters, and comfortably warm summers. The Hamar II weather station, at an elevation of 141 metres (463 ft), started recording in 1968. The all-time high 33 °C (91 °F) was recorded in July 2018, which was the warmest month on record with average daily high 28.8 °C (83.8 °F) and mean 21.6 °C (70.9 °F). The all-time low −29.8 °C (−21.6 °F) is from in December 2010, which was a very cold month with mean −14 °C (7 °F) and average daily low −18.2 °C (−0.8 °F). A previous weather station (Hamar I, at an elevation of 139 m) recorded the coldest month on record with mean −17.2 °C (1.0 °F) in January 1917. In August 1975, the weather station "Staur Forsøksgård" in nearby Stange recorded 35 °C (95 °F).

Climate data for Hamar 1991-2020 (141 m, extremes 2008-present, precipitation days 1961-90)
Month	Jan	Feb	Mar	Apr	May	Jun	Jul	Aug	Sep	Oct	Nov	Dec	Year
Record high °C (°F)	10.7 (51.3)	10.0 (50.0)	19.1 (66.4)	24.4 (75.9)	30.0 (86.0)	32.0 (89.6)	33.0 (91.4)	29.2 (84.6)	25.3 (77.5)	19.2 (66.6)	16.3 (61.3)	10.9 (51.6)	33.0 (91.4)
Mean daily maximum °C (°F)	−3 (27)	−1 (30)	3 (37)	8 (46)	15 (59)	19 (66)	21 (70)	19 (66)	14 (57)	8 (46)	1 (34)	−4 (25)	8 (47)
Daily mean °C (°F)	−5.7 (21.7)	−5.3 (22.5)	−1.1 (30.0)	4.4 (39.9)	10.3 (50.5)	14.6 (58.3)	17.0 (62.6)	15.5 (59.9)	10.9 (51.6)	5.0 (41.0)	0.1 (32.2)	−4.5 (23.9)	5.1 (41.2)
Mean daily minimum °C (°F)	−9 (16)	−9 (16)	−6 (21)	0 (32)	5 (41)	12 (54)	13 (55)	11 (52)	8 (46)	3 (37)	−1 (30)	−6 (21)	2 (35)
Record low °C (°F)	−29.0 (−20.2)	−29.5 (−21.1)	−22.4 (−8.3)	−15.4 (4.3)	−4.3 (24.3)	1.1 (34.0)	4.4 (39.9)	3 (37)	−2.9 (26.8)	−12.5 (9.5)	−20.7 (−5.3)	−29.8 (−21.6)	−29.8 (−21.6)
Average precipitation mm (inches)	21.6 (0.85)	15 (0.6)	15.5 (0.61)	27.6 (1.09)	55.6 (2.19)	55 (2.2)	67.8 (2.67)	71.7 (2.82)	55.5 (2.19)	48.6 (1.91)	40.7 (1.60)	25.5 (1.00)	500.1 (19.73)
Average precipitation days (≥ 1.0 mm)	8	6	7	6	8	10	10	10	10	9	9	8	101
Source 1: eklima.no (mean, precipitaiton, extremes)
Source 2: weatherspark.com (avg high/low temperatures)

== Government ==
Hamar Municipality is responsible for primary education (through 10th grade), outpatient health services, senior citizen services, welfare and other social services, zoning, economic development, and municipal roads and utilities. The municipality is governed by a municipal council of directly elected representatives. The mayor is indirectly elected by a vote of the municipal council. The municipality is under the jurisdiction of the Hedmarken og Østerdal District Court and the Eidsivating Court of Appeal.

=== Municipal council ===
The municipal council (Kommunestyre) of Hamar Municipality is made up of 39 representatives that are elected to four year terms. The tables below show the current and historical composition of the council by political party.

Hamar kommunestyre 2023–2027
Party name (in Norwegian)	Number of representatives
Labour Party (Arbeiderpartiet)	6
Progress Party (Fremskrittspartiet)	2
Green Party (Miljøpartiet De Grønne)	1
Conservative Party (Høyre)	6
Christian Democratic Party (Kristelig Folkeparti)	1
Pensioners' Party (Pensjonistpartiet)	2
Red Party (Rødt)	2
Centre Party (Senterpartiet)	1
Socialist Left Party (Sosialistisk Venstreparti)	3
Liberal Party (Venstre)	3
Town and local list (By- og bygdelista)	12
Total number of members:	39

Hamar kommunestyre 2019–2023
Party name (in Norwegian)	Number of representatives
Labour Party (Arbeiderpartiet)	9
Progress Party (Fremskrittspartiet)	1
Green Party (Miljøpartiet De Grønne)	2
Conservative Party (Høyre)	4
Christian Democratic Party (Kristelig Folkeparti)	1
Pensioners' Party (Pensjonistpartiet)	1
Red Party (Rødt)	1
Centre Party (Senterpartiet)	3
Socialist Left Party (Sosialistisk Venstreparti)	2
Liberal Party (Venstre)	1
Town and local list (By- og bygdelista)	14
Total number of members:	39

Hamar kommunestyre 2015–2019
Party name (in Norwegian)	Number of representatives
Labour Party (Arbeiderpartiet)	14
Progress Party (Fremskrittspartiet)	1
Green Party (Miljøpartiet De Grønne)	2
Conservative Party (Høyre)	5
Christian Democratic Party (Kristelig Folkeparti)	1
Pensioners' Party (Pensjonistpartiet)	1
Centre Party (Senterpartiet)	1
Socialist Left Party (Sosialistisk Venstreparti)	1
Liberal Party (Venstre)	2
Town and local list (By- og bygdelista)	11
Total number of members:	39

Hamar kommunestyre 2011–2015
Party name (in Norwegian)	Number of representatives
Labour Party (Arbeiderpartiet)	15
Progress Party (Fremskrittspartiet)	2
Conservative Party (Høyre)	7
Christian Democratic Party (Kristelig Folkeparti)	2
Pensioners' Party (Pensjonistpartiet)	2
Centre Party (Senterpartiet)	1
Socialist Left Party (Sosialistisk Venstreparti)	1
Liberal Party (Venstre)	2
Town and local list (By- og bygdelista)	7
Total number of members:	39

Hamar kommunestyre 2007–2011
Party name (in Norwegian)	Number of representatives
Labour Party (Arbeiderpartiet)	10
Progress Party (Fremskrittspartiet)	3
Conservative Party (Høyre)	3
Christian Democratic Party (Kristelig Folkeparti)	2
Pensioners' Party (Pensjonistpartiet)	1
Socialist Left Party (Sosialistisk Venstreparti)	2
Liberal Party (Venstre)	2
Town and local list (By- og bygdelista)	16
Total number of members:	39

Hamar kommunestyre 2003–2007
Party name (in Norwegian)	Number of representatives
Labour Party (Arbeiderpartiet)	13
Progress Party (Fremskrittspartiet)	3
Conservative Party (Høyre)	3
Christian Democratic Party (Kristelig Folkeparti)	1
Pensioners' Party (Pensjonistpartiet)	3
Centre Party (Senterpartiet)	1
Socialist Left Party (Sosialistisk Venstreparti)	4
Town and local list (By- og bygdelista)	11
Total number of members:	39

Hamar kommunestyre 1999–2003
Party name (in Norwegian)	Number of representatives
Labour Party (Arbeiderpartiet)	16
Progress Party (Fremskrittspartiet)	2
Conservative Party (Høyre)	6
Christian Democratic Party (Kristelig Folkeparti)	2
Socialist Left Party (Sosialistisk Venstreparti)	3
Town and local list (By- og bygdelista)	10
Total number of members:	39

Hamar kommunestyre 1995–1999
Party name (in Norwegian)	Number of representatives
Labour Party (Arbeiderpartiet)	22
Progress Party (Fremskrittspartiet)	3
Conservative Party (Høyre)	6
Christian Democratic Party (Kristelig Folkeparti)	2
Centre Party (Senterpartiet)	2
Socialist Left Party (Sosialistisk Venstreparti)	3
Liberal Party (Venstre)	1
Town and local list (By- og bygdelista)	10
Total number of members:	49

Hamar kommunestyre 1991–1995
Party name (in Norwegian)	Number of representatives
Labour Party (Arbeiderpartiet)	21
Progress Party (Fremskrittspartiet)	1
Conservative Party (Høyre)	7
Christian Democratic Party (Kristelig Folkeparti)	2
Centre Party (Senterpartiet)	3
Socialist Left Party (Sosialistisk Venstreparti)	8
Liberal Party (Venstre)	1
Town and local list (By- og bygdelista)	6
Total number of members:	49
Note: On 1 January 1992, Vang Municipality and parts of Ringsaker Municipality were incorporated into Hamar Municipality.

Hamar bystyre 1987–1991
Party name (in Norwegian)	Number of representatives
Labour Party (Arbeiderpartiet)	27
Progress Party (Fremskrittspartiet)	4
Conservative Party (Høyre)	12
Christian Democratic Party (Kristelig Folkeparti)	2
Red Electoral Alliance (Rød Valgallianse)	1
Centre Party (Senterpartiet)	1
Socialist Left Party (Sosialistisk Venstreparti)	4
Liberal Party (Venstre)	2
Total number of members:	53

Hamar bystyre 1983–1987
Party name (in Norwegian)	Number of representatives
Labour Party (Arbeiderpartiet)	29
Progress Party (Fremskrittspartiet)	2
Conservative Party (Høyre)	13
Christian Democratic Party (Kristelig Folkeparti)	2
Centre Party (Senterpartiet)	1
Socialist Left Party (Sosialistisk Venstreparti)	3
Liberal Party (Venstre)	3
Total number of members:	53

Hamar bystyre 1979–1983
Party name (in Norwegian)	Number of representatives
Labour Party (Arbeiderpartiet)	27
Conservative Party (Høyre)	16
Christian Democratic Party (Kristelig Folkeparti)	3
Centre Party (Senterpartiet)	1
Socialist Left Party (Sosialistisk Venstreparti)	2
Liberal Party (Venstre)	4
Total number of members:	53

Hamar bystyre 1975–1979
Party name (in Norwegian)	Number of representatives
Labour Party (Arbeiderpartiet)	29
Conservative Party (Høyre)	12
Christian Democratic Party (Kristelig Folkeparti)	4
New People's Party (Nye Folkepartiet)	1
Centre Party (Senterpartiet)	2
Socialist Left Party (Sosialistisk Venstreparti)	3
Liberal Party (Venstre)	2
Total number of members:	53

Hamar bystyre 1971–1975
Party name (in Norwegian)	Number of representatives
Labour Party (Arbeiderpartiet)	30
Conservative Party (Høyre)	12
Christian Democratic Party (Kristelig Folkeparti)	3
Centre Party (Senterpartiet)	2
Socialist People's Party (Sosialistisk Folkeparti)	3
Liberal Party (Venstre)	3
Total number of members:	53

Hamar bystyre 1967–1971
Party name (in Norwegian)	Number of representatives
Labour Party (Arbeiderpartiet)	30
Conservative Party (Høyre)	13
Christian Democratic Party (Kristelig Folkeparti)	2
Centre Party (Senterpartiet)	1
Socialist People's Party (Sosialistisk Folkeparti)	3
Liberal Party (Venstre)	4
Total number of members:	53

Hamar bystyre 1963–1967
Party name (in Norwegian)	Number of representatives
Labour Party (Arbeiderpartiet)	32
Conservative Party (Høyre)	14
Communist Party (Kommunistiske Parti)	1
Christian Democratic Party (Kristelig Folkeparti)	2
Socialist People's Party (Sosialistisk Folkeparti)	1
Liberal Party (Venstre)	3
Total number of members:	53

Hamar bystyre 1959–1963
Party name (in Norwegian)	Number of representatives
Labour Party (Arbeiderpartiet)	32
Conservative Party (Høyre)	13
Communist Party (Kommunistiske Parti)	2
Christian Democratic Party (Kristelig Folkeparti)	3
Liberal Party (Venstre)	3
Total number of members:	53

Hamar bystyre 1955–1959
Party name (in Norwegian)	Number of representatives
Labour Party (Arbeiderpartiet)	32
Conservative Party (Høyre)	11
Communist Party (Kommunistiske Parti)	5
Christian Democratic Party (Kristelig Folkeparti)	3
Liberal Party (Venstre)	4
Total number of members:	53

Hamar bystyre 1951–1955
Party name (in Norwegian)	Number of representatives
Labour Party (Arbeiderpartiet)	29
Conservative Party (Høyre)	11
Communist Party (Kommunistiske Parti)	4
Christian Democratic Party (Kristelig Folkeparti)	4
Liberal Party (Venstre)	4
Total number of members:	52

Hamar bystyre 1947–1951
Party name (in Norwegian)	Number of representatives
Labour Party (Arbeiderpartiet)	26
Conservative Party (Høyre)	11
Communist Party (Kommunistiske Parti)	7
Christian Democratic Party (Kristelig Folkeparti)	4
Liberal Party (Venstre)	4
Total number of members:	52

Hamar bystyre 1946–1947
Party name (in Norwegian)	Number of representatives
Labour Party (Arbeiderpartiet)	23
Conservative Party (Høyre)	10
Communist Party (Kommunistiske Parti)	11
Christian Democratic Party (Kristelig Folkeparti)	6
Liberal Party (Venstre)	2
Total number of members:	52
Note: In 1946, the town of Hamar was greatly enlarged by annexing lands from Vang. A new election was held for the newly enlarge town to finish out the original term.

Hamar bystyre 1945–1945
Party name (in Norwegian)	Number of representatives
Labour Party (Arbeiderpartiet)	17
Conservative Party (Høyre)	7
Communist Party (Kommunistiske Parti)	5
Christian Democratic Party (Kristelig Folkeparti)	6
Liberal Party (Venstre)	1
Total number of members:	36
Note: In 1946, the town of Hamar was greatly enlarged by annexing lands from Vang. A new election was held for the newly enlarge town to finish out the original term.

Hamar bystyre 1937–1940*
Party name (in Norwegian)	Number of representatives
Labour Party (Arbeiderpartiet)	18
Conservative Party (Høyre)	12
Communist Party (Kommunistiske Parti)	1
Nasjonal Samling Party (Nasjonal Samling)	1
Liberal Party (Venstre)	4
Total number of members:	36
Note: Due to the German occupation of Norway during World War II, no elections were held for new municipal councils until after the war ended in 1945.

Hamar bystyre 1934–1937
Party name (in Norwegian)	Number of representatives
Labour Party (Arbeiderpartiet)	18
Communist Party (Kommunistiske Parti)	1
Nasjonal Samling Party (Nasjonal Samling)	2
Liberal Party (Venstre)	3
Joint list of the Conservative Party (Høyre) and the Free-minded People's Party (Frisinnede Folkeparti)	12
Total number of members:	36

Hamar bystyre 1931–1934
Party name (in Norwegian)	Number of representatives
Labour Party (Arbeiderpartiet)	18
Free-minded People's Party (Frisinnede Folkeparti)	4
Conservative Party (Høyre)	11
Liberal Party (Venstre)	3
Total number of members:	36

Hamar bystyre 1928–1931
Party name (in Norwegian)	Number of representatives
Labour Party (Arbeiderpartiet)	17
Free-minded Liberal Party (Frisinnede Venstre)	5
Conservative Party (Høyre)	10
Communist Party (Kommunistiske Parti)	1
Liberal Party (Venstre)	3
Total number of members:	36

Hamar bystyre 1925–1928
Party name (in Norwegian)	Number of representatives
Labour Party (Arbeiderpartiet)	8
Communist Party (Kommunistiske Parti)	8
Joint list of the Conservative Party (Høyre) and the Free-minded Liberal Party (Frisinnede Venstre)	17
Homeowner's Common List (Huseiers fellesliste)	3
Total number of members:	36

Hamar bystyre 1922–1925
Party name (in Norwegian)	Number of representatives
Labour Party (Arbeiderpartiet)	17
Joint list of the Conservative Party (Høyre) and the Free-minded Liberal Party (Frisinnede Venstre)	16
Joint list of the Liberal Party (Venstre) and the Labour Democrats (Arbeiderdemokratene)	3
Total number of members:	36

Hamar bystyre 1919–1922
Party name (in Norwegian)	Number of representatives
Labour Party (Arbeiderpartiet)	13
Temperance Party (Avholdspartiet)	3
Joint List(s) of Non-Socialist Parties (Borgerlige Felleslister)	20
Total number of members:	36

=== Mayors ===
The mayor (Norwegian: ordfører) of Hamar Municipality is the political leader of the municipality and the chairperson of the municipal council. Here is a list of people who have held this position:

- 1849–1851: Henrik Christian Borchgrevink
- 1852–1853: P.J. Major
- 1854–1854: Hans Arveschoug Samuelsen
- 1855–1855: Bernt Magnus Kinck
- 1856–1856: Hans Arveschoug Samuelsen
- 1857–1857: Bernt Magnus Kinck
- 1858–1858: Peter Nicolai Zernichow Arentz
- 1859–1859: Holger Bierch Matheson
- 1860–1860: Hans Arveschoug Samuelsen
- 1861–1861: Peter Nicolai Zernichow Arentz
- 1862–1862: Hans Arveschoug Samuelsen
- 1863–1863: Christian Fredrik Stoud Platou
- 1864–1864: Hans Arveschoug Samuelsen
- 1865–1866: Rudolph Falck
- 1867–1867: Hans Arveschoug Samuelsen
- 1868–1868: Bernt Magnus Kinck
- 1868–1869: Andreas Steen
- 1870–1870: Johannes Olsen
- 1871–1873: Andreas Steen
- 1874–1874: Johannes Olsen
- 1875–1875: Martinus Schjerden
- 1876–1876: Bernt Magnus Kinck
- 1877–1877: Martinus Schjerden
- 1878–1878: Oluf Saxe
- 1878–1881: Andreas Steen
- 1882–1882: Martinus Schjerden
- 1883–1885: Jens Jenssen
- 1885–1885: Bernt Magnus Kinck
- 1886–1901: Carl Willoch Ludvig Horn
- 1902–1907: Gabriel Andreas Stoud Platou
- 1908–1910: Gustav Heiberg (V)
- 1911–1913: Just Johan Bing Broch (V)
- 1913–1913: Engebret H. Brændholen (Ap)
- 1914–1916: Gustav Heiberg (V)
- 1917–1919: Fredrik Monsen (Ap)
- 1919–1920: Ole Anderssen (V)
- 1920–1926: Carl Holst Larsen (H)
- 1927–1931: Nicolai Helland (Ap)
- 1932–1932: Johannes Bergh (H)
- 1933–1933: Sigurd Pedersen (Ap)
- 1934–1934: Johannes Bergh (H)
- 1935–1935: Sigurd Pedersen (Ap)
- 1935–1946: Kristian Bakken (Ap)
- 1941–1945: Einar Grill Fasting (NS)
- 1946–1967: Erling Audensen (Ap)
- 1968–1975: Kristian Birger Gundersen (Ap)
- 1975–1991: Egil Oddvar Larsen (Ap)
- 1992–1999: Odd Aspeli (Ap)
- 1999–2011: Einar Busterud (LL)
- 2011–2015: Morten Aspeli (Ap)
- 2015–2023: Einar Busterud (LL)
- 2023–present: Vigdis Stensby (LL)

== Transportation ==
The town of Hamar is an important railway junction between two different railway lines going to Trondheim. The Rørosbanen railway line (the older line) leaves Hamar and heads northeast towards Røros. The main Dovrebanen railway line also heads north, but further west of the other line. Both lines stop at Hamar Station. The Norwegian Railway Museum (Norsk Jernbanemuseum) is also in Hamar. Hamar Airport, Stafsberg serves general aviation out of Hamar. The European route E6 highway and the Norwegian National Road 3 both cross through the municipality.
