= Slemsrud =

Village in Hamar Municipality, Norway

Slemsrud Vangsås / Øvre Vang (historic)
- Village
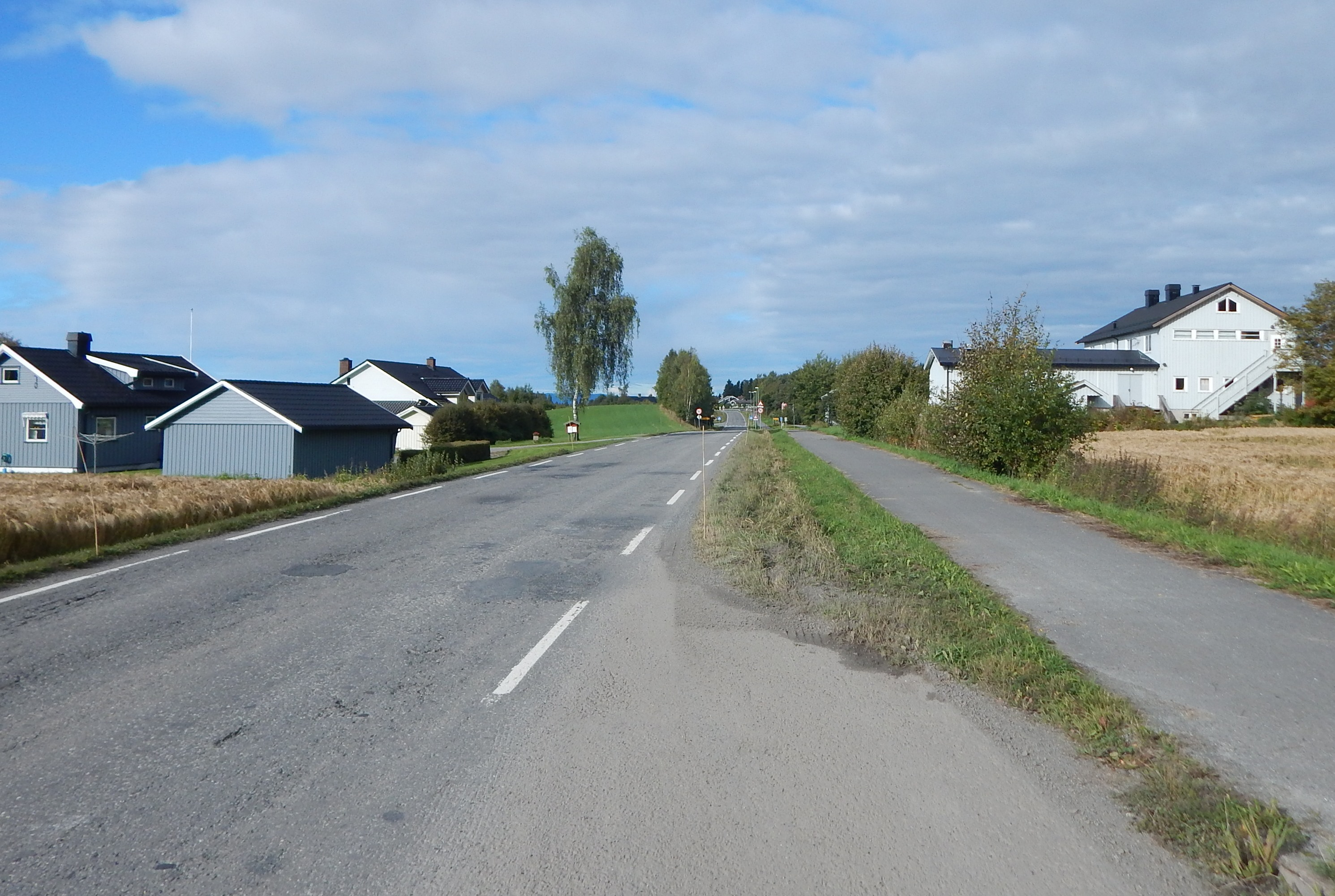
- View of the village
- Interactive map of Slemsrud
- Location within Innlandet Location within Norway
- Coordinates: 60.84697°N 11.20084°E
- Country: Norway
- Region: Eastern Norway
- County: Innlandet
- District: Hedmarken
- Municipality: Hamar Municipality

Area
  - Total: 0.46 km^{2} (0.18 sq mi)
- Elevation: 282 m (925 ft)

Population (2024)
  - Total: 580
  - Density: 1,261/km^{2} (3,270/sq mi)
- Time zone: UTC+01:00 (CET)
  - Summer (DST): UTC+02:00 (CEST)
- Post Code: 2324 Vang på Hedmarken

Slemsrud (also known as Øvre Vang or Vangsås) is a village in Hamar Municipality in Innlandet county, Norway. The village is located about 10 kilometres (6.2 mi) northeast of the town of Hamar. This village is the site of the Øvre Vang Church.

The 0.46-square-kilometre (110-acre) village has a population (2024) of 580 and a population density of 1,261 inhabitants per square kilometre (3,270/sq mi).

== History ==
Prior to 1992, this area was part of the old Vang Municipality, hence the old names of the village Vangsås (lit. 'Vang's hill') and Øvre Vang (lit. 'upper Vang'). Statistics Norway and Norwegian Mapping Authority both use the name Slemsrud for the village now.
