= Ingeberg =

Village in Hamar Municipality, Norway

- Village
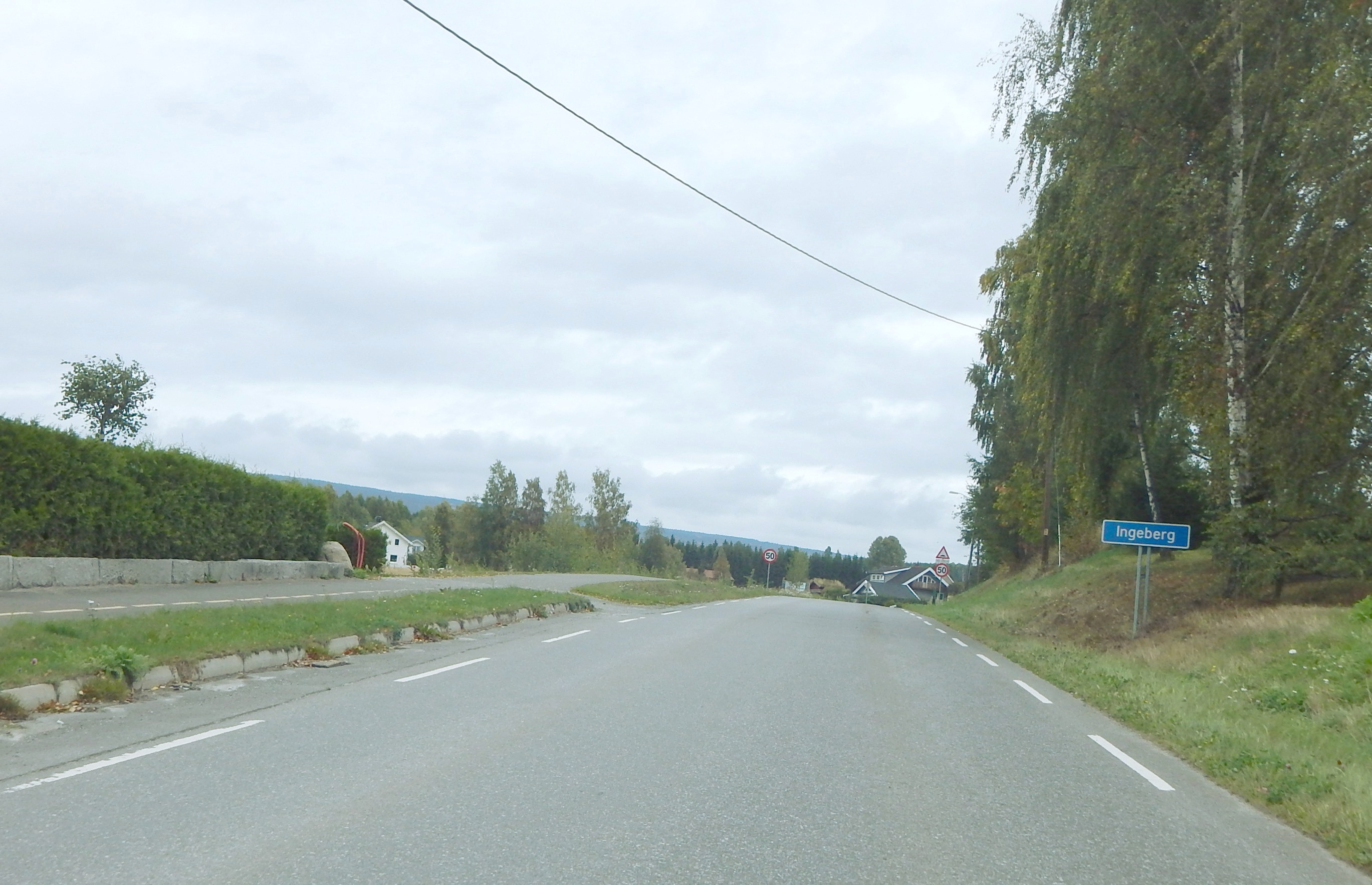
- View of the road leading into the village
- Interactive map of Ingeberg
- Location within Innlandet Location within Norway
- Coordinates: 60.82822°N 11.13667°E
- Country: Norway
- Region: Eastern Norway
- County: Innlandet
- District: Hedmarken
- Municipality: Hamar Municipality

Area
  - Total: 0.47 km^{2} (0.18 sq mi)
- Elevation: 197 m (646 ft)

Population (2024)
  - Total: 927
  - Density: 1,972/km^{2} (5,110/sq mi)
- Time zone: UTC+01:00 (CET)
  - Summer (DST): UTC+02:00 (CEST)
- Post Code: 2323 Ingeberg

Ingeberg is a village in Hamar Municipality in Innlandet county, Norway. The village is located about 3.5 kilometres (2.2 mi) north of the village of Ridabu and about 5 kilometres (3.1 mi) northeast of the town of Hamar.

The 0.47-square-kilometre (120-acre) village has a population (2024) of 927 and a population density of 1,972 inhabitants per square kilometre (5,110/sq mi).

== History ==
The earliest existing document mentioning the village is dated 1339. This document is currently held in the state archives at Hamar.
