= Andreas Karset =

Norwegian politician (1859–1914)

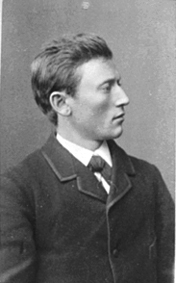

Andreas Kristiansen Karset (27 January 1859 – 5 October 1914) was a Norwegian farmer and politician for the Liberal Party.

He was born at Karset farm in Vang Municipality in Hedmark. He attended Sagatun Folk High School, but was a farmer from 1884. He bought the farm Hol (also in Vang Municipality) and lived there. He was married to Johanne, née Hafsahl and by the time of his death he had four sons.

He was the manager of Vangs Brænderi from 1884 to 1909, then a board member of the same company. He managed the local Bank of Norway branch (in Hamar) in the last nine years of his life, was a board member of Hamar, Vang og Furnes Kommunale Kraftselskap, of Riksskattestyret and the county commission on railways.

He was elected to the municipal council for Vang Municipality, and served as mayor of Vang from 1904 to 1913. He was elected to the Parliament of Norway in 1900, representing the constituency of Hedemarkens Amt. He only served one term, after declining a renomination in 1903. In 1906 he ran for general election again, in the constituency Søndre Hedemarken (the constituency system had been redrawn). He officially ran for the Liberal Party, but after the events of 1905 he associated himself more with the more right-winged Coalition Party. Some liberals fielded the candidate A. Tøsti to split the liberal vote, but Karset nonetheless won the first round of voting against Labour Democrat Thore Myrvang. In the second round, Myrvang acquired the social democratic vote and Karset was edged out with 1,823 against Myrvang's 1,967 votes. Karset did not stand for general election again.

Karset died in October 1914, only 55 years old, after a long-term illness.
