= Vang Municipality (Hedmark) =

Former municipality in Hedmark, Norway

Vang Municipality Vang kommune
- Former municipality
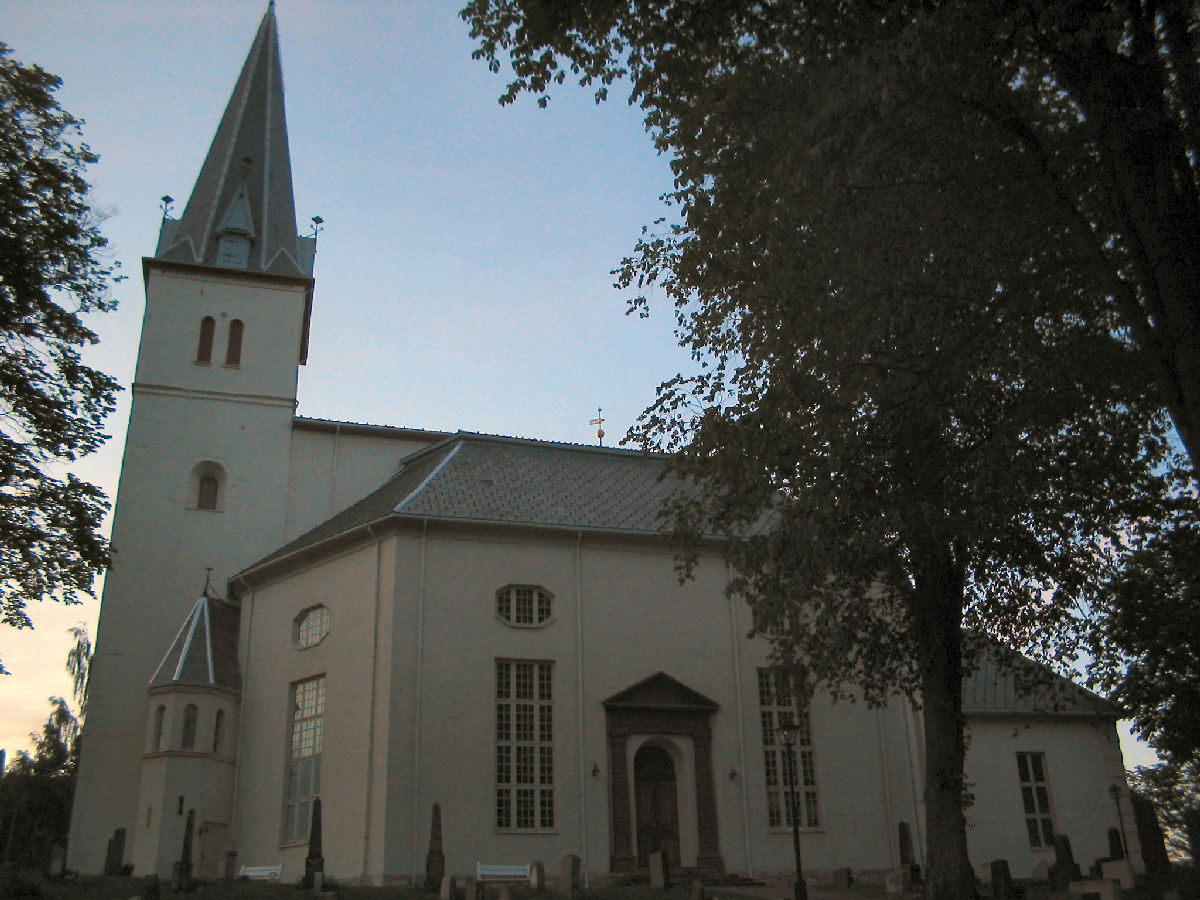
- View of the local Vang Church

- Hedmark within Norway

- Vang within Hedmark
- Coordinates: 60°48′17″N 11°06′28″E
- Country: Norway
- County: Hedmark
- District: Hedmarken
- Established: 1 Jan 1838
  - Created as: Formannskapsdistrikt
- Disestablished: 1 Jan 1992
  - Succeeded by: Hamar Municipality
- Administrative centre: Fredvang

Government
  - Mayor (1988-1991): Odd Aspeli (Ap)

Area (upon dissolution)
  - Total: 326.5 km^{2} (126.1 sq mi)
  - Rank: #264 in Norway
- Highest elevation: 931.67 m (3,056.7 ft)

Population (1991)
  - Total: 9,103
  - Rank: #110 in Norway
  - Density: 27.9/km^{2} (72/sq mi)
  - Change (10 years): ▲ +2.9%
- Demonym: Vangssokning

Official language
  - Norwegian form: Bokmål
- Time zone: UTC+01:00 (CET)
  - Summer (DST): UTC+02:00 (CEST)
- ISO 3166 code: NO-0414

Vang is a former municipality in the old Hedmark county, Norway. The 326.5-square-kilometre (126.1 sq mi) municipality existed from 1838 until its dissolution in 1992. The area is now part of Hamar Municipality in the traditional district of Hedmarken. The administrative centre of the municipality was at Fredvang. This site, however became part of the town of Hamar in 1946, so after that time, the municipal administration was actually located outside of Vang Municipality in the neighboring Hamar Municipality. The main church for the municipality was Vang Church in the village of Ridabu.

Prior to its dissolution in 1992, the 326.5-square-kilometre (126.1 sq mi) municipality was the 264th largest by area out of the 448 municipalities in Norway. Vang Municipality was the 110th most populous municipality in Norway with a population of about 9,103. The municipality's population density was 27.9 inhabitants per square kilometre (72/sq mi) and its population had increased by 2.9% over the previous 10-year period.

Gåsbu Ski Center lies in the Vang commons (a rural area in the northern part of the municipality). It has served as the backup venue for the Holmenkollrennene. This arena has been described as the cradle of all Nordic ski competition, with more than 112 years of international ski competition. The national cross-country skiing championship was last held here in 2002.

== General information ==
The historic prestegjeld of Vang was established as a municipality on 1 January 1838 (see formannskapsdistrikt law). In 1848, the village of Hamar was granted kjøpstad status for a land area of about 400 decares (99 acres). This newly designated "town" (population: 1,025) was separated from Vang Municipality to become the new Hamar Municipality in 1849. This left Vang Municipality with 7,820 residents. On 1 January 1878, the town of Hamar was enlarged by annexing about 800 decares (200 acres) of land and 138 people from Vang Municipality. In 1891 Vang Municipality was divided: the western district (population: 3,790) became the new Furnes Municipality and the eastern district (population: 5,703) continued on as a smaller Vang Municipality. In 1946, a large area in Vang Municipality which surrounded the town of Hamar (population: 4,087) was transferred out of Vang and into Hamar Municipality. On 13 July 1956, the parts of Vang Municipality located south of the Åkersvika bay (population: 24) were transferred to Stange Municipality.

On 1 January 1964, the Hamarsberget and Vikersødegården exclave areas of Vang Municipality (population: 34) were transferred to the neighboring Ringsaker Municipality. On 1 January 1967 there was a municipal land swap between Vang Municipality and Ringsaker Municipality:

- the 500-decare (120-acre) Stav, Valsigsvea, and Arnkvern Nedre areas of Vang Municipality (population: 50) was transferred to Ringsaker Municipality
- the 450-decare (110-acre) Stensby and Holmlund areas of Ringsaker Municipality (population: 114) was transferred to Vang Municipality.

On 1 January 1992, Vang Municipality (population: 9,103) was merged with the town of Hamar (population: 16,351) and parts of the Stensby, Hanstad, Viker, and Stammerud areas of Ringsaker Municipality (population: 224) to form a new, larger Hamar Municipality.

=== Name ===
The municipality (originally the parish) is named after the old Vang farm (Old Norse: Vangr) since the first Vang Church was built there. The name is identical to the word vangr which means "meadow" or "field". Since the municipal consolidation in 1992, the name Øvre Vang (meaning "upper Vang") is used locally as the common name for the area outside the town of Hamar that was once part of the old municipality of Vang.

=== Churches ===
The Church of Norway had one parish (sokn) within Vang Municipality. It is part of the Hamar domprosti (arch-deanery) in the Diocese of Hamar.

Churches in Vang Municipality
Parish (sokn)	Church name	Location of the church	Year built
Vang	Vang Church	Ridabu	1810
Vang	Øvre Vang Church	Slemsrud	1907

== History ==
=== Early history ===
Archeological evidence provides ties between the Vendel era culture in Uppland and Vang in the period from 600 to 800 AD. Most notable is finding of a fine examples of a Vendel Culture style ring sword in Vang burial mounds; each sword's hilt is adorned with a heavy gold ring upon which oaths were sworn. The use of the ring sword is also mentioned in Beowulf and the Eddas.

Åker gård (Aaker farm) in Vang was the site of an ancient Thing (ting) place; it was there that King Magnus I agreed to share power with his uncle Harald Hardråde and the two became co-rulers. In the 11th century the Thing was moved to Eidsvol.

Åker remained a king's farm during the Viking period, as well as a local headquarters for the military. At the end of the Hannibal War, General Georg von Reichwein was granted Åker gård as his residence. During the following years it continued to be the residence of senior military officers. Jørgen Otto Brockenhuus, founder of the Brockenhuss–Schack family, resided there in the early 18th century.

=== 19th-20th centuries ===
Vang Municipality was established in 1837, when the formannskapsdistrikt law came into effect. The municipal borders were those which had been established by a commission in 1730 which set the borders of the Church of Norway prestegjelds. It was named after Vang Church; since the early Iron Age the region had been known as Ridabu.

In 1847, the government determined that Hamar should be restored to kjøpstad status, but the decision was controversial and some believed the basis for the decision was illogical. When Hamar achieved this status in 1849, about 0.4 square kilometres (0.15 sq mi) of land was removed from Vang Municipality and this area became the new Hamar Municipality. Vang Municipality gave up additional land to Hamar in 1878, 1946, 1947 and 1965. In 1891, the western part of Vang Municipality was separated to become the new Furnes Municipality.

The earliest village was Hjellum - a contraction of «Hjellum-by`n». It was there that the train station for the Rørosbanen line between Elverum and Hamar stopped. In the same place Sanderud asylum (now hospital) was located.

During the Second World War, especially after 1944, many resistance fighters hid in Vangsås. About 70 people found refuge in the Norwegian resistance Milorg's district 77 rural huts. On 26 October, German troops assaulted one of the huts and two resistance fighters were killed. A third escaped miraculously.

After 1947 the Østland District Commandos had their headquarters at Åker gård.

After the Second World War more villages developed: Ridabu, Ingeberg, Vangli, and Wik.

=== Merger with Hamar ===
The government had been debating merging the neighboring municipalities of Vang and Hamar (and sometimes Løten) for several decades. There was strong local opposition in Vang — a referendum held 22 and 23 April 1990 showed 95% of the Vang residents opposed incorporation into Hamar, with a 64.7% turnout rate. Support in Hamar was stronger as Vang was a prosperous farming municipality, while Hamar suffered from urban decay. The Storting forced the merger which took place on 1 January 1992. The sponsor for the consolidation was Odd Aspeli (of the Labour Party). He took over as Mayor of Hamar Municipality after consolidation and remained as mayor until 1999. Another chief sponsor against consolidation, Einar Busterud, then assumed the position of mayor.

== Geography ==
Vang Municipality was located in the traditional district of Hedmarken. Åmot Municipality was to the north, Løten Municipality was to the east, Stange Municipality was to the south, Hamar Municipality was to the southwest, and Ringsaker Municipality was to the west. The highest point in the municipality was the 931.67-metre (3,056.7 ft) point on the side of Kroksjøhøgda (the mountain itself is located in neighboring Ringsaker Municipality, and this point on the side of the mountain lies along the municipal border).

== Government ==
While it existed, Vang Municipality was responsible for primary education (through 10th grade), outpatient health services, senior citizen services, welfare and other social services, zoning, economic development, and municipal roads and utilities. The municipality was governed by a municipal council of directly elected representatives. The mayor was indirectly elected by a vote of the municipal council. The municipality was under the jurisdiction of the Sør-Hedmark District Court and the Eidsivating Court of Appeal.

=== Municipal council ===
The municipal council (Kommunestyre) of Vang Municipality was made up of 29 representatives that were elected to four year terms. The tables below show the historical composition of the council by political party.

Vang kommunestyre 1987–1991
Party name (in Norwegian)	Number of representatives
Labour Party (Arbeiderpartiet)	20
Conservative Party (Høyre)	5
Centre Party (Senterpartiet)	2
Socialist Left Party (Sosialistisk Venstreparti)	2
Total number of members:	29
Note: On 1 January 1992, Vang Municipality became part of Hamar Municipality.

Vang kommunestyre 1983–1987
Party name (in Norwegian)	Number of representatives
Labour Party (Arbeiderpartiet)	19
Conservative Party (Høyre)	5
Centre Party (Senterpartiet)	3
Socialist Left Party (Sosialistisk Venstreparti)	2
Total number of members:	29

Vang kommunestyre 1979–1983
Party name (in Norwegian)	Number of representatives
Labour Party (Arbeiderpartiet)	19
Conservative Party (Høyre)	4
Christian Democratic Party (Kristelig Folkeparti)	1
Centre Party (Senterpartiet)	3
Socialist Left Party (Sosialistisk Venstreparti)	2
Total number of members:	29

Vang kommunestyre 1975–1979
Party name (in Norwegian)	Number of representatives
Labour Party (Arbeiderpartiet)	20
Conservative Party (Høyre)	3
Christian Democratic Party (Kristelig Folkeparti)	1
Centre Party (Senterpartiet)	3
Socialist Left Party (Sosialistisk Venstreparti)	2
Total number of members:	29

Vang kommunestyre 1971–1975
Party name (in Norwegian)	Number of representatives
Labour Party (Arbeiderpartiet)	21
Conservative Party (Høyre)	2
Centre Party (Senterpartiet)	4
Socialist People's Party (Sosialistisk Folkeparti)	2
Total number of members:	29

Vang kommunestyre 1967–1971
Party name (in Norwegian)	Number of representatives
Labour Party (Arbeiderpartiet)	21
Conservative Party (Høyre)	3
Centre Party (Senterpartiet)	4
Socialist People's Party (Sosialistisk Folkeparti)	1
Total number of members:	29

Vang kommunestyre 1963–1967
Party name (in Norwegian)	Number of representatives
Labour Party (Arbeiderpartiet)	20
Conservative Party (Høyre)	3
Communist Party (Kommunistiske Parti)	1
Centre Party (Senterpartiet)	4
Socialist People's Party (Sosialistisk Folkeparti)	1
Total number of members:	29

Vang herredsstyre 1959–1963
Party name (in Norwegian)	Number of representatives
Labour Party (Arbeiderpartiet)	21
Conservative Party (Høyre)	2
Communist Party (Kommunistiske Parti)	2
Centre Party (Senterpartiet)	4
Total number of members:	29

Vang herredsstyre 1955–1959
Party name (in Norwegian)	Number of representatives
Labour Party (Arbeiderpartiet)	21
Conservative Party (Høyre)	2
Communist Party (Kommunistiske Parti)	2
Farmers' Party (Bondepartiet)	4
Total number of members:	29

Vang herredsstyre 1951–1955
Party name (in Norwegian)	Number of representatives
Labour Party (Arbeiderpartiet)	19
Conservative Party (Høyre)	2
Communist Party (Kommunistiske Parti)	2
Farmers' Party (Bondepartiet)	4
Liberal Party (Venstre)	1
Total number of members:	28

Vang herredsstyre 1947–1951
Party name (in Norwegian)	Number of representatives
Labour Party (Arbeiderpartiet)	18
Conservative Party (Høyre)	2
Communist Party (Kommunistiske Parti)	3
Farmers' Party (Bondepartiet)	5
Total number of members:	28

Vang herredsstyre 1946–1947
Party name (in Norwegian)	Number of representatives
Labour Party (Arbeiderpartiet)	17
Conservative Party (Høyre)	2
Communist Party (Kommunistiske Parti)	5
Farmers' Party (Bondepartiet)	4
Total number of members:	28
Note: The municipal boundaries were changed in 1946, significantly changing the total population of the municipality, so a new election was held for a council for 1946-1947.

Vang herredsstyre 1945–1945
Party name (in Norwegian)	Number of representatives
Labour Party (Arbeiderpartiet)	17
Conservative Party (Høyre)	2
Communist Party (Kommunistiske Parti)	5
Christian Democratic Party (Kristelig Folkeparti)	2
Farmers' Party (Bondepartiet)	2
Total number of members:	28
Note: The municipal boundaries were changed in 1946, significantly changing the total population of the municipality, so a new election was held for a council for 1946-1947.

Vang herredsstyre 1937–1941*
Party name (in Norwegian)	Number of representatives
Labour Party (Arbeiderpartiet)	19
Conservative Party (Høyre)	4
Communist Party (Kommunistiske Parti)	2
Farmers' Party (Bondepartiet)	3
Total number of members:	28
Note: Due to the German occupation of Norway during World War II, no elections were held for new municipal councils until after the war ended in 1945.

=== Mayors ===
The mayor (Norwegian: ordfører) of Vang Municipality was the political leader of the municipality and the chairperson of the municipal council. The following people have held this position:

- 1837–1839: Stenersen
- 1840–1842: Ole Nashaug
- 1843–1844: Ole Sæhlie
- 1845–1847: Henrik Christian Borchgrevink
- 1848–1848: C. Rabstad
- 1849–1850: Carl Krog
- 1851–1856: Ole Sæhlie
- 1857–1861: Even Vinsnes
- 1862–1862: Harald Heyerdahl
- 1863–1870: Andreas Olsen Sæhlie
- 1871–1874: Haagen Helstad
- 1875–1880: Ole Rømer Aagard Sandberg (H)
- 1881–1888: Nils Dørum (V)
- 1889–1894: Syver Aalstad (H)
- 1895–1896: Martinus Imerslund
- 1897–1898: Ole Imerslund
- 1899–1900: Syver Aalstad
- 1900–1903: Ole Imerslund
- 1904–1913: Andreas Karset (V)
- 1914–1916: Kristoffer Skraastad (H)
- 1917–1918: Ole Holmen (Ap)
- 1918–1922: Kristoffer Skraastad (H)
- 1923–1928: Ole Sjetne
- 1929–1931: Arne Juland (Ap)
- 1931–1965: Rudolf Hedemann (Ap)
- 1943–1945: Aksel Røhr (NS)
- 1965–1969: Arve Nysted (Ap)
- 1969–1984: Kåre Storsveen (Ap)
- 1984–1987: Ole Andreas Brodal (Ap)
- 1988–1991: Odd Aspeli (Ap)

== Notable people ==
- Werner Hosewinckel Christie (1877–1927), an agricultural researcher
- Werner Christie (1917–2004), a Norwegian air force officer
- Mikkel Dobloug (born 1944), a Nordic combined skier
- Olga Imerslund (1907–1987), a renowned paediatrician
- Abraham Pihl (1756–1821), a clergyman, astronomer, and architect
- Mathias Stoltenberg (1799–1871), a painter
- Ralph Engelstad (1930–2002), an American whose grandfather Peter emigrated from Vang to Minnesota

== See also ==
- List of former municipalities of Norway
