= Furnes Municipality =

Former municipality in Hedmark, Norway

Furnes Municipality Furnes herred
- Former municipality
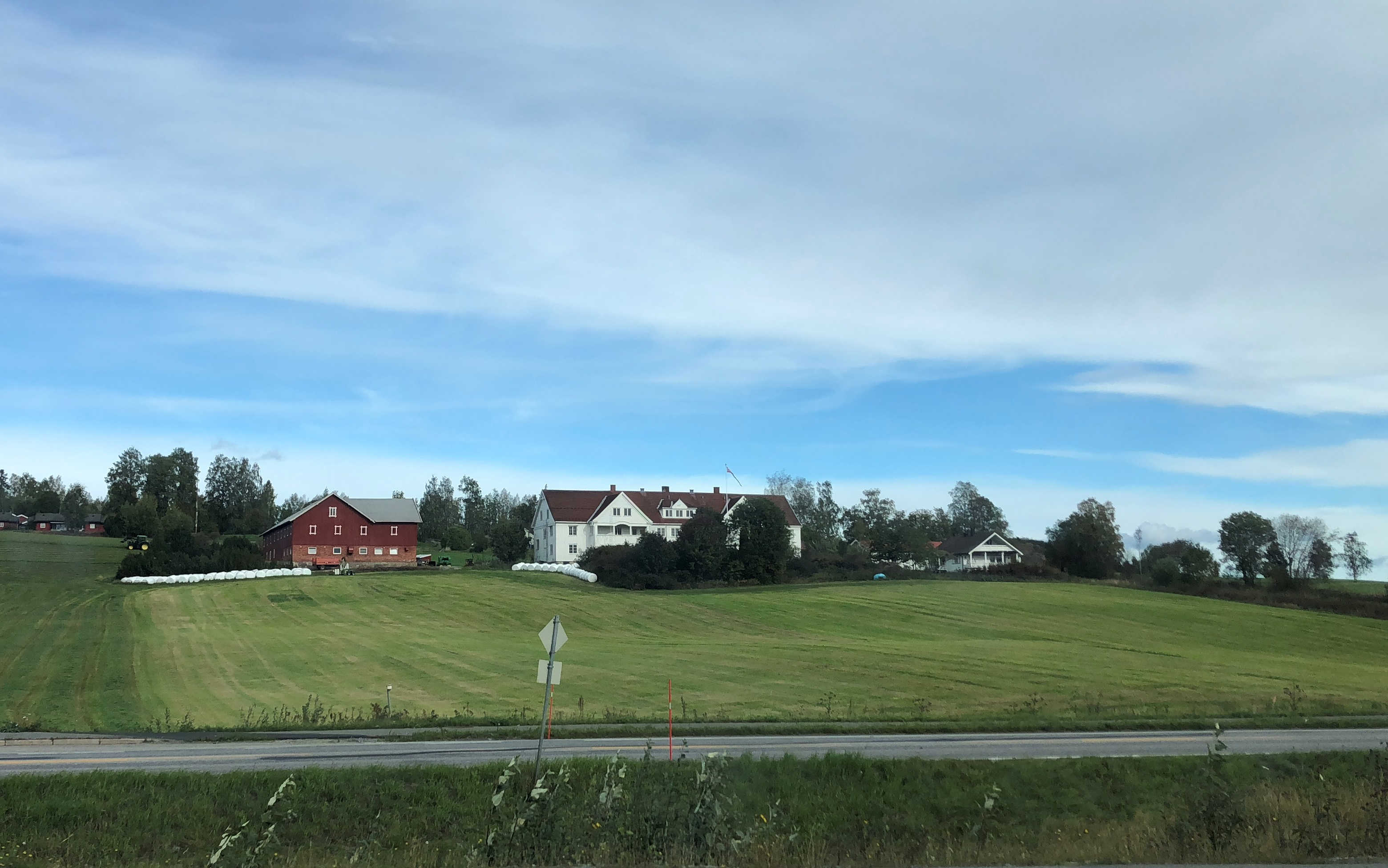
- View of the Myrvoll farm in Furnes

- Hedmark within Norway

- Furnes within Hedmark
- Coordinates: 60°50′30″N 11°01′19″E
- Country: Norway
- County: Hedmark
- District: Hedmarken
- Established: 1891
  - Preceded by: Vang Municipality
- Disestablished: 1 Jan 1964
  - Succeeded by: Ringsaker Municipality
- Administrative centre: Furnes

Government
  - Mayor (1959–1963): Peder Esbjørnsen (Ap)

Area (upon dissolution)
  - Total: 370 km^{2} (140 sq mi)
  - Land: 200.5 km^{2} (77.4 sq mi)
- Highest elevation: 950 m (3,120 ft)

Population (1963)
  - Total: 7,169
  - Rank: #111 in Norway
  - Density: 35.8/km^{2} (93/sq mi)
  - Change (10 years): ▲ +17.6%
- Demonym: Furnesing

Official language
  - Norwegian form: Bokmål
- Time zone: UTC+01:00 (CET)
  - Summer (DST): UTC+02:00 (CEST)
- ISO 3166 code: NO-0413

Furnes is a former municipality in the old Hedmark county, Norway. The 200.5-square-kilometre (77.4 sq mi) municipality existed from 1891 until its dissolution in 1964. The area is now part of Ringsaker Municipality in the traditional district of Hedmarken. The administrative centre was the village of Furnes where the Furnes Church is located.

Prior to its dissolution in 1964, the 200.5-square-kilometre (77.4 sq mi) municipality was the 370th largest by area out of the 689 municipalities in Norway. Furnes Municipality was the 111th most populous municipality in Norway with a population of about 7,169. The municipality's population density was 35.8 inhabitants per square kilometre (93/sq mi) and its population had increased by 17.6% over the previous 10-year period.

== General information ==
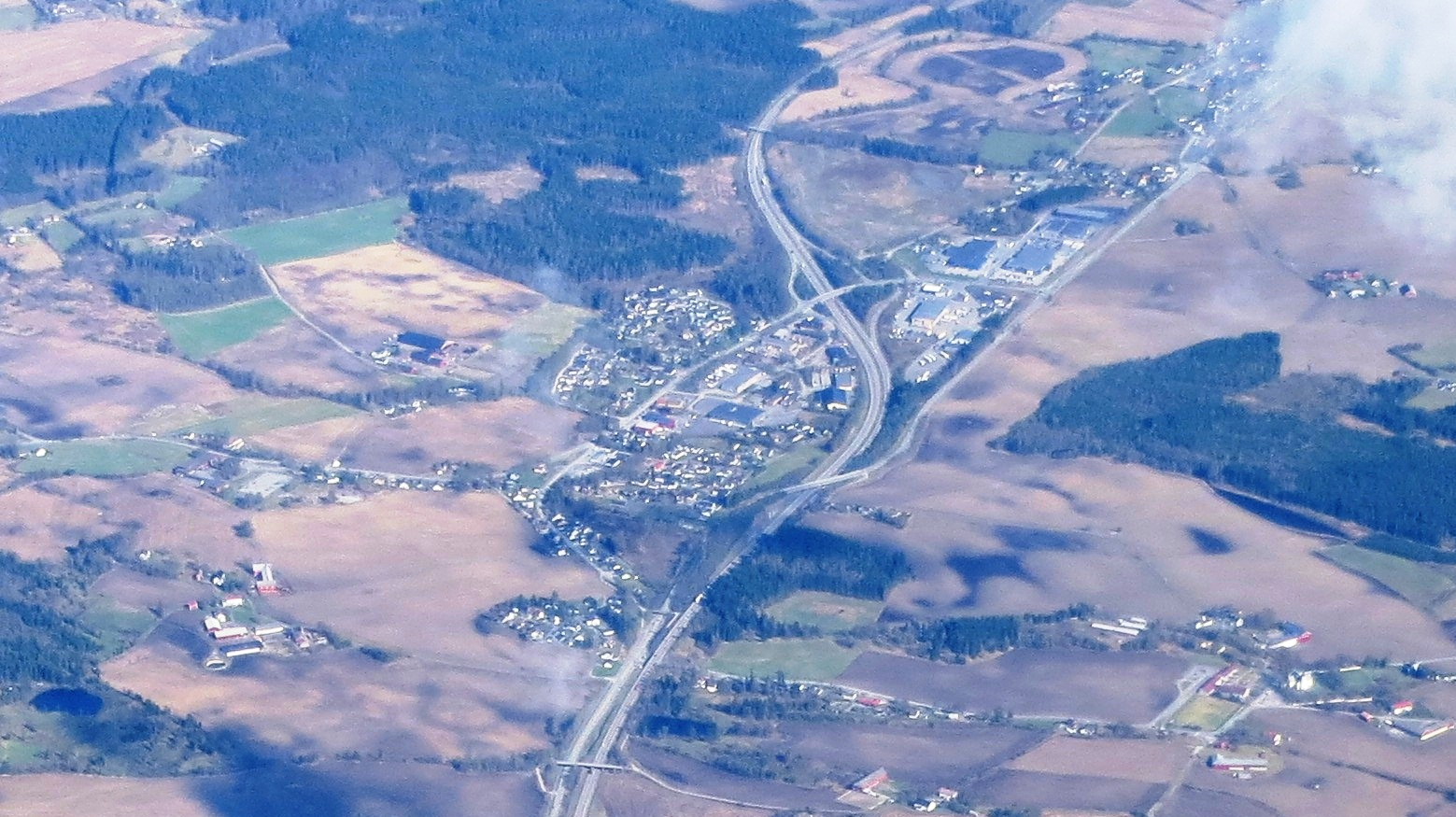
Aerial view of Nydal in Furnes Municipality

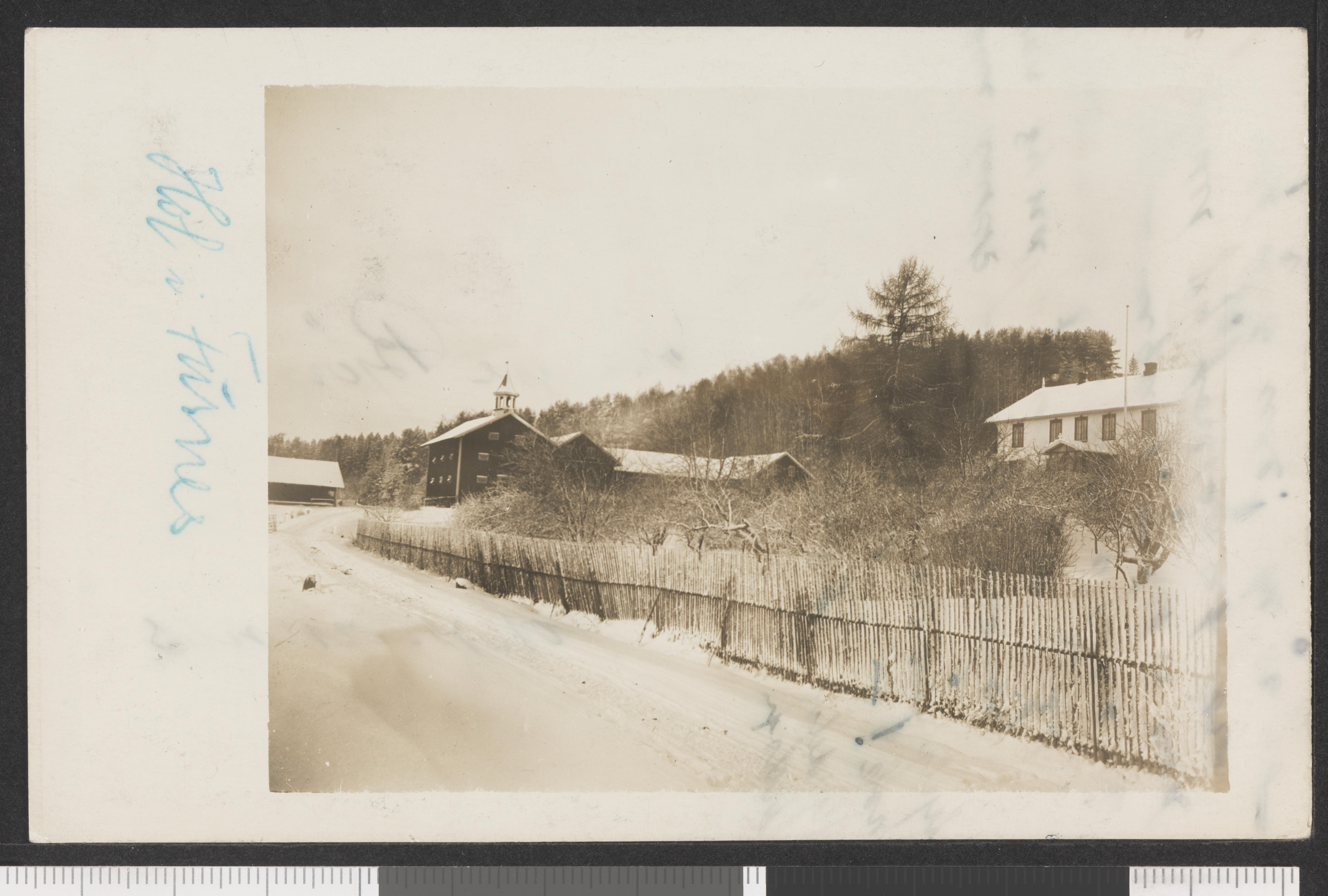
Hol in Furnes Municipality (c. 1910)

The municipality of Furnes was established in 1891 when the old Vang Municipality was divided into two: Furnes Municipality in the west (population: 3,790) and Vang Municipality in the east (population: 5,703). In 1947, a part of Furnes Municipality (population: 821) near the town of Hamar was transferred from Furnes Municipality to Hamar Municipality.

During the 1960s, there were many municipal mergers across Norway due to the work of the Schei Committee. On 1 January 1964, the following areas were merged to form a new, larger Ringsaker Municipality:

- Furnes Municipality (population: 7,288)
- Nes Municipality (population: 4,184)
- Ringsaker Municipality (population: 16,490)
- the Hamarsberget and Vikersødegården areas of Vang Municipality (population: 34)

=== Name ===
The municipality (originally the parish) is named after the old village of Furnes (Old Norse: Furnes) since the first Furnes Church was built there. The first element of the name has an unknown meaning, but it may have come from a local river such as Fura. Another possibility is that it comes from the word furu which means "pine tree" or "fir tree". The last element is nes which means "headland".

=== Churches ===
The Church of Norway had one parish (sokn) within Furnes Municipality. At the time of the municipal dissolution, it was part of the Furnes prestegjeld and the Hamar domprosti (arch-deanery) in the Diocese of Hamar.

Churches in Furnes Municipality
Parish (sokn)	Church name	Location of the church	Year built
Furnes	Furnes Church	Furnes	1707

== Geography ==
Furnes Municipality was located in the Hedmarken district to the northeast of the large lake Mjøsa. Åmot Municipality was located to the north, Vang Municipality was located to the east, Hamar Municipality was located to the south, Nes Municipality was located to the southwest, and Ringsaker Municipality was located to the west. The highest point in the municipality was the 950-metre (3,120 ft) tall mountain Kroksjøhøgda in the far northern part of the municipality.

== Government ==
While it existed, Furnes Municipality was responsible for primary education (through 10th grade), outpatient health services, senior citizen services, welfare and other social services, zoning, economic development, and municipal roads and utilities. The municipality was governed by a municipal council of directly elected representatives. The mayor was indirectly elected by a vote of the municipal council. The municipality was under the jurisdiction of the Eidsivating Court of Appeal.

=== Municipal council ===
The municipal council (Herredsstyre) of Furnes Municipality was made up of 23 representatives that were elected to four-year terms. The tables below show the historical composition of the council by political party.

Furnes herredsstyre 1959–1963
Party name (in Norwegian)	Number of representatives
Labour Party (Arbeiderpartiet)	15
Conservative Party (Høyre)	4
Christian Democratic Party (Kristelig Folkeparti)	1
Centre Party (Senterpartiet)	3
Total number of members:	23
Note: On 1 January 1964, Furnes Municipality became part of Ringsaker Municipality.

Furnes herredsstyre 1955–1959
Party name (in Norwegian)	Number of representatives
Labour Party (Arbeiderpartiet)	15
Conservative Party (Høyre)	3
Communist Party (Kommunistiske Parti)	1
Farmers' Party (Bondepartiet)	3
Joint List(s) of Non-Socialist Parties (Borgerlige Felleslister)	1
Total number of members:	23

Furnes herredsstyre 1951–1955
Party name (in Norwegian)	Number of representatives
Labour Party (Arbeiderpartiet)	12
Farmers' Party (Bondepartiet)	3
Joint List(s) of Non-Socialist Parties (Borgerlige Felleslister)	5
Total number of members:	20

Furnes herredsstyre 1947–1951
Party name (in Norwegian)	Number of representatives
Labour Party (Arbeiderpartiet)	12
Joint List(s) of Non-Socialist Parties (Borgerlige Felleslister)	8
Total number of members:	20

Furnes herredsstyre 1945–1947
Party name (in Norwegian)	Number of representatives
Labour Party (Arbeiderpartiet)	13
Joint List(s) of Non-Socialist Parties (Borgerlige Felleslister)	7
Total number of members:	20

Furnes herredsstyre 1937–1941*
Party name (in Norwegian)	Number of representatives
Labour Party (Arbeiderpartiet)	10
Joint List(s) of Non-Socialist Parties (Borgerlige Felleslister)	10
Total number of members:	20
Note: Due to the German occupation of Norway during World War II, no elections were held for new municipal councils until after the war ended in 1945.

=== Mayors ===
The mayor (Norwegian: ordfører) of Furnes Municipality was the political leader of the municipality and the chairperson of the municipal council. The following people have held this position:

- 1891–1894: Lars Jesnæs (H)
- 1895–1896: Ole Rømer Aagaard Sandberg (H)
- 1897–1901: Erik Maurud (H)
- 1902–1907: Andreas H. Jestnæs (H)
- 1908–1910: Erik Jevanord
- 1911–1919: Børre Vik (H)
- 1920–1925: Per L. Alhaug
- 1926–1937: Karl Gålås (Bp)
- 1938–1940: Knud Lundby (H)
- 1941–1944: Karl Bakken (NS)
- 1945–1945: Knud Lundby (H)
- 1946–1958: Ole Haget (Ap)
- 1959–1963: Peder Esbjørnsen (Ap)

== See also ==
- List of former municipalities of Norway
