= Flagstadelva =

River in Innlandet, Norway

Flagstadelva Flakstadelva
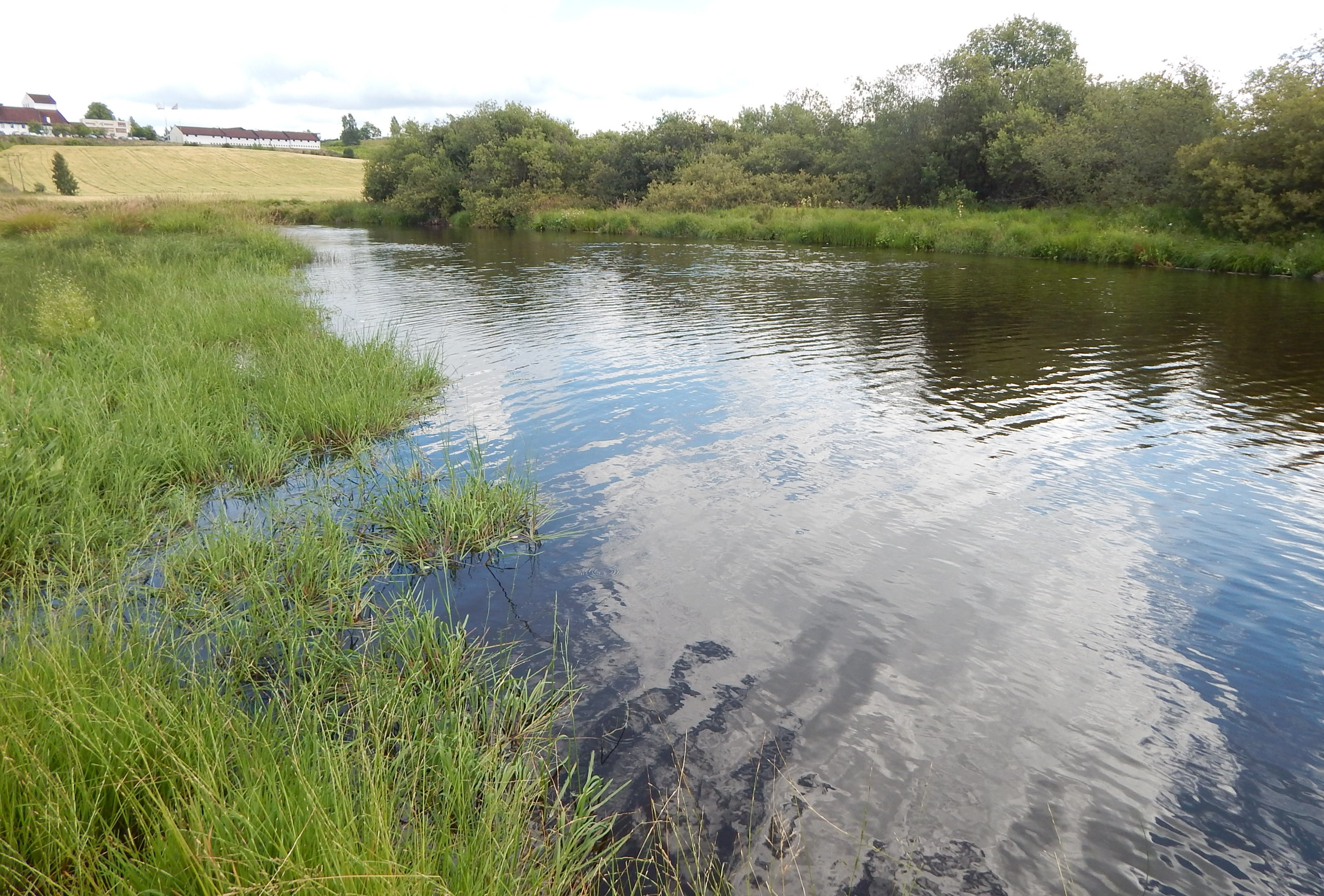
- From the delta area near lake Mjøsa

Location
- Country: Norway
- County: Innlandet
- Municipalities: Hamar Municipality and Ringsaker Municipality

Physical characteristics
- Source: Lavsjømyrene
  - location: Løten Municipality, Norway
  - coordinates: 61.0059°N 11.2369°E
  - elevation: 674 metres (2,211 ft)
- Mouth: Lake Mjøsa
  - location: Hamar Municipality, Norway
  - coordinates: 60.7968°N 11.1037°E
  - elevation: 123 metres (404 ft)
- Length: 32.6 km (20.3 mi)
- Basin size: 179.88 km^{2} (69.45 sq mi)
- Discharge
  - average: 1.96 m^{3}/s (69 cu ft/s)

Flagstadelva is a river in Innlandet county, Norway. The 32.6-kilometre (20.3 mi) river begins in the Lavsjømyrene bog areas in northern Løten Municipality. From there it runs in a southerly direction and forms the lake Nybusjøen. The river flows through Hamar Municipality and for a short distance forms the border with Ringsaker Municipality too. The river runs through a v-shaped valley which twists before its mouth at the town of Hamar where it empties into the lake Mjøsa. The river's erosion has exposed the lower Cambrian and middle Cambrian rock formations in that region.

== See also ==
- List of rivers in Norway
