= Storhamar Church =

Church in Innlandet, Norway

- Storhamar kirke
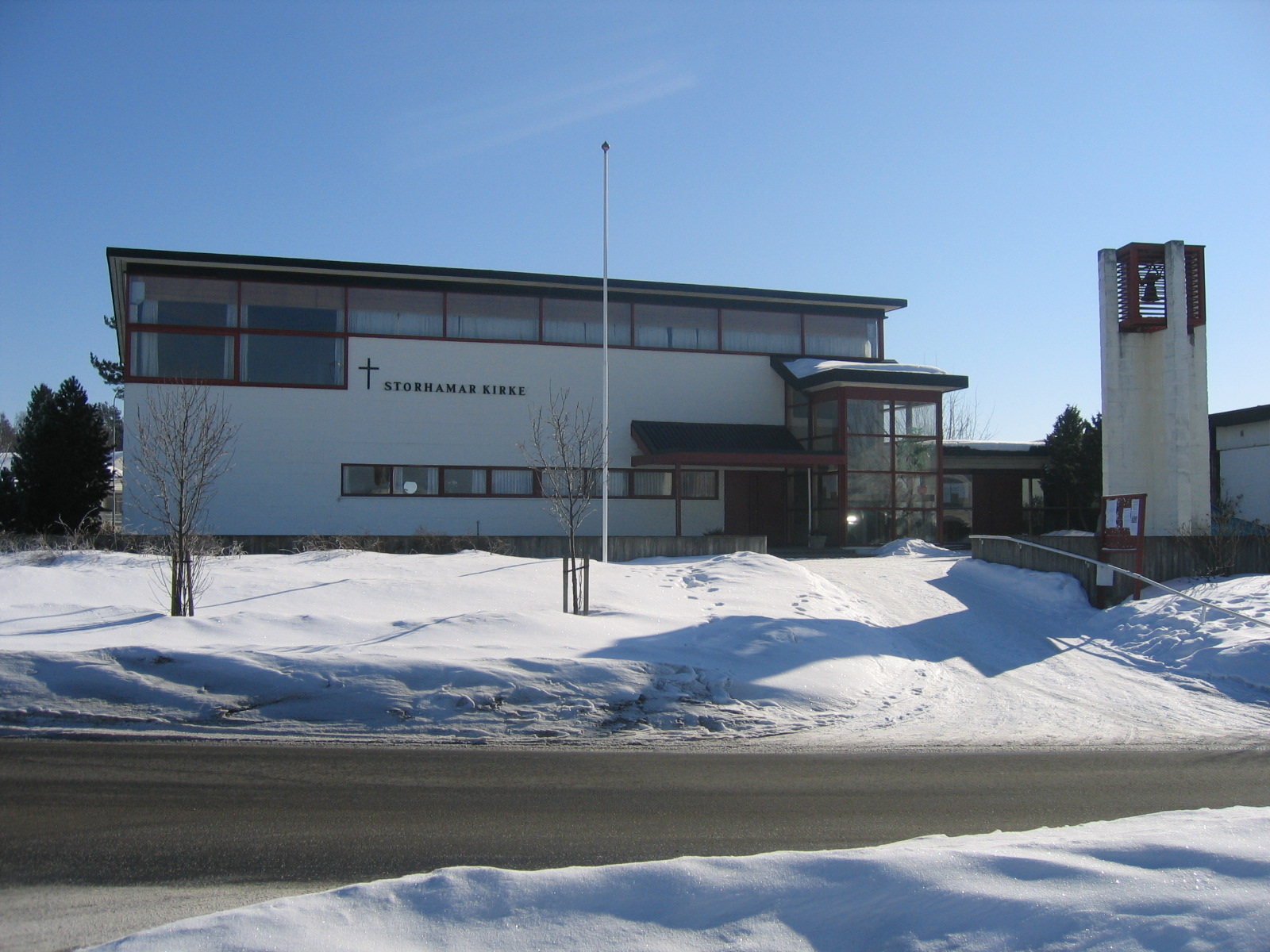
- View of the church
- Storhamar Church
- 60°48′14″N 11°02′47″E
- Location: Hamar Municipality, Innlandet
- Country: Norway
- Denomination: Church of Norway
- Churchmanship: Evangelical Lutheran

History
- Status: Parish church
- Founded: 1975
- Consecrated: 5 October 1975

Architecture
- Functional status: Active
- Architect: Willy Sveen
- Architectural type: Rectangular
- Completed: 1975 (51 years ago)

Specifications
- Capacity: 380
- Materials: Concrete

Administration
- Diocese: Hamar bispedømme
- Deanery: Hamar domprosti
- Parish: Hamar

Storhamar Church (Norwegian: Storhamar kirke) is a parish church of the Church of Norway in Hamar Municipality in Innlandet county, Norway. It is located in the town of Hamar. It is one of the churches for the Hamar parish which is part of the Hamar domprosti (deanery) in the Diocese of Hamar. The white, concrete church was built in a rectangular design in 1975 using plans drawn up by the architect Willy Sveen. The church seats about 380 people.

== History ==
As the town of Hamar grew, the need for a new church in the town became apparent. In 1971, land in a residential area in the west part of the town was acquired for a new church. The church was designed by Willy Sveen. The church was constructed out of concrete blocks during 1974–1975. It was consecrated on 5 October 1975.

== See also ==
- List of churches in Hamar
