= Øvre Vang Church =

Church in Innlandet, Norway

- Øvre Vang kirke
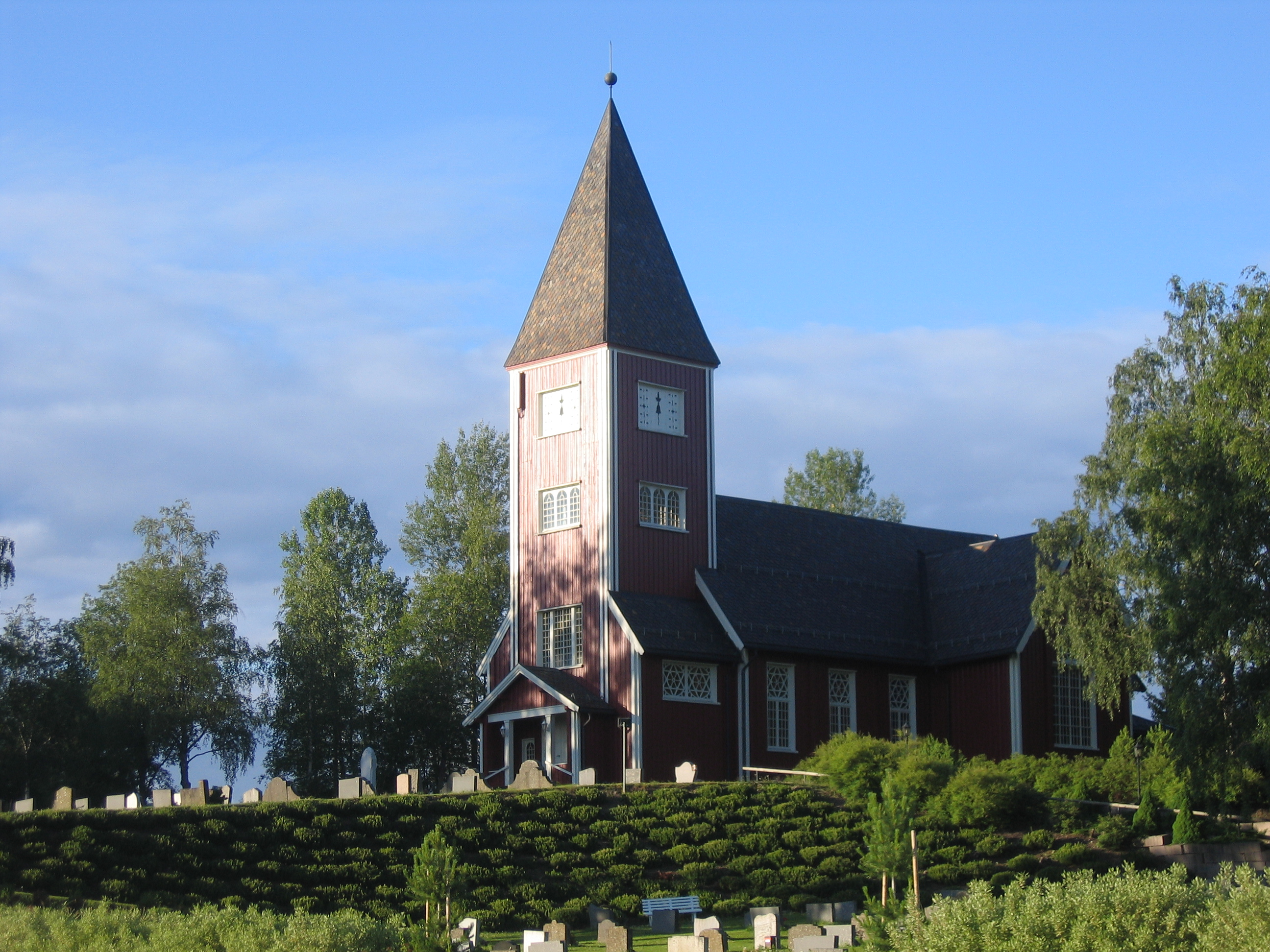
- View of the church
- Øvre Vang Church
- 60°50′45″N 11°12′17″E
- Location: Hamar Municipality, Innlandet
- Country: Norway
- Denomination: Church of Norway
- Churchmanship: Evangelical Lutheran

History
- Former name: Vangsaasens kapell
- Status: Parish church
- Founded: 1907
- Consecrated: 28 August 1907

Architecture
- Functional status: Active
- Architect(s): Johan Joachim Meyer and Andreas Bugge
- Architectural type: Cruciform
- Completed: 1907 (119 years ago)

Specifications
- Capacity: 300
- Materials: Wood

Administration
- Diocese: Hamar bispedømme
- Deanery: Hamar domprosti
- Parish: Vang
- Norwegian Cultural Heritage Site
- Type: Church
- Status: Protected
- ID: 85931

Øvre Vang Church (Norwegian: Øvre Vang kirke) is a parish church of the Church of Norway in Hamar Municipality in Innlandet county, Norway. It is located in the village of Slemsrud. It is one of the churches for the Vang parish which is part of the Hamar domprosti (deanery) in the Diocese of Hamar. The red, wooden church was built in a cruciform design in 1907 using plans drawn up by the architects Johan Joachim Meyer and Andreas Bugge. The church seats about 300 people.

== History ==
In 1901, the municipal council of Vang Municipality began planning for a new annex chapel in the northern part of the municipality. Architectural drafts were designed by Johan Joachim Meyer and later when Meyer was ill, the plans were modified by Andreas Bugge who moved the tower to above the west entrance rather than over the centre of the nave as had first been planned. The church was built from 1903 to 1907. The chapel is a half-timbered cruciform building, but the cross-arms are quite short and the interior is laid out as if it were a long church. The chapel has a west tower above the church porch, a choir in the east, and sacristies on each side of the choir. The new building was consecrated on 28 August 1907 by Bishop Christen Brun. The chapel was originally named Vangsaasen kapell (later it was renamed Øvre Vang kapell). More recently, the chapel was upgraded to parish church status so that the parish of Vang has two churches now.

== Media gallery ==
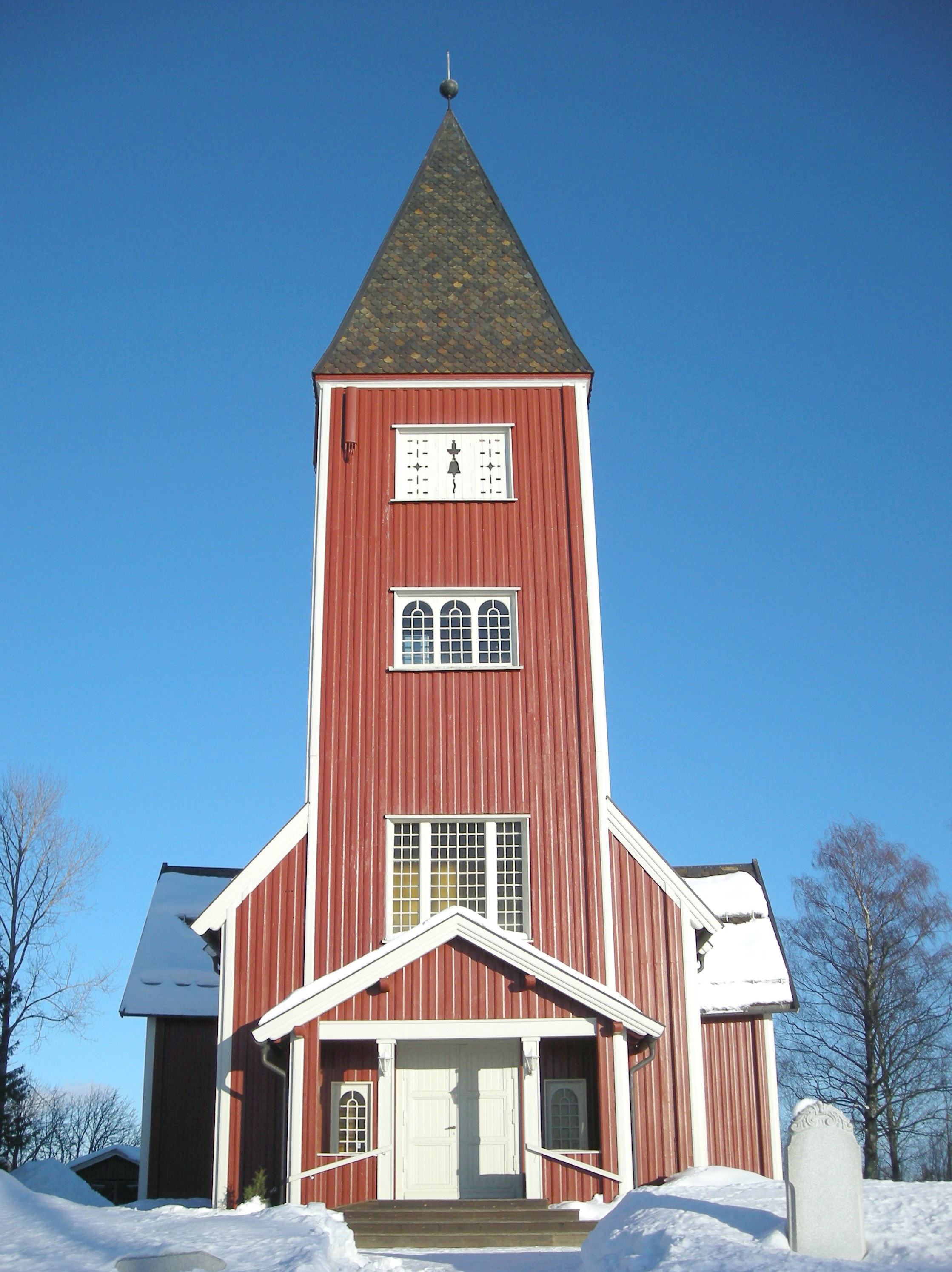

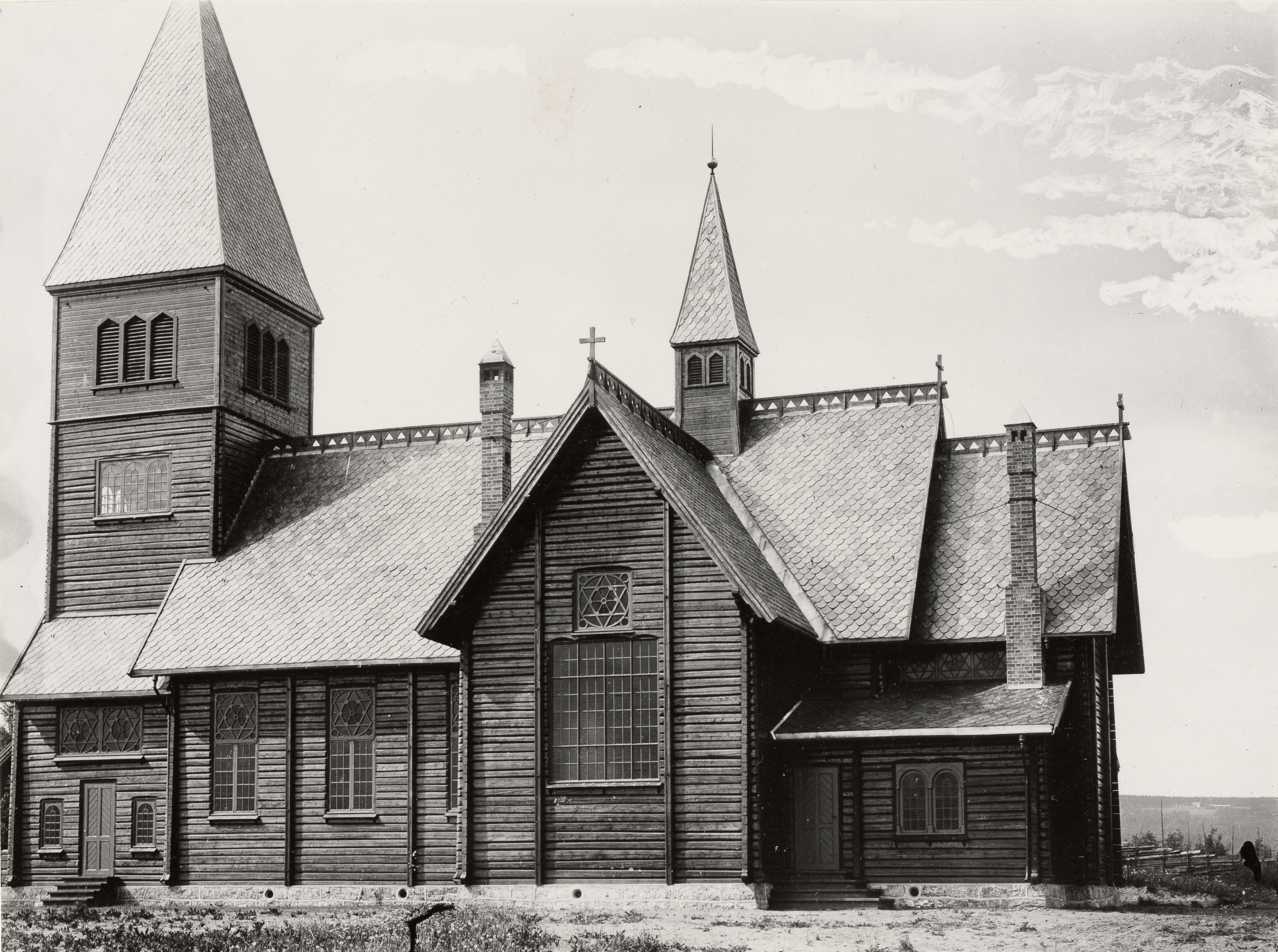

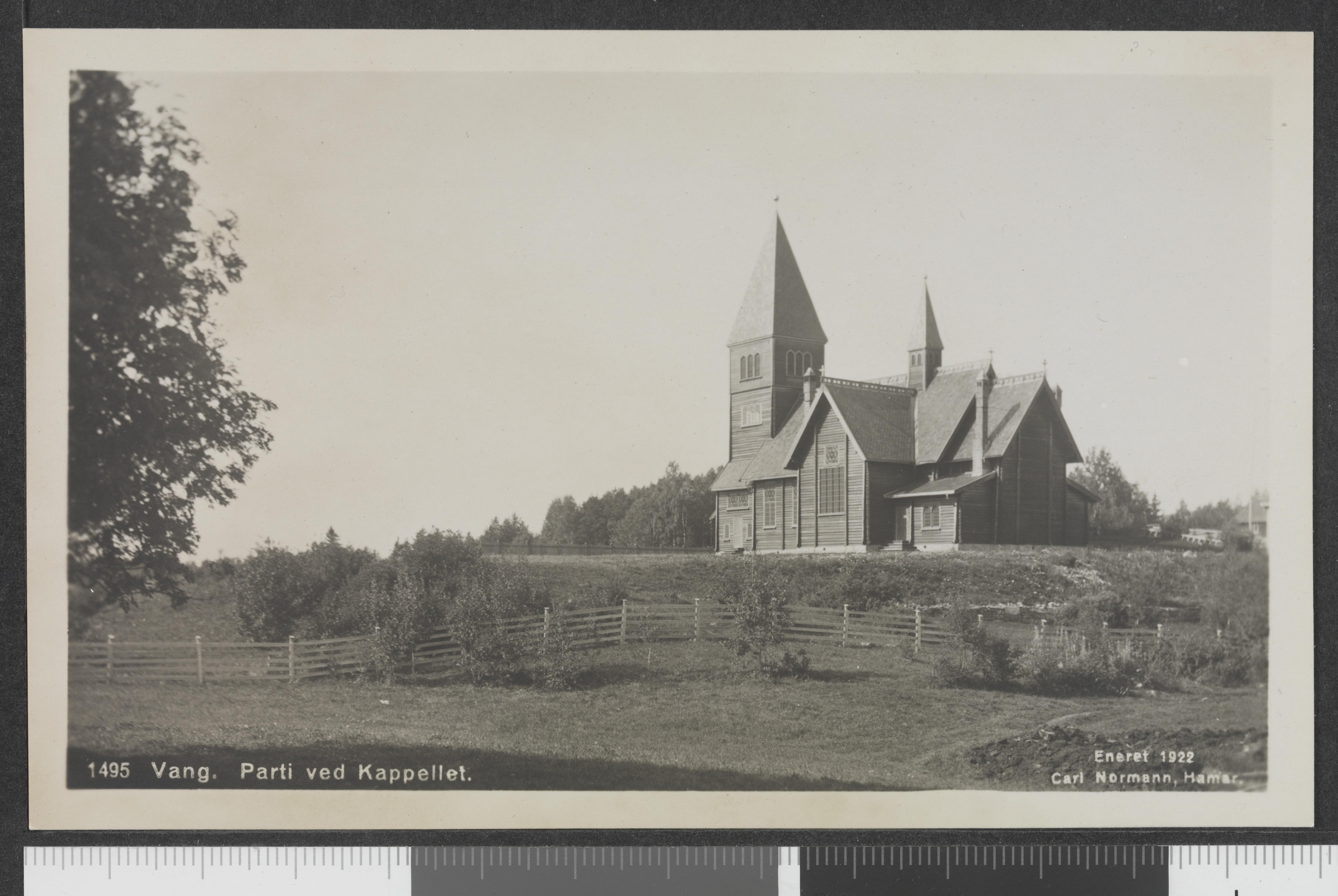

== See also ==
- List of churches in Hamar
