= Gustav Heiberg =

Norwegian barrister and politician

Gustav Heiberg (30 August 1856 – 1 August 1935) was a Norwegian barrister and politician for the Liberal Party.

He was born in Nes Municipality, in Hedmark county, as a son of farmer Peder Heiberg and his wife, née Berthe Skjelve. After finishing his secondary education in 1879 he graduated with the cand.jur. degree in 1882. In the same year, he married Agnete Ousdahl (1852–1930), who also hailed from Nes.

He worked as a teacher from 1882 to 1883, then as an attorney from 1883 with his own lawyer's firm in Hamar. From 1890 he was a barrister with access to Supreme Court cases. He was also a defender in Borgating og Agder Court of Appeal, several district courts and Hamar City Court. From 1927 his son Sigurd Heiberg was a partner in the firm.

He was a member of the Parliament of Norway, representing the constituency Lillehammer, Hamar og Gjøvik and the Liberal Party, from 1892 to 1894. He was a member of the municipal council of Hamar Municipality from 1890 to 1910 and 1914 to 1916. He served as deputy mayor from 1895 to 1901 and mayor in 1908, 1910 and 1914–1916. He died in 1935 in Hamar.
