= Christen Larsen Arneberg =

Norwegian politician

Christen Larsen Arneberg (16 December 1808 – 25 February 1874) was a Norwegian politician.

He was elected to the Norwegian Parliament in 1851, 1854 and 1857, representing the rural constituency of Hedemarkens Amt (today named Hedmark). He worked as a farmer.
