= Espa =

Village in Stange Municipality, Norway

Espa Østjordet
- Village
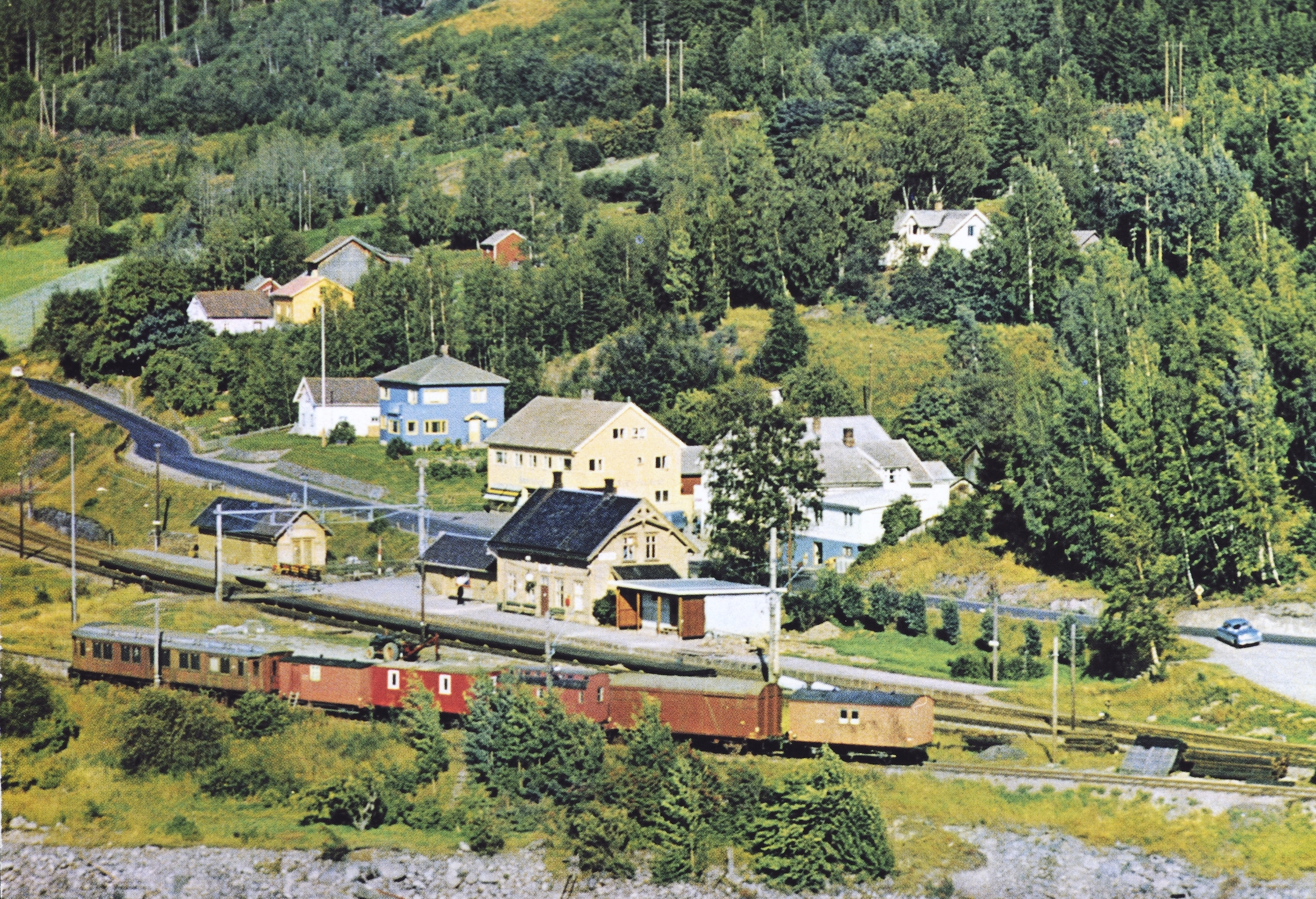
- View of the village
- Interactive map of Espa
- Location within Innlandet Location within Norway
- Coordinates: 60.57958°N 11.2708°E
- Country: Norway
- Region: Eastern Norway
- County: Innlandet
- District: Hedmarken
- Municipality: Stange Municipality
- Elevation: 153 m (502 ft)
- Time zone: UTC+01:00 (CET)
  - Summer (DST): UTC+02:00 (CEST)
- Post Code: 2338 Espa

Espa is a village in Stange Municipality in Innlandet county, Norway. The village is located along the European route E6 highway near the southern part of the large lake Mjøsa, about 5 kilometres (3.1 mi) southeast of the village of Tangen. Its population (SSB 2005) was 191. The Dovrebanen railway line passes through the village. There was a train station in the village, but it was closed in 1983.
