= Kristoffer Skraastad =

Norwegian politician (1865–1948)

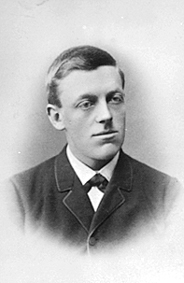
Kristoffer Skraastad

Kristoffer Skraastad (31 July 1865 – 7 March 1948) was a Norwegian farmer and politician for the Conservative Party.

== Biography ==
He was born at Skråstad in Vang Municipality as a son of farmers Gudbrand Rabstad (1833–1896) and Marte Skraastad (1836–1921). He had modest education, but managed Vang Korn- og Frørenseri from 1886 and was then a tenant at the farm Hoel in Vang from 1890 to 1900. In 1900 he bought the family farm Skråstad, running it until passing it down to his son in 1938.

He was a member of the municipal council for Vang Municipality continuously from 1898 to 1928. During these years he served as mayor from 1913 to 1916, deputy mayor until 1917 then mayor again from 1918 to 1922. He was elected to the Parliament of Norway from Hedmark in 1924, and served through one term.

Locally he chaired the board of Hamar Stiftstidende and the distillery Vangs Brænderi, was a board member of Jønsberg School of Agriculture and Hamar Privatbank and was a supervisory council member of Hamar Slagteri (chairman) and Hedmark Meieri. He was also the chief executive of the fire treasury Vang og Furnes Brannkasse from 1903 to 1947. He thus became a board member of the nationwide reinsurance corporation Samtrygd in 1928, advancing to deputy chairman in 1937 and chairman in 1941. He withdrew in 1946 and died two years later.
