= Einar Busterud =

Norwegian politician (born 1953)

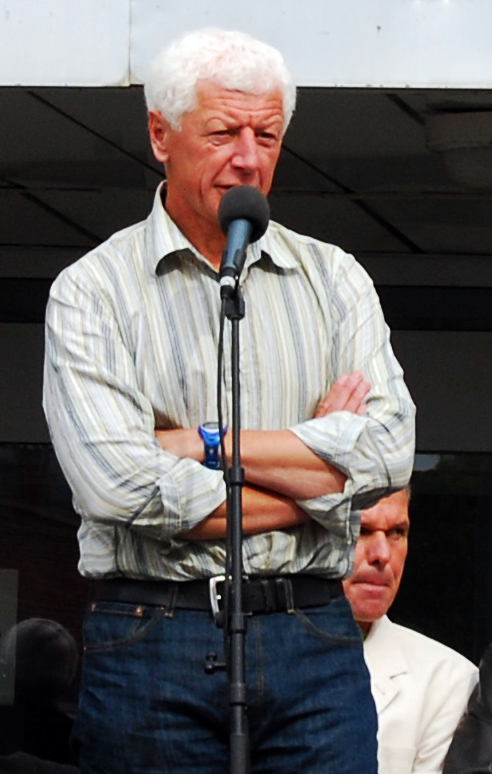
Einar Busterud in September 2007.

Einar Busterud (born 18 September 1953) is a Norwegian politician who since 2015 has been mayor of Hamar.

From 1999 to 2011 he was the mayor of Hamar. He was first elected to city council in 1991. He does not represent a political party, but rather is part of the local bygdeliste called By- og bygdelista. In 2010, he announced he would not be seeking reelection.

Before serving as mayor, Busterud was the managing director of ad agency Ord & Jord. In late 2011 he was hired as director of communications and strategy in Norsk Tipping, effective from 1 January 2012.
