= Ridabu =

Village in Hamar Municipality, Norway

Ridabu Åker
- Village
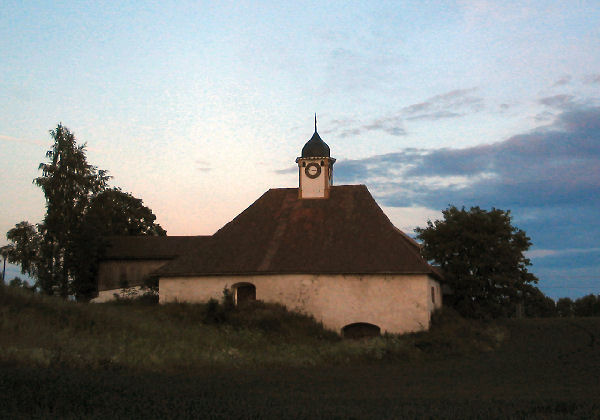
- View of the old barn at the Torshov farm in Ridabu, designed by Abraham Pihl.
- Interactive map of Ridabu
- Location within Innlandet Location within Norway
- Coordinates: 60.80127°N 11.1305°E
- Country: Norway
- Region: Eastern Norway
- County: Innlandet
- District: Hedmarken
- Municipality: Hamar Municipality
- Elevation: 147 m (482 ft)
- Time zone: UTC+01:00 (CET)
  - Summer (DST): UTC+02:00 (CEST)
- Post Code: 2322 Ridabu

Ridabu or Åker is a village in Hamar Municipality in Innlandet county, Norway. The village is located at the intersection of the European route E6 highway and the Norwegian National Road 3. Vang Church is located in the village which lies about 1 kilometre (0.62 mi) east of the town of Hamar.

The suburban village area was once its own separate village, but over time, the town of Hamar was grown and now Ridabu is considered to be the eastern part of the town of Hamar, so population statistics are no longer separately kept for Ridabu. Prior to 1992, Ridabu was a part of the rural municipality Vang Municipality.

== Name ==
The name is very old village name (Old Norse: Ríðabú). The suffix -bú simply means 'built', but the meaning of the first part of the name has no definite interpretation. Several old village names end in -bú, and in those cases the prefix refers to nearby place names. For example, the prefix in the name of Selbu Municipality (Old Norse: Selabú) is named after Seli which is the original name of the lake Selbusjøen. A name of a nearby place such as Ríði could be the source of this name. Once possibility is the noun reiðrf, which means 'red', 'anchorage', or 'open harbor', or the verb ríða, which means 'swing', 'crank', or 'anchor'. One possibility is that the nearby bay could have been historically named something like Ríði with the meaning 'anchorage' or 'harbor'. The nearby Åker farm was an older Iron Age residence for powerful chiefs and small kings. Therefore it is likely that the meaning of the current name Ridabu was originally Ríðabú, which means a village 'built near Ríði' (a bay now called Åkersvika).
