= Hedmarken =

- District
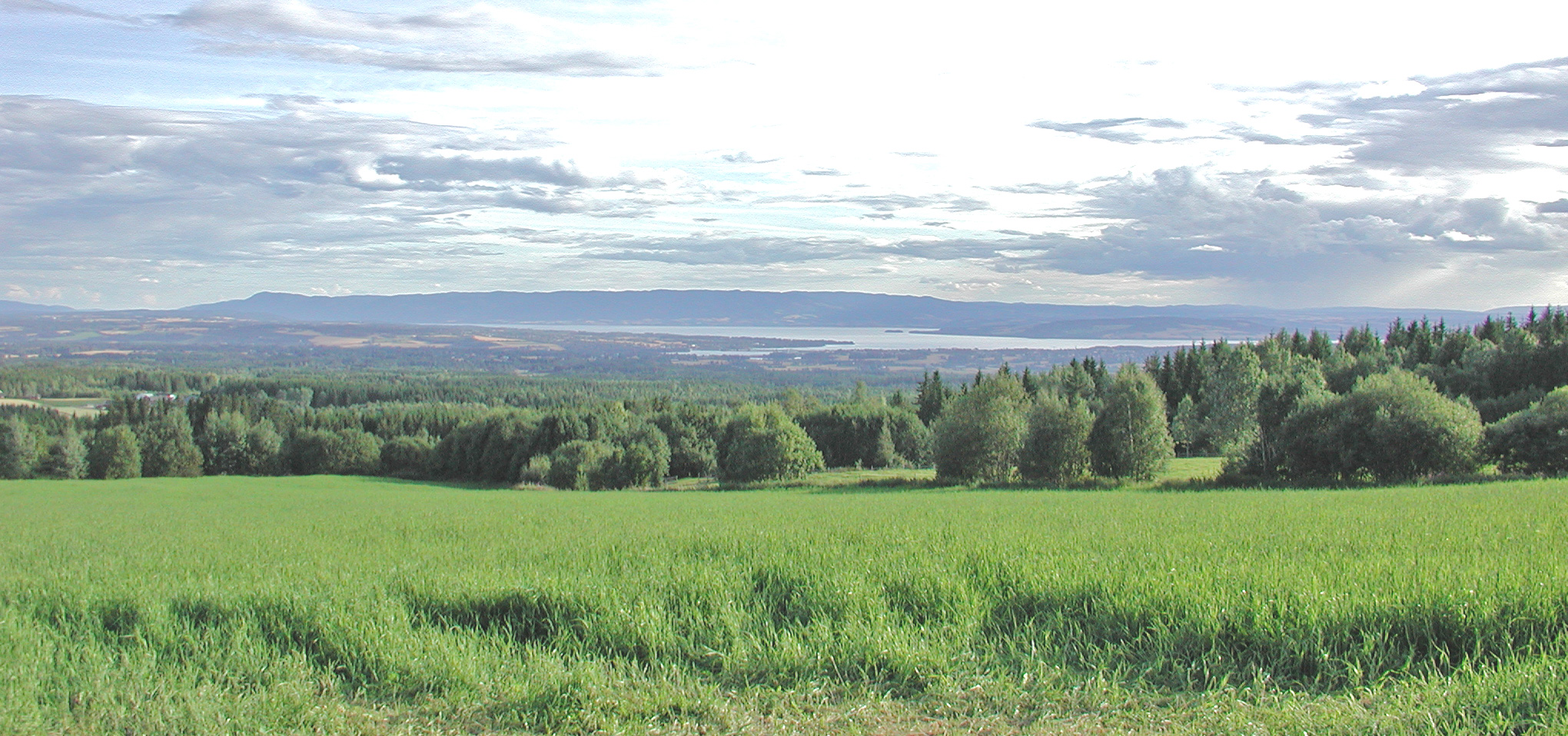
- View of parts of Hedmarken from Vang, near Hamar.
- Interactive map of Hedmarken
- Coordinates: 60°48′04″N 11°16′50″E
- Country: Norway
- County: Innlandet
- Region: Austlandet
- Urban centre: Hamar

Area
  - Total: 2,725 km^{2} (1,052 sq mi)

Population (2015)
  - Total: 91,015
  - Density: 33.40/km^{2} (86.51/sq mi)
- Demonym(s): Hemarking; Heimarking; Hedmarking

Hedmarken (Urban East Norwegian: [ˈhêːdmɑrkn̩], locally [ˈhɛ̂mɑrkɑ]; known as Hedemarken [ˈhêːdəmɑrkn̩] until 2003) is a traditional district in Innlandet county in Eastern Norway.

Hedmarken consists of the municipalities Stange, Hamar, Løten, and Ringsaker. In the past, it also contained the former municipalities of Romedal, Vang, Furnes, and Nes, but those municipalities were merged into Hamar, Stange, and Ringsaker during the 20th century. Traditionally, it also included Gjøvik Municipality on the other side of the lake, but this is no longer the case. The old county of Hedmark was named after the district of Hedmarken, but the county included several other districts as well, namely Østerdalen and Glåmdalen (Solør, Odalen and Vinger).

The district is dominated by rolling agricultural terrain, hilly green mountains, and pine forests.

== Etymology ==
The Old Norse form of the name was Heiðmǫrk. The first element is heiðnir, the name of an old Germanic tribe and is related to the word heið which means "moorland". The last element is mǫrk which means "woodland", "borderland", or "march". "In Hedmarken" is translated på Hedmarken which literally means "on Hedmarken".

== History ==
In the early Viking Age, before Harald Fairhair, Hedmarken was a petty kingdom, part of the Eidsivating. Kings of Hedmarken included:

- Halfdan Hvitbeinn
- Sigtryg Eysteinsson
- Eystein Eysteinsson, brother of Sigtryg
- Halfdan the Black, King Harald's father, was king of half of Hedmark after defeating rulers Sigtryg and his brother, Eystein.
