= Loten =

Loten, Løten, or Löten may refer to:

== People ==
- Tom Loten (born 1999), an English cricketer
- Loten Namling, an Indian-born singer, musician artist, entertainer and cartoonist living in Switzerland
- Joan Gideon Loten (1710-1789), a Dutch civil servant in the colonies of the Dutch East India Company

== Places ==
- Løten Municipality, a municipality in Innlandet county, Norway
- Løten (village), a village in Løten Municipality in Innlandet county, Norway
- Løten Church, a church in Løten Municipality in Innlandet county, Norway
- Løten Station, a railway station in the village of Løten in Løten Municipality in Innlandet county, Norway
- Löten Church, a church located at Heidenstam Square, in Uppsala, Sweden

== Other ==
- Loten, the trade name for Atenolol
- Løten FK, a football club in the municipality of Løten in Innlandet county, Norway
- Loten's sunbird, a sunbird endemic to India and Sri Lanka
