= Svartelva =

River in Innlandet, Norway

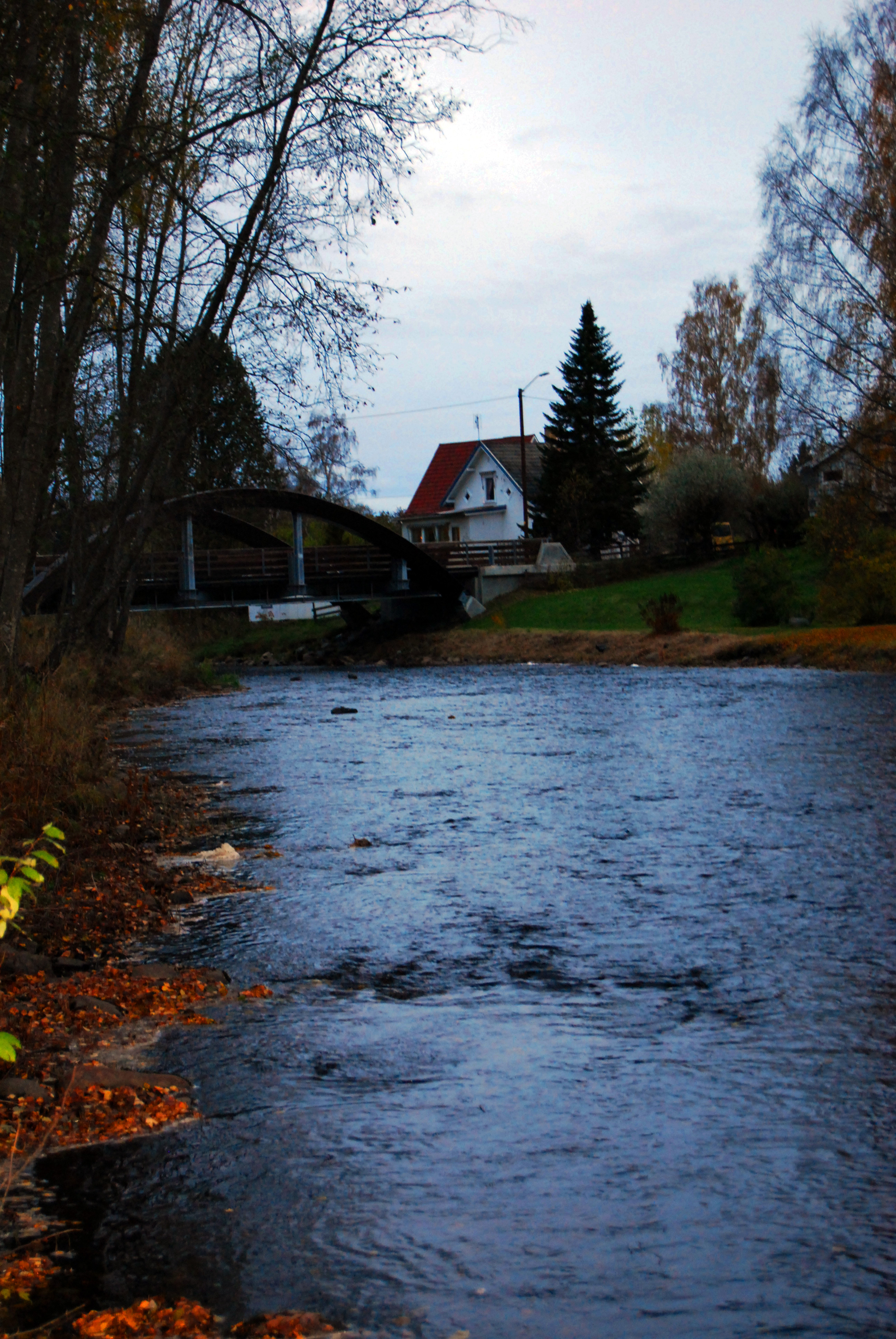
- View of the river near Ilseng

Location
- Country: Norway
- County: Innlandet
- Municipalities: Hamar, Løten, Stange

Physical characteristics
- Source: Gjetholmsjøen lake
  - location: Stange/Løten, Norway
  - coordinates: 60.72227°N 11.46227°E
  - elevation: 314.6 metres (1,032 ft)
- Mouth: Mjøsa lake
  - location: Stange/Hamar, Norway
  - coordinates: 60.7943°N 11.1218°E
  - elevation: 123 metres (404 ft)
- Length: 70.5 km (43.8 mi)
- Basin size: 481.9 km^{2} (186.1 sq mi)
- Width
  - average: 18–26 m (59–85 ft)
- Discharge
  - average: 3.94 m^{3}/s (139 cu ft/s)

Svartelva (English: The Black River) is a river in Innlandet county, Norway. The 70.5-kilometre (43.8 mi) long river flows from the lake Gjetholsmjøen on the border of Løten Municipality and Stange Municipality at Byenga and it heads to the northwest. The river passes very close to the lake Rokosjøen in Løten Municipality before turning westerly towards Ådalsbruk. At the village of Ilseng, it is joined by a tributary, the river Lageråa. From the point where the Lageråa joins, the river forms the border between Stange Municipality and Hamar Municipality, continuing until the outlet at Åkersvika into the large lake Mjøsa. The river is about 18–26 metres (59–85 ft) wide, but it is fairly shallow.

== See also ==
- List of rivers in Norway
