= Lageråa =

River in Innlandet, Norway

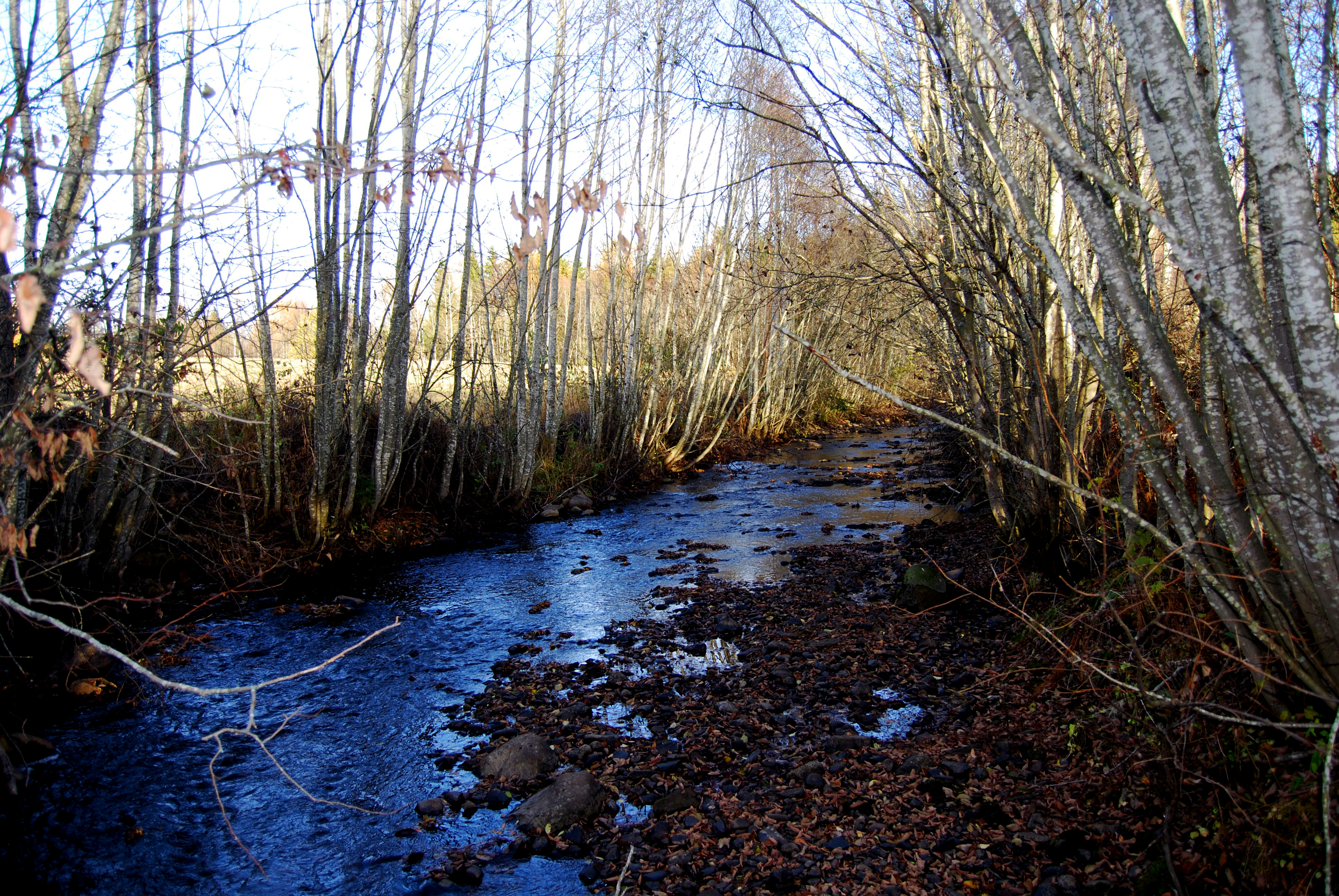
- View of the Lageråa near Ilseng

Location
- Country: Norway
- County: Innlandet
- Municipalities: Stange, Hamar, and Løten

Physical characteristics
- Source: Langgjesna marsh
  - location: Hamar, Norway
  - coordinates: 60.930318°N 11.177329°E
  - elevation: 665.6 metres (2,184 ft)
- Mouth: Svartelva
  - location: Ilseng, Norway
  - coordinates: 60.7733°N 11.218°E
  - elevation: 141 metres (463 ft)
- Length: 22.6 km (14.0 mi)
- Basin size: 31.38 km^{2} (12.12 sq mi)
- Discharge
  - average: 0.28 m^{3}/s (9.9 cu ft/s)

Lageråa is a small river in Innlandet county, Norway. The 22.6-kilometre (14.0 mi) long river flows from the Langgjesna marsh area in the Vang commons in Hamar Municipality southwards. For a time, the river forms the border between Hamar Municipality and Løten Municipality. When the river reaches the village of Ilseng in Stange Municipality, it discharges into the larger river Svartelva.

== See also ==
- List of rivers in Norway
