= Ådalsbruk Station =

Railway station in Løten, Norway

Ådalsbruk
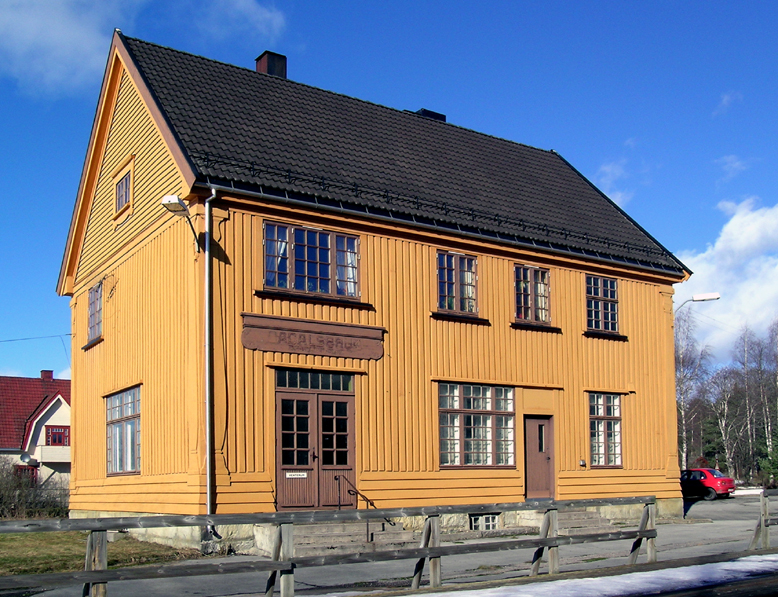

General information
- Location: Ådalsbruk, Løten Municipality; Norway
- Coordinates: 60°47′50″N 11°18′24″E
- Operator: Norwegian State Railways
- Line: Røros Line

History
- Opened: 1862
- Closed: 1972
Location

Ådalsbruk Station (Norwegian: Ådalsbruk stasjon) was a train station on the Røros Line in Norway from 1862 to 1972. It was located in the village of Ådalsbruk in Løten Municipality, Innlandet county.

It was opened in 1862 as Løken, renamed Aadalsbrug in 1881 to correspond with the nearby village. Both were named after the iron works Aadals Brug Jernstøberi og Mek. Værksted. The spelling was modernized to Ådalsbruk in 1921.

From 1972 the station was no longer staffed.

Preceding station		Following station
Hørsand	Røros Line	Løten
