= Heimdal, Innlandet =

Village in Innlandet, Norway

Jønsrud Heimdal
- Village
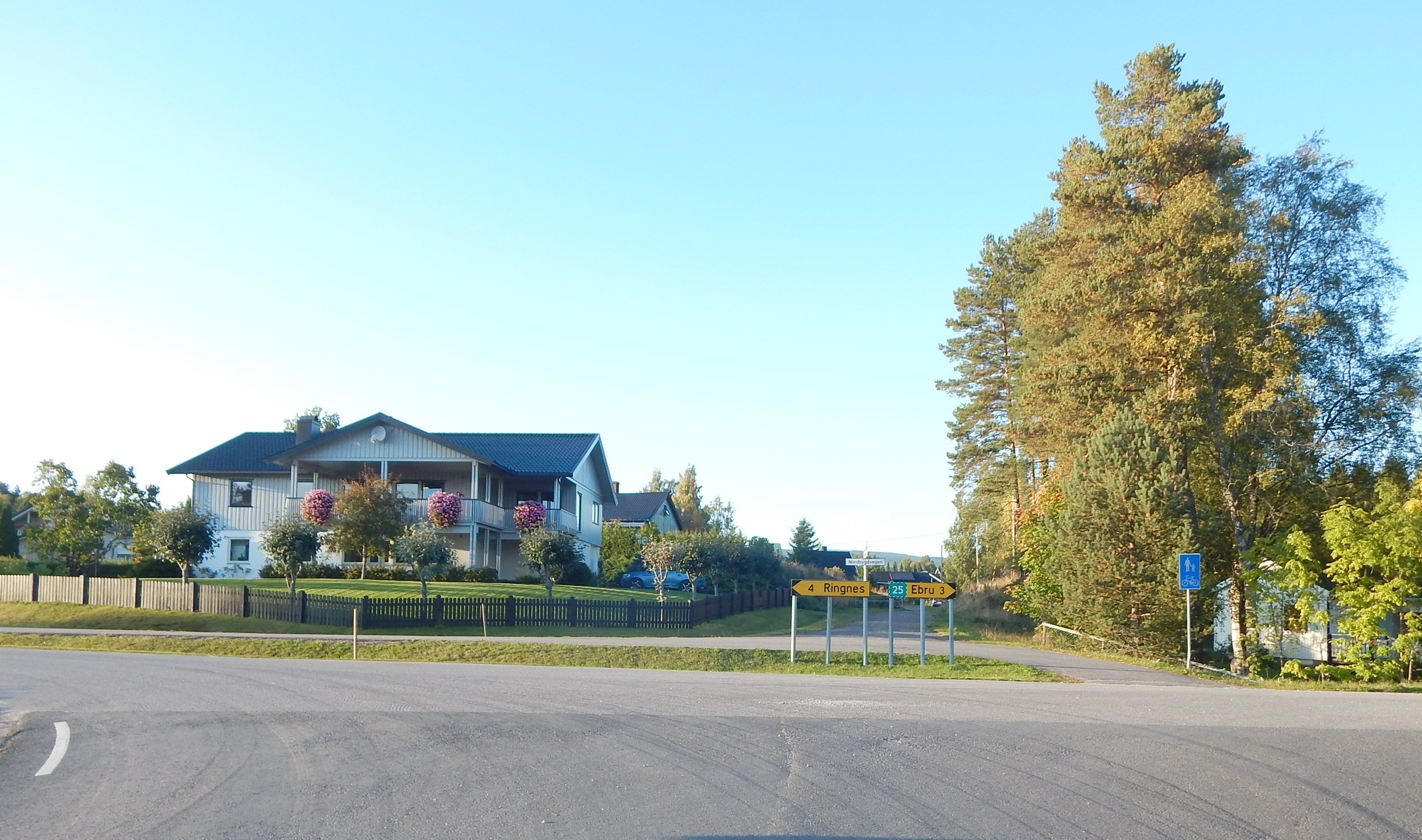
- View of the village
- Interactive map of Jønsrud; Heimdal
- Location within Innlandet Location within Norway
- Coordinates: 60.87011°N 11.37237°E
- Country: Norway
- Region: Eastern Norway
- County: Innlandet
- District: Hedmarken
- Municipality: Løten Municipality

Area
  - Total: 0.68 km^{2} (0.26 sq mi)
- Elevation: 291 m (955 ft)

Population (2012)
  - Total: 287
  - Density: 420/km^{2} (1,100/sq mi)
- Time zone: UTC+01:00 (CET)
  - Summer (DST): UTC+02:00 (CEST)
- Post Code: 2340 Løten

Heimdal or Jønsrud is a village in Løten Municipality in Innlandet county, Norway. The village is located about 5 kilometres (3.1 mi) northeast of the village of Løten and the village of Brenneriroa and about 130 kilometres (81 mi) from Oslo.

The 0.68-square-kilometre (170-acre) village had a population (2012) of 287 and a population density of 422 inhabitants per square kilometre (1,090/sq mi). Since 2012, the population and area data for this village area has not been separately tracked by Statistics Norway.
