= Oppegård Chapel =

Church in Innlandet, Norway

- Oppegård kapell
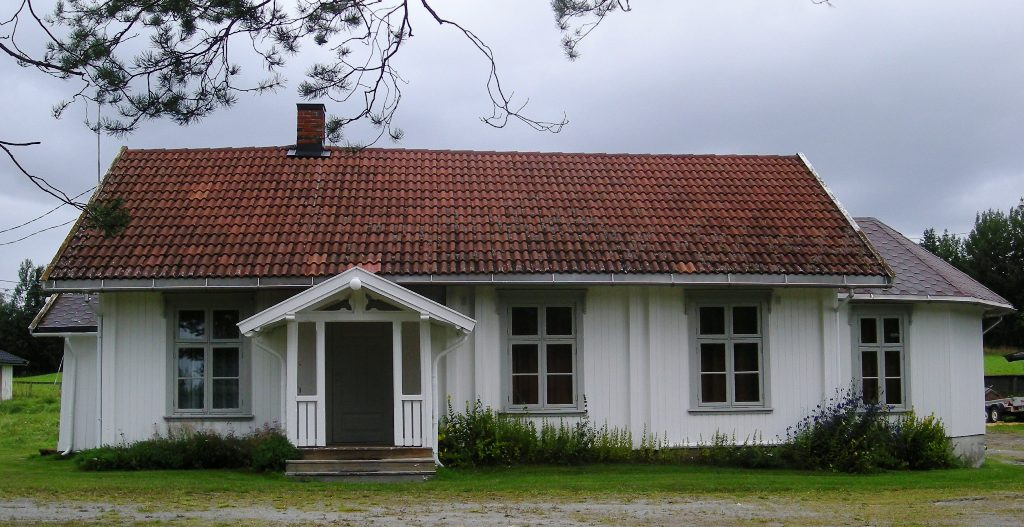
- View of the chapel Credit: Jan-Tore Egge
- Oppegård Chapel
- 60°44′21″N 11°29′46″E
- Location: Løten Municipality, Innlandet
- Country: Norway
- Denomination: Church of Norway
- Churchmanship: Evangelical Lutheran

History
- Status: Chapel
- Founded: 1886
- Consecrated: 1886

Architecture
- Functional status: Active
- Architectural type: Long church
- Completed: 1886 (140 years ago)

Specifications
- Capacity: 70
- Materials: Wood

Administration
- Diocese: Hamar bispedømme
- Deanery: Hamar domprosti
- Parish: Løten
- Norwegian Cultural Heritage Site
- Type: Church
- Status: Not protected
- ID: 85225

Oppegård Chapel (Norwegian: Oppegård kapell) is a chapel of the Church of Norway in Løten Municipality in Innlandet county, Norway. It is located in the village of Oppegård. It is one of the annex chapels for the Løten parish which is part of the Hamar domprosti (deanery) in the Diocese of Hamar. The white, wooden chapel was built in a long church design in 1886. The chapel seats about 70 people.

== History ==
Oppegård chapel is located deep in the forest in southern Løten municipality, a little southeast of the large lake Rokosjøen. It is a single-storey wooden house with a choir. The building was consecrated for church use in 1886. The chapel was also used as a schoolhouse from 1886 until 1919. A divider was used to close off the choir when the rest of the building was used for school or other non-church purposes. The building was restored in 1986.

== See also ==
- List of churches in Hamar
