= Kristoffer Nilsen Svartbækken Grindalen =

Norwegian criminal (1804–1876)

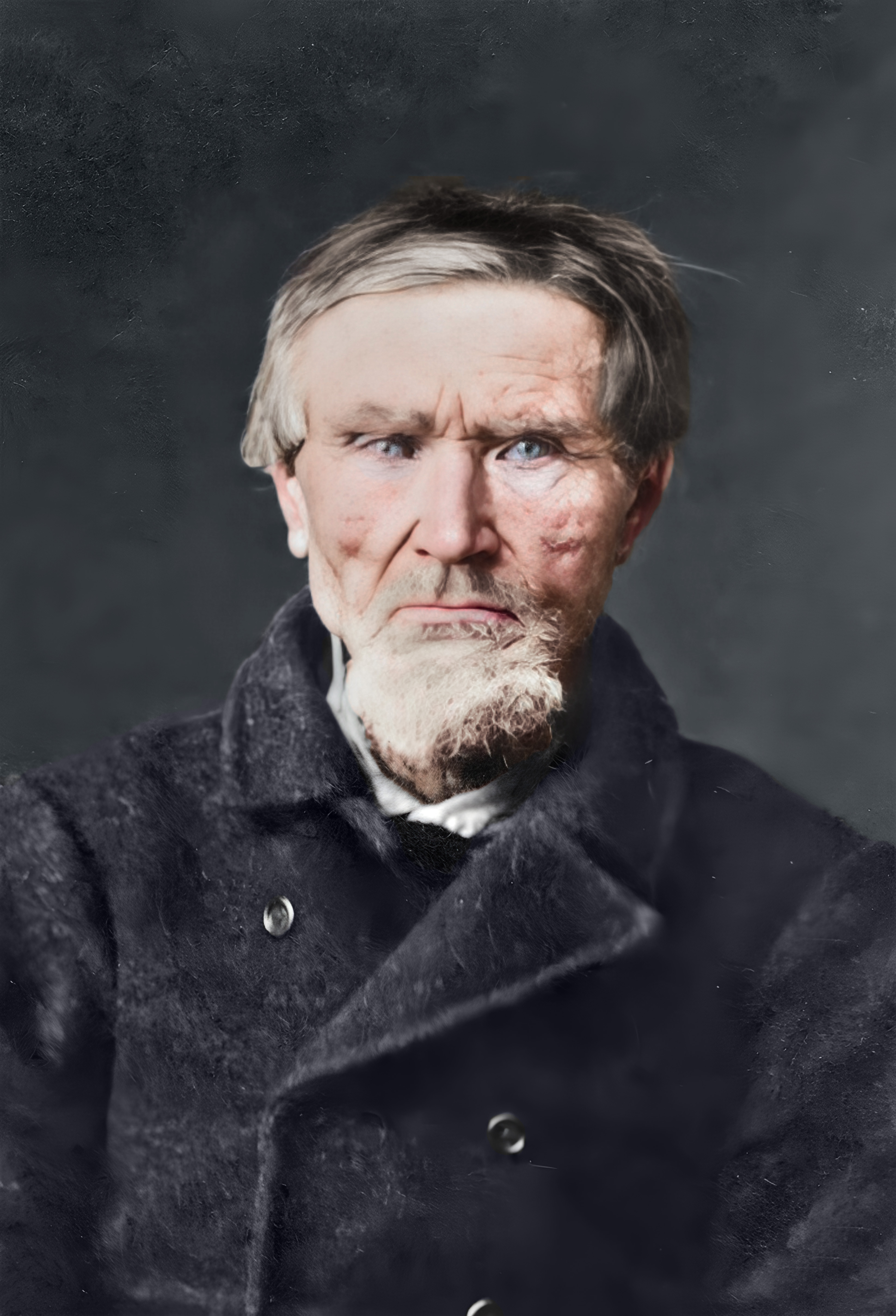
- Svartbækken in 1875 (original grayscale)
- Born: 9 September 1804; Elverum, Norway
- Died: 25 February 1876 (aged 71); Løten, Norway
- Cause of death: Execution by beheading
- Resting place: Løten Church
- Occupations: Travelling merchant and career criminal

Kristoffer Nilsen Svartbækken Grindalen (9 September 1804 – 25 February 1876) was a Norwegian criminal, killer and thief.

== Biography ==
Grindalen was born on 9 September 1804 at the crofter's farm Nordre Svartbækken in what is now Elverum Municipality. He spent 41 years of his life in prisons. He was convicted for a murder and robbery near Ekrumstormyra in Løten Municipality in 1875, and was beheaded by axe at the site of the murder in 1876, witnessed by 2,500 spectators, in the last public and civil execution in Norway. Moments before his beheading he confessed to the murder.

Henrik Sørensen's painting Svartbækken from 1908, inspired by the incident, was much discussed, but is regarded as Sørensen's breakthrough.
