= Løten FK =

Norwegian football club

- Full name: Løten Fotballklubb
- Founded: 1964
- Ground: Løten kunstgress, Løten
- League: 4. divisjon
- 2019: 2nd

Løten Fotballklubb is a Norwegian association football club from Løten in Løten Municipality, Innlandet county. The club was founded in 23 November 1964.

The men's football team plays in the 4. divisjon, the fifth tier of Norwegian football. It had stints in the 3. divisjon as late as 2006–2010 and a single season in 2018.
