= Hedmarksvidda =

Moorland in Innlandet, Norway

- Plateau
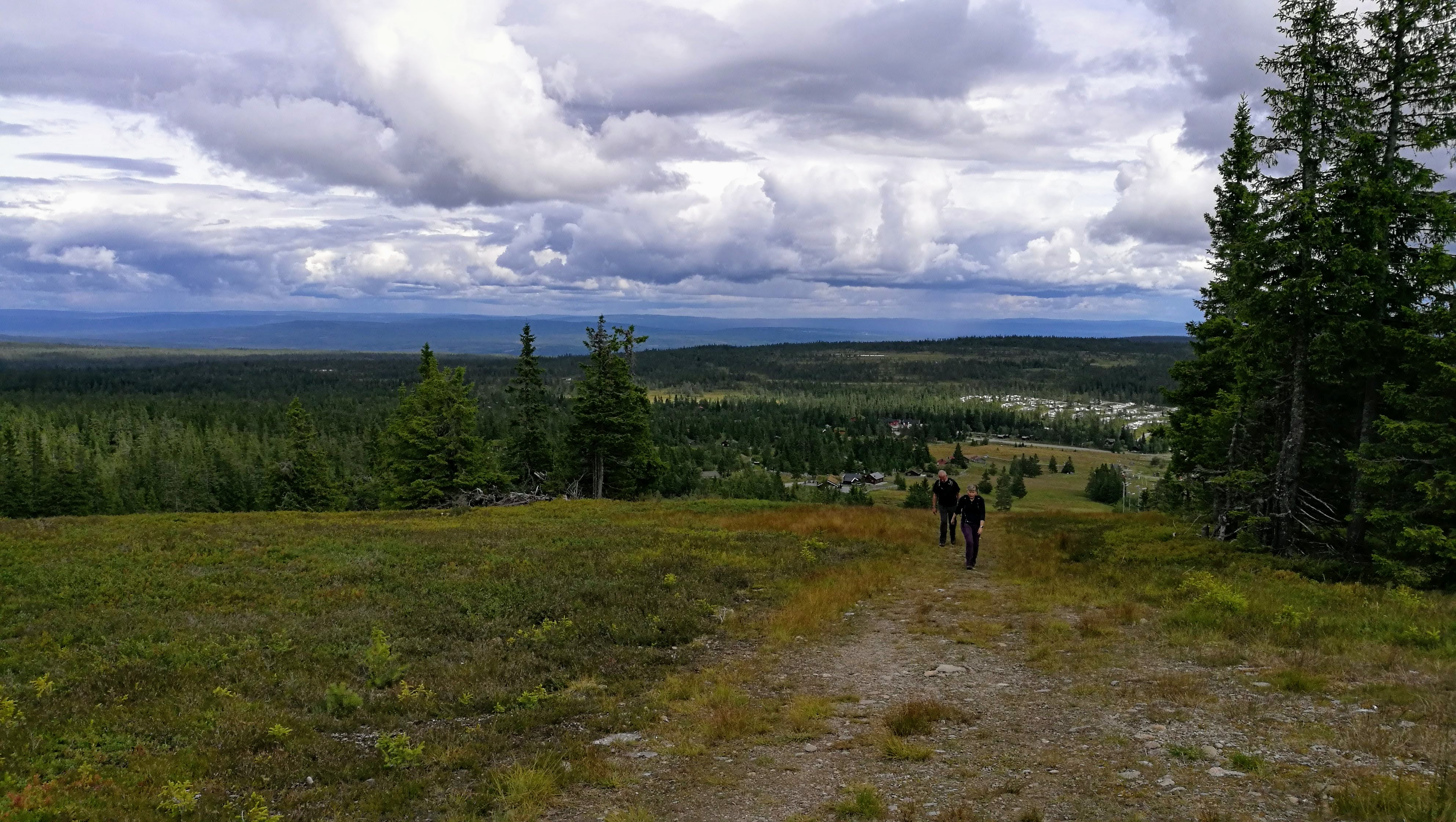
- View of the Hedmarksvidda plateau
- Interactive map of the peninsula
- Coordinates: 61.2317°N 11.0958°E
- Location: Innlandet, Norway

Ramsar Wetland
- Official name: Hedmarksvidda Wetland System
- Designated: 12 November 2010
- Reference no.: 1951

Hedmarksvidda (English: The Hedmark moorland) is a forest and low mountain moorland plateau area in Innlandet county, Norway. The area is generally described as including the areas between the Østerdal valley in the east, the Gudbrandsdal valley in the west, Løten in the south, and Sjusjøen in the north. Hedmarksvidda is adjacent to the Rondane area to the north, although it doesn't border Rondane National Park.

The area is not distinctly defined, but is normally considered to be located within the limits of the municipalities Løten, Hamar, and Ringsaker and sometimes it also includes parts of Elverum and Åmot as well. There are several lodges and sporting grounds in the southern part of the area including Gåsbu, Budor, and Målia.

The area is generally at an elevation of 600–1,000 metres (2,000–3,300 ft) above sea level. This area is often used for recreation and tourism. The Birkebeinerrennet runs over the Hedmarksvidda.
