= Hamar Prison =

Prison in Innlandet, Norway

Coordinates: 60.7960°N 11.0644°E

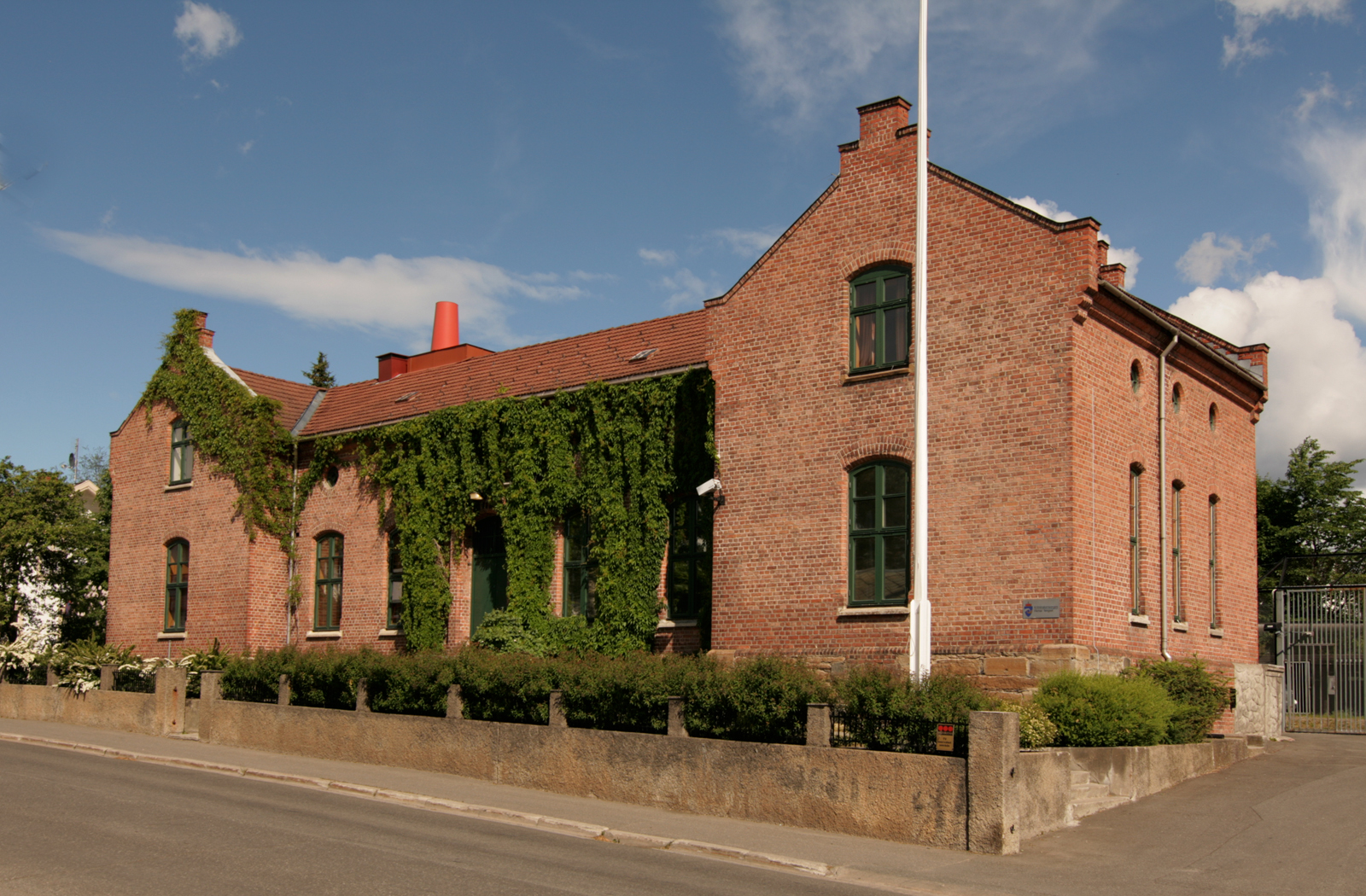
Hamar Prison

Hamar Prison (Norwegian: Hamar fengsel) is a correctional facility located in Hamar Municipality in Innlandet County, under the Northeast Region of the Norwegian Correctional Service.

== History ==
The prison is situated on Grønnegata and was constructed in 1864 based on designs by Heinrich Schirmer and Wilhelm von Hanno. The construction was overseen by local master builder Herman Frang and is built symmetrically and simply using unplastered red brick from Tokstad in Stange, giving it a Neo-Gothic appearance.

Today, Hamar Prison has a total capacity of 31 inmates. The larger Ilseng Prison outside of Hamar also serves the region.

== Notable inmates ==
- Marius Borg Høiby
