= Bente Elin Lilleøkseth =

Norwegian politician (born 1974)

Bente Elin Lilleøkseth (born 25 September 1974) is a Norwegian politician for the Labour Party.

She served as a deputy representative to the Norwegian Parliament from Hedmark during the term 2001–2005.

On the local level, Lilleøkseth is the mayor of Løten Municipality since 2007. She was first elected to the municipal council for Løten Municipality in 1999.
