= Oset Chapel =

Church in Innlandet, Norway

- Oset kapell
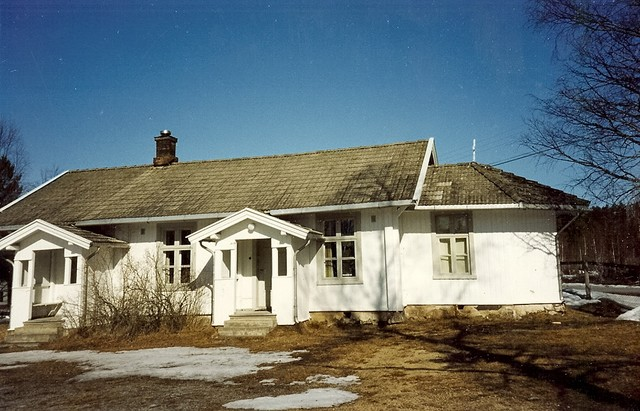
- View of the chapel Credit: www.kirkenorge.no
- Oset Chapel
- 60°47′22″N 11°28′39″E
- Location: Løten Municipality, Innlandet
- Country: Norway
- Denomination: Church of Norway
- Churchmanship: Evangelical Lutheran

History
- Status: Chapel
- Founded: 1885
- Consecrated: 1885

Architecture
- Functional status: Active
- Architectural type: Long church
- Completed: 1885 (141 years ago)

Specifications
- Capacity: 70
- Materials: Wood

Administration
- Diocese: Hamar bispedømme
- Deanery: Hamar domprosti
- Parish: Løten
- Norwegian Cultural Heritage Site
- Type: Church
- Status: Protected
- ID: 85249

Oset Chapel (Norwegian: Oset kapell) is a chapel of the Church of Norway in Løten Municipality in Innlandet county, Norway. It is located in the village of Oset. It is one of the annex chapels for the Løten parish which is part of the Hamar domprosti (deanery) in the Diocese of Hamar. The white, wooden chapel was built in a long church design in 1885 using plans drawn up by an unknown architect. The chapel seats about 70 people.

== History ==
A small wooden single-storey house that was moved here in 1875 and used as a school. In 1885, a choir was added onto the building according to drawings by a man named Søborg. Afterwards, the building was consecrated as a chapel. The building continued to be used as both a school and a chapel until 1918 when the school was closed. During this time, the choir was closed off from the rest of the building for school and other non-church activities. The chapel is located near the northern shore of the lake Rokosjøen and there is a camping facility bordering the chapel on three sides of its property. A few kilometers further south is the old Rokoberget Church ruins. The medieval church was closed long before the new chapel was opened at this location.

== See also ==
- List of churches in Hamar
