= Rokosjøen =

Lake in Innlandet, Norway

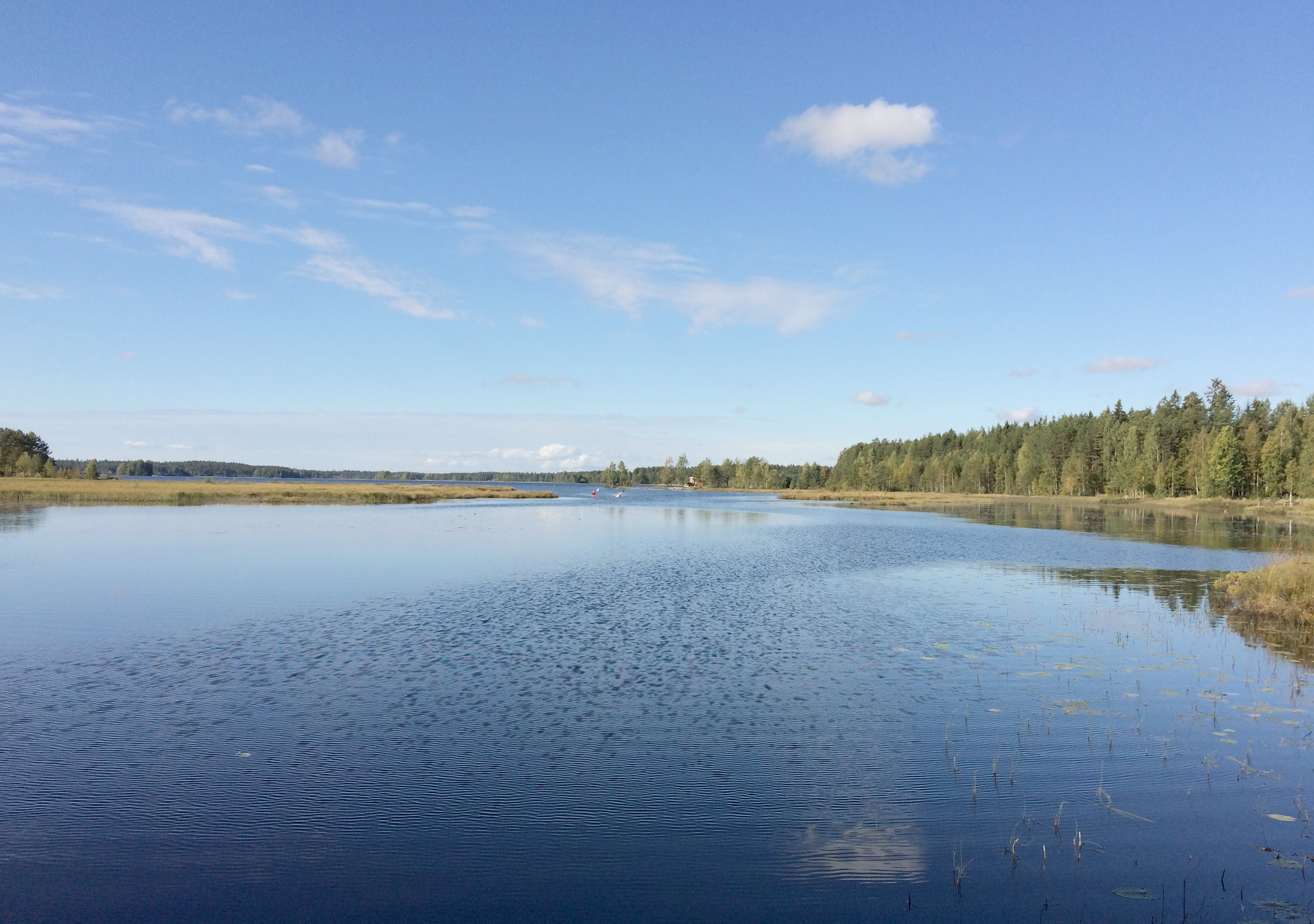
- Interactive map of the lake
- Location: Løten, Innlandet
- Coordinates: 60°47′24″N 11°26′38″E
- Basin countries: Norway
- Max. length: 5.2 kilometres (3.2 mi)
- Max. width: 2 kilometres (1.2 mi)
- Surface area: 4.03 km^{2} (1.56 sq mi)
- Shore length^{1}: 28.88 kilometres (17.95 mi)
- Surface elevation: 215 metres (705 ft)
- References: NVE
- ^{1} Shore length is not a well-defined measure.

Rokosjøen is a lake in Løten Municipality in Innlandet county, Norway. The 4-square-kilometre (1.5 sq mi) lake lies about 5 kilometres (3.1 mi) southeast of the village of Løten. There is a camping facility on the east end of the lake. Oset Chapel is located beside the campground facility.

== Church ruins ==
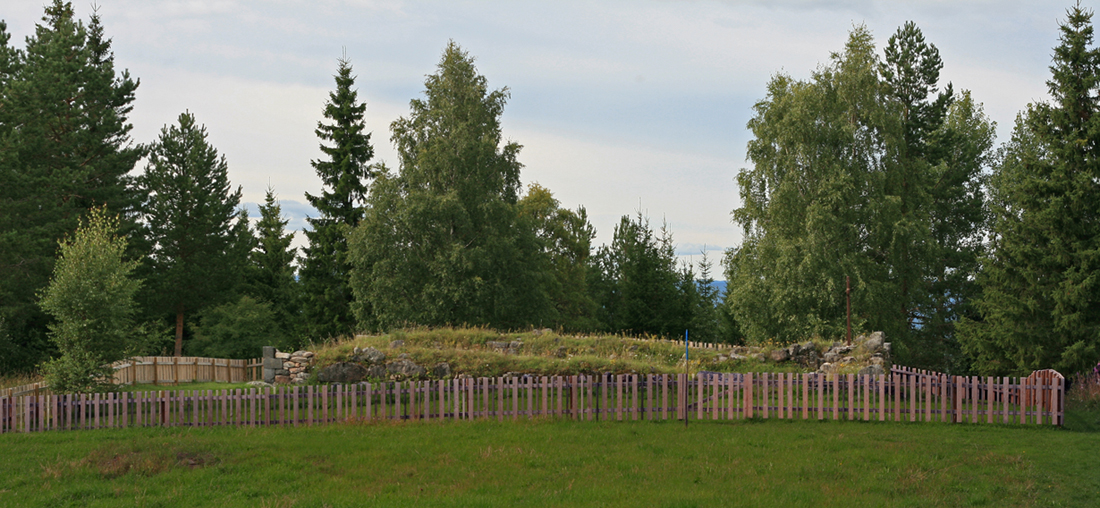
Ruins of Rokoberget church

The Rokoberget church ruins (Rokoberget kirkeruin) stand on a ridge south of the lake Rokosjøen. Rokoberget Church was dedicated to Saint Michael and mentioned in a papal letter from 1254. It is believed that the church was not used after the Protestant Reformation. The ruin was excavated in 1906–1907. The ruin is fenced with an information board outside the fence.

== See also ==
- List of lakes in Norway
