= Elverum Station =

Railway station in Elverum, Norway

Elverum
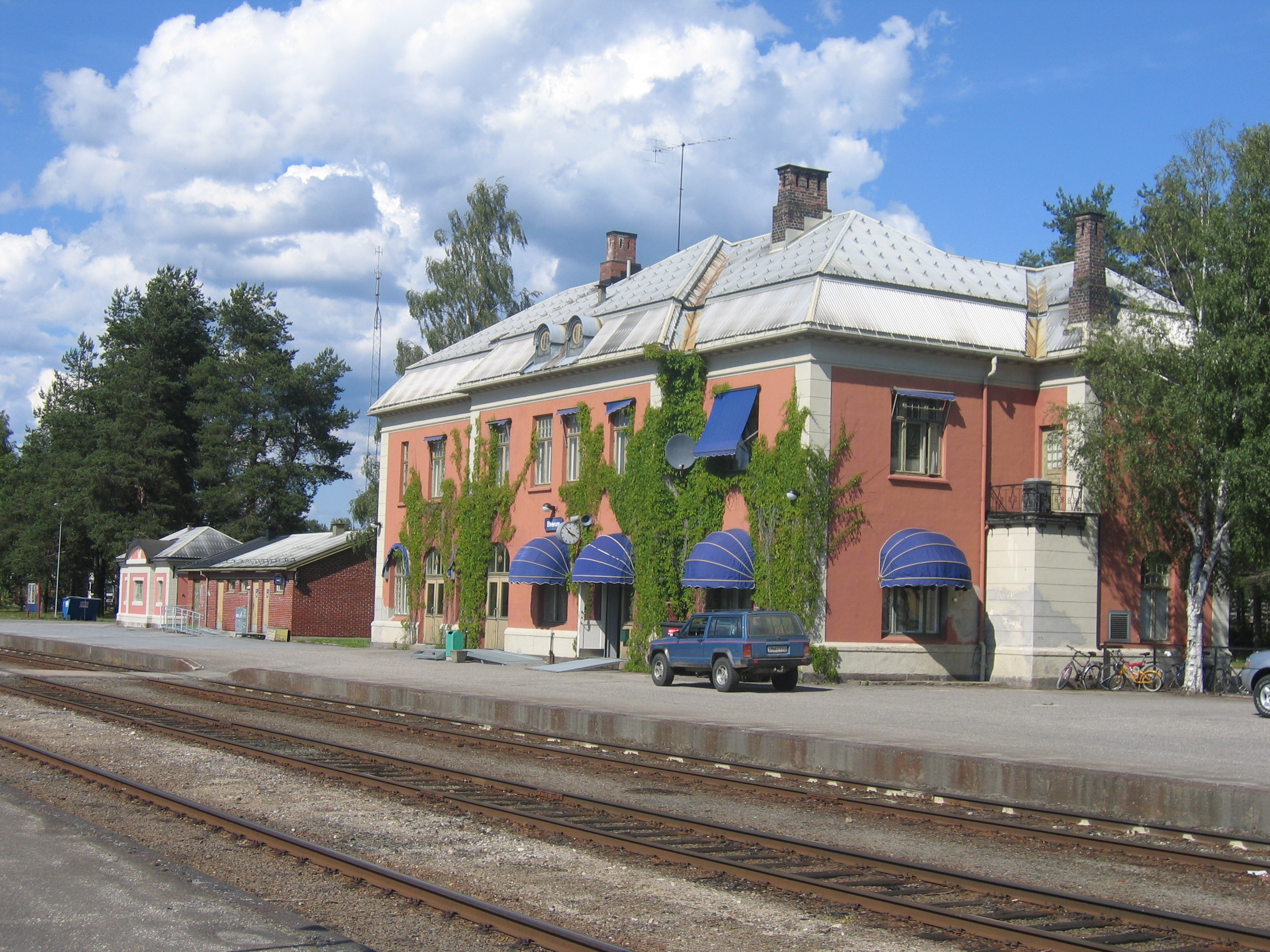

General information
- Location: Elverum, Norway
- Coordinates: 60°52′57.15″N 11°32′48.34″E
- Elevation: 187.8 metres (616 ft) AMSL
- Owner: Bane NOR
- Operator: SJ Norge
- Lines: Røros Line; Solør Line
- Distance: 158.38 km (98.41 mi)
- Platforms: 2

Construction
- Architect: Paul Armin Due

History
- Opened: 1862
Location

Elverum Station is a railway station located at Vestad, on the west side of Glomma in the town of Elverum which is located in Elverum Municipality in Innlandet county, Norway. The station is on the Røros Line, in addition to being the terminus of the Solør Line.

== History ==
It was opened in 1862 as part of the Hamar–Grundset Line. The current station building was drawn by Paul Armin Due and constructed as part of the Solør Line in 1913. The station is no longer staffed.

The restaurant was taken over by Norsk Spisevognselskap on 24 November 1921. They retained operation until 8 May 1931, when it was transferred back to private operation.

Preceding station			Following station
Løten	Røros Line		Rustad
Kongsvinger	Solør Line		Terminus
Preceding station	Regional trains		Following station
Løten	R60	Hamar–Røros	Rustad
