= Brenneriroa =

Village in Innlandet, Norway

Brenneriroa Løiten brænderi / Slettmoen
- Village
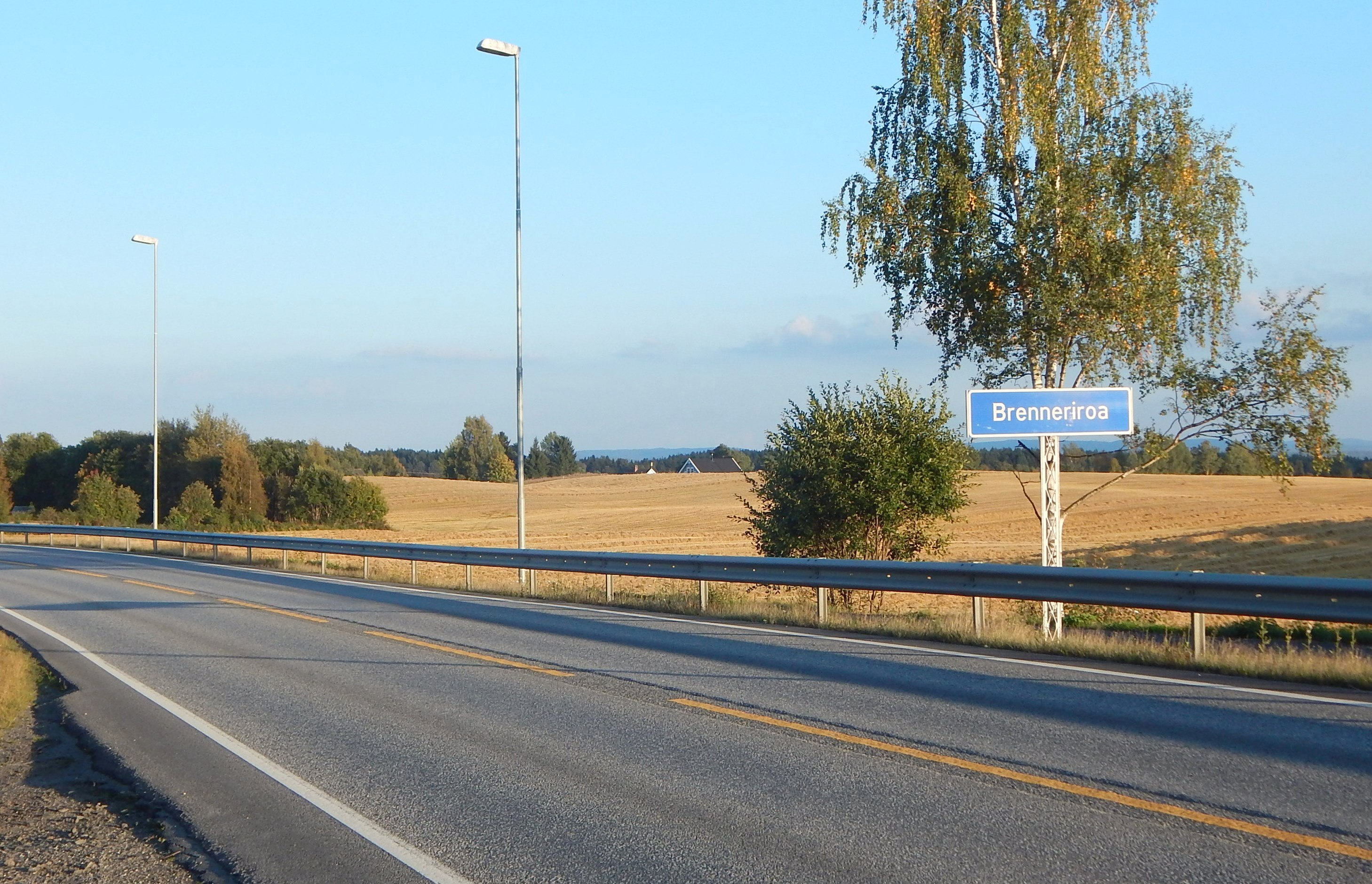
- View of the sign on the road entering the village
- Interactive map of Brenneriroa
- Location within Innlandet Location within Norway
- Coordinates: 60.82752°N 11.3033°E
- Country: Norway
- Region: Eastern Norway
- County: Innlandet
- District: Hedmarken
- Municipality: Løten Municipality

Area
  - Total: 0.78 km^{2} (0.30 sq mi)
- Elevation: 232 m (761 ft)

Population (2024)
  - Total: 924
  - Density: 1,185/km^{2} (3,070/sq mi)
- Time zone: UTC+01:00 (CET)
  - Summer (DST): UTC+02:00 (CEST)
- Post Code: 2340 Løten

Brenneriroa or Løiten brænderi is a village in Løten Municipality in Innlandet county, Norway. It is located along the river Fura, about 2 kilometres (1.2 mi) northwest of the village of Løten. The historic Løten Church lies about half-way between the two villages.

The 0.78-square-kilometre (190-acre) village has a population (2024) of 924 and a population density of 1,185 inhabitants per square kilometre (3,070/sq mi).

== Name ==
The village was historically known as Løiten brænderi after the well-known distillery that once was located in the western part of the village. Statistics Norway still uses that name for the village, but the official name according to the Norwegian Mapping Authority is Brenneriroa. The eastern part of the village is also known as Slettmoen.
