= Ådalsbruk =

Village in Innlandet, Norway

Ådalsbruk Aadalsbruk (historic)
- Village
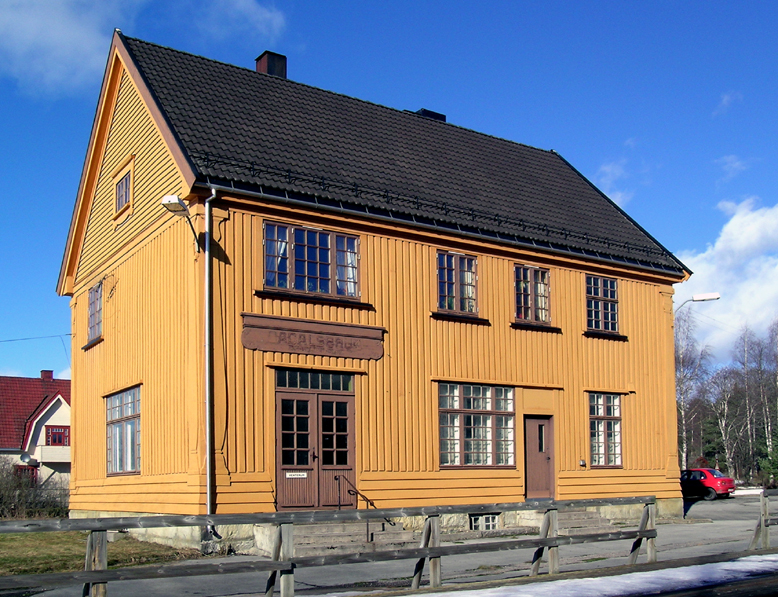
- View of the Ådalsbruk Station
- Interactive map of Ådalsbruk
- Location within Innlandet Location within Norway
- Coordinates: 60.79653°N 11.30883°E
- Country: Norway
- Region: Eastern Norway
- County: Innlandet
- District: Hedmarken
- Municipality: Løten Municipality

Area
  - Total: 0.82 km^{2} (0.32 sq mi)
- Elevation: 191 m (627 ft)

Population (2024)
  - Total: 852
  - Density: 1,039/km^{2} (2,690/sq mi)
- Time zone: UTC+01:00 (CET)
  - Summer (DST): UTC+02:00 (CEST)
- Post Code: 2345 Ådalsbruk

Ådalsbruk is a village in Løten Municipality in Innlandet county, Norway. The village is located along the river Svartelva, just east of the Norwegian National Road 3. The village of Løten lies about 4 kilometres (2.5 mi) north of Ådalsbruk, and the village of Romedal lies about 6 kilometres (3.7 mi) to the south.

The 0.82-square-kilometre (200-acre) village has a population (2024) of 852 and a population density of 1,039 inhabitants per square kilometre (2,690/sq mi).

== History ==
Ådalsbruk is an old industrial site. The village name was taken from the iron works Aadals Brug Jernstøberi og Mek. Værksted, which existed from 1842 to 1928. The paper mill Klevfos Cellulose- og Papirfabrik existed from 1888 to 1976,and is now a museum.

The village formerly had its own railway station, Ådalsbruk Station, which was a stop along the Røros Line.

== Notable people ==
- Edvard Munch (born 1863 in Ådalsbruk), the well-known Norwegian painter
