= Löten Church =

Coordinates: 59°52′42″N 17°38′48″E

- Lötenkyrkan
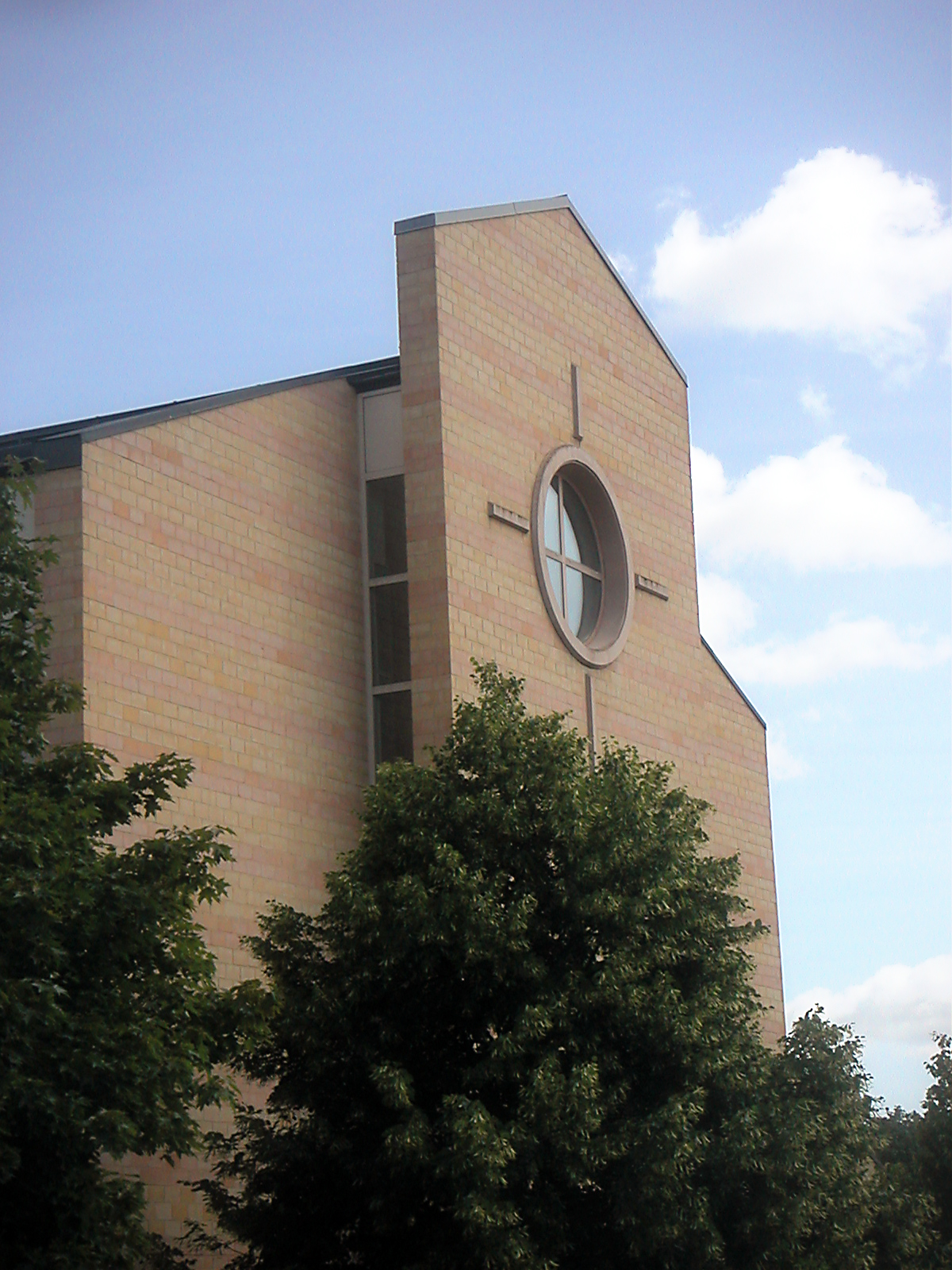
- Löten Church
- Löten Church
- Location: Uppsala
- Country: Sweden
- Denomination: Church of Sweden

History
- Consecrated: 1970

Administration
- Diocese: Uppsala
- Parish: Old Uppsala

The Löten Church (Swedish: Lötenkyrkan) is a Lutheran church located at Heidenstam Square, in Uppsala, Sweden, and is a district church of Gamla Uppsala Parish. Lötenkyrkan is one of forty partner churches that exist between the Church of Sweden and the Swedish Evangelical Mission. Christoffer Abrahamsson and Heiner Helm serve as the pastors of the Church.

== Mission of the Löten Church ==
The Löten Church has a mission to reach Ethiopia, serving in the hospital in Aira in western Ethiopia. Two workers from the church work as a doctor (orthopedist) and a nurse, concentrating primarily on diabetic patients.

There are others who are involved in the teaching field, like teaching Theology at EGST (Ethiopian Graduate School of Theology), English at Mekane Yesus Church Training Centre in Addis Ababa etc.

== Cross Culture ==
The church has a Fresh Expressions community with an international focus called "Cross Culture" led by Rev. Edward L. Thomas. Cross Culture has drawn special attention from youth, international students from Uppsala University, immigrants, and multicultural families in Uppsala since September 2009.

This community meets every Sunday for worship, with preaching, Sunday School, prayer and fellowship.
