= Ilseng Prison =

Prison in Ilseng, Norway

Coordinates: 60°46′45″N 11°13′42″E

Ilseng Prison (Norwegian: Ilseng fengsel) is a prison in Ilseng, Innlandet county, Norway.
