= Ilseng =

Village in Stange Municipality, Norway

- Village
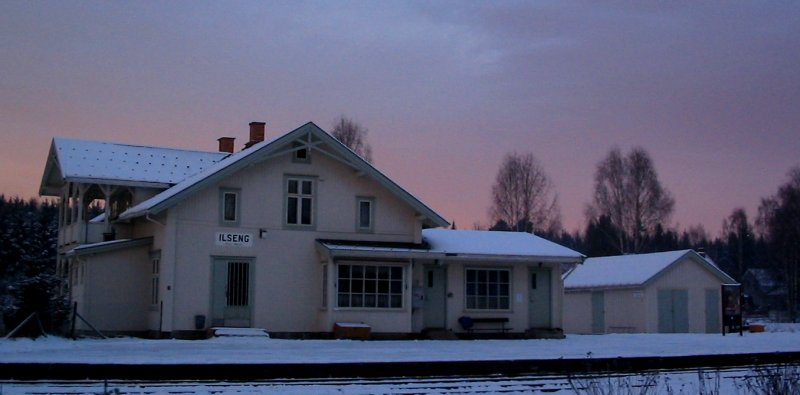
- View of the Ilseng railway station (no longer used)
- Interactive map of Ilseng
- Location within Innlandet Location within Norway
- Coordinates: 60.7757°N 11.22725°E
- Country: Norway
- Region: Eastern Norway
- County: Innlandet
- District: Hedmarken
- Municipality: Stange (and Hamar)

Area
  - Total: 1.06 km^{2} (0.41 sq mi)
- Elevation: 159 m (522 ft)

Population (2024)
  - Total: 977
  - Density: 922/km^{2} (2,390/sq mi)
- Time zone: UTC+01:00 (CET)
  - Summer (DST): UTC+02:00 (CEST)
- Post Code: 2344 Ilseng

Ilseng is a village in Innlandet county, Norway. The village is located mostly in Stange Municipality, however, the northwestern part of the village extends just across the border into Hamar Municipality. The Rørosbanen railway line passes through the village, stopping at the Ilseng Station which is the first stop after Hamar Station in Hamar. Ilseng is also the site of Ilseng Prison.

The 1.06-square-kilometre (260-acre) village has a population (2024) of 977 and a population density of 922 inhabitants per square kilometre (2,390/sq mi). The village does include land in two neighboring municipalities with 0.98 square kilometres (240 acres) and 941 residents in Stange and 0.08 square kilometres (20 acres) and 36 residents in Hamar.
