= Løten Station =

Railway station in Løten, Norway

Løten
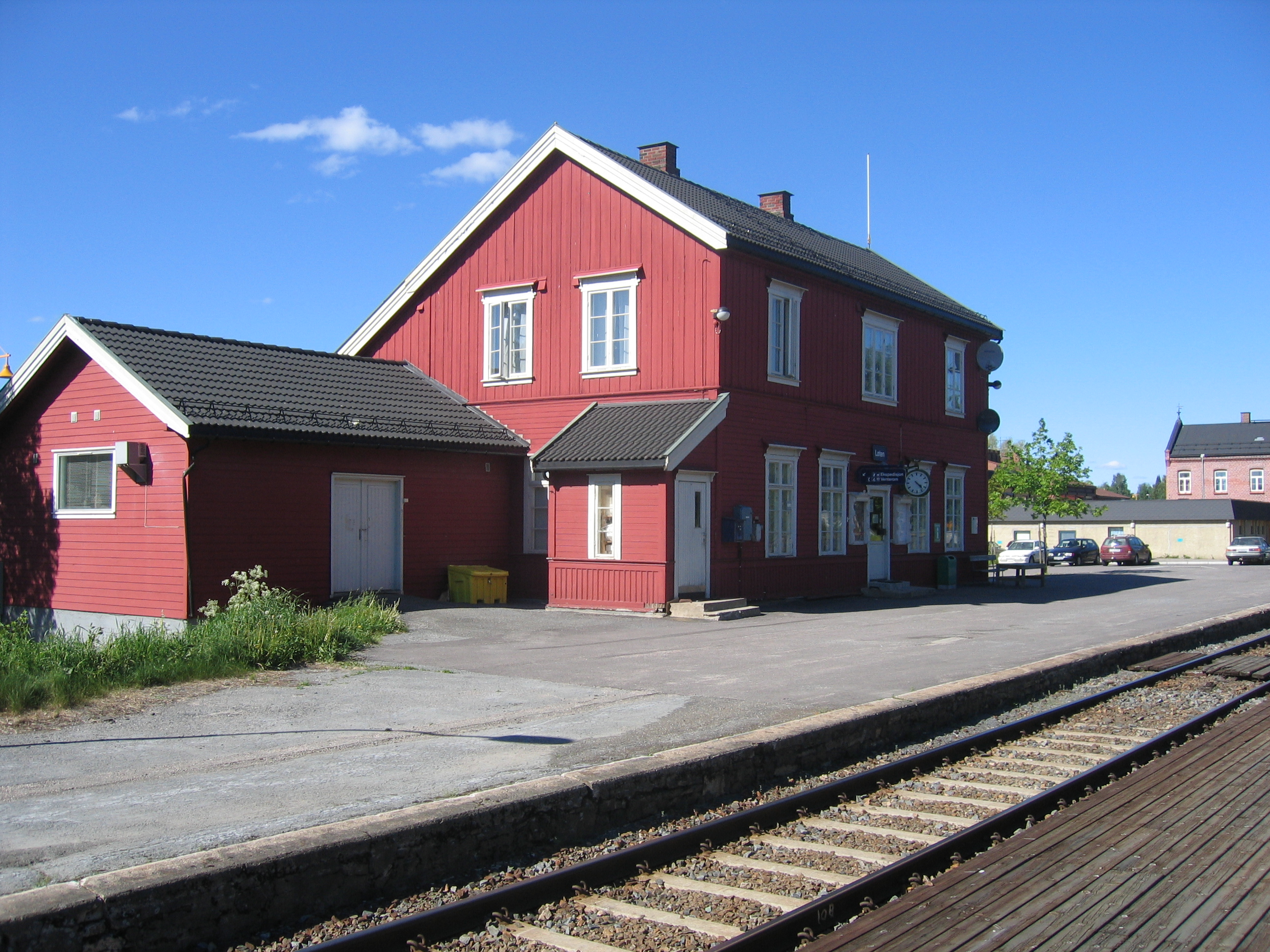

General information
- Location: Løten, Norway
- Coordinates: 60°49′07″N 11°20′32″E
- Elevation: 231.7 m (760 ft)
- Owner: Bane NOR
- Operator: SJ Norge
- Line: Røros Line
- Distance: 17.52 km (10.89 mi)
- Platforms: 2

History
- Opened: 1862
Location

Løten Station (Norwegian: Løten stasjon) is a railway station in Løten Municipality in Innlandet, Norway on the line between Hamar and Elverum. The station is located in the southern area of the main community. It is served by trains on operating the Rørosbanen line. The station is 143.78 kilometres (89.34 mi) from Oslo Sentralstasjon.

The station was opened in 1862 as Berg Station with the completion of the line from Hamar to Grundset. The name was changed to Løiten in 1879 and to Løten in 1919. The station building, which probably contains parts from the original 1862 structure was moved and rebuilt in 1921. The station has been unstaffed since 1997. In addition to being a railway station, the building houses a tourist information desk, a hobby store and a ceramics workshop.

Preceding station			Following station
Ilseng	Røros Line		Elverum
Preceding station	Regional trains		Following station
Ilseng	R60	Hamar–Røros	Elverum
