= Løten Church =

Church in Innlandet, Norway

- Løten kirke
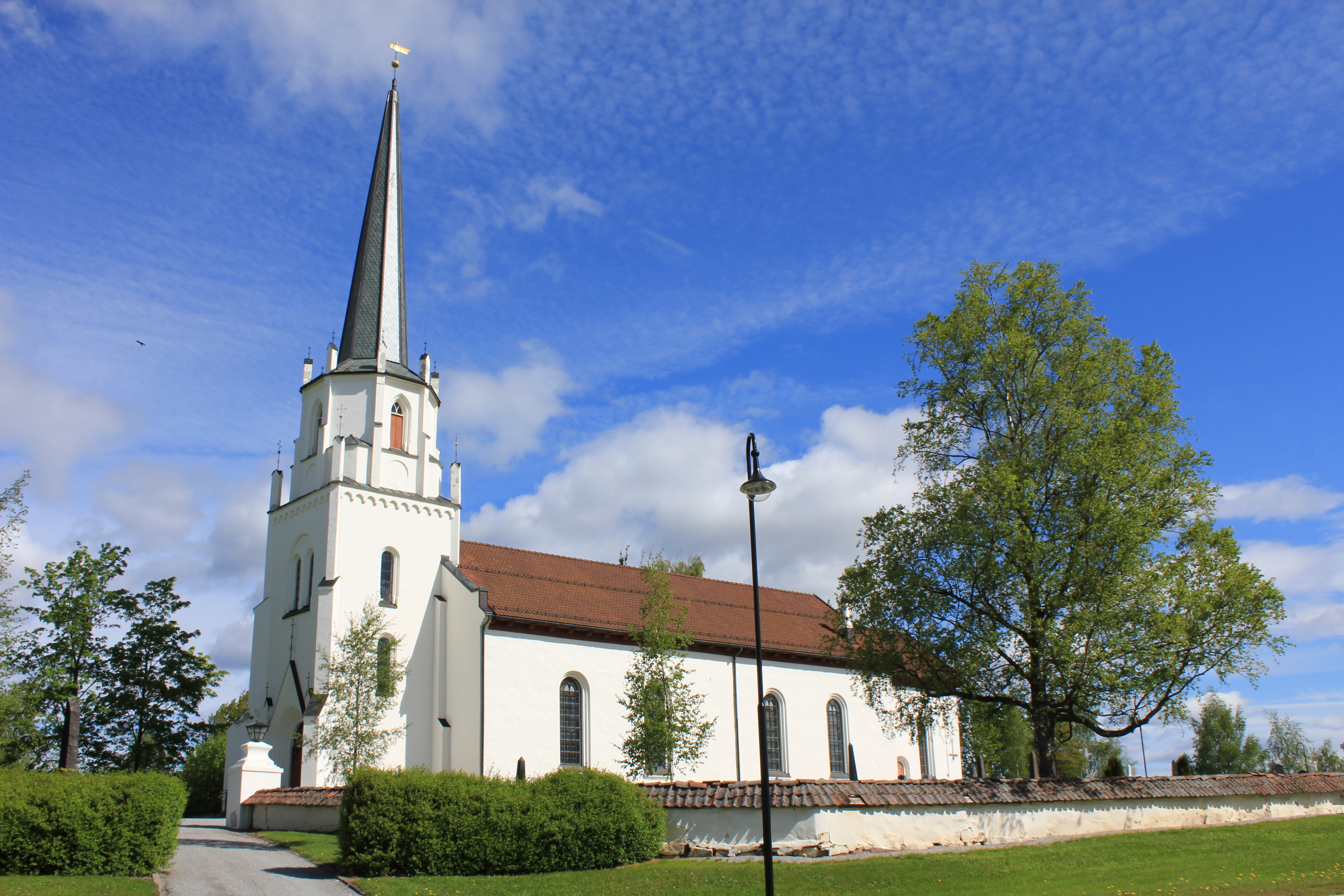
- View of the church
- Løten Church
- 60°49′36″N 11°18′55″E
- Location: Løten Municipality, Innlandet
- Country: Norway
- Denomination: Church of Norway
- Previous denomination: Catholic Church
- Churchmanship: Evangelical Lutheran

History
- Status: Parish church
- Founded: c. 1200
- Consecrated: c. 1200

Architecture
- Functional status: Active
- Architectural type: Long church
- Completed: c. 1200 (826 years ago)

Specifications
- Capacity: 400
- Materials: Stone

Administration
- Diocese: Hamar bispedømme
- Deanery: Hamar domprosti
- Parish: Løten
- Norwegian Cultural Heritage Site
- Type: Church
- Status: Automatically protected
- ID: 84365

Løten Church (Norwegian: Løten kirke) is a parish church of the Church of Norway in Løten Municipality in Innlandet county, Norway. It is located in the village of Løten. It is the main church for the Løten parish which is part of the Hamar domprosti (deanery) in the Diocese of Hamar. The white, stone church was built in a long church design around the year 1200 using plans drawn up by an unknown architect. The church seats about 400 people.

== History ==
The church in Løten was built of stone around the year 1200 with a number of Romanesque features. The church originally had a nave that measured about 12 by 8.5 metres (39 ft × 28 ft) and a choir that measured about 5.8 by 5.2 metres (19 ft × 17 ft). Originally, the church probably did not have a tower. Later, a small tower on the roof of the nave was added.

In 1814, this church served as an election church (Norwegian: valgkirke). Together with more than 300 other parish churches across Norway, it was a polling station for elections to the 1814 Norwegian Constituent Assembly which wrote the Constitution of Norway. This was Norway's first national elections. Each church parish was a constituency that elected people called "electors" who later met together in each county to elect the representatives for the assembly that was to meet at Eidsvoll Manor later that year.

During the 19th century, a time marked by population growth and regulations that required a certain proportion of the congregation to have a place in the church, the church was enlarged. From 1872 to 1873, the nave was doubled in size by adding on to the west. Also, a new church porch and tower were built on the west end of the newly enlarged nave with all new windows. A new pulpit and altarpiece were also put in the church during this time. This construction project was designed by the architect Otto Schønheyder and Herman Frang was the lead builder. During the 1950s, the sacristy was built adjacent to the choir. The church was externally restored in 1989–1990 with an interior refurbishment in 1995.

== Media gallery ==
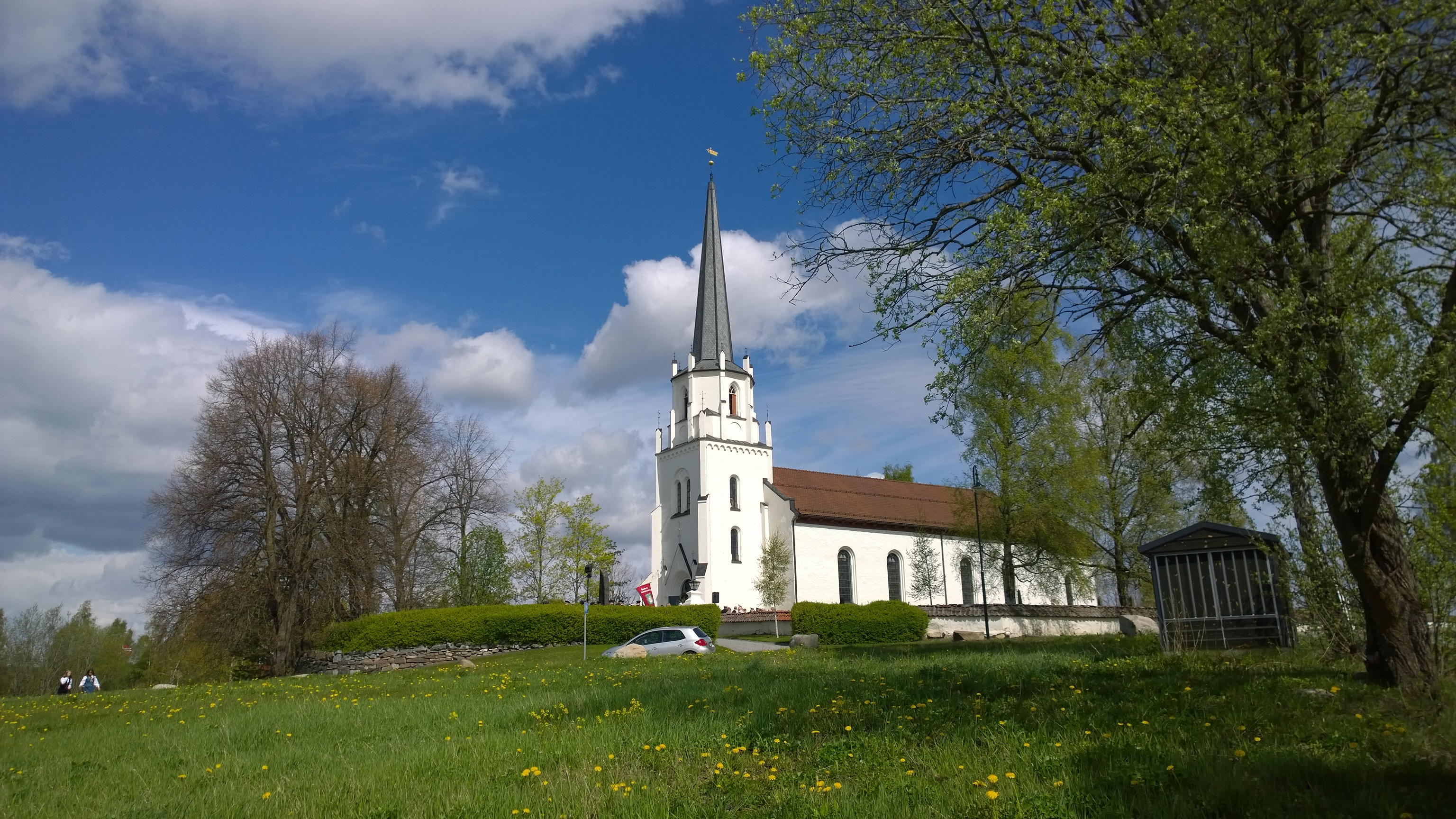

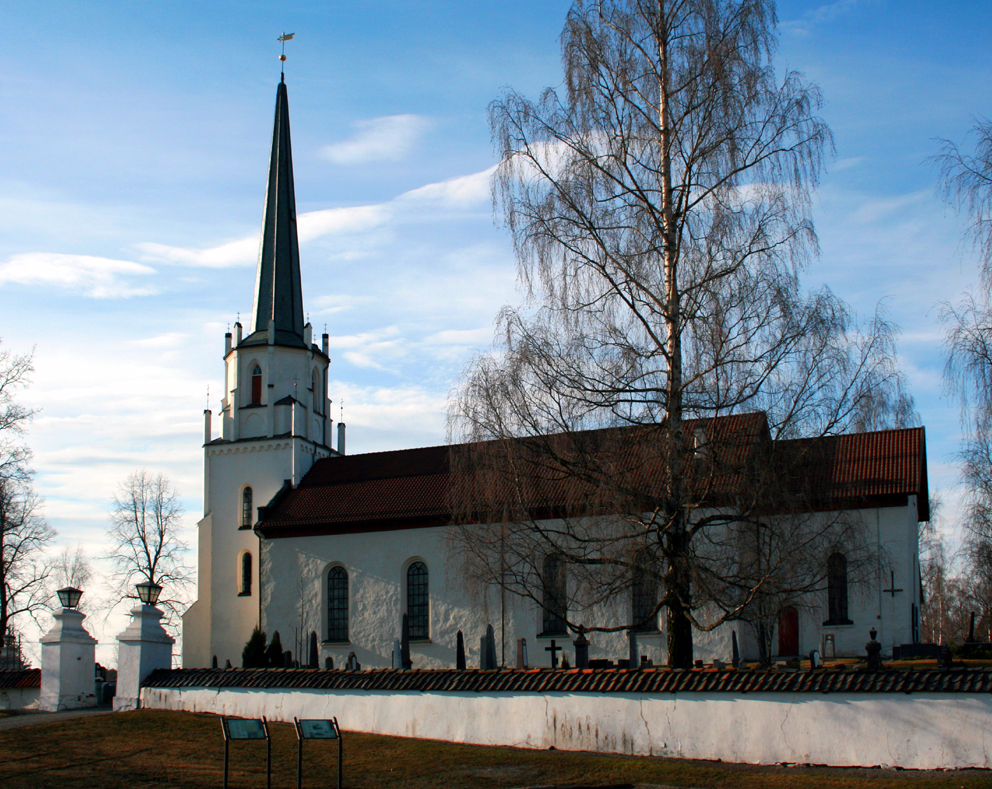

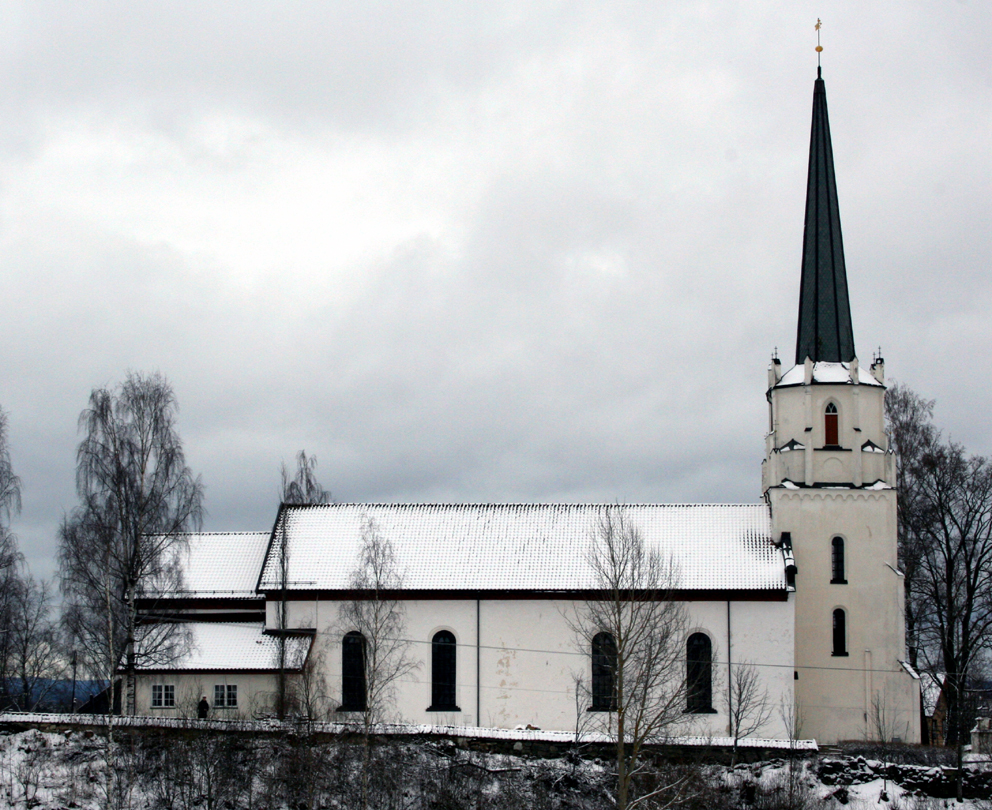

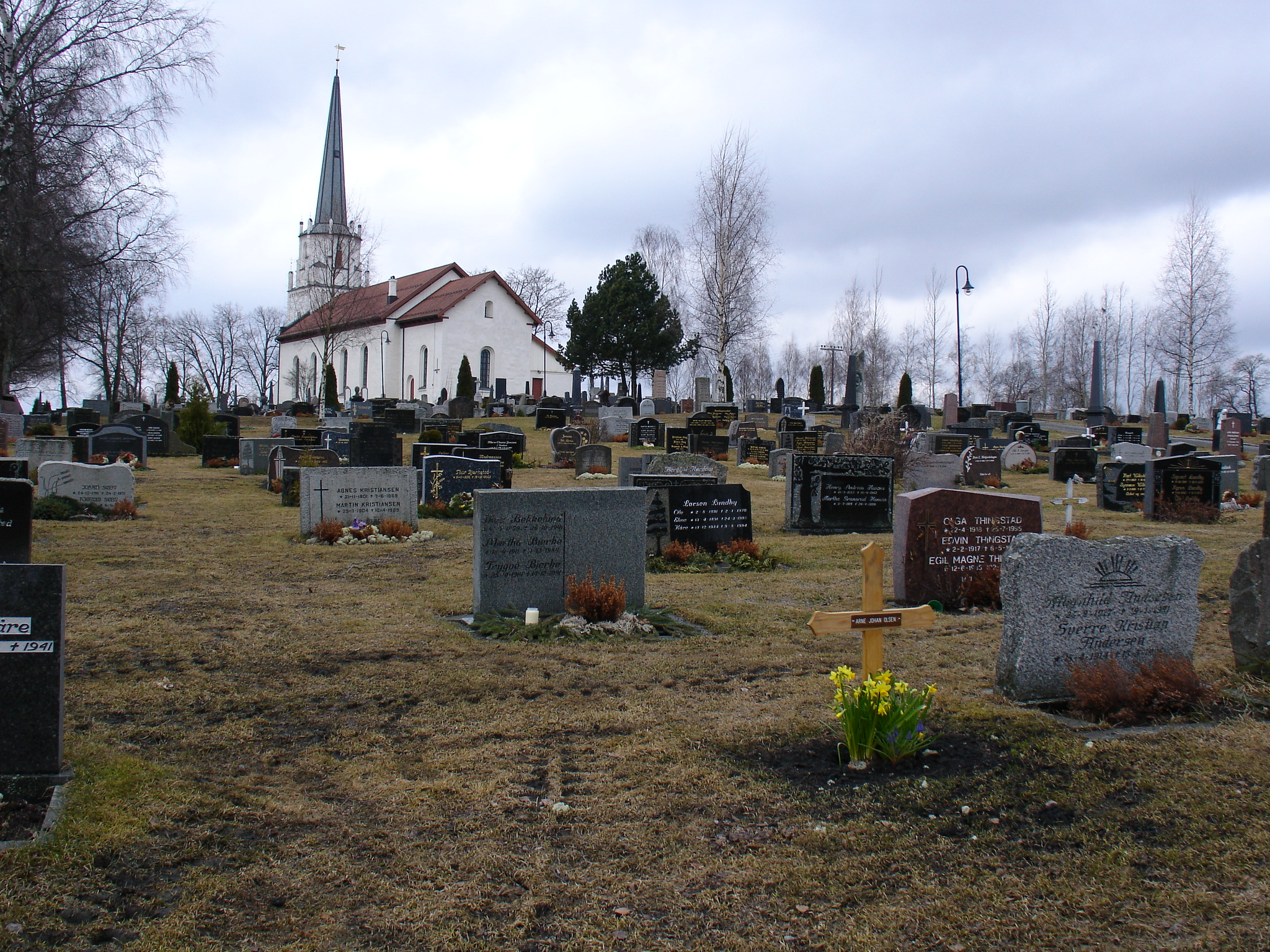

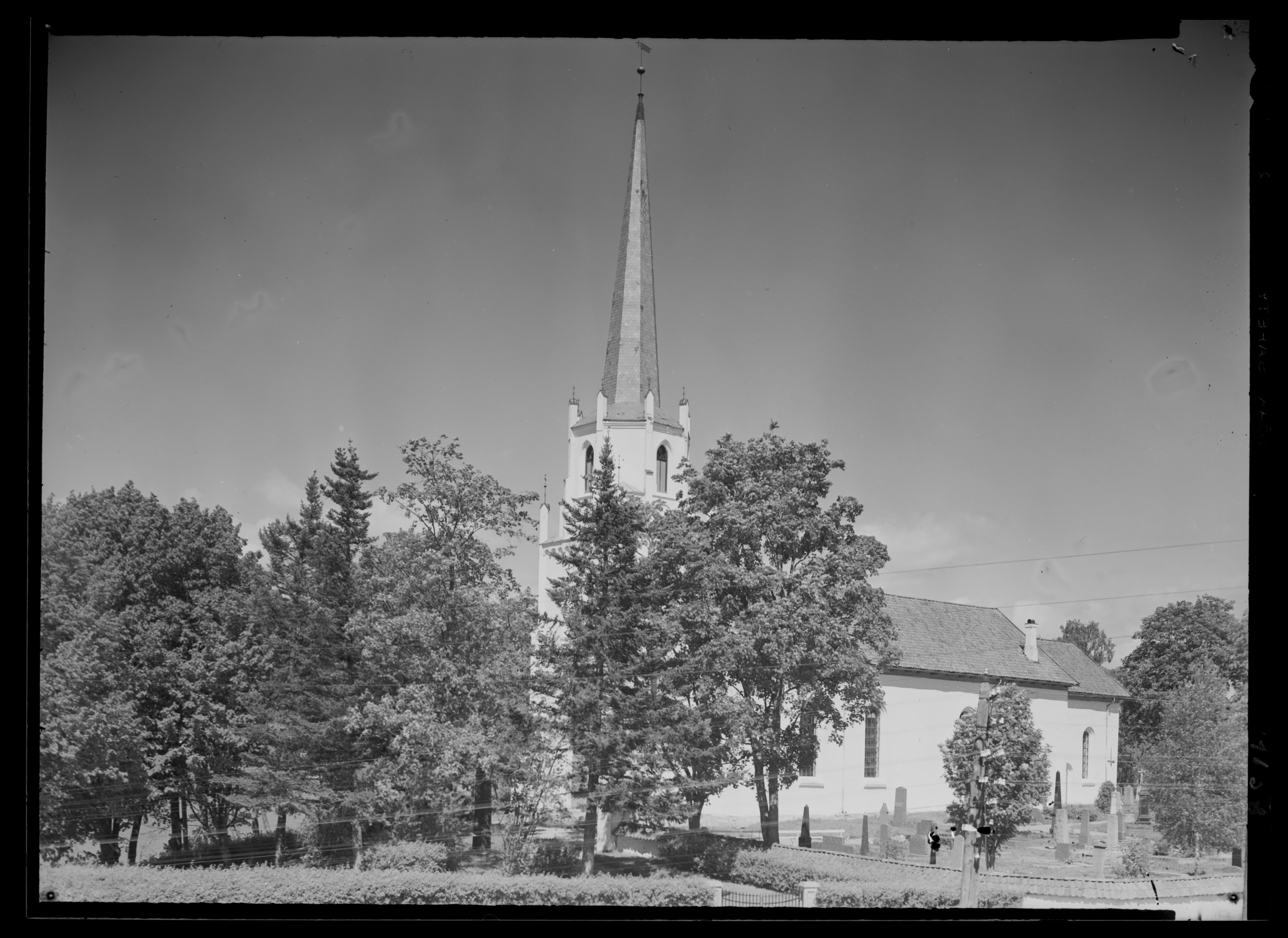

== See also ==
- List of churches in Hamar
