= Løten (village) =

Village in Innlandet, Norway

- Village
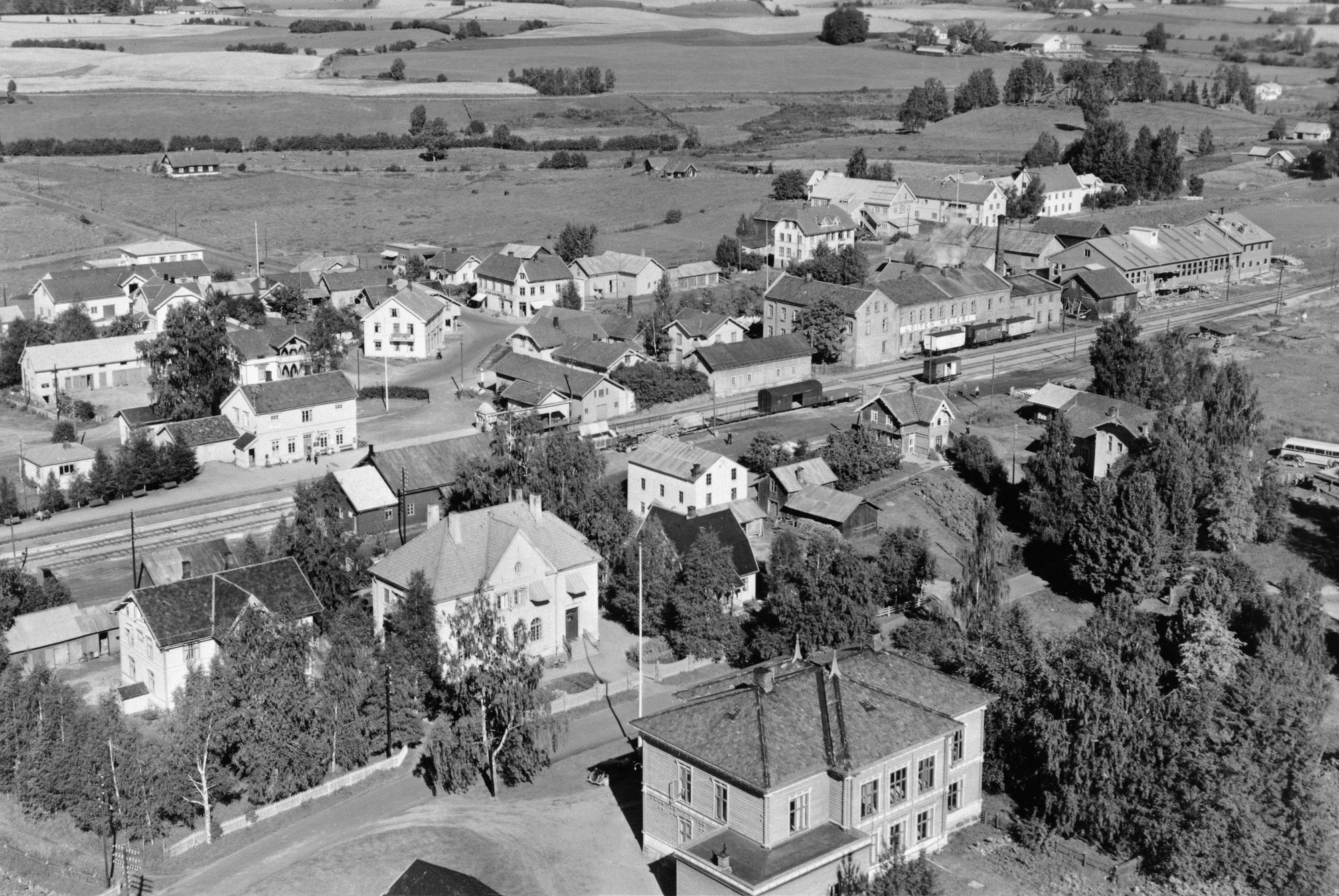
- View of the village (1951)
- Interactive map of Løten
- Location within Innlandet Location within Norway
- Coordinates: 60.81941°N 11.34209°E
- Country: Norway
- Region: Eastern Norway
- County: Innlandet
- District: Hedmarken
- Municipality: Løten Municipality

Area
  - Total: 1.88 km^{2} (0.73 sq mi)
- Elevation: 228 m (748 ft)

Population (2024)
  - Total: 2,964
  - Density: 1,577/km^{2} (4,080/sq mi)
- Time zone: UTC+01:00 (CET)
  - Summer (DST): UTC+02:00 (CEST)
- Post Code: 2340 Løten

Løten is the administrative centre of Løten Municipality in Innlandet county, Norway. The village is located about 15 kilometres (9.3 mi) east of the town of Hamar. The village of Ådalsbruk lies about 4 kilometres (2.5 mi) to the south and the village of Brenneriroa lies about 2 kilometres (1.2 mi) to the northwest. Løten Church lies about 1 kilometre (0.62 mi) northwest of the village.

The 1.88-square-kilometre (460-acre) village has a population (2024) of 2,964 and a population density of 1,577 inhabitants per square kilometre (4,080/sq mi).

The Rørosbanen railway line runs through the village, stopping at the Løten Station. The Norwegian National Road 3 passes by the north side of the village.

== Media gallery ==
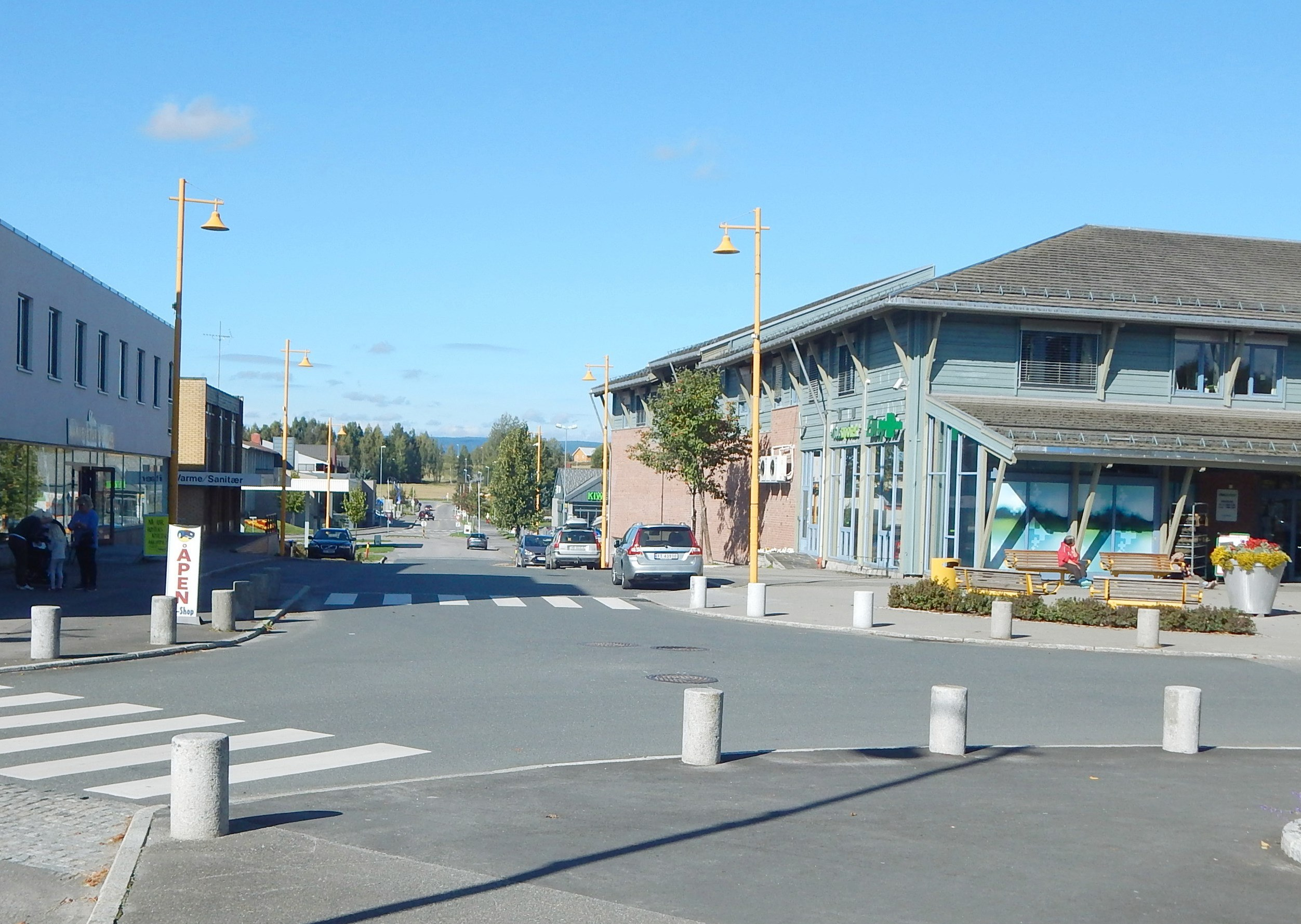

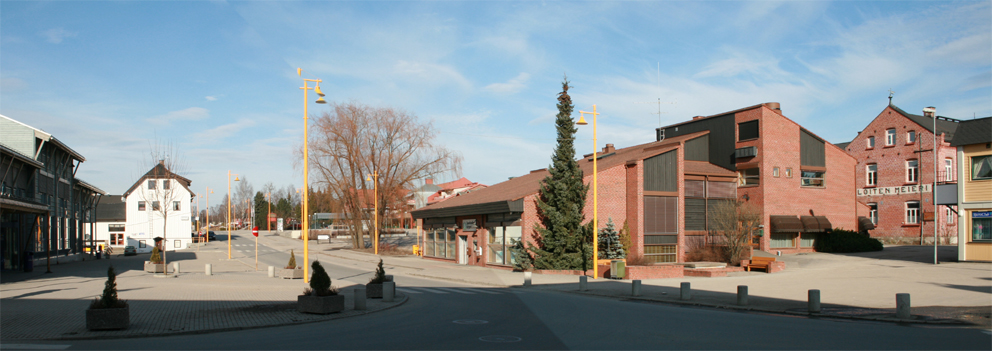

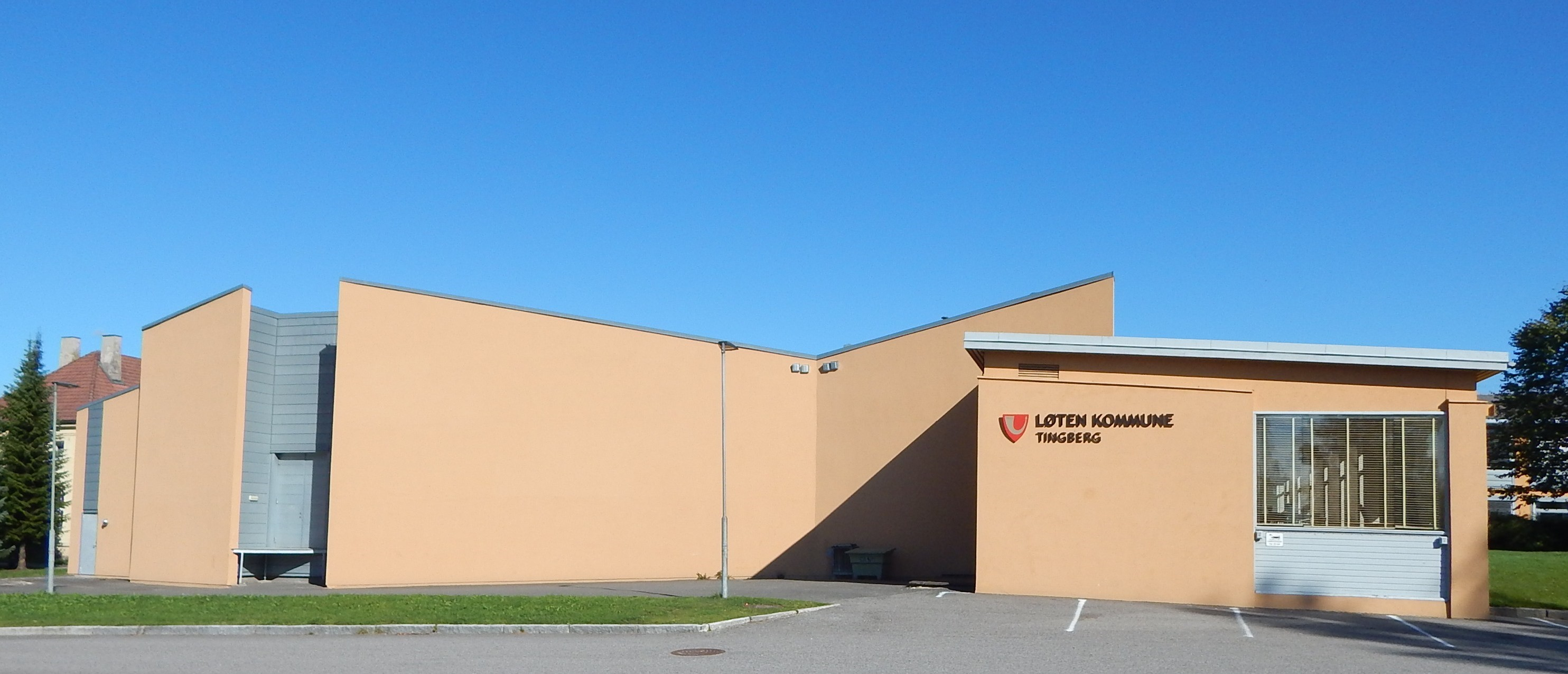

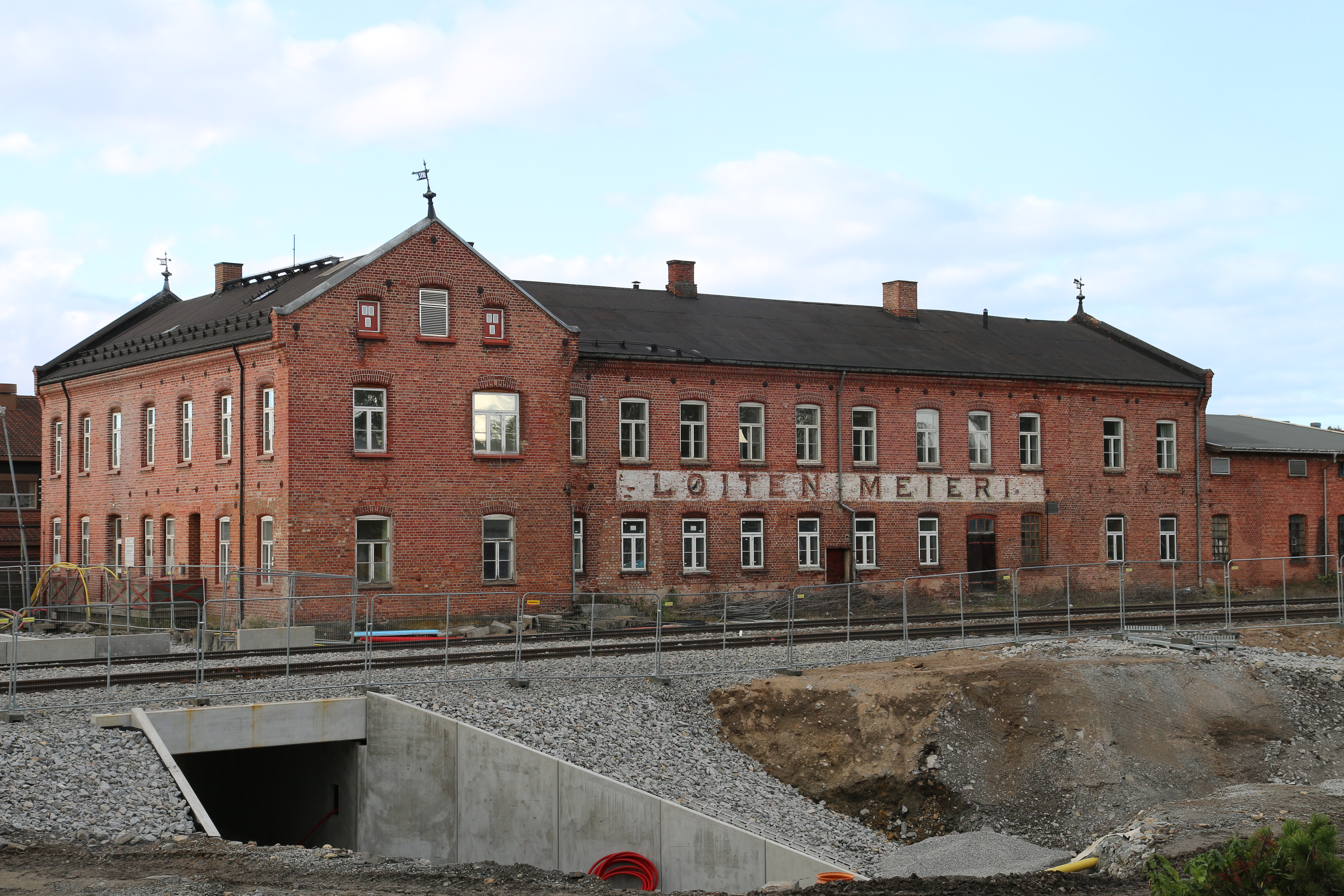
