= Løten Municipality =

Municipality in Innlandet, Norway

Løten Municipality Løten kommune
- Municipality
- Løiten herred (historic name)
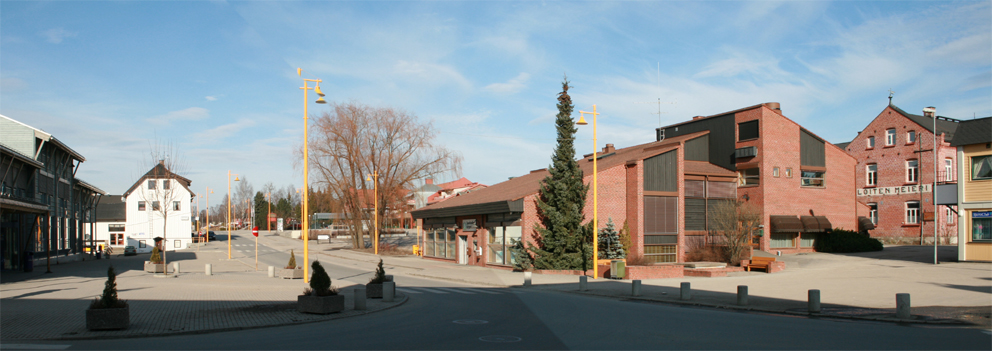
- View of the village of Løten

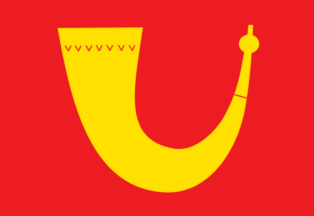
- Flag Coat of arms

- Innlandet within Norway

- Løten within Innlandet
- Coordinates: 60°49′31″N 11°23′27″E
- Country: Norway
- County: Innlandet
- District: Hedmarken
- Established: 1 Jan 1838
  - Created as: Formannskapsdistrikt
- Administrative centre: Løten

Government
  - Mayor (2019): Marte Larsen Tønseth (Sp)

Area
  - Total: 369.44 km^{2} (142.64 sq mi)
  - Land: 362.29 km^{2} (139.88 sq mi)
  - Water: 7.15 km^{2} (2.76 sq mi) 1.9%
  - Rank: #246 in Norway
- Highest elevation: 851.96 m (2,795.1 ft)

Population (2025)
  - Total: 7,931
  - Rank: #133 in Norway
  - Density: 21.5/km^{2} (56/sq mi)
  - Change (10 years): ▲ +5.1%
- Demonym: Løtensokning

Official language
  - Norwegian form: Bokmål
- Time zone: UTC+01:00 (CET)
  - Summer (DST): UTC+02:00 (CEST)
- ISO 3166 code: NO-3412
- Website: Official website

Løten is a municipality in Innlandet county, Norway. It is located in the traditional district of Hedmarken. The administrative centre of the municipality is the village of Løten. Other villages in the municipality include Ådalsbruk, Heimdal, and Brenneriroa.

The 369-square-kilometre (142 sq mi) municipality is the 246th largest by area out of the 357 municipalities in Norway. Løten Municipality is the 133rd most populous municipality in Norway with a population of 7,931. The municipality's population density is 21.5 inhabitants per square kilometre (56/sq mi) and its population has increased by 5.1% over the previous 10-year period.

== General information ==
The parish of Løiten was established as a municipality on 1 January 1838 (see formannskapsdistrikt law). The spelling of the name was later changed to Løten. The boundaries of the municipality have never changed.

Historically, the municipality was part of the old Hedmark county. On 1 January 2020, the municipality became a part of the newly-formed Innlandet county (after Hedmark and Oppland counties were merged).

=== Name ===
The municipality (originally the parish) is named after the old Løten farm (Old Norse: Lautvin). The actual farm is probably the one which is now called Prestgarden (meaning "the vicarage"), where the first Løten Church was built. The first element is laut which means "hollow depression". (There is a long depression between the Prestgarden and the old church.) The last element is vin which means "meadow" or "pasture". Historically, the name of the municipality was spelled Leuten or Leuthen. In 1838 the spelling was changed to Løiten. On 3 November 1917, a royal resolution changed the spelling of the name of the municipality to Løten.

=== Coat of arms ===
The coat of arms was granted on 7 September 1984. The official blazon is "Gules, a drinking horn Or" (Norwegian: I rødt et gull drikkehorn). This means the arms have a red field (background) and the charge is a drinking horn from the Middle Ages. The charge has a tincture of Or which means it is commonly colored yellow, but if it is made out of metal, then gold is used. It represents the historical importance of growing wheat and also the products of the modern Løiten Brænderi (Løten distillery), which was established in 1855. The arms were designed by Harald Trætteberg. The municipal flag has the same design as the coat of arms.

=== Churches ===
The Church of Norway has one parish (sokn) within Løten Municipality. It is part of the Hamar domprosti (arch-deanery) in the Diocese of Hamar.

Churches in Løten
Parish (sokn)	Church name	Location of the church	Year built
Løten	Løten Church	Løten	c. 1200
Løten	Oppegård Chapel	Oppegård	1886
Løten	Oset Chapel	Oset	1885

== History ==
There has been traffic from east to west through Løten, throughout all recorded periods of history and archeological evidence supports earlier trade along this route. The old village center was formed around the Løten Church, which was built during the 13th century.

When King Christian IV of Denmark prohibited the importation of German beer in the early 17th Century, distillation began in Norway. In 1624, distilled alcohol was prohibited at weddings, and by 1638 King Christian forbade the clergy the right to distill in their own homes. The corn-growing districts of Løten, Vang, and Romedal all became famous for their distilleries. "Gamle Løiten" from Løiten Brænderi, which was established in 1855, was a highly prized "akvavit" produced in Løten.

When the railway was opened in 1862, Løten Station became the new centre of trade and management. The area around the new station grew up as the present village of Løten.

== Government ==
Løten Municipality is responsible for primary education (through 10th grade), outpatient health services, senior citizen services, welfare and other social services, zoning, economic development, and municipal roads and utilities. The municipality is governed by a municipal council of directly elected representatives. The mayor is indirectly elected by a vote of the municipal council. The municipality is under the jurisdiction of the Hedmarken og Østerdal District Court and the Eidsivating Court of Appeal.

=== Municipal council ===
The municipal council (Kommunestyre) of Løten is made up of 25 representatives that are elected to four year terms. The tables below show the current and historical composition of the council by political party.

Løten kommunestyre 2023–2027
Party name (in Norwegian)	Number of representatives
Labour Party (Arbeiderpartiet)	6
Progress Party (Fremskrittspartiet)	2
Green Party (Miljøpartiet De Grønne)	1
Conservative Party (Høyre)	2
Norway Democrats (Norgesdemokratene)	1
Red Party (Rødt)	1
Centre Party (Senterpartiet)	10
Socialist Left Party (Sosialistisk Venstreparti)	2
Total number of members:	25

Løten kommunestyre 2019–2023
Party name (in Norwegian)	Number of representatives
Labour Party (Arbeiderpartiet)	7
Progress Party (Fremskrittspartiet)	1
Green Party (Miljøpartiet De Grønne)	1
Conservative Party (Høyre)	1
Centre Party (Senterpartiet)	14
Socialist Left Party (Sosialistisk Venstreparti)	1
Total number of members:	25

Løten kommunestyre 2015–2019
Party name (in Norwegian)	Number of representatives
Labour Party (Arbeiderpartiet)	11
Progress Party (Fremskrittspartiet)	1
Green Party (Miljøpartiet De Grønne)	1
Conservative Party (Høyre)	2
Centre Party (Senterpartiet)	8
Socialist Left Party (Sosialistisk Venstreparti)	1
Liberal Party (Venstre)	1
Total number of members:	25

Løten kommunestyre 2011–2015
Party name (in Norwegian)	Number of representatives
Labour Party (Arbeiderpartiet)	13
Progress Party (Fremskrittspartiet)	2
Conservative Party (Høyre)	3
Christian Democratic Party (Kristelig Folkeparti)	1
Centre Party (Senterpartiet)	4
Socialist Left Party (Sosialistisk Venstreparti)	1
Liberal Party (Venstre)	1
Total number of members:	25

Løten kommunestyre 2007–2011
Party name (in Norwegian)	Number of representatives
Labour Party (Arbeiderpartiet)	11
Progress Party (Fremskrittspartiet)	3
Conservative Party (Høyre)	2
Pensioners' Party (Pensjonistpartiet)	1
Centre Party (Senterpartiet)	6
Socialist Left Party (Sosialistisk Venstreparti)	2
Total number of members:	25

Løten kommunestyre 2003–2007
Party name (in Norwegian)	Number of representatives
Labour Party (Arbeiderpartiet)	8
Progress Party (Fremskrittspartiet)	2
Conservative Party (Høyre)	2
Centre Party (Senterpartiet)	10
Socialist Left Party (Sosialistisk Venstreparti)	3
Total number of members:	25

Løten kommunestyre 1999–2003
Party name (in Norwegian)	Number of representatives
Labour Party (Arbeiderpartiet)	12
Progress Party (Fremskrittspartiet)	2
Conservative Party (Høyre)	3
Centre Party (Senterpartiet)	5
Socialist Left Party (Sosialistisk Venstreparti)	3
Total number of members:	25

Løten kommunestyre 1995–1999
Party name (in Norwegian)	Number of representatives
Labour Party (Arbeiderpartiet)	13
Conservative Party (Høyre)	2
Centre Party (Senterpartiet)	7
Socialist Left Party (Sosialistisk Venstreparti)	2
Liberal Party (Venstre)	1
Total number of members:	25

Løten kommunestyre 1991–1995
Party name (in Norwegian)	Number of representatives
Labour Party (Arbeiderpartiet)	14
Conservative Party (Høyre)	2
Centre Party (Senterpartiet)	5
Socialist Left Party (Sosialistisk Venstreparti)	4
Total number of members:	25

Løten kommunestyre 1987–1991
Party name (in Norwegian)	Number of representatives
Labour Party (Arbeiderpartiet)	15
Conservative Party (Høyre)	3
Centre Party (Senterpartiet)	3
Socialist Left Party (Sosialistisk Venstreparti)	2
Residents' free list (Bygdefolkets frie liste)	2
Total number of members:	25

Løten kommunestyre 1983–1987
Party name (in Norwegian)	Number of representatives
Labour Party (Arbeiderpartiet)	17
Conservative Party (Høyre)	3
Centre Party (Senterpartiet)	3
Socialist Left Party (Sosialistisk Venstreparti)	2
Total number of members:	25

Løten kommunestyre 1979–1983
Party name (in Norwegian)	Number of representatives
Labour Party (Arbeiderpartiet)	17
Conservative Party (Høyre)	3
Centre Party (Senterpartiet)	4
Socialist Left Party (Sosialistisk Venstreparti)	1
Total number of members:	25

Løten kommunestyre 1975–1979
Party name (in Norwegian)	Number of representatives
Labour Party (Arbeiderpartiet)	17
Conservative Party (Høyre)	1
Centre Party (Senterpartiet)	5
Socialist Left Party (Sosialistisk Venstreparti)	2
Total number of members:	25

Løten kommunestyre 1971–1975
Party name (in Norwegian)	Number of representatives
Labour Party (Arbeiderpartiet)	17
Conservative Party (Høyre)	2
Communist Party (Kommunistiske Parti)	2
Centre Party (Senterpartiet)	4
Total number of members:	25

Løten kommunestyre 1967–1971
Party name (in Norwegian)	Number of representatives
Labour Party (Arbeiderpartiet)	17
Conservative Party (Høyre)	2
Communist Party (Kommunistiske Parti)	2
Centre Party (Senterpartiet)	4
Total number of members:	25

Løten kommunestyre 1963–1967
Party name (in Norwegian)	Number of representatives
Labour Party (Arbeiderpartiet)	17
Conservative Party (Høyre)	3
Communist Party (Kommunistiske Parti)	2
Centre Party (Senterpartiet)	3
Total number of members:	25

Løten herredsstyre 1959–1963
Party name (in Norwegian)	Number of representatives
Labour Party (Arbeiderpartiet)	16
Conservative Party (Høyre)	3
Communist Party (Kommunistiske Parti)	3
Centre Party (Senterpartiet)	3
Total number of members:	25

Løten herredsstyre 1955–1959
Party name (in Norwegian)	Number of representatives
Labour Party (Arbeiderpartiet)	16
Conservative Party (Høyre)	2
Communist Party (Kommunistiske Parti)	3
Farmers' Party (Bondepartiet)	4
Total number of members:	25

Løten herredsstyre 1951–1955
Party name (in Norwegian)	Number of representatives
Labour Party (Arbeiderpartiet)	16
Conservative Party (Høyre)	2
Communist Party (Kommunistiske Parti)	3
Farmers' Party (Bondepartiet)	3
Total number of members:	24

Løten herredsstyre 1947–1951
Party name (in Norwegian)	Number of representatives
Labour Party (Arbeiderpartiet)	14
Conservative Party (Høyre)	2
Communist Party (Kommunistiske Parti)	5
Farmers' Party (Bondepartiet)	3
Total number of members:	24

Løten herredsstyre 1945–1947
Party name (in Norwegian)	Number of representatives
Labour Party (Arbeiderpartiet)	13
Communist Party (Kommunistiske Parti)	6
Christian Democratic Party (Kristelig Folkeparti)	1
Joint List(s) of Non-Socialist Parties (Borgerlige Felleslister)	4
Total number of members:	24

Løten herredsstyre 1937–1940*
Party name (in Norwegian)	Number of representatives
Labour Party (Arbeiderpartiet)	16
Conservative Party (Høyre)	4
Farmers' Party (Bondepartiet)	4
Total number of members:	24
Note: Due to the German occupation of Norway during World War II, no elections were held for new municipal councils until after the war ended in 1945.

=== Mayors ===
The mayor (Norwegian: ordfører) of Løten Municipality is the political leader of the municipality and the chairperson of the municipal council. Here is a list of people who have held this position:

- 1838–1839: Axel Quinsgård
- 1840–1840: T.A. Gjestvang
- 1841–1844: Ole Rasmussen Grøholt
- 1847–1848: Johan Fredrik Wilhelm Larsen
- 1849–1856: Ole Rasmussen Grøholt
- 1857–1864: Hedvard Norderhaug
- 1865–1866: Per Sigstad
- 1867–1868: Jens Grøholt
- 1873–1874: Thore Sigstad, Jr.
- 1875–1875: Jens Grøholt
- 1881–1882: Håkon Qvæken
- 1883–1884: Mathias Rustad
- 1885–1886: Thv. Gjestvang
- 1887–1890: Mathias Rustad
- 1891–1891: Thv. Gjestvang
- 1892–1894: Johan D. Karterud
- 1895–1898: Ole Imset
- 1899–1901: Karl Wefring
- 1902–1907: Gudbrand Søberg
- 1908–1910: Edvard Holth
- 1911–1913: Johan Kleppen
- 1914–1916: J. Englaugsmoen
- 1917–1919: N. Thorshaug
- 1920–1925: M.A. Nordli
- 1926–1928: Kristen O. Ommang
- 1929–1931: M.A. Nordli
- 1932–1940: Oscar Wilhelm Nilssen
- 1941–1945: Einar Myki
- 1945–1955: Oscar W. Nilssen
- 1956–1959: M.A. Nordli
- 1960–1967: Ole L. Skaugerud
- 1968–1979: Leif Hjelsengsveen
- 1980–1997: Even Østlund (Ap)
- 1997–1999: Bente Elin Lilleøkseth (Ap)
- 1999–2007: Martin Skramstad (Sp)
- 2007–2019: Bente Elin Lilleøkseth (Ap)
- 2019–present: Marte Larsen Tønseth (Sp)

== Geography ==
Number of minorities (1st and 2nd generation) in Løten by country of origin in 2017
Ancestry	Number
Lithuania	95
Poland	84
Thailand	42
Latvia	35
Myanmar	30
Syria	26
Sweden	24
Eritrea	20

Løten lies in the eastern part of the traditional district of Hedmarken. It is surrounded by Hamar Municipality to the west-northwest, Stange Municipality to the west-southwest, and Elverum Municipality to the east. Small portions of Løten Municipality border on Åmot Municipality in the far north and Våler Municipality in the south. The Hedmarksvidda moorland lies in the north.

Løten lies along the "border" between the agricultural wheat fields of the lower part of Eastern Norway (the areas around and south of lake Mjøsa), and the taiga (boreal coniferous forests) that stretch from eastern Norway all the way to Siberia. The highest point in the municipality is the 851.96-metre (2,795.1 ft) tall mountain Gitvola which is located on the Løten-Åmot municipal border.

The border area between the cultivated farm land and the wilderness was written about by the poet Rolf Jacobsen, from Hamar, in his classic poem Tanker ved Ånestadkrysset (Thoughts at the Ånestad crossroad).

== Notable people ==
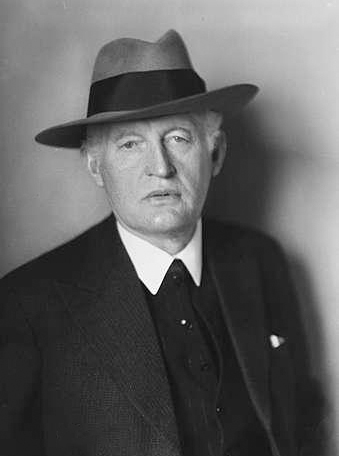
Edvard Munch

- Kristoffer Nilsen Svartbækken Grindalen (1804–1876), the last person in Norway to be sentenced to death for murder (he committed murder in Løten and was executed there)
- Edvard Munch (1863 in Ådalsbruk – 1944), an artist who was famous for painting The Scream
- Helmer Hermansen (1871 in Løten – 1958), a rifle shooter and team silver medallist at the 1900 Summer Olympics
- Marius Røhne (1883 in Løten – 1966), a landscape architect
- Hallvard Trætteberg (1898 in Løten – 1987), a leading Norwegian heraldic artist
- Emil Løvlien (1899 in Løten - 1973), a Norwegian politician and leader of the Communist Party of Norway (1946-1965)
- Einar Johannessen (1926–2016), a radio and TV personality who lived in Løten
- Magne Dæhli (born 1987 in Løten), an orienteer, ski-orienteer, and cross-country skier
- Monika Kørra (born 1989 in Løten), an author and former track and field athlete

== Gallery ==
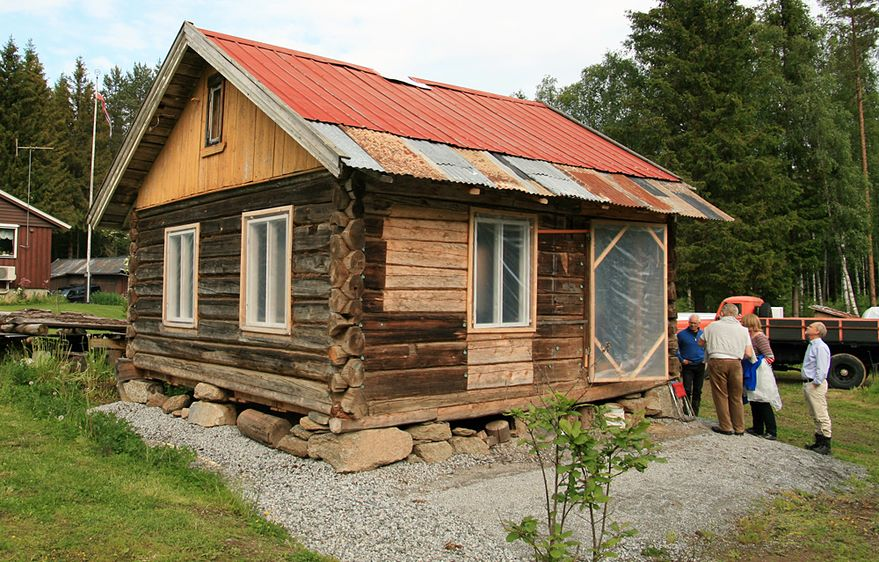
Finstadhaugen i Løten

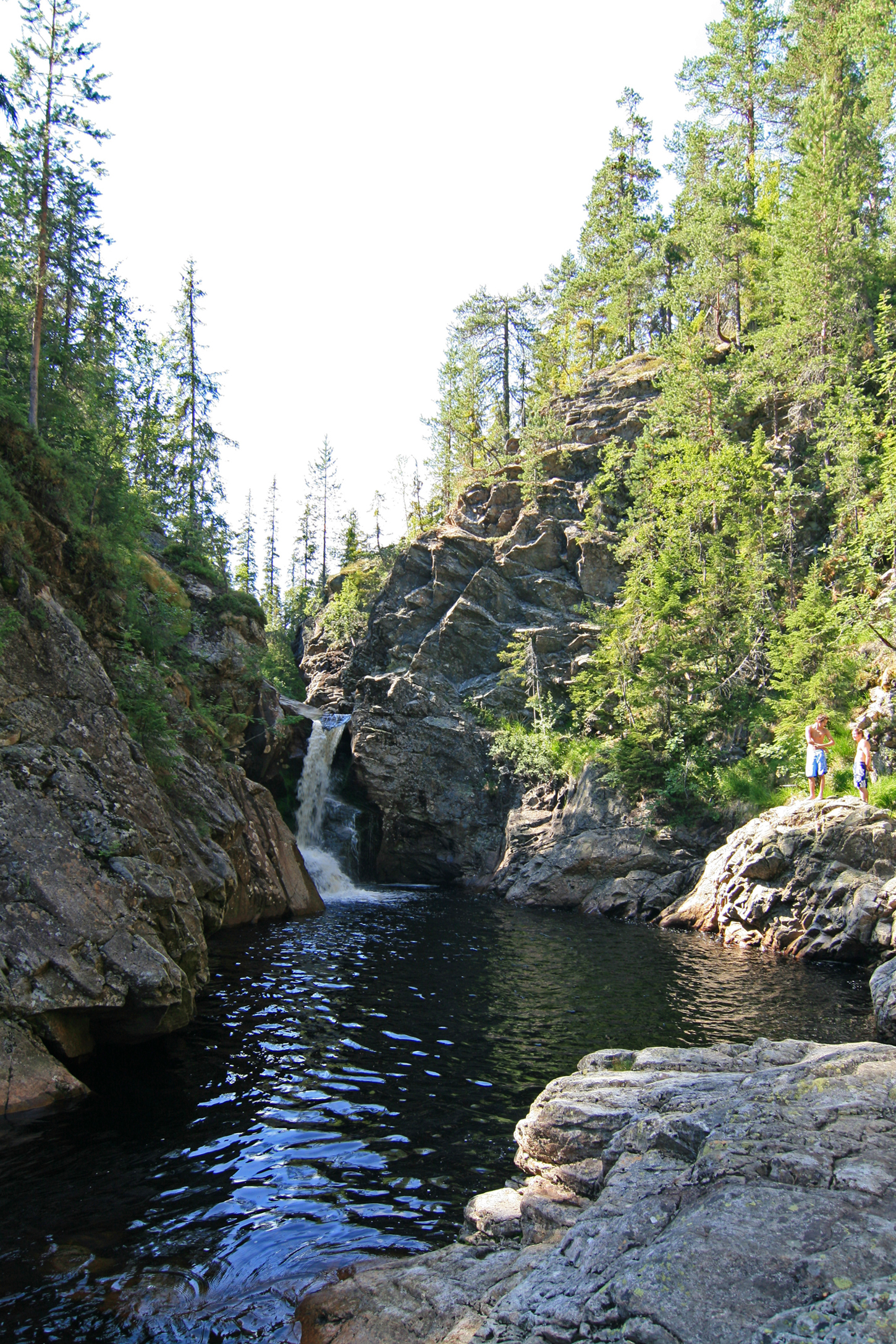
Korpreiret canyon in river Øksna, Løten

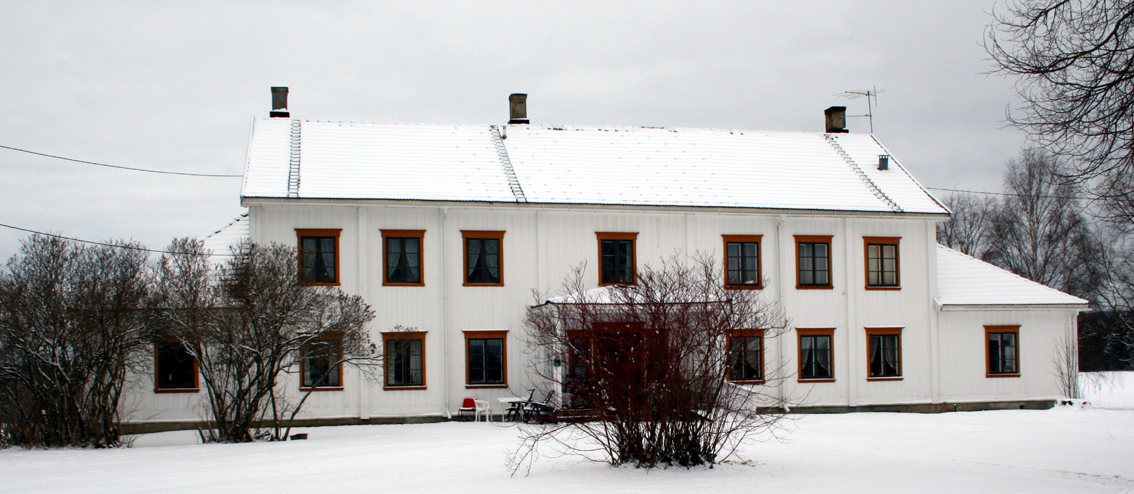
Løten prestegard
