= Nes Municipality (Hedmark) =

Former municipality in Hedmark, Norway

Nes Municipality Nes herred
- Former municipality
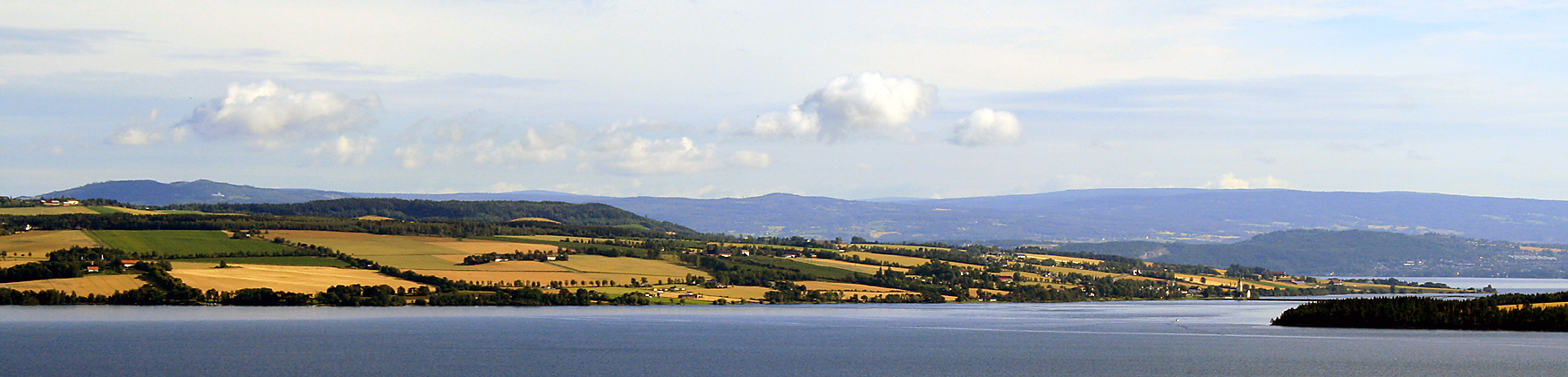
- View of the Nes area

- Hedmark within Norway

- Nes within Hedmark
- Coordinates: 60°45′44″N 10°56′29″E
- Country: Norway
- County: Hedmark
- District: Hedmarken
- Established: 1 Jan 1838
  - Created as: Formannskapsdistrikt
- Disestablished: 1 Jan 1964
  - Succeeded by: Ringsaker Municipality
- Administrative centre: Tingnes

Government
  - Mayor (1947–1964): Leonard Teksum (Ap)

Area (upon dissolution)
  - Total: 176.9 km^{2} (68.3 sq mi)
  - Rank: #403 in Norway
- Highest elevation: 486 m (1,594 ft)

Population (1963)
  - Total: 4,195
  - Rank: #206 in Norway
  - Density: 23.7/km^{2} (61/sq mi)
  - Change (10 years): ▼ −2.5%
- Demonym: Nesning

Official language
  - Norwegian form: Bokmål
- Time zone: UTC+01:00 (CET)
  - Summer (DST): UTC+02:00 (CEST)
- ISO 3166 code: NO-0411

Nes is a former municipality in the old Hedmark county, Norway. The 177-square-kilometre (68 sq mi) municipality existed from 1838 until its dissolution in 1964. The area is now part of Ringsaker Municipality in the traditional district of Hedmarken. The administrative centre was the village of Tingnes where Nes Church is located. The largest village in Nes was Stavsjø where the Stavsjø Church is located. The municipality included the Nes peninsula and the island of Helgøya which both are surrounded by the large lake Mjøsa, Norway's largest lake.

Prior to its dissolution in 1964, the 176.9-square-kilometre (68.3 sq mi) municipality was the 403rd largest by area out of the 689 municipalities in Norway. Nes Municipality was the 206th most populous municipality in Norway with a population of about 4,195. The municipality's population density was 23.7 inhabitants per square kilometre (61/sq mi) and its population had decreased by 2.5% over the previous 10-year period.

== General information ==
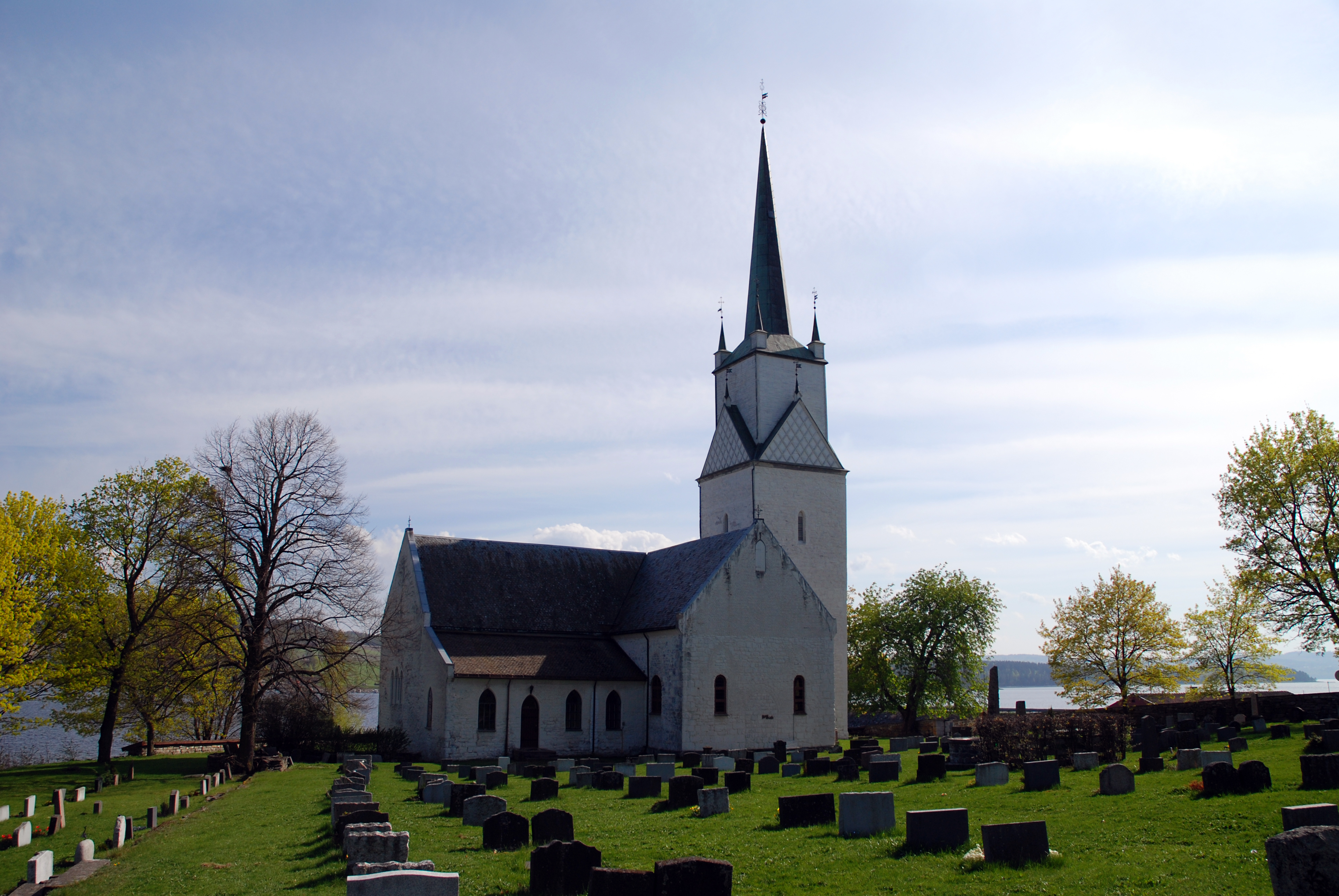
Nes Church

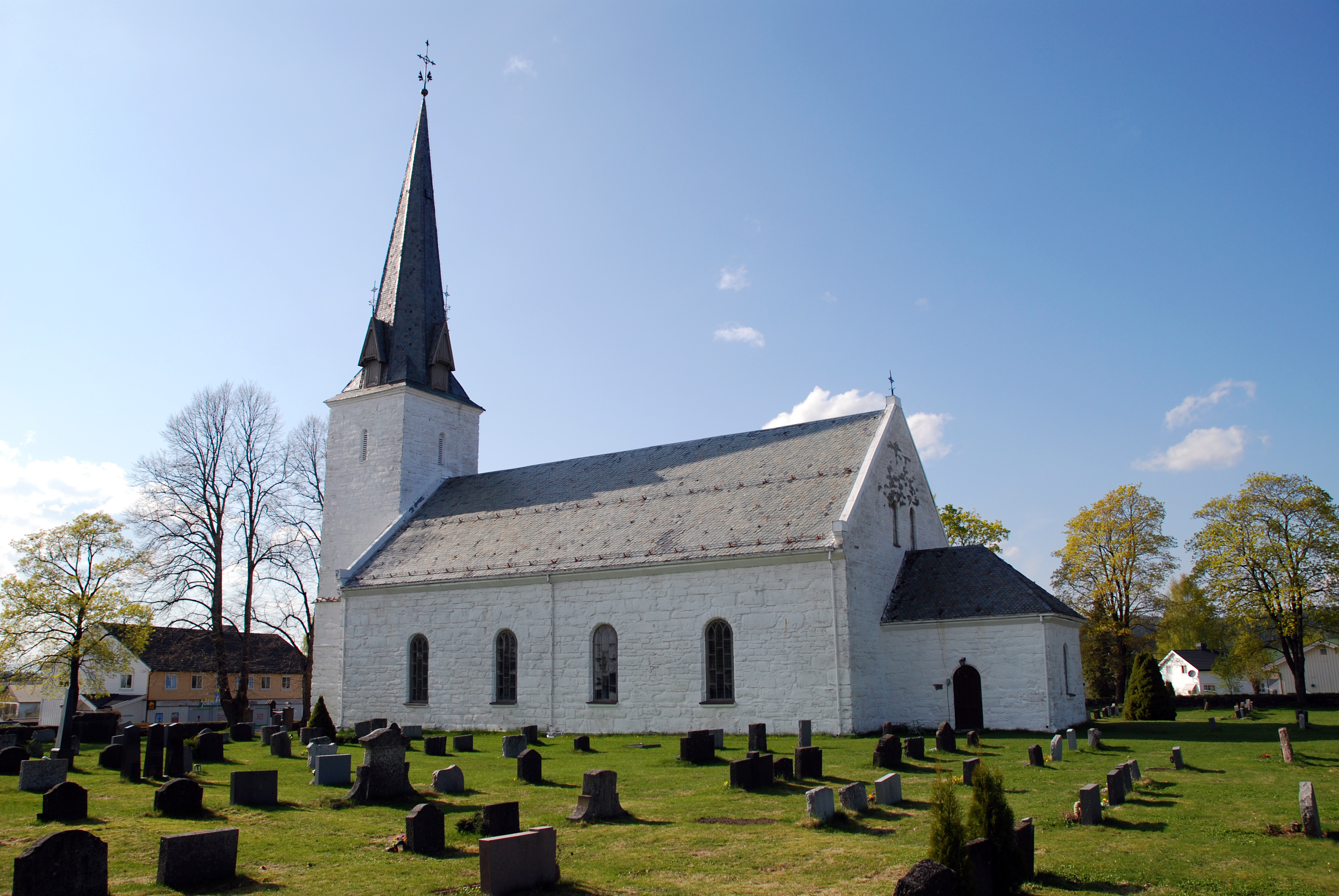
Stavsjø Church

The parish of Næs was established as a municipality on 1 January 1838 (see formannskapsdistrikt law). During the 1960s, there were many municipal mergers across Norway due to the work of the Schei Committee. On 1 January 1964, the following areas were merged to create a new, much larger Ringsaker Municipality:

- Nes Municipality (population: 4,184)
- Furnes Municipality (population: 7,288)
- Ringsaker Municipality (population: 16,490)
- the Hamarsberget and Vikersødegården areas of Vang Municipality (population: 34)

=== Name ===
The municipality (originally the parish) is named after the old Nes farm (Old Norse: Nes) since the first Nes Church was built there. The name is identical to the word nes which means "headland".

=== Churches ===
The Church of Norway had two parishes (sokn) within Nes Municipality. At the time of the municipal dissolution, it was part of the Nes prestegjeld and the Hedemarken prosti (deanery) in the Diocese of Hamar.

Churches in Nes Municipality
Parish (sokn)	Church name	Location of the church	Year built
Nes	Nes Church	Tingnes	c. 1250
Nes	Helgøy Chapel	Helgøya	1870
Stavsjø	Stavsjø Church	Stavsjø	1880

== Geography ==
The municipality included the Nes peninsula and the island of Helgøya which both are surrounded by the large lake Mjøsa, Norway's largest lake. Ringsaker Municipality was located to the north; it was the only municipality with which it shared a land border– all other neighboring municipalities shared a water border since Nes was surrounded by Lake Mjøsa. Furnes Municipality was located to the northeast, the town of Hamar was located the east, and Stange Municipality was located to the southeast. Østre Toten Municipality (in Oppland county) was located to the west across the lake. The highest point in the municipality was the 486-metre (1,594 ft) tall mountain Liberget, located on the border with Ringsaker Municipality.

== Government ==
While it existed, Nes Municipality was responsible for primary education (through 10th grade), outpatient health services, senior citizen services, welfare and other social services, zoning, economic development, and municipal roads and utilities. The municipality was governed by a municipal council of directly elected representatives. The mayor was indirectly elected by a vote of the municipal council. The municipality was under the jurisdiction of the Eidsivating Court of Appeal.

=== Municipal council ===
The municipal council (Herredsstyre) of Nes Municipality was made up of 23 representatives that were elected to four year terms. The tables below show the historical composition of the council by political party.

Nes herredsstyre 1959–1963
Party name (in Norwegian)	Number of representatives
Labour Party (Arbeiderpartiet)	13
Conservative Party (Høyre)	2
Centre Party (Senterpartiet)	5
Liberal Party (Venstre)	3
Total number of members:	23
Note: On 1 January 1964, Nes Municipality became part of Ringsaker Municipality.

Nes herredsstyre 1955–1959
Party name (in Norwegian)	Number of representatives
Labour Party (Arbeiderpartiet)	14
Joint List(s) of Non-Socialist Parties (Borgerlige Felleslister)	9
Total number of members:	23

Nes herredsstyre 1951–1955
Party name (in Norwegian)	Number of representatives
Labour Party (Arbeiderpartiet)	15
Joint List(s) of Non-Socialist Parties (Borgerlige Felleslister)	9
Total number of members:	24

Nes herredsstyre 1947–1951
Party name (in Norwegian)	Number of representatives
Labour Party (Arbeiderpartiet)	16
Conservative Party (Høyre)	2
Farmers' Party (Bondepartiet)	6
Total number of members:	24

Nes herredsstyre 1945–1947
Party name (in Norwegian)	Number of representatives
Labour Party (Arbeiderpartiet)	16
Joint List(s) of Non-Socialist Parties (Borgerlige Felleslister)	8
Total number of members:	24

Nes herredsstyre 1937–1941*
Party name (in Norwegian)	Number of representatives
Labour Party (Arbeiderpartiet)	14
Conservative Party (Høyre)	3
Farmers' Party (Bondepartiet)	7
Total number of members:	24
Note: Due to the German occupation of Norway during World War II, no elections were held for new municipal councils until after the war ended in 1945.

=== Mayors ===
The mayor (Norwegian: ordfører) of Nes Municipality was the political leader of the municipality and the chairperson of the municipal council. The following people have held this position (incomplete list):

- 1838–1839: Niels J. Hoel
- 1839–1840: Johannes Fossum
- 1840–1841: Hans Horn
- 1848–1848: Niels J. Hoel
- 1849–1851: Olaus Røberg
- 1860–1861: Olaus Røberg
- 1861–1873: Ole Evensen Hjelmstad
- 1873–1874: Hans Eeg
- 1875–1882: O. Svartshoel
- 1883–1886: Lars Bye
- 1884–1894: Ole Evensen Hjelmstad
- 1895–1896: Lars Bye
- 1897–1901: Karl Helgeby
- 1902–1909: Capt. E.A. Svartshoel (SmP)
- 1909–1919: O.M. Sterud (H)
- 1920–1928: Mons Ousdal (Bp)
- 1928–1931: Bernhard Larsen (Ap)
- 1931–1937: Gustav Andrén (Ap)
- 1937–1941: Bernhard Larsen (Ap)
- 1941–1944: Eilif Sandberg (NS)
- 1945–1945: Eivind Ellingsen (NS)
- 1945–1945: Emil Elstad (Ap)
- 1945–1947: Olav Strøm (Ap)
- 1947–1964: Leonard Teksum (Ap)4

== See also ==
- List of former municipalities of Norway
