= I natt rømmer vi =

1932 book by Bernhard Stokke

- 1971 edition
- Author: Bernhard Stokke
- Language: Norwegian
- Subject: Boys on the run from a school institution
- Genre: Children's book
- Set in: Helgøya in Hedmark, Norway
- Published: 1932
- Publication place: Norway
- Followed by: På livet løs

I natt rømmer vi is a Norwegian children's book from 1932, written by Bernhard Stokke. The book won first prize in Windju Simonsen's contest for "Best book for boys" and was a bestseller.

== Plot ==
The book is a story about two boys fleeing from a school institution for "bad children". The model was quite obviously the institution Toftes Gave, located at the island Helgøya in the lake Mjøsa, where Stokke had served as a teacher for several years. Everyday life at the institution is described, a strict discipline among 200 boys. They are dressed in uniforms, and march in step to and from work, mostly farm work or in workshops. The two protagonists are the good friends "Harald" and "Willy", both sixteen years old. Harald has grown up at a farm, while Willy grew up in Oslo. Both face troubles at the institution, and they decide to try to escape from the island. One night they climb out through the window, find a rowing boat and successfully reach the landside. While they flee, much happens. Eventually the two boys are caught, and brought back to the institution.

== Sequels ==
I natt rømmer vi was followed by three other books about the same characters. These were På livet løs from 1933, Hvor er Willy from 1935, and På spor efter Willy from 1936.

A Dutch edition was published in 1955.
