= Stavsjø Church =

Church in Innlandet, Norway

- Stavsjø kirke
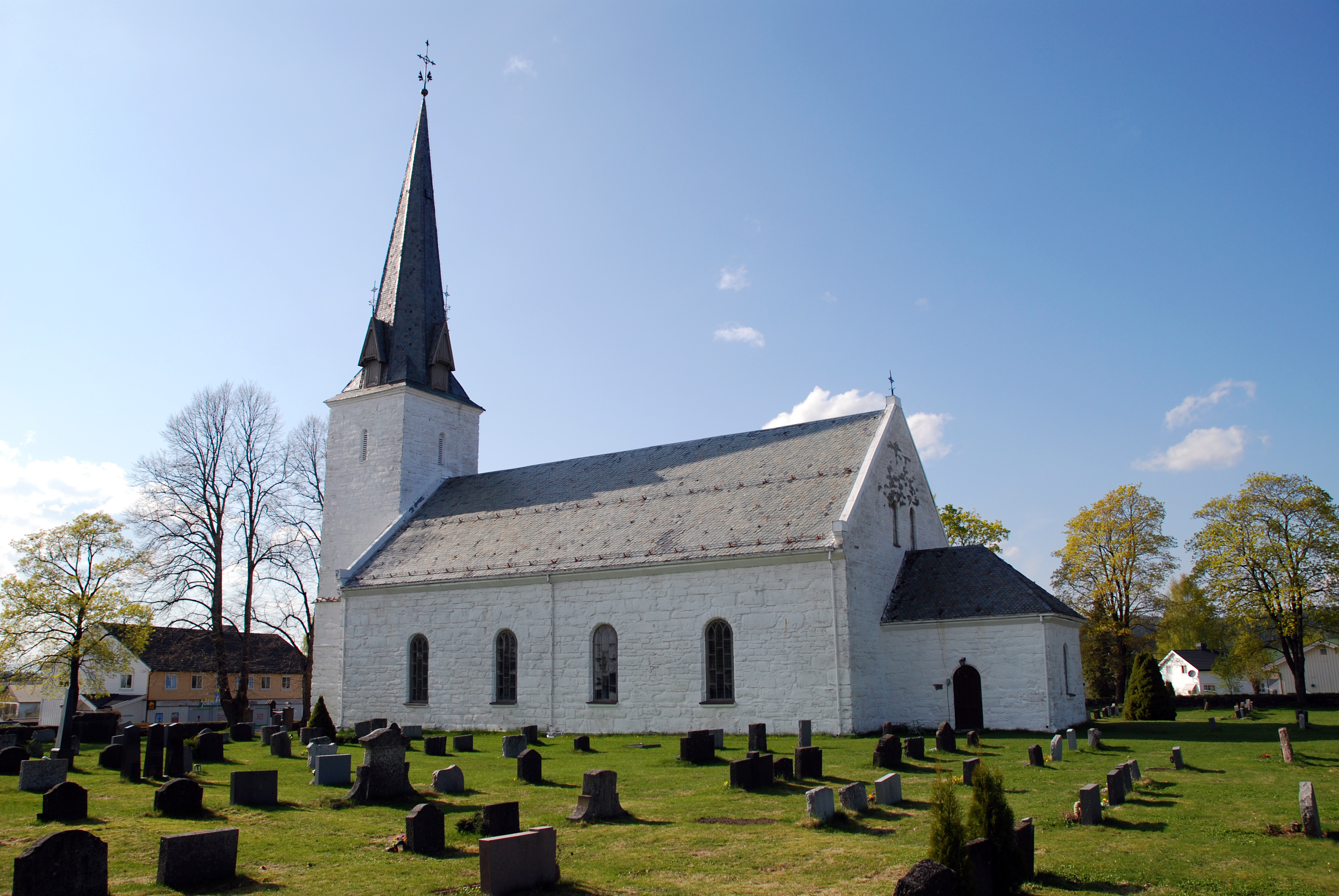
- View of the church
- Stavsjø Church
- 60°48′19″N 10°50′24″E
- Location: Ringsaker Municipality, Innlandet
- Country: Norway
- Denomination: Church of Norway
- Churchmanship: Evangelical Lutheran

History
- Status: Parish church
- Founded: 1880
- Consecrated: 15 September 1880

Architecture
- Functional status: Active
- Architect: Hesler
- Architectural type: Long church
- Completed: 1880 (146 years ago)

Specifications
- Capacity: 260
- Materials: Stone

Administration
- Diocese: Hamar bispedømme
- Deanery: Ringsaker prosti
- Parish: Nes
- Norwegian Cultural Heritage Site
- Type: Church
- Status: Protected
- ID: 85555

Stavsjø Church (Norwegian: Stavsjø kirke) is a parish church of the Church of Norway in Ringsaker Municipality in Innlandet county, Norway. It is located in the village of Stavsjø. It is one of the churches for the Nes parish which is part of the Ringsaker prosti (deanery) in the Diocese of Hamar. The white, wooden church was built in a long church design in 1880 using plans drawn up by the architect Hesler. The church seats about 260 people.

== History ==
The large Nes Church parish has existed for centuries. Since medieval times, Nes Church had an annex church called Baldishol Church, located a few kilometers northwest of Nes Church. By the 1800s, Baldishol Church had been renovated, expanded, and repaired many times and it was in very poor condition. In 1819, the parish requested that the old church be closed, but this took some time because the main church for the parish was not large enough and it needed an annex church. In 1851, a new church law was passed that required churches hold a certain percentage of the parishioners and so it was finally decided to build two new annex churches in the parish and then to close and tear down the old Baldishol Church.

One new church would be built on the island of Helgøya and the other would be built in Stavsjø. In 1870, the new Helgøya Church was completed. After that, work began on the new Stavsjø Church. The building permit was issued in 1874, but due to financial problems, the church was not completed for several years. On 3 March 1878, the old Baldishol Church was torn down. The new Stavsjø Church was completed in 1880, being consecrated on 15 September 1880. Initially, there was some confusion over the name of the new church. The names Jevne, Penningrud, and Stavsjø were all used initially used since all three were local names of the farms in the area. It wasn't until 1911, that the church was officially named Stavsjø Church.

== Media gallery ==
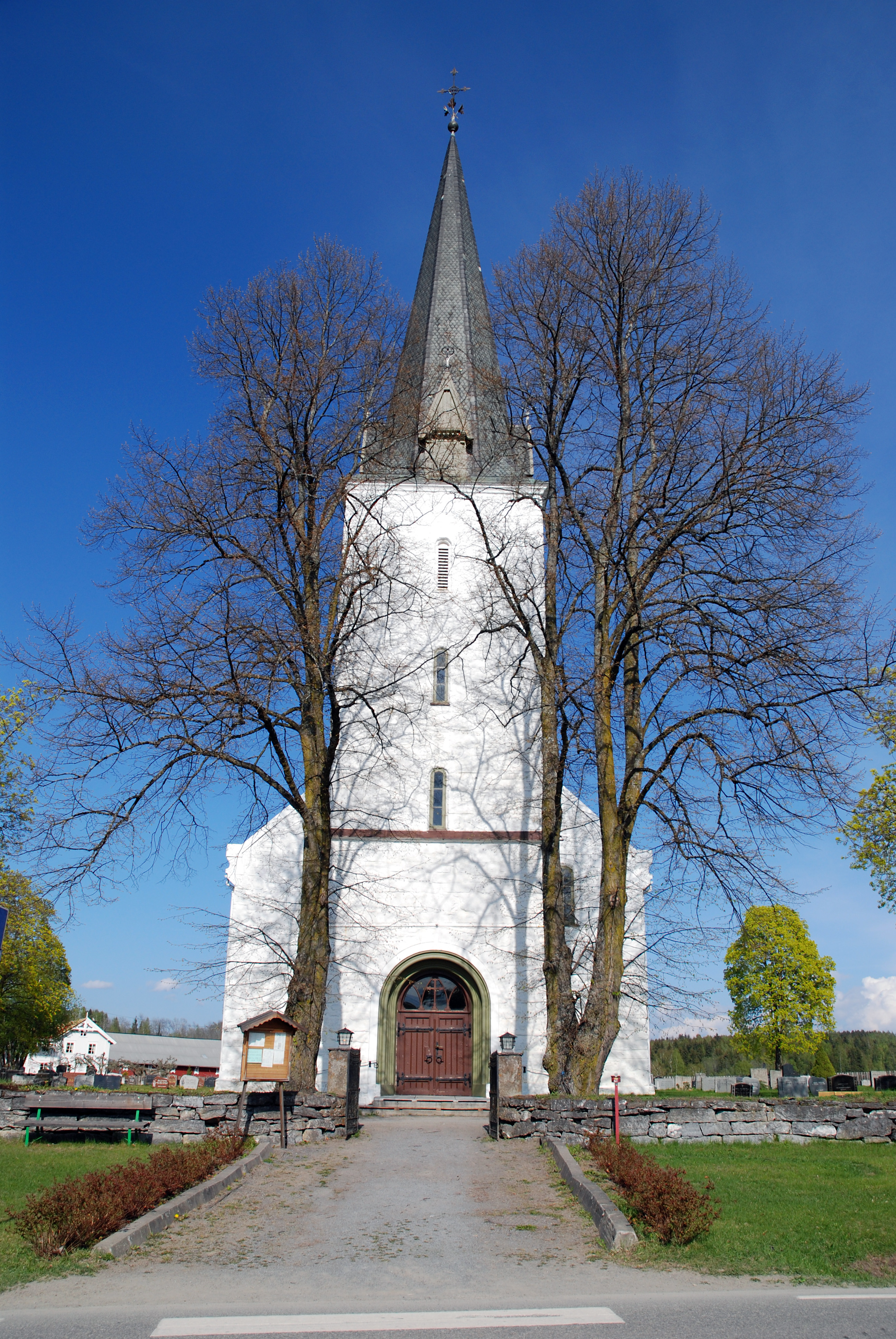

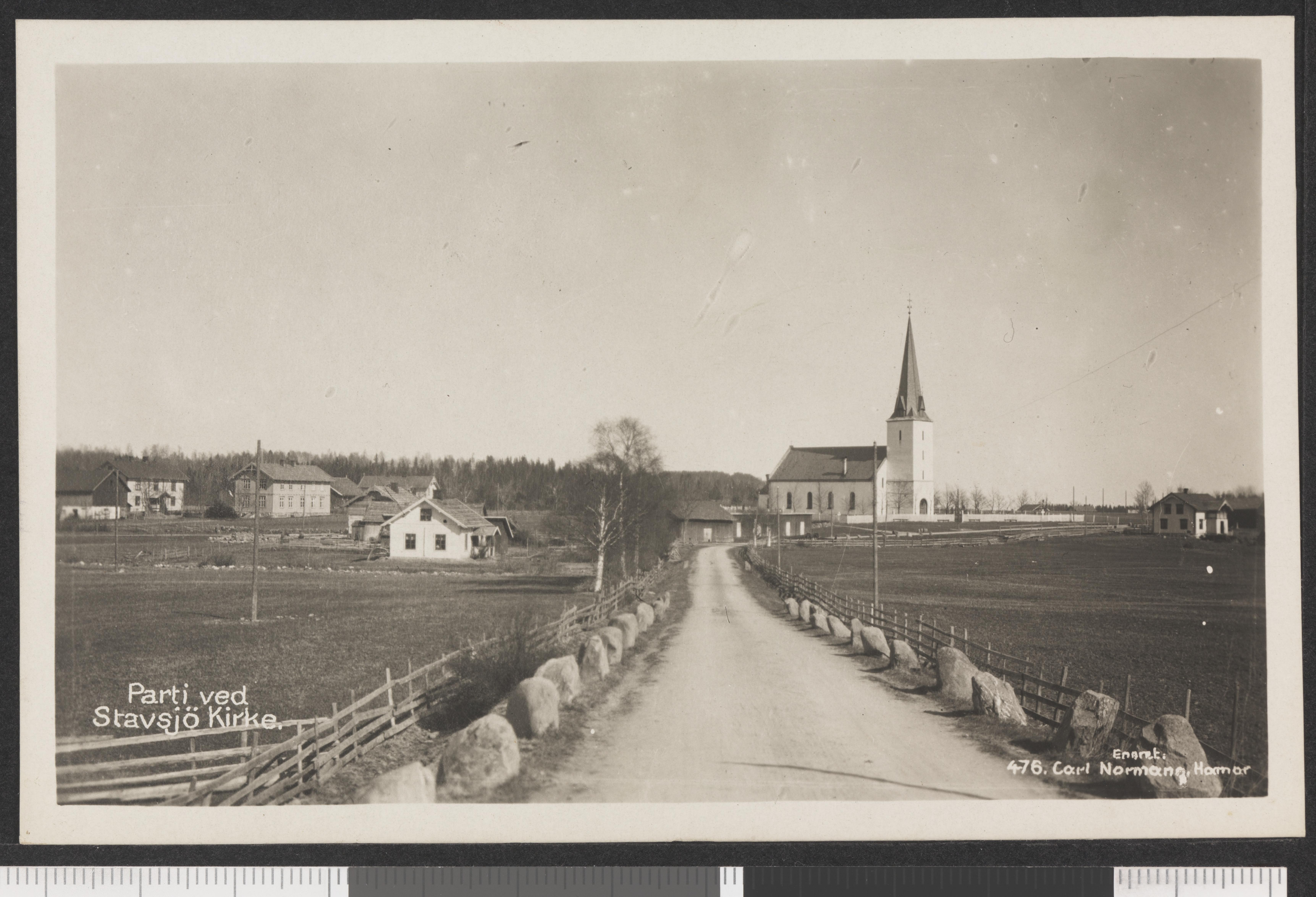

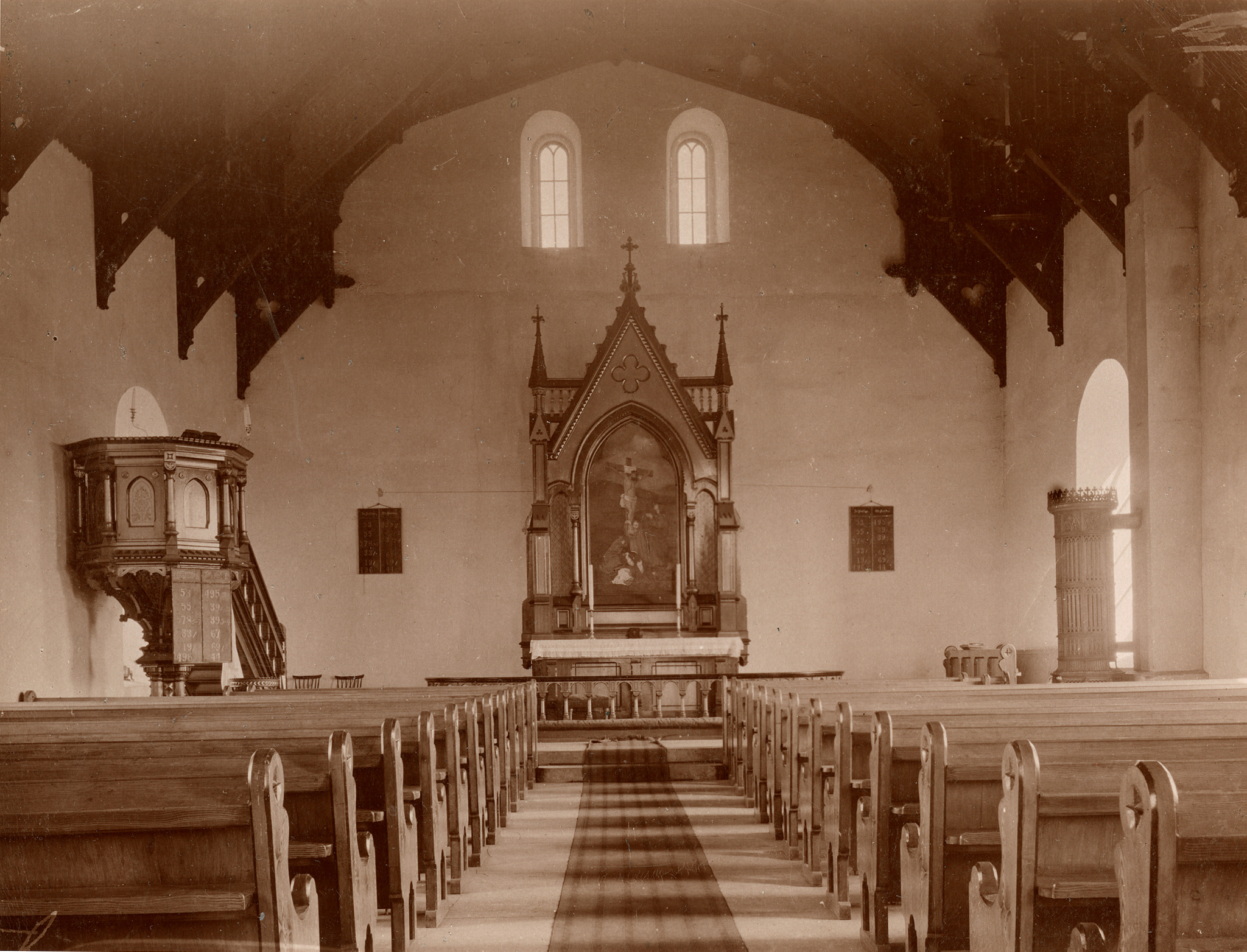

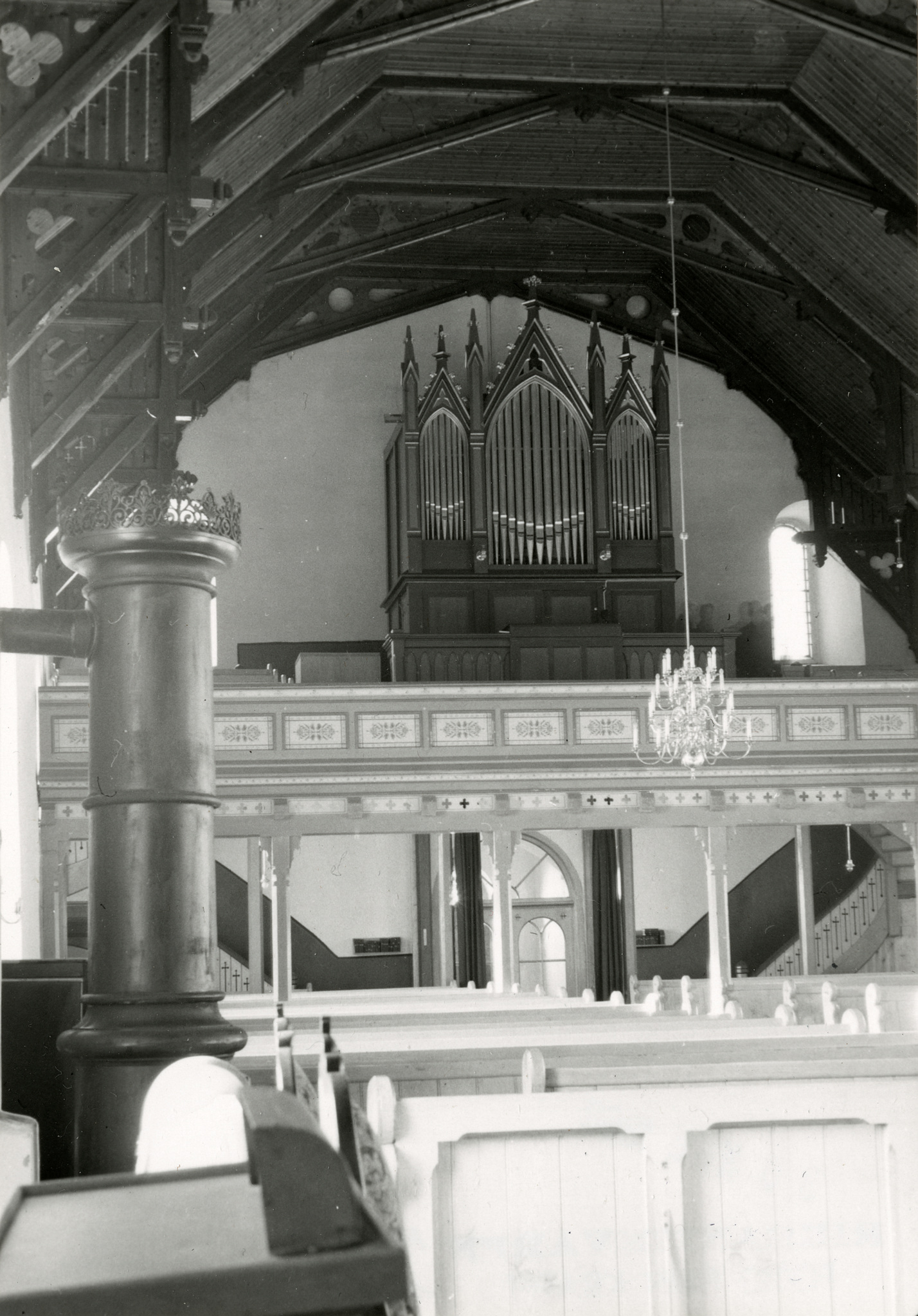

== See also ==
- List of churches in Hamar
