= Nes, Innlandet =

Peninsula in Ringsaker Municipality, Norway

Nes
- Peninsula
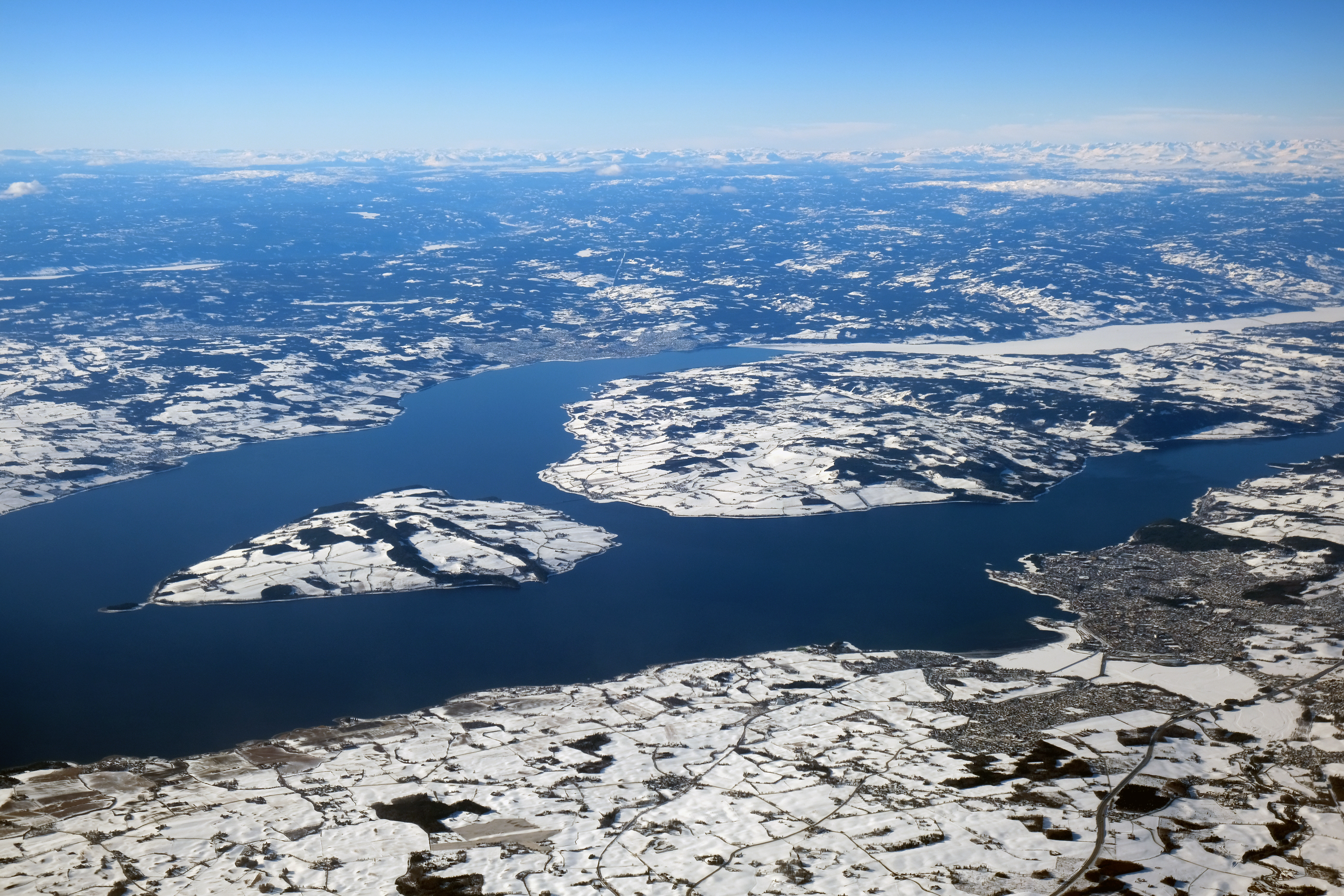
- View of the peninsula and island of Helgøya in lake Mjøsa
- Interactive map of the peninsula
- Coordinates: 60.7818°N 10.93061°E
- Location: Innlandet, Norway
- Offshore water bodies: Mjøsa

Nes is a peninsula in Ringsaker Municipality in Innlandet county, Norway. Some of the larger settlements on the peninsula include Stavsjø and Tingnes. A bridge from the peninsula connects to the island of Helgøya to the south. The peninsula lies east of Gjøvik, south of Lillehammer and Moelv, and west of Hamar and Brumunddal, centrally located between several towns on the lake.

Agriculture is the dominant industry on the peninsula. Fruit growing was previously significant, but has declined, but berry growing is still important. In recent years, various forms of farm tourism and further processing of farm products have expanded the income base on many farms.

== Geography ==
The peninsula lies in Norway's largest lake, Mjøsa. The Furnesfjorden lies to the east and the island of Helgøya is to the south. The bedrock of the peninsula consists of limestone and clay shales of Cambrian-Silurian age, which when weathered gives very fertile soil. The highest parts of the area are forested; the slopes down towards lake Mjøsa are well-cultivated with many large farms such as Baldishol, Grefsheim, Hol, Hovinsholm, and Mengshol.

== Climate ==
Ringsaker Municipality has a humid continental climate (Dfb by the Köppen-Geiger system), with fairly dry and cold winters and pleasant summers. The driest month is February, and the wettest is August. In February 1996, a low of −31.4 °C (−24.5 °F)) was recorded. The all-time high is 33.5 °C (92.3 °F)) from July 2014. The Kise weather station has been recording since April 1951.

Climate data for Kise 1991-2020 (128 m)
Month	Jan	Feb	Mar	Apr	May	Jun	Jul	Aug	Sep	Oct	Nov	Dec	Year
Mean daily maximum °C (°F)	−1.6 (29.1)	−1.2 (29.8)	3.8 (38.8)	9.4 (48.9)	15.1 (59.2)	19.2 (66.6)	21.6 (70.9)	20.3 (68.5)	15.5 (59.9)	8.7 (47.7)	3.3 (37.9)	−0.6 (30.9)	9.5 (49.0)
Daily mean °C (°F)	−4.9 (23.2)	−5.1 (22.8)	−1 (30)	4 (39)	9.4 (48.9)	13.7 (56.7)	16.3 (61.3)	15.2 (59.4)	11 (52)	5.4 (41.7)	0.7 (33.3)	−3.6 (25.5)	5.1 (41.2)
Mean daily minimum °C (°F)	−8.3 (17.1)	−9 (16)	−5.2 (22.6)	−0.3 (31.5)	4.6 (40.3)	8.9 (48.0)	11.5 (52.7)	10.7 (51.3)	7 (45)	2.2 (36.0)	−1.9 (28.6)	−6.8 (19.8)	1.1 (34.1)
Average precipitation mm (inches)	46.6 (1.83)	24.5 (0.96)	26.3 (1.04)	31.4 (1.24)	54.3 (2.14)	67.9 (2.67)	72.3 (2.85)	85.3 (3.36)	57.8 (2.28)	56.5 (2.22)	49.5 (1.95)	35.8 (1.41)	608.2 (23.95)
Source: NOAA-WMO averages 91-2020 Norway

== History ==
Many ancient finds have been made on the peninsula. Nes Church was built on the peninsula during the Middle Ages. The old Baldishol Church once stood on the Baldishol farm on the peninsula. At that site, the oldest preserved textile in Norway was found, the Baldishol Tapestry, probably created in the 13th century.

The Nes peninsula was previously part of Nes Municipality from 1838 until 1964 when it was merged with Ringsaker Municipality.
