= Tingnes =

Village in Ringsaker Municipality, Norway

Tingnes Nes
- Village
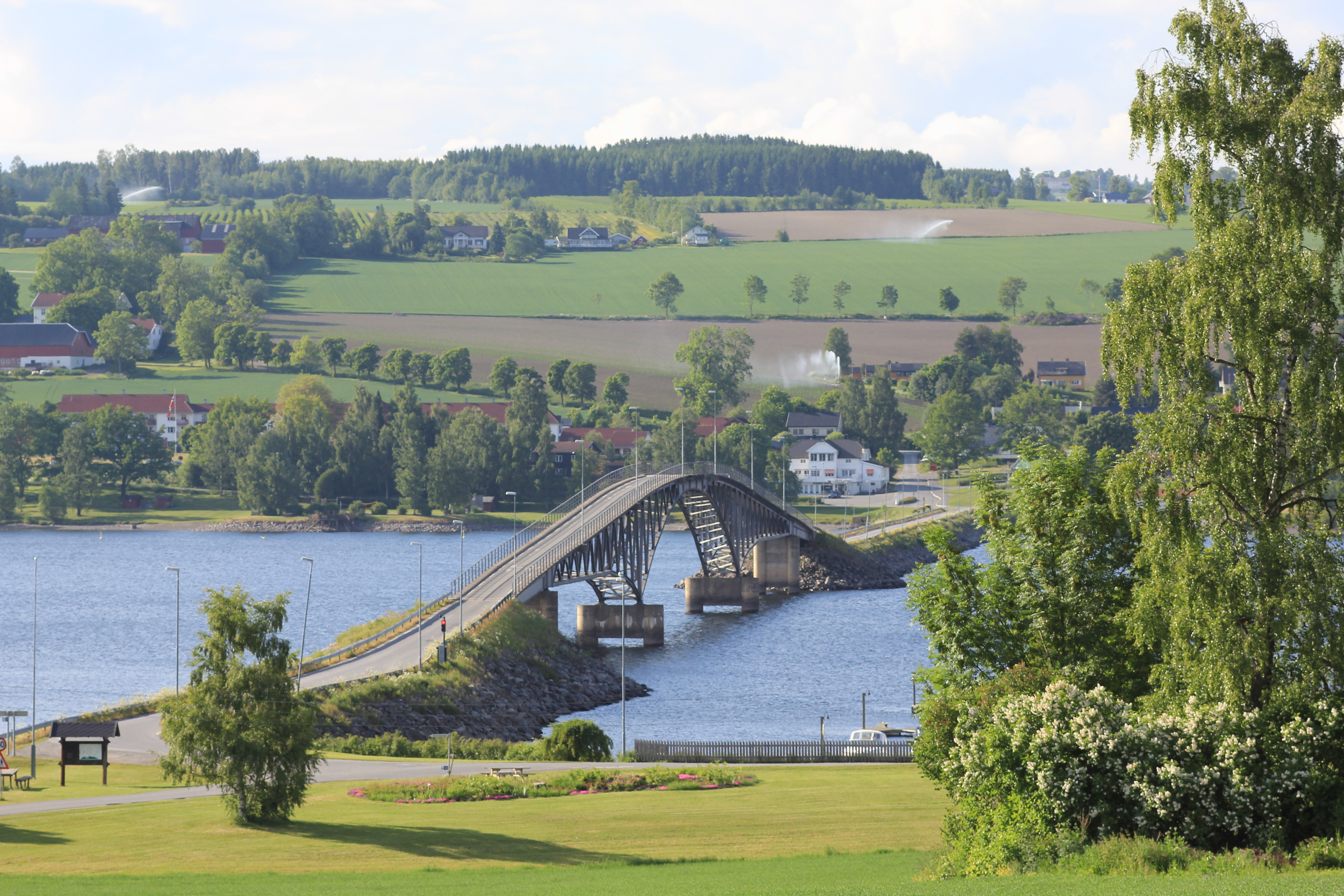
- View of the bridge going from Helgøya (forefront) to Tingnes on the mainland (background)
- Interactive map of Tingnes; Nes
- Location within Innlandet Location within Norway
- Coordinates: 60.7621°N 10.94127°E
- Country: Norway
- Region: Eastern Norway
- County: Innlandet
- District: Hedmarken
- Municipality: Ringsaker Municipality

Area
  - Total: 0.43 km^{2} (0.17 sq mi)
- Elevation: 126 m (413 ft)

Population (2024)
  - Total: 467
  - Density: 1,086/km^{2} (2,810/sq mi)
- Time zone: UTC+01:00 (CET)
  - Summer (DST): UTC+02:00 (CEST)
- Post Code: 2350 Nes på Hedmarken

Tingnes or Nes is a village in Ringsaker Municipality in Innlandet county, Norway. The village is located on the southern end of the Nes peninsula, along the shores of the lake Mjøsa. The village lies about 8 kilometres (5.0 mi) southeast of the village of Stavsjø. There is a bridge from Tingnes to the island of Helgøya to the south. Nes Church is located in the village.

The 0.43-square-kilometre (110-acre) village has a population (2024) of 467 and a population density of 1,086 inhabitants per square kilometre (2,810/sq mi).

== History ==
Tingnes was the administrative centre of the old Nes Municipality which existed from 1838 until 1964.
