= Baldishol Tapestry =

Norwegian medieval tapestry

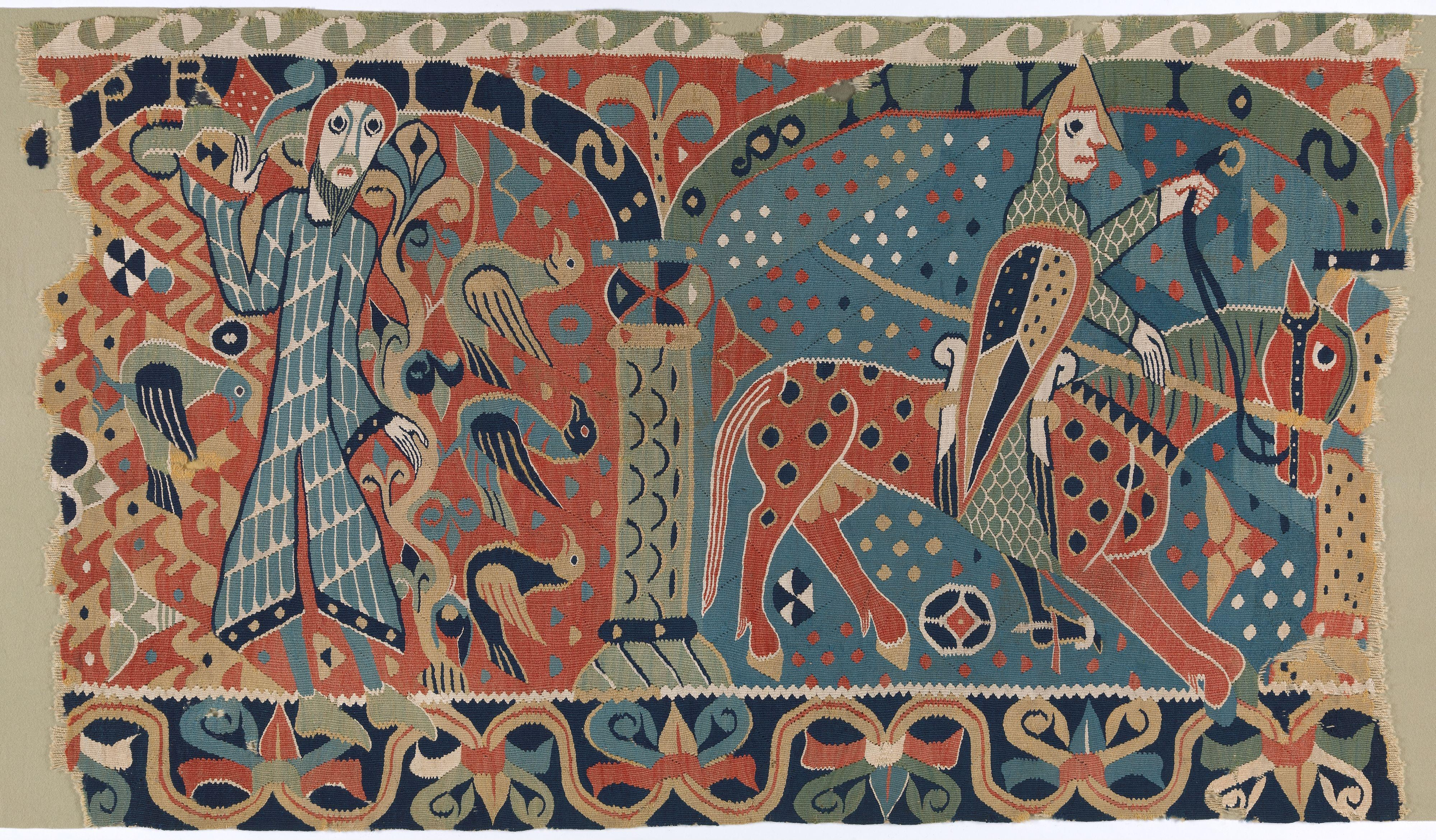
An image of the Baldishol Tapestry in the Oslo National Museum.

The Baldishol Tapestry is one of the oldest known surviving tapestries in Norway, and among the oldest in Europe. It is believed to have been produced between 1040 and 1190. It was discovered in Norway in 1879. It is part of the collection of the National Museum in Oslo. Tapestries of this type were popular in Norway from the Saga Age up until the 1600s.

== Discovery ==
Baldishol Church in Nes in Ringsaker Municipality, Innlandet county, near Lake Mjøsa, was demolished in 1879 to create a larger church. During the demolition, the Baldishol Tapestry was found beneath the floorboards. It was initially mistaken for a woolen rag, rolled up and caked in clay. The Baldishol Church was a wooden structure originally built in 1613.

The tapestry was among materials and objects from the old church that were sold at auction. A local family by the name of Kildal purchased some of the items and stored them at their farm. Louise Kildal visited the farm some years later, found the "rag", and cleaned it, revealing the tapestry. She hung it in her living room and invited the museum director Henrik A. Grosch to view it. He purchased the tapestry from her in 1887 and added it to the collection.

== Construction ==
The tapestry is woven from spælsau wool and linen and the yarn was dyed with vegetable dyes. It measures 118 by 203 centimetres (46 in × 80 in). Through carbon dating, it has been determined that it was created sometime between 1040 and 1190. The weaver is unknown, but it could have been woven in Norway, perhaps in a monastery, or in a small workshop in England or France. The style and depictions are consistent with all of these locations. The tapestry was crafted using the Gobelin technique, and is one of the few surviving examples in Europe, and the only one in Norway.

The tapestry appears to be a fragment, with torn edges. Experts have suggested that it was once part of a larger scene, perhaps depicting all 12 months of the year. It may have been designed to adorn a wall, perhaps in a castle or monastery. However, the loom technology of the time would not have been able to create an unbroken tapestry depicting all 12 months in one continuous piece (such a weaving would be approximately 12 meters long).

The tapestry, in addition to being notable for its age and rarity, is also praised for how well preserved it is. Other examples of this type of yarn from later periods are more faded than this example, which remains vivid.

== Content ==
The tapestry depicts two figures in a Romanesque style. On the left, a bearded man in a tunic stands beneath an archway reading "April". He is surrounded by 4 birds, 3 of them perched in a tree. On the right, a knight in armor sits on a horse, holding a shield and lance. The archway above his head reads "May". The month names are both partially illegible.

The palm-like designs at the bottom of the tapestry began appearing in other art around 1150, suggesting that this tapestry was constructed towards the end of the carbon dating window.

== Impact ==
The National Museum considers the tapestry to be one of the most valuable objects in their collection.

Numerous copies of the tapestry have been made:

- Kristi Seks Meland is believed to have woven a replica that was presented to President Coolidge and Mrs. Coolidge in 1925. 5,000 Norwegian-American women donated to fund the purchase of the gift to commemorate the Norwegian-American Centennial. According to a curator, as of 2022, the replica was in storage in the White House Collection.
- Amalie "Alma" Pettersen Guttersen of St. Paul, Minnesota, wove a copy. It is believed to be one of the reproductions in the collection of the Vesterheim Museum.

Several artists have drawn inspiration from the tapestry:

- A Swedish textile piece drawing inspiration from the tapestry was completed in 1966. It is in the collection of the Vesterheim Norwegian American Museum.
- A textile pattern for a tapestry inspired by the Baldishol Tapestry is in the collection of the Vänersborgs Museum (Sweden).
- Norway House of Twin Cities held a contest to "create contemporary textile pieces in the spirit of the Baldishol Tapestry".

== See also ==
- Oseberg tapestry fragments
- Bayeux tapestry
