= Bernhard Stokke =

Norwegian educationalist and writer

- Born: 24 September 1896; Kvikne, Norway
- Died: 17 January 1979 (aged 82); Oslo, Norway
- Occupations: educationalist, writer
- Writing career
- Notable work: I natt rømmer vi (1932)
- Notable awards: King's Medal of Merit in gold (1966)

Bernhard Stokke (24 September 1896 – 17 January 1979) was a Norwegian educationalist, textbook writer, and children's writer.

== Personal life ==
Stokke was born in Kvikne Municipality, the son of teacher Thomas Stokke and Beret Brobak Tronsaune. He married Johanna Aarvold in 1920.

== Career ==
Stokke combined working as a teacher with part-time studies at the University of Oslo. He graduated in geography, astronomy and chemistry in 1930. While studying he worked as a deputy teacher at various primary schools, and also at the institution Toftes Gave. From 1927 he was assigned a permanent position at Tåsen primary school in Aker. From 1939 to 1947 he served as headmaster of Bryn primary school in Asker, and was later headmaster of Tåsen primary school until his retirement in 1969. As textbook writer he mainly focused on the subjects of History and Geography. His textbook Folket vårt gjennom tidene from 1940 was the most widely used history book in Norwegian primary school in the 1940s. He was responsible for the 1936 edition of C. W. L. Horn's classical textbook Geografi for folkeskolen, and his geography textbook Folkeskolens geografi was published in 1948. He wrote a total of twelve children's books, the first was Blandt olme okser from 1931. His book I natt rømmer vi from 1932, about two boys fleeing from a school institution for "bad boys", won a prize for "Best book for boys", and became a bestseller. The book was followed by three other books about the same characters, between 1933 and 1936. Later books are Bjørneklo and De hjemløse ryttere, both from 1938, Dag fra skogene from 1941, Geir den fredlause from 1944, Nils og Fredrik from 1946 and Langs farefulle veier from 1972.
