= Helgøya Church =

Church in Innlandet, Norway

- Helgøya kirke
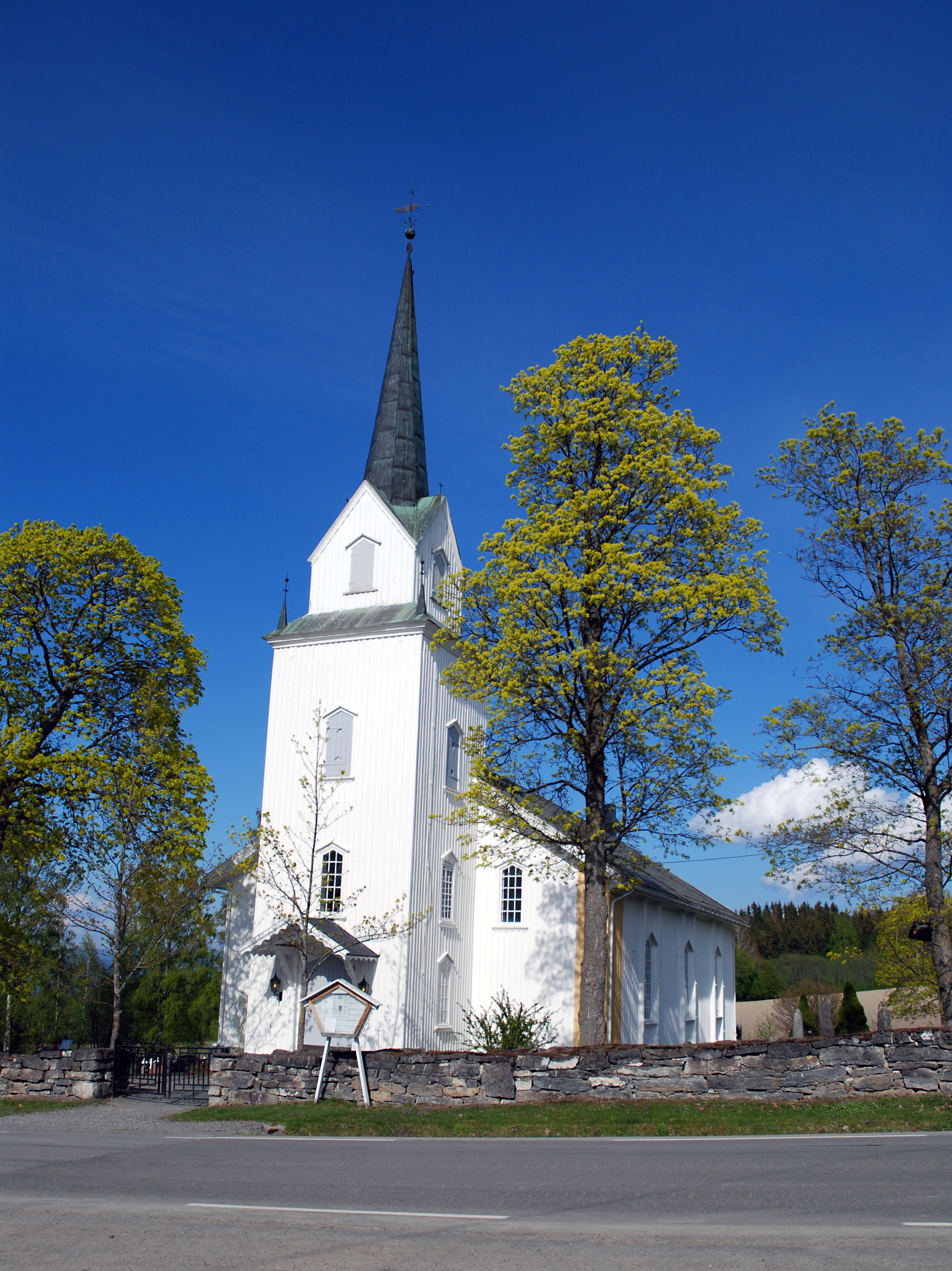
- View of the church
- Helgøya Church
- 60°44′41″N 10°57′31″E
- Location: Ringsaker Municipality, Innlandet
- Country: Norway
- Denomination: Church of Norway
- Churchmanship: Evangelical Lutheran

History
- Status: Parish church
- Founded: 1870
- Consecrated: 7 December 1870

Architecture
- Functional status: Active
- Architect: Jacob Wilhelm Nordan
- Architectural type: Long church
- Completed: 1870 (156 years ago)

Specifications
- Capacity: 200
- Materials: Wood

Administration
- Diocese: Hamar bispedømme
- Deanery: Ringsaker prosti
- Parish: Nes
- Norwegian Cultural Heritage Site
- Type: Church
- Status: Not protected
- ID: 84532

Helgøya Church (Norwegian: Helgøya kirke) is a parish church of the Church of Norway in Ringsaker Municipality in Innlandet county, Norway. It is located on the island of Helgøya. It is one of the churches for the Nes parish which is part of the Ringsaker prosti (deanery) in the Diocese of Hamar. The white, wooden church was built in a long church design in 1870 using plans drawn up by the architect Jacob Wilhelm Nordan. The church seats about 200 people.

== History ==
In the 1850s, plans were made for a new church on the island of Helgøya. The new church would be an annex to the Nes Church parish. In 1868, permission was granted to build the new church on the Svennerud farm. Of two competing drawings, the parish chose the design by Jacob Wilhelm Nordan. The lead builder was Ole Stensrud from Vang Municipality. The new church was to be a half-timbered long church in the Swiss chalet style with about 200 seats. The new building was consecrated on 7 December 1870.

== Media gallery ==
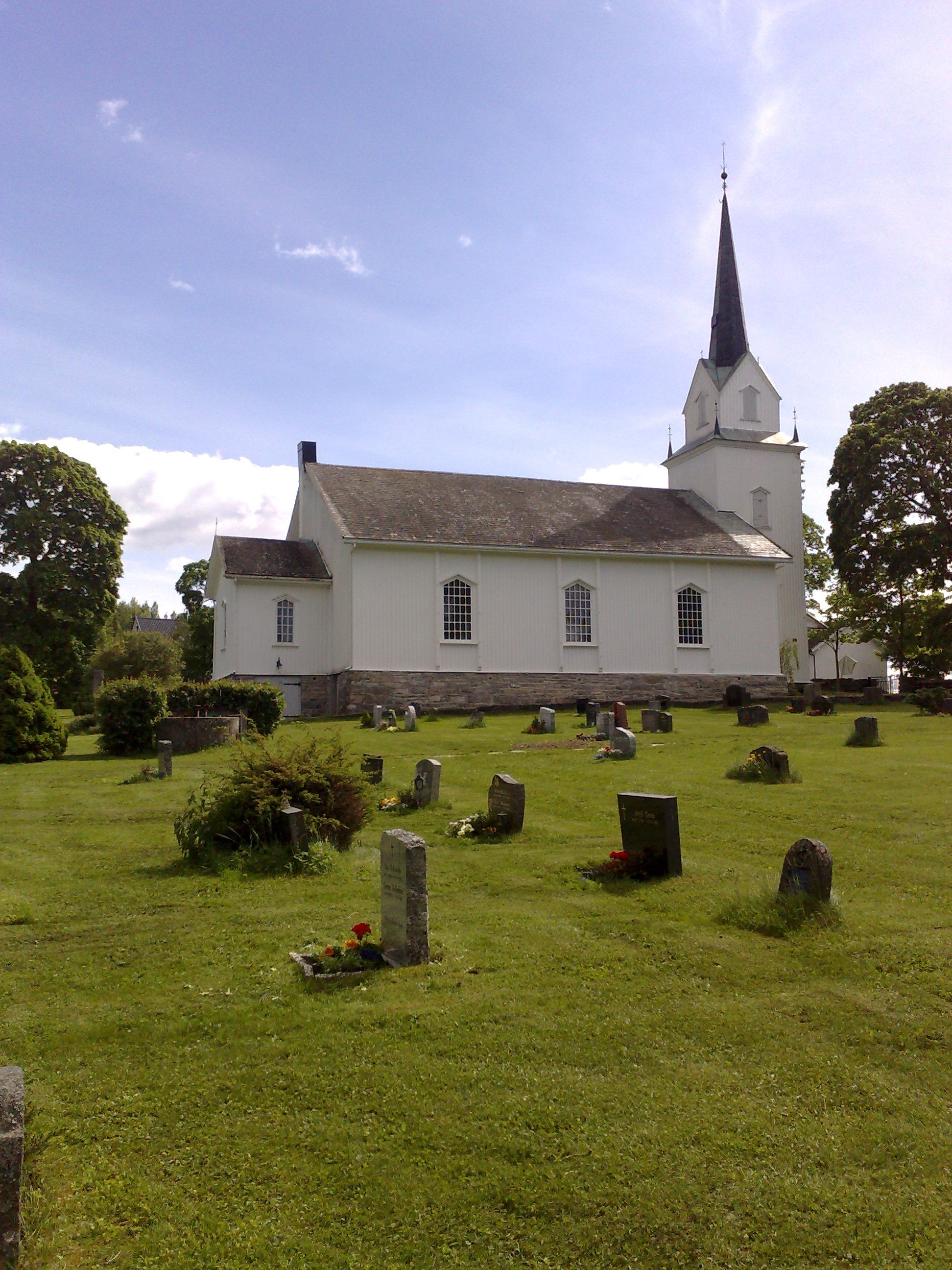
View of the church (2009)

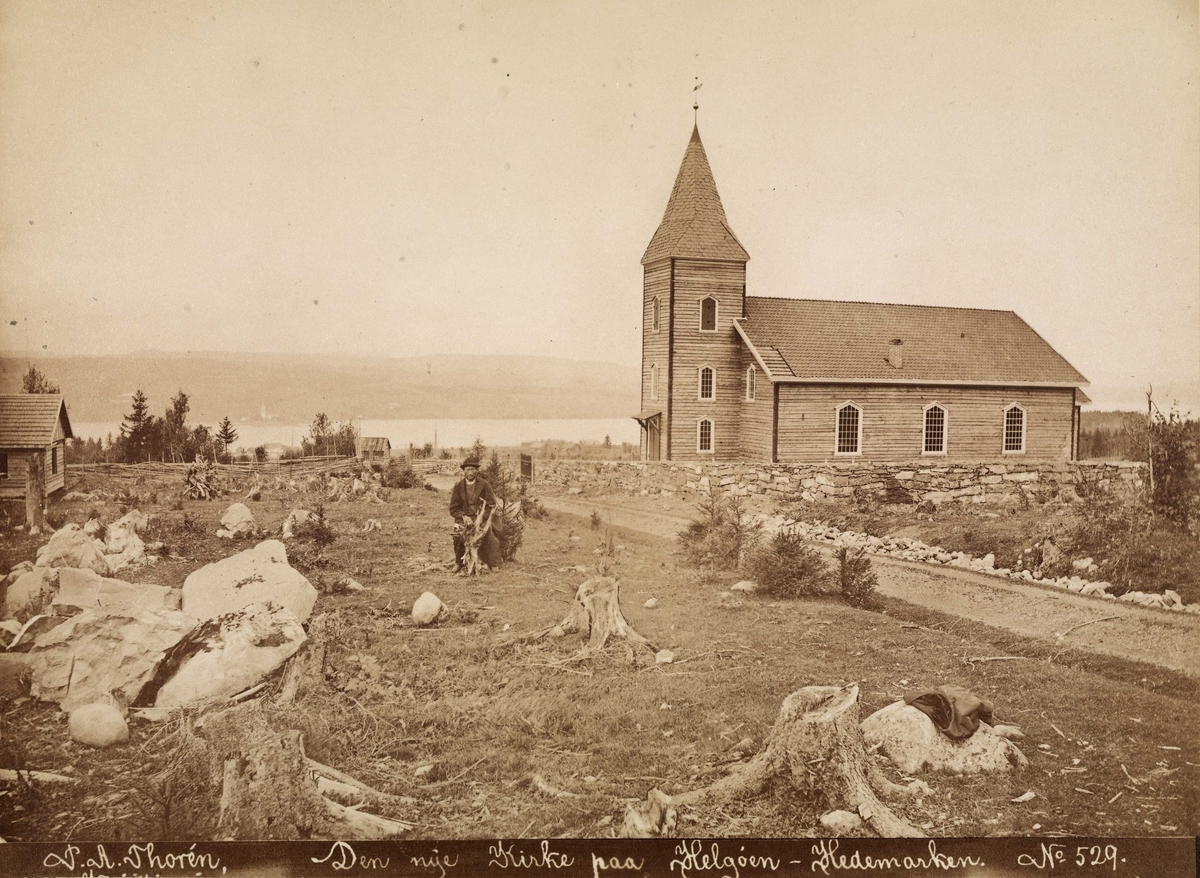
View of the church (c. 1870)

== See also ==
- List of churches in Hamar
