= Stavsjø =

Village in Ringsaker Municipality, Norway

- Village
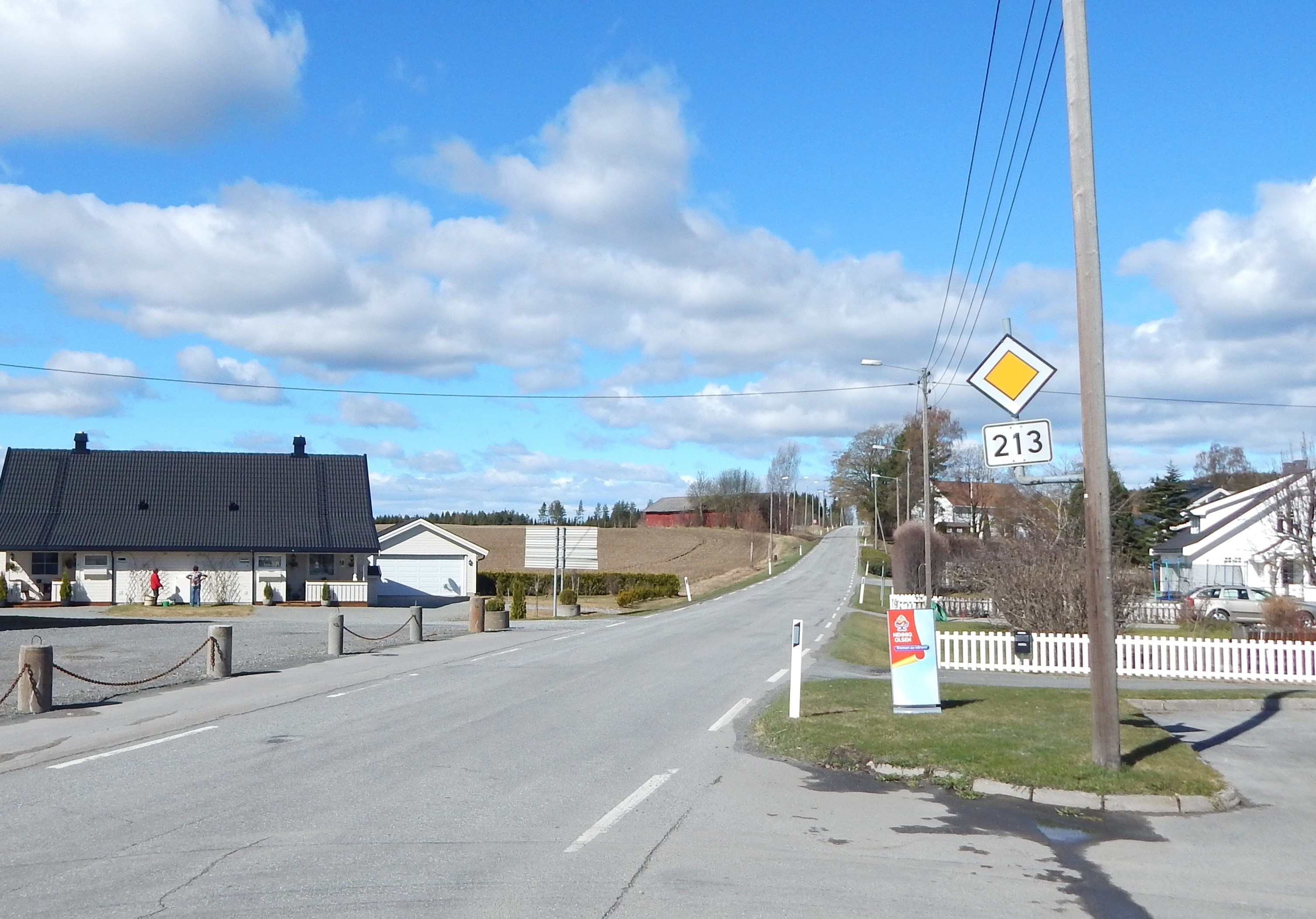
- View of the village
- Interactive map of Stavsjø
- Location within Innlandet Location within Norway
- Coordinates: 60.80568°N 10.83876°E
- Country: Norway
- Region: Eastern Norway
- County: Innlandet
- District: Hedmarken
- Municipality: Ringsaker Municipality

Area
  - Total: 0.36 km^{2} (0.14 sq mi)
- Elevation: 295 m (968 ft)

Population (2024)
  - Total: 273
  - Density: 758/km^{2} (1,960/sq mi)
- Time zone: UTC+01:00 (CET)
  - Summer (DST): UTC+02:00 (CEST)
- Post Code: 2353 Stavsjø

Stavsjø is a village in Ringsaker Municipality in Innlandet county, Norway. The village is located on the Nes peninsula, about 7 kilometres (4.3 mi) northwest of the village of Tingnes and about 14 kilometres (8.7 mi) southwest of the town of Brumunddal. Stavsjø Church is located in the village.

The 0.36-square-kilometre (89-acre) village has a population (2024) of 273 and a population density of 758 inhabitants per square kilometre (1,960/sq mi).
