= Toftes Gave =

Orphanage in Norway

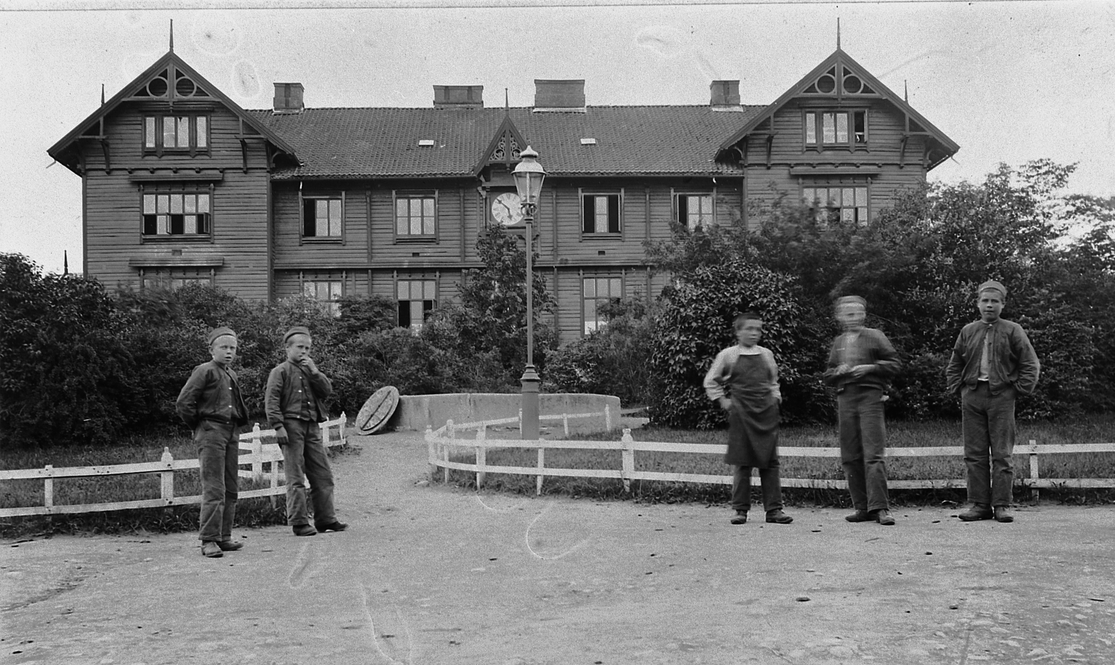
Toftes Gave c.1903

Toftes Gave was a Norwegian orphanage for enforced placement of maladjusted children, or children in deficit of parental care. It was established in 1844 in Munkedamsveien in the city of Christiania. The institution was relocated to Ullensaker Municipality in 1858, and again to the island of Helgøya in Nes Municipality in 1876. The institution closed in 1947.

== History ==
The institution was established by wholesaler and former mayor of Christiania Andreas Tofte in 1844, as a "rescuing institution for morally corrupt children of both sexes". It was originally located at Munkedamsveien 31 in Christiania, at Holmen in Pipervika. In 1847 the institution, including seven buildings, was donated to the municipality of Christiania. The donation was accepted on 9 June 1847, and the institution was henceforth called Toftes Gave (Tofte's gift), named after the donor. In 1858 it was moved to Risebro farm in Ullensaker. In 1876, it was decided to relocate the institution again to Nedre Sund farm on the island of Helgøya in Lake Mjøsa, in Hedmark county. The moving process took place during the autumn of 1877. According to new regulations adopted in 1878, from then on the institution only accepted boys.

While the clientele consisted of 58 boys in 1888, this increased to 151 boys in 1899. The number was reduced to 86 boys in 1912. In 1912 the farm's livestock counted 78 cattle, 14 horses and 65 pigs. After decades of cultivation the farmland consisted of about 900 decares (0.90 km^{2}; 0.35 sq mi) of arable land and 400 decares (0.40 km^{2}; 0.15 sq mi) of productive forests. From this period the institution is known among others through the memoirs of Johannes S. Andersen. He spent four years at Toftes Gave, beginning when he was ten years old, and describes a regime of strict discipline. The children were used as farm workers, under the surveillance of local farmers from Helgøya, and he had the impression they were regarded as inferior to the most primitive of animals. The children adapted to the regime in order to survive. Their instincts of self-preservation also made them learn how to pick locks to gain access to the storage rooms that housed supplies of potatoes or turnips, in order to appease their hunger. Essentially they learned two things at the institution: hatred of all kinds of oppression and tyranny, and solidarity against what he called slave-drivers and executioners.

From 1896, Toftes Gave was run by the national government, until it closed in 1947.

=== Later use ===
Starting in 1951, the location at Helgøya was used by Oslo Municipality as a home for mentally disabled persons. The site's ownership was transferred to Ringsaker Municipality in 1991.
