= Helgøya, Innlandet =

Island in Innlandet, Norway

Helgøya
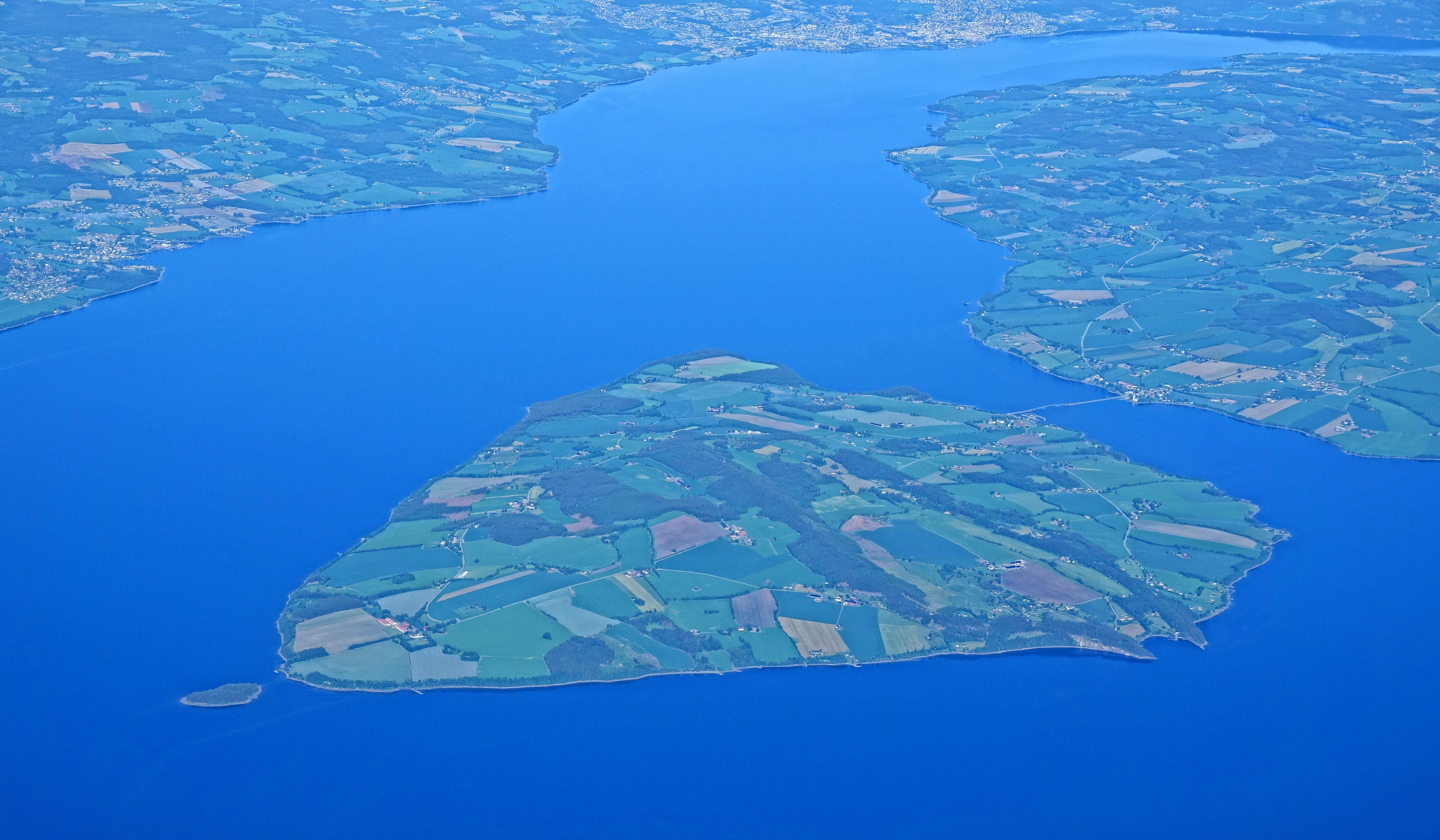
- Aerial shot of Helgøya
- Interactive map of Helgøya

Geography
- Location: Innlandet, Norway
- Coordinates: 60.7363°N 10.9798°E
- Area: 18.3 km^{2} (7.1 sq mi)
- Length: 5.76 km (3.579 mi)
- Width: 4.5 km (2.8 mi)
- Highest elevation: 331 m (1086 ft)
- Highest point: Eksberget

Administration
- Norway
- County: Innlandet
- Municipality: Ringsaker Municipality

Helgøya is an island in lake Mjøsa and the largest freshwater island in Norway. The 18.3-square-kilometre (7.1 sq mi) island is located within Ringsaker Municipality in Innlandet county. The island is located south of the Nes peninsula, and it has been connected to the mainland by the Nessundet Bridge since 1957. The island was formerly a part of the Nes Municipality until 1964.

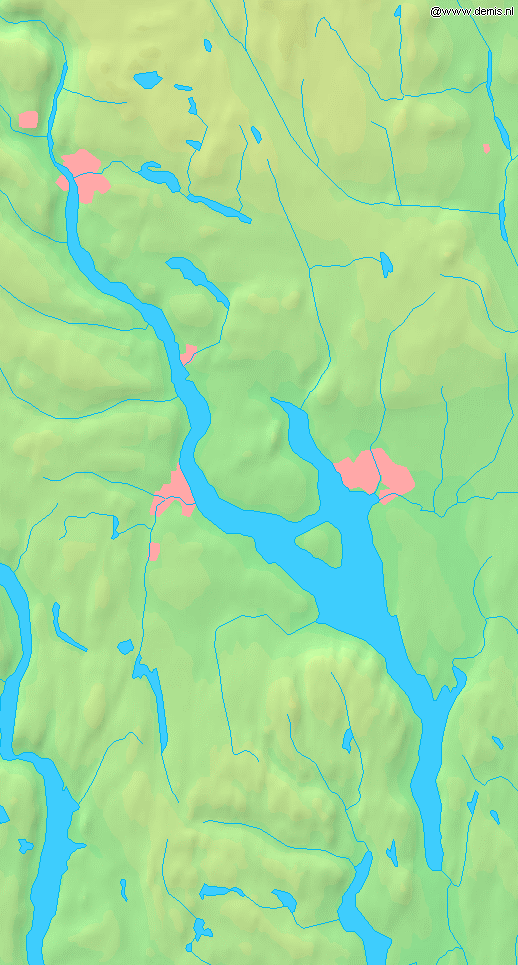
Map of lake Mjøsa and its surrounding towns, with Helgøya in the centre.

The island consists of 32 farms. The most notable of these are the old manor Hovinsholm which had its own church until 1612. Another old farm is Eik (lit. 'oak') which is the source of the name of the tallest hill on the island: Eksberget. Another farm is Høvelsrud with its 17th century gardens. The island is generally rich in traces of medieval history.

Helgøya Church (Norwegian: Helgøya kirke) was built on the island in 1870 and it was consecrated on 7 December 1870. The chapel was built in timber and blockwork in the Gothic Revival style. The church has about 200 seats. The building was restored and partially rebuilt in the 1970s.

== Name ==
The Old Norse forms of the name were Helgøy and Øyin helga, both meaning 'holy island'. The farm name Hovin (Old Norse: Hofvin - later re-named Hovinsholm) on the southern tip of the island is a compound of hof which means "pagan temple (for the Norse gods)" and vin which means "meadow".

== See also ==
- Toftes Gave
- List of islands of Norway
