= Nes Church (Ringsaker) =

Church in Innlandet, Norway

- Nes kirke
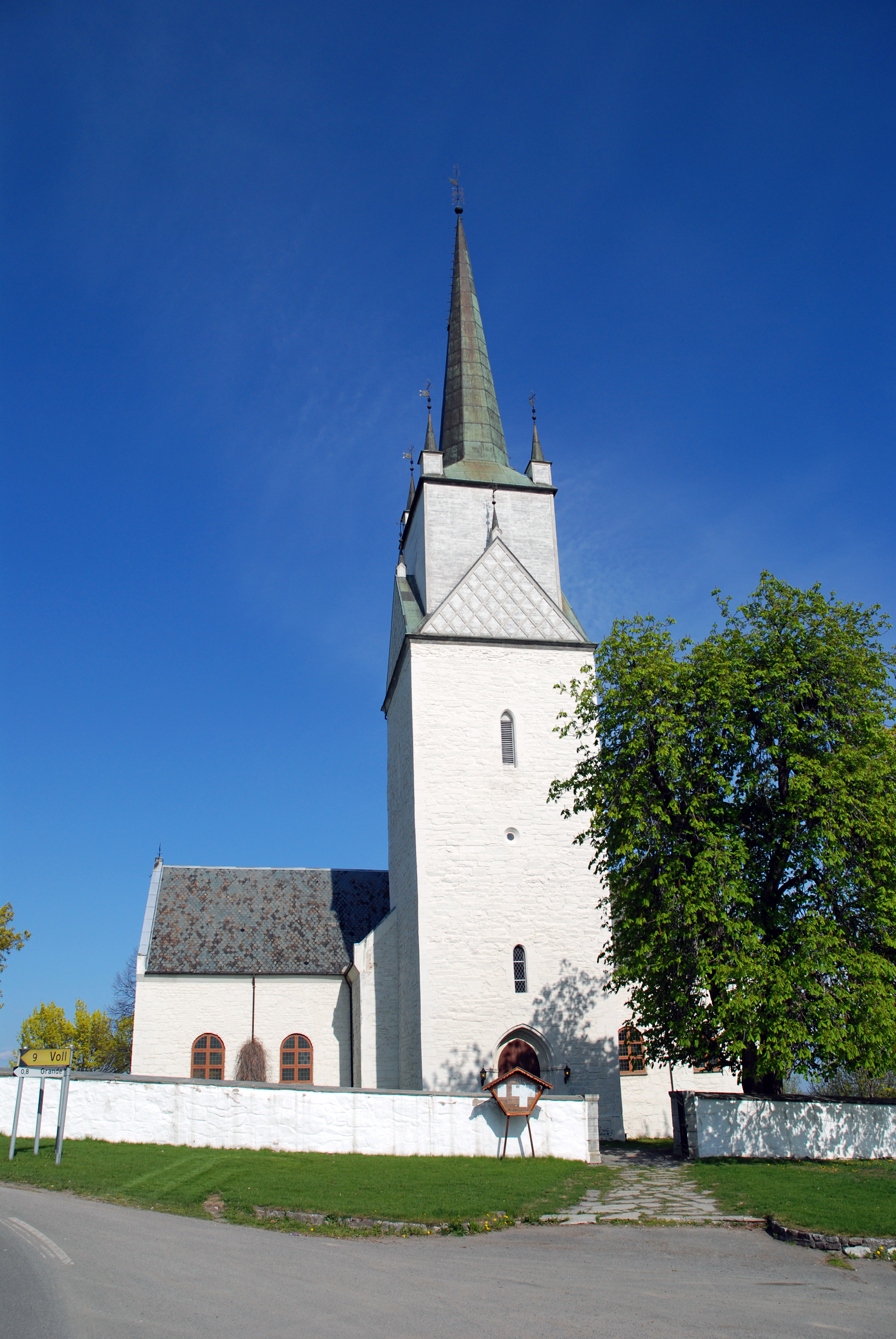
- View of the church
- Nes Church
- 60°45′44″N 10°56′35″E
- Location: Ringsaker Municipality, Innlandet
- Country: Norway
- Denomination: Church of Norway
- Previous denomination: Catholic Church
- Churchmanship: Evangelical Lutheran

History
- Status: Parish church
- Founded: 11th century
- Consecrated: c. 1250

Architecture
- Functional status: Active
- Architectural type: cruciform
- Completed: c. 1250 (776 years ago)

Specifications
- Capacity: 320
- Materials: Stone

Administration
- Diocese: Hamar bispedømme
- Deanery: Ringsaker prosti
- Parish: Nes
- Norwegian Cultural Heritage Site
- Type: Church
- Status: Automatically protected
- ID: 85105

Nes Church (Norwegian: Nes kirke) is a parish church of the Church of Norway in Ringsaker Municipality in Innlandet county, Norway. It is located in the village of Tingnes. It is one of the churches for the Nes parish which is part of the Ringsaker prosti (deanery) in the Diocese of Hamar. The white, stone church was built in a cruciform design around the year 1250 using plans drawn up by an unknown architect. The church seats about 320 people.

== History ==
The first church in Nes was likely a wooden stave church that was built during the 11th century. Around the year 1250, the old wooden church was torn down and replaced with a new stone church on the same site. It is built of limestone in a kind of Anglo-Norman Gothic style and it was originally built as a long church. Some of the interior furnishings were reused in the new church. For example, the choir portal has stylistic features that date it to the late 1000s or early 1100s. Originally, the church did not have a tower, but a wooden tower was added later. Around the year 1600, there was a fire (possibly from lightning) that burned the tower. A new tower was constructed in 1608 (the date is part of the metal wind vane on top). There was another fire in 1663.

By the 1690s, the church was deemed to be too small, so in 1697, the north wall of the nave was opened up and a new transept wing was built to the north to add more seating in the church. Then in 1704, the south wall of the nave was also opened and a new transept wing was built to the south, creating a cruciform floor plan. Also that year, a new stone sacristy with a vaulted ceiling was built on the south side of the choir. The church has an iron-reinforced sacristy door with an inscription, and the rings on main door date from the Middle Ages. In 1770, the church was struck by lightning and part of the church caught fire.

In 1789, the great Storofsen flood struck the church. It is said that people rowed their boats over the cemetery walls to get to communion at the church during this flood. There are also stories that a bridge and groom were married in a boat at the church during this time as well. One of the church workers drowned in the basement of the church when the floodwaters rose as well.

In 1814, this church served as an election church (Norwegian: valgkirke). Together with more than 300 other parish churches across Norway, it was a polling station for elections to the 1814 Norwegian Constituent Assembly which wrote the Constitution of Norway. This was Norway's first national elections. Each church parish was a constituency that elected people called "electors" who later met together in each county to elect the representatives for the assembly that was to meet at Eidsvoll Manor later that year.

In 1888, there was a big fire in the church. The medieval altarpiece and pulpit as well as the more modern organ were all lost in the fire, but church silver and some other furniture were saved. The church was rebuilt in neo-Gothic style after drawings by the Swedish painter Carl-Erik Törner. Also at this time, Gothic windows were inserted everywhere. The church was extensively restored in 1961–1964 according to plans by Bjarne Hvoslef. Many of the pointed arched Gothic windows were replaced with round arched ones, except for in the sacristy, the choir's east wall, and the tower. The interior was also redone along with a new ceiling. A second floor organ gallery was built in the northern cross-arm.

== Media gallery ==
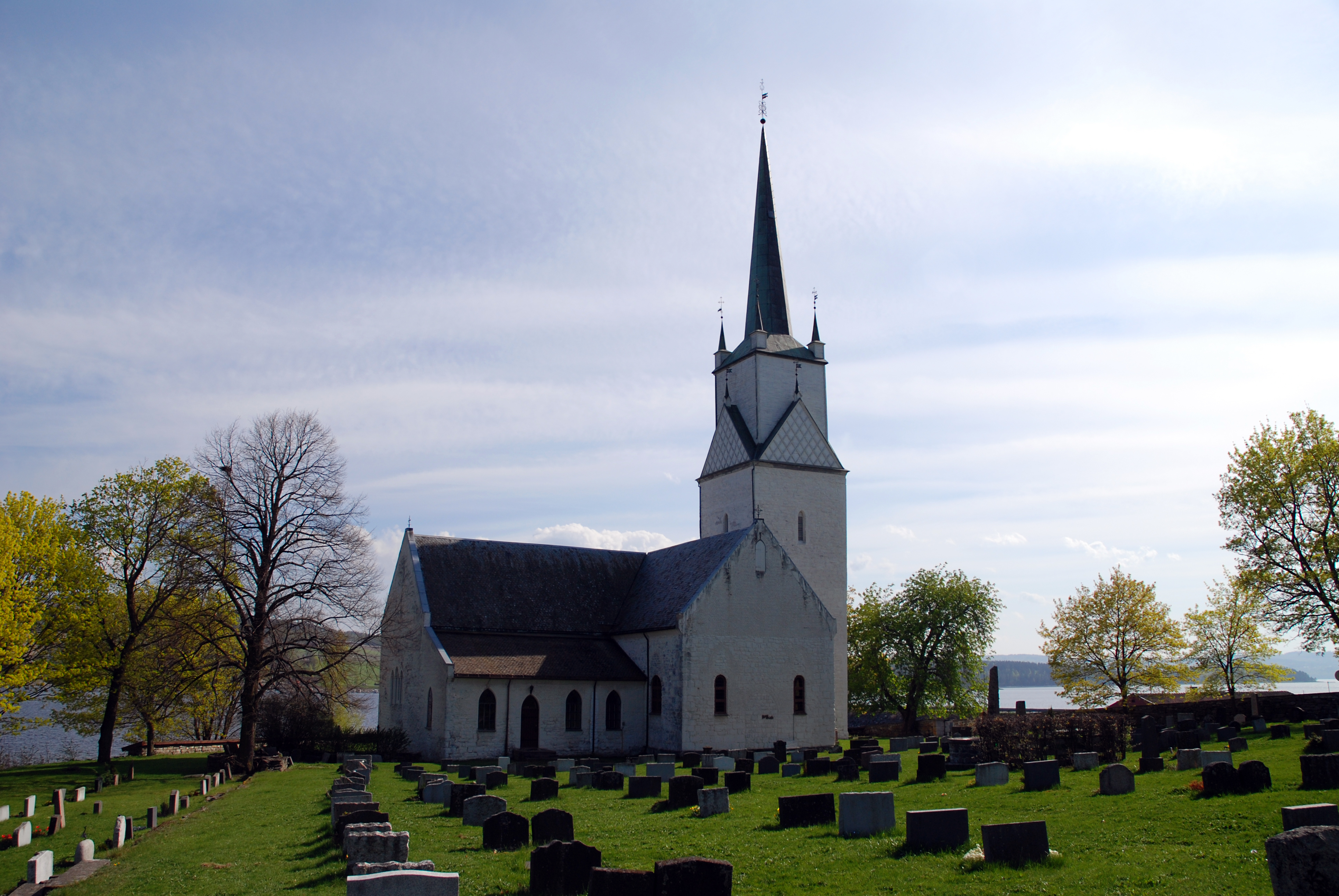

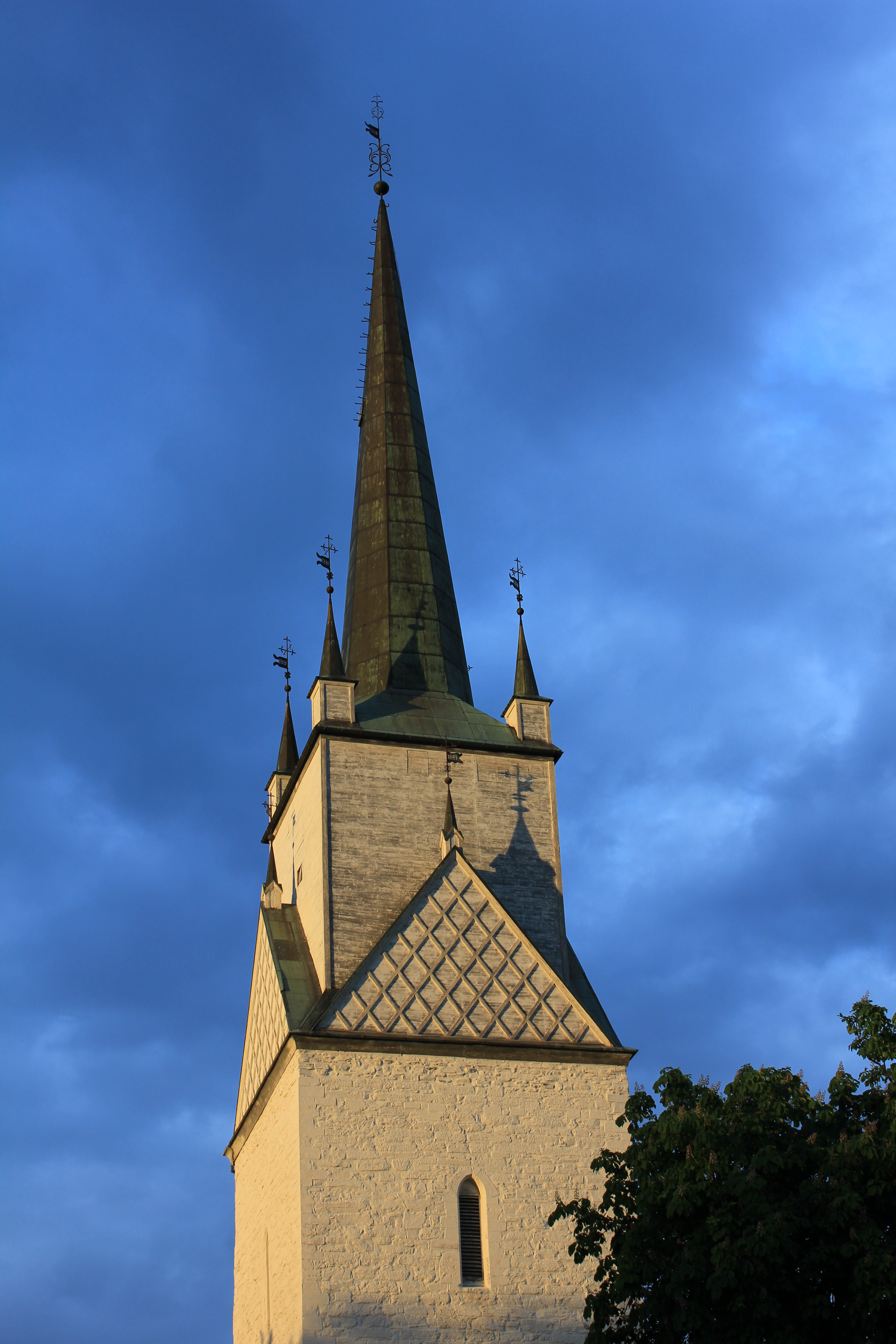

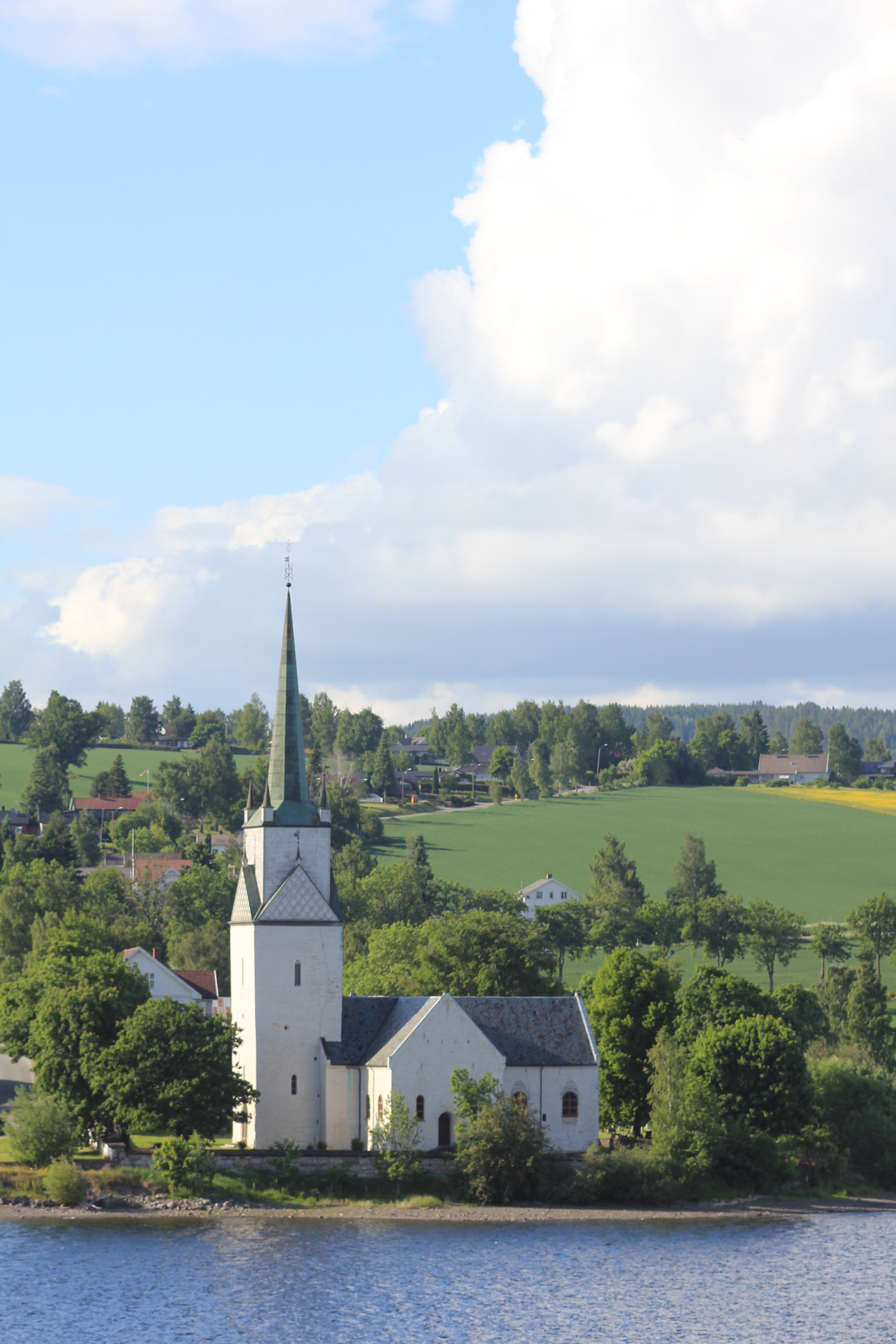

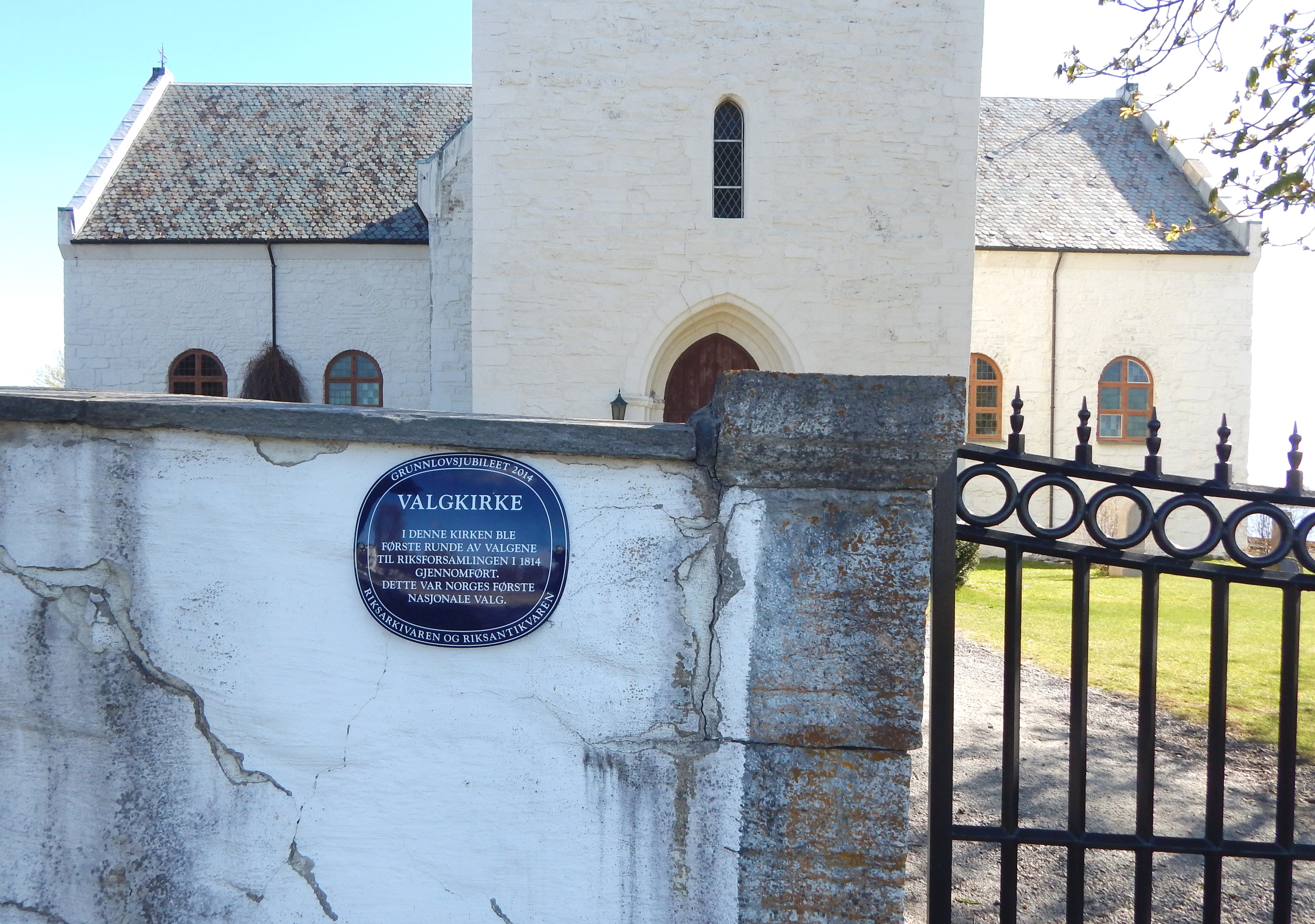

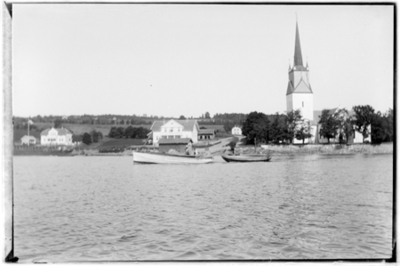

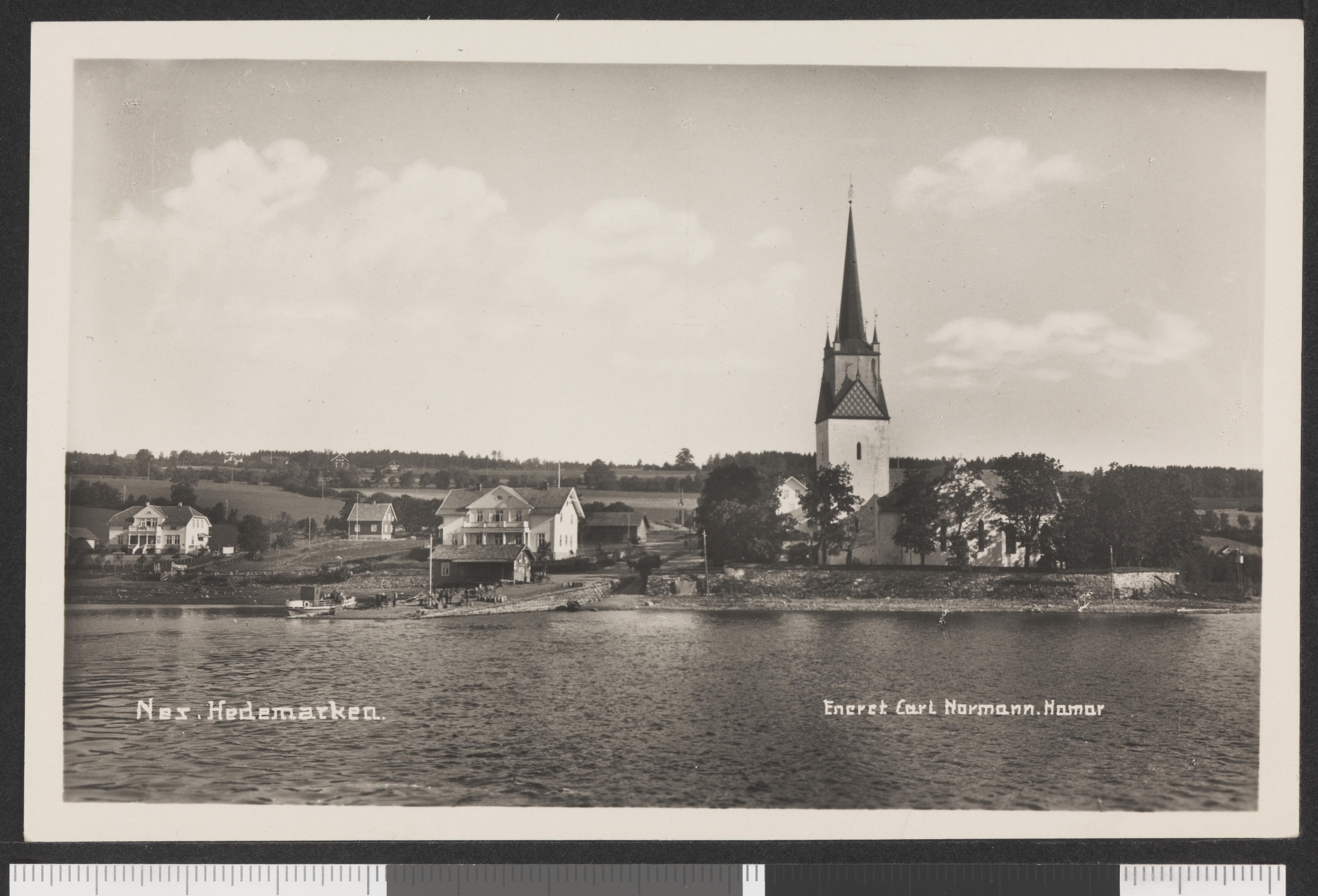

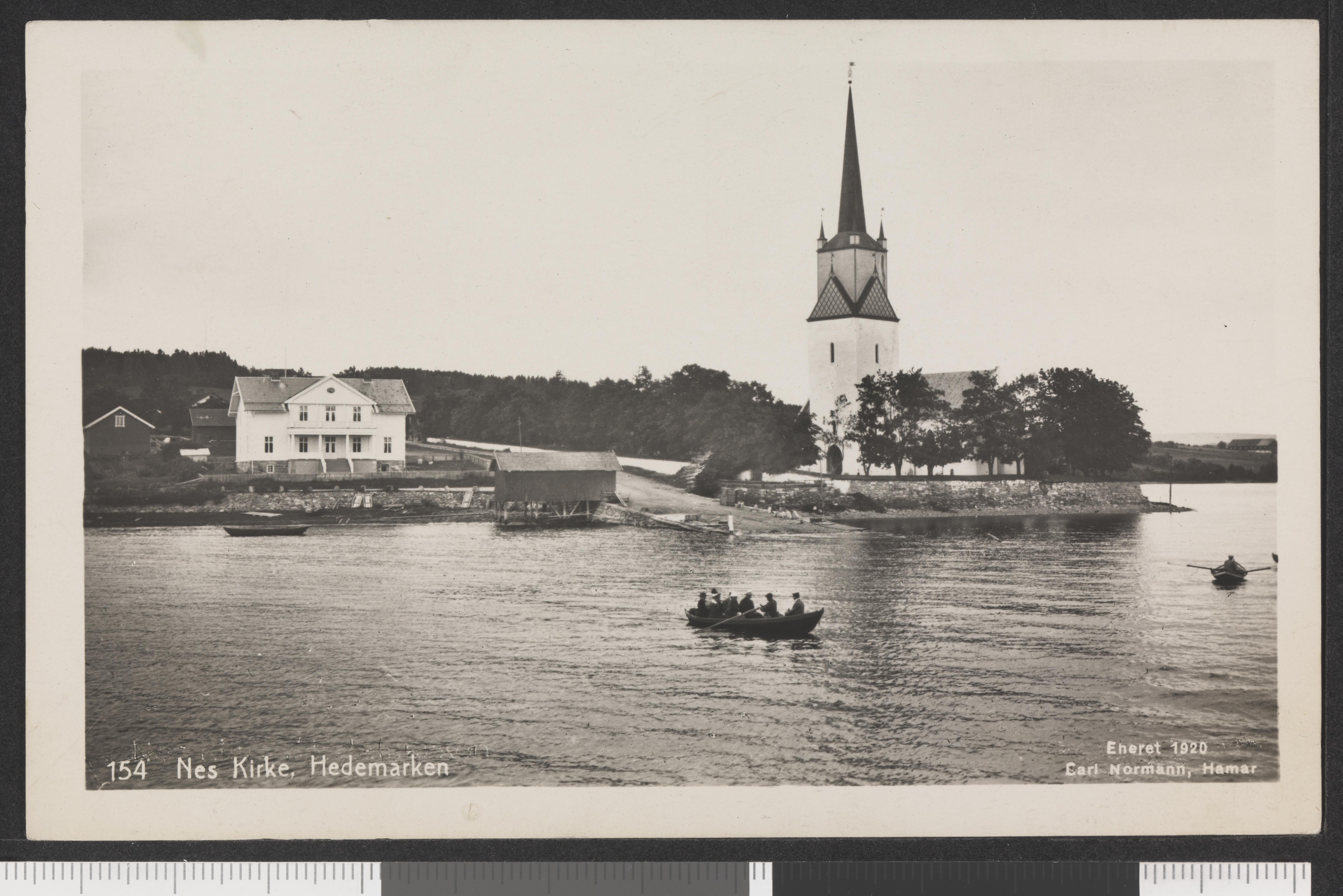

== See also ==
- List of churches in Hamar
