= Mjøsa =

Largest lake in Norway

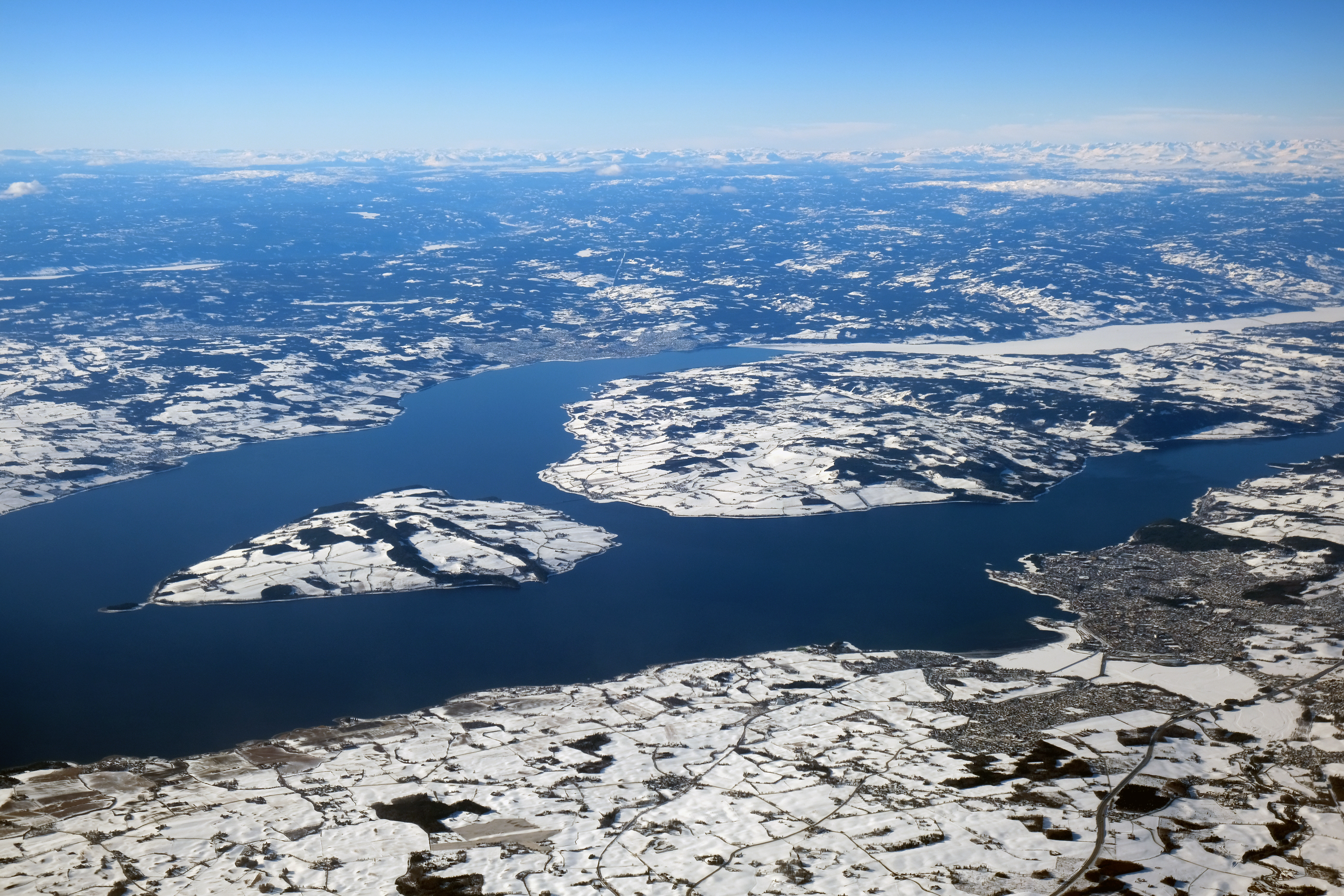
- Aerial view
- Interactive map of the lake
- Location: Innlandet and Akershus
- Coordinates: 60°40′N 11°00′E
- Type: glacial fjord lake
- Primary inflows: Gudbrandsdalslågen, Brumunda, Flagstadelva, Hunnselva, Lenaelva, Mesna, Moelva, Stokkeelva, Svartelva, Vikselva and Vismunda
- Primary outflows: Vorma
- Catchment area: 16,563.89 km^{2} (6,395.35 sq mi)
- Basin countries: Norway
- Max. length: 117 km (73 mi)
- Max. width: 9 km (5.6 mi)
- Surface area: 369.48 km^{2} (142.66 sq mi)
- Average depth: 150–153 m (492–502 ft)
- Max. depth: 453 m (1,486 ft)
- Water volume: 56.24 km^{3} (13.49 cu mi)
- Shore length^{1}: 341.11 km (211.96 mi)
- Surface elevation: 119–123 m (390–404 ft)
- Islands: Helgøya
- Settlements: Hamar, Gjøvik, Lillehammer
- References: NVE
- ^{1} Shore length is not a well-defined measure.

Mjøsa is the largest lake in Norway and the fourth deepest in Norway and Europe. It is located in the southern part of Norway, about 100 kilometres (62 mi) north of the city of Oslo. Its main tributary is the river Gudbrandsdalslågen flowing in from the north; the only distributary is the river Vorma in the south. Inflows would theoretically need 5.6 years to fill the lake. With an average depth of about 150 metres (490 ft), most of the lake's volume is under sea level. The average outflow of the lake (measured from 1931 to 1982) is 316 cubic metres per second (11,200 cu ft/s) which is about 9,959,000,000 cubic metres per year (1.1145×10^{10} cu ft/Ms). Mjøsa contains about 56.2 km^{3} (13.5 cu mi) of water compared to the 14.8 km^{3} (3.6 cu mi) in the lake Røssvatnet, the second largest lake by volume in Norway.

With a surface elevation of about 121 metres (397 ft), the depth of Mjøsa means that the deepest part of the basin is located approximately 332 metres (1,089 ft) below sea level. This is lower than the deepest point of the sea inlet of Kattegat and the lower than the vast majority of Skagerrak off Norway's south coast. Mjøsa retains a larger average depth than both the North Sea and Baltic Sea respectively.

Thomas Robert Malthus traveled through Norway in 1799 and his diaries from the trip includes a description of Mjøsa. Malthus wrote that Mjøsa appears as both lake and river because the shores are defined by mountains and where the valley becomes wider the water fills the space. Below Minde (Minnesund) the lake only appears like a river and is called Vorma on the map, according to Malthus.

== Location ==
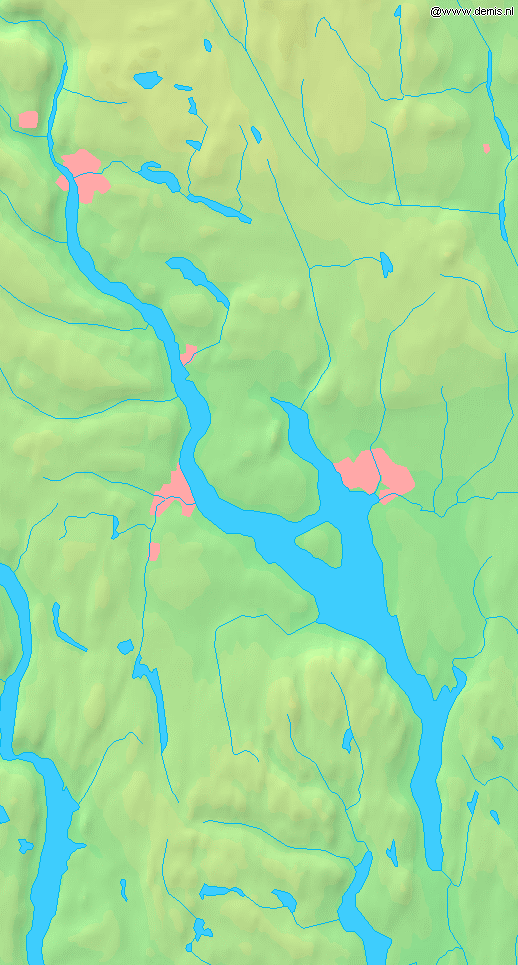
Map with cities Lillehammer (North), Gjøvik (West), and Hamar (East)

From its southernmost point at Minnesund in Eidsvoll Municipality to its northernmost point in Lillehammer Municipality, it is 117 kilometres (73 mi) long. At its widest, near the town of Hamar, it is 9 kilometres (5.6 mi) wide. It is 369 square kilometres (142 sq mi) in area and its volume is estimated at 56 km^{3} (13 cu mi); normally its surface is about 121–123 m (397–404 ft) above sea level, and its greatest depth is 453 m (1,486 ft). Its total coastline is estimated at 341 km (212 mi), of which 30% is built up. Dams built on the distributary of Vorma in 1858, 1911, 1947, and 1965 raised the level by approximately 3.6 m (12 ft) in total. During the 19th and 20th centuries, there have been 20 floods recorded that added at least 7 m (23 ft) to the level of the lake which caused flooding. Several of these floods inundated the city of Hamar.

The towns of Hamar, Gjøvik, and Lillehammer were founded along the shores of the lake. Before the construction of railways past the lake, it was an important transport route. Today, aside from minor leisure boating and the steamship Skibladner, there is no water traffic on the lake. Most of its shores are dominated by rolling agricultural areas, among them some of the most fertile grainlands in Norway. The main train line, the Dovre Line between Oslo and Trondheim, goes along its eastern shore, making stops at Hamar Station and Lillehammer Station. From the south, the European route E6 highway runs along the eastern shore of the lake until the Mjøsa Bridge connects Moelv on the east with Biri on the west.

== Mjøskastellet ==
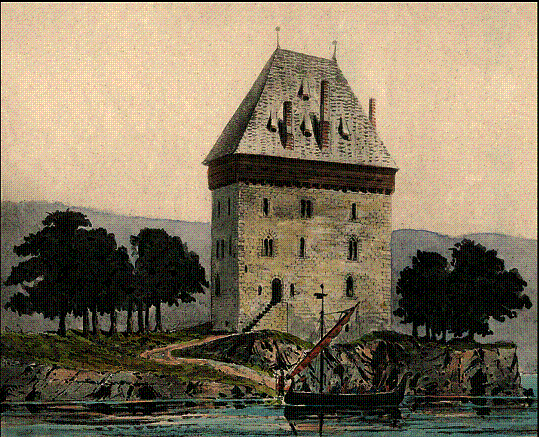
Drawing of Mjøstkastellet as imagined by Peter Andreas Blix

The largest and only island in the lake is Helgøya. Except for Helgøya, Mjøsa only contains small islets. The most interesting of these is Steinsholmen, which holds the ruins of Mjøskastellet, a medieval citadel dating from the 13th century. Established by King Haakon IV of Norway, it was first mentioned historically in a letter dated 1234. Peter Andreas Blix documented the site and made drawings in 1897. Hedmark Museum has a future archaeological plan for the site.

== Fish ==
Lake Mjøsa has 20 species of fish. Among the most common are pike, European perch, common roach, greyling, and the hundertrout, a brown trout which can reach a weight more than 20 kilograms (44 lb). Another common species is the European smelt, which is the most important bait fish for the predators. Historically, the most economically significant species is the lågsild (European cisco).

== Source of drinking water ==
Several municipal and urban areas use the lake as their source of drinking water.

- Hamar / Ottestad – Hias IKS has responsibility for the waterworks and waste water treatment plants in Hamar Municipality, Stange Municipality, and Løten Municipality.
- Lillehammer Municipality – Operates waterworks at Korgen. Contracts have been signed for a new flood-proof waterworks to be built in Hovemoen.
- Gjøvik Municipality – WWTP run from Rambekk Renseanlegg
- Østre Toten Municipality – Kapp / Skreia
- Brumunddal – Biri / Moelv

== Name ==
The lake is named "Mjøsa" (Old Norse: Mjǫrs / Proto-Norse *Merso) and this name must be very old. The meaning is possibly "the bright/shiny one". This is based on the theory that the first element *mer- is related to the English word mere which now means "just" or "only", but formerly also meant "clear" or "bright". The second element -so would be a suffix.. However, mere in this sense came into use in Middle English from Latin via French rather than from its Germanic Old English roots, making this meaning unlikely.

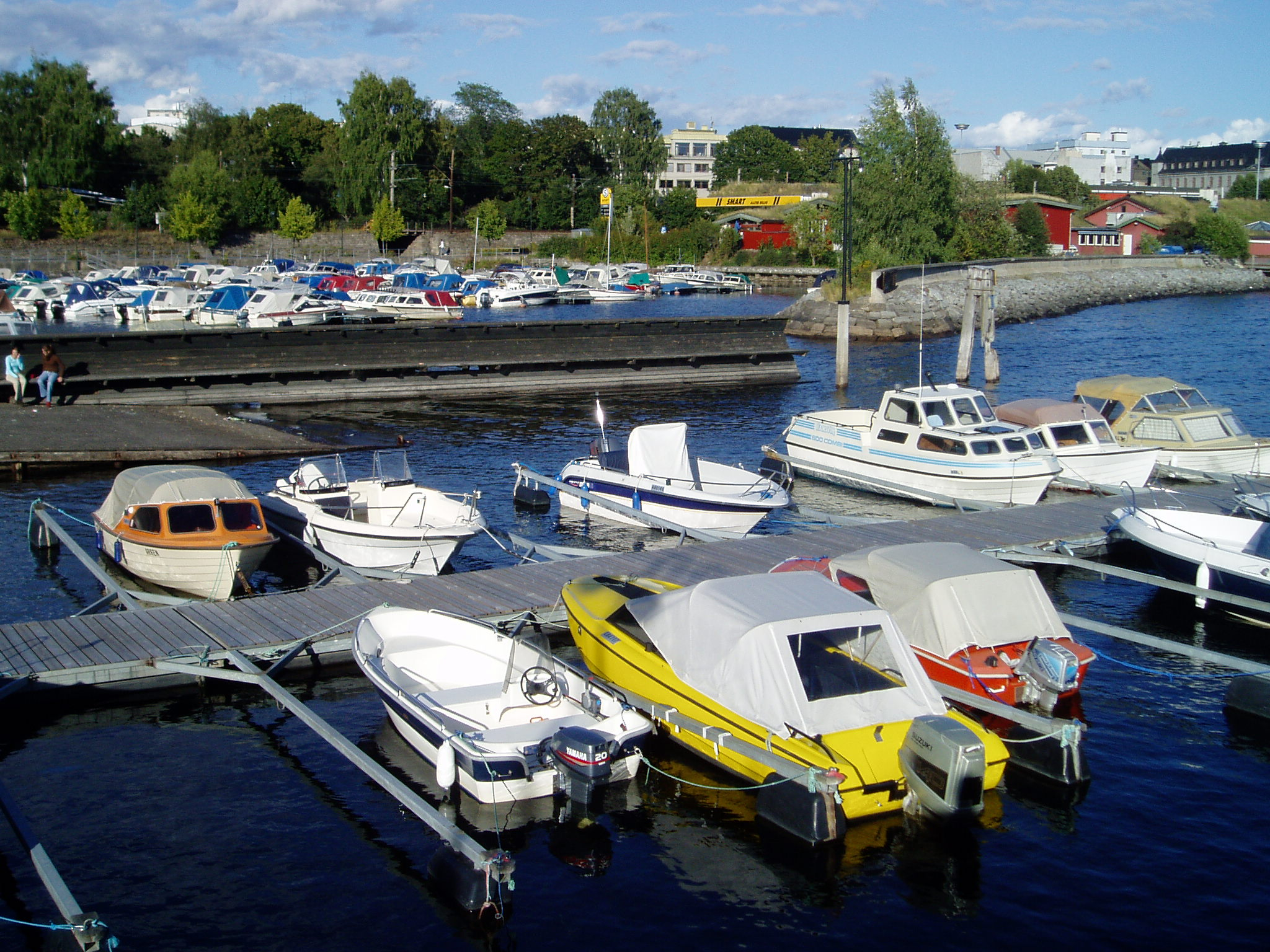
The lake seen from the harbor in Hamar

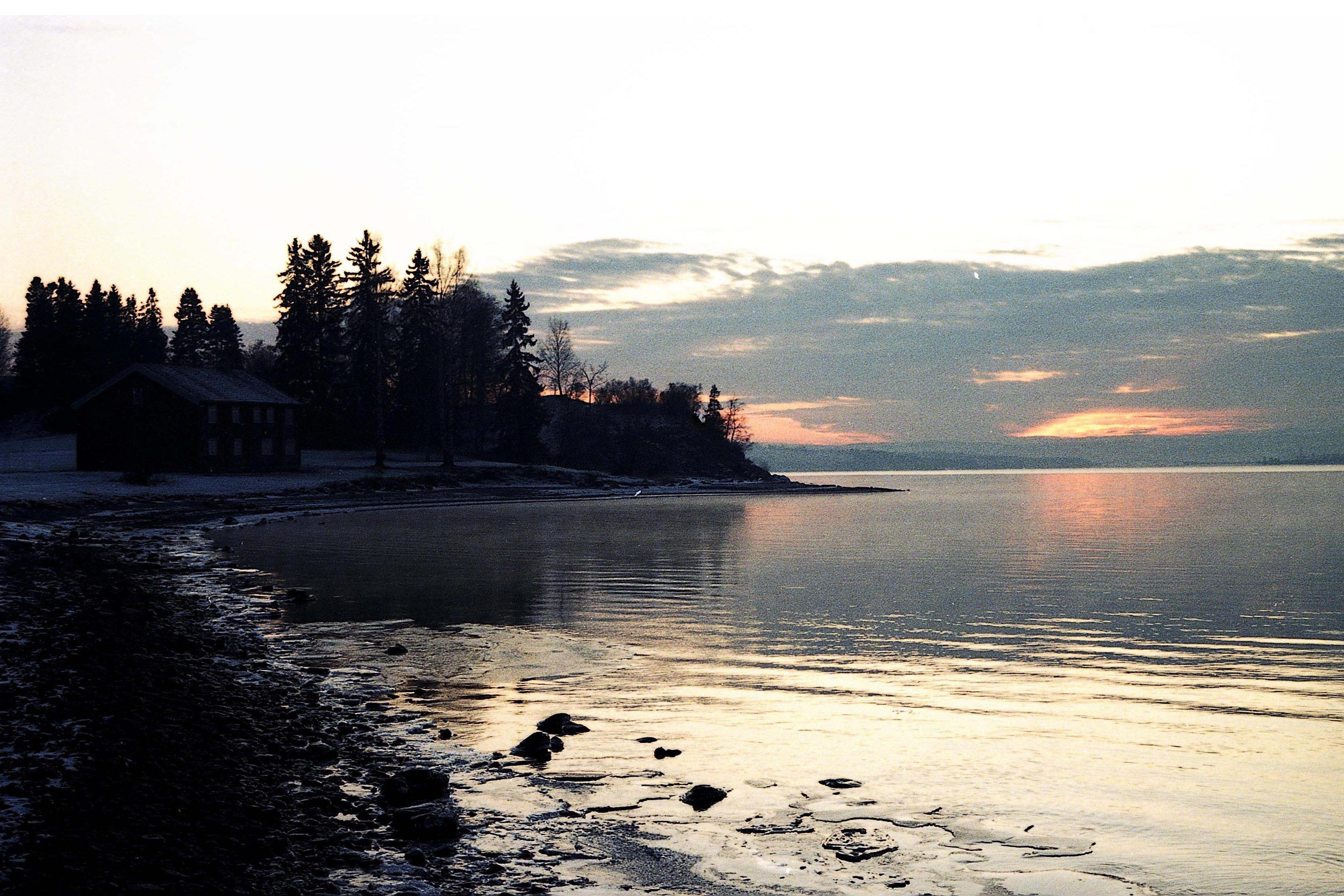
The landmark Geiteryggen looking south from Hamar

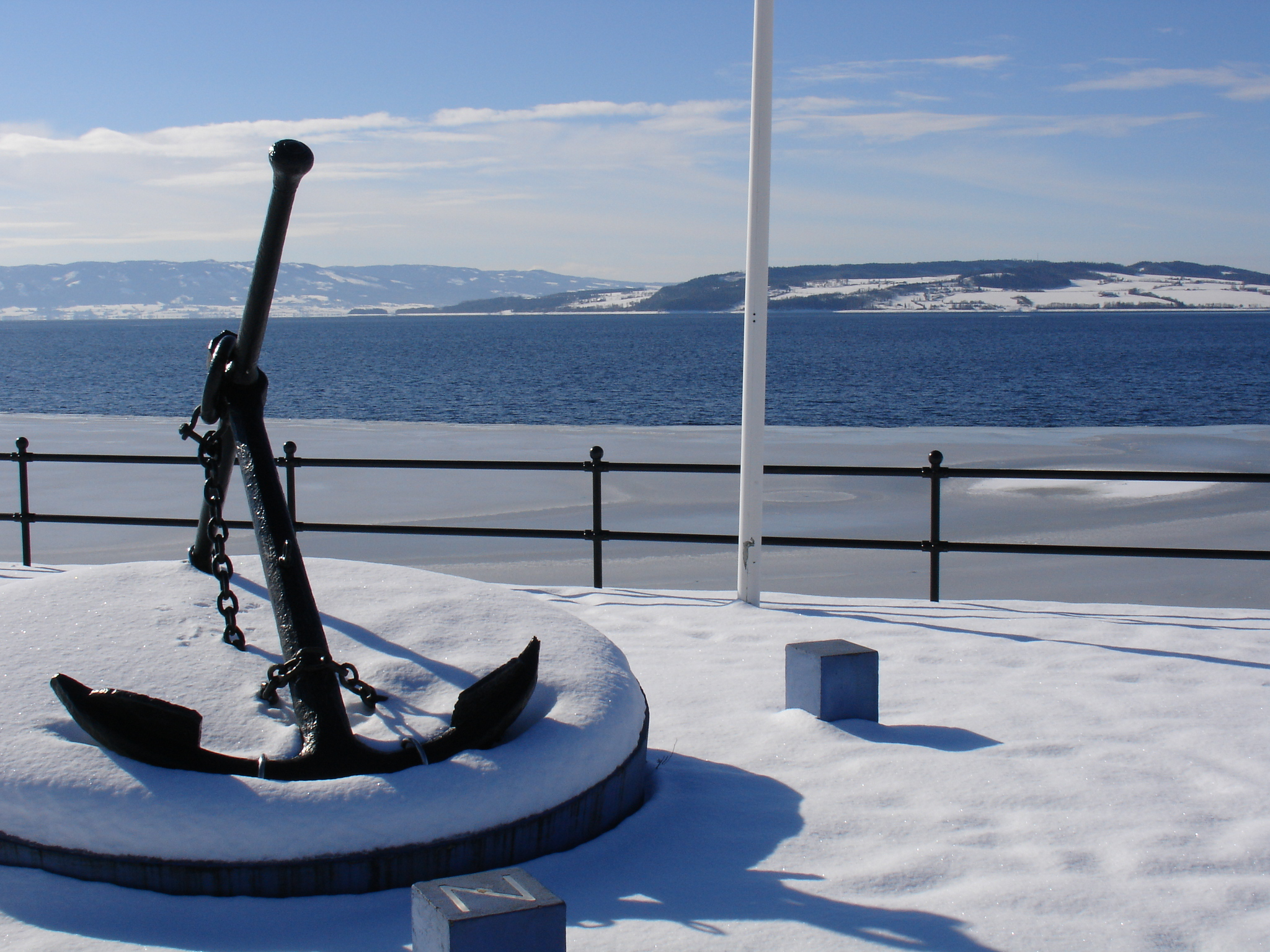
Mjøsa from Hamar

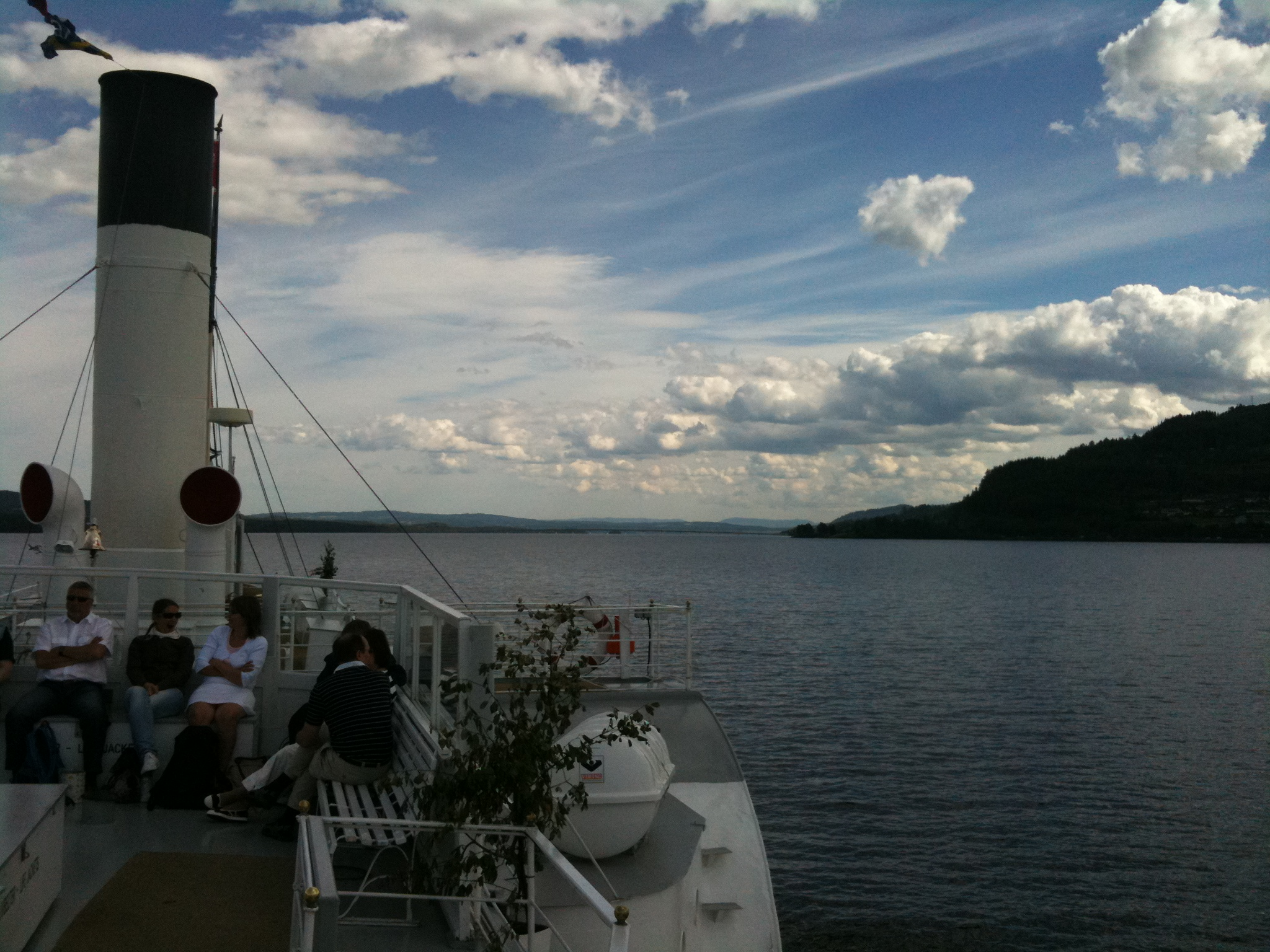
Steamboat Skibladner on the lake of Mjøsa

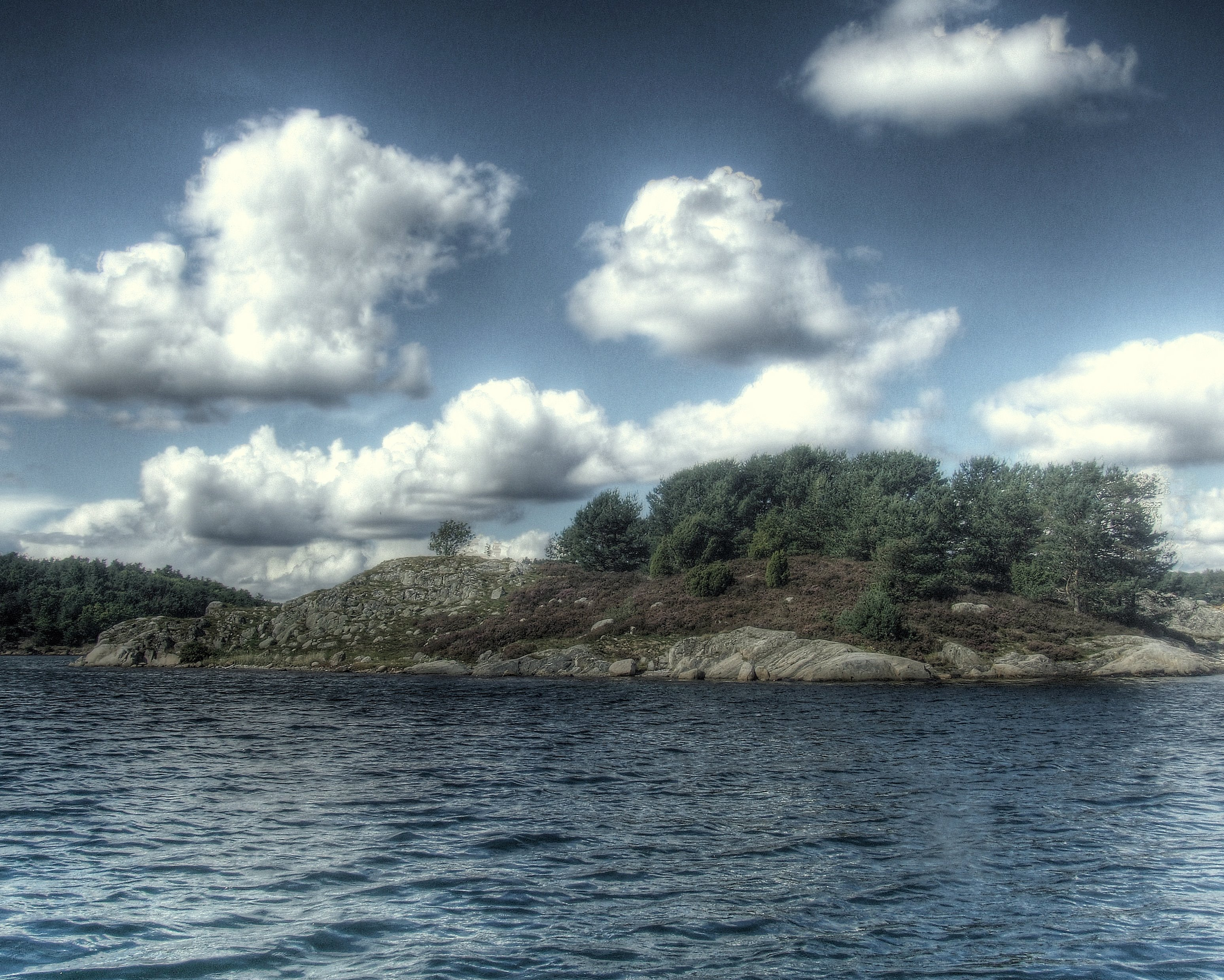
Steinholmen on lake Mjøsa

== Events ==
From 1932 to 1934, ice racing was held on the lake's northern reaches near Lillehammer. Warmer winters had forced race organisers to move racing from Gjersjøen near Oslo. The Norwegian Grand Prix was held there in 1934. The race was won by Swedish driver Per-Viktor Widengren in an Alfa Romeo 8C but poor attendance saw the Grand Prix move back to the Oslo region in 1935.

In 1975, the 14th World Scout Jamboree was held on its shores. More than 17,000 Scouts from 91 countries took part.

In 1995, a Canadian historic aircraft organization named Halifax 57 Rescue recovered a mostly intact Handley Page Halifax bomber from it, which was previously discovered in 1991 to be resting at a depth of 750 feet (228.6 m). The aircraft, NA337, was shot down at 0131 hours on 24 April 1945 while returning from a supply mission and crashed shortly after. It was later restored extensively to its original state (albeit non – flying) and is now one of only three remaining examples of the type anywhere in the world.

== Culture projects ==
The inter-county public art collaboration project, Det Var Jo Ingen Horizont Der is a model for inter-organizational cooperation and collaboration between local municipalities and counties. It is a public "land-art" project that was supported by the Oppland County Municipality and Hedmark County Municipality as well as local municipalities of Eidsvoll, Gjøvik, Hamar, Lillehammer, Ringsaker, Stange, and Østre Toten. These communities all share shoreline with Mjøsa. Det Var Jo Ingen Horizont Der, is an environmental art collaboration including the works of 12 artists' sculptural and multimedia environmental artworks installed at 20 geographic places on and around the shores of Mjøsa. The project is documented in a book and it was part of an exhibition at the Mjøsmuseet (museum) in 2019.

== See also ==
- Toftes Gave
