= Vann (surname) =

- Language: English

Origin
- Language: Middle English
- Derivation: Locative
- Meaning: Fen
- Region of origin: South East England

Other names
- Variant forms: Van, Vanns, Avann, Fan, Fann

Vann is a surname.

== Origins ==
An English surname, Vann originated as a locative name, referring either to specific places named Vann (such as two in Surrey: Vann in Ockley, and Vann in Hambledon), or in general to any fen (from fanne, a South East English dialect word for fenne). Variant spellings of the surname include Van, Vanns, Avann, Fan, and Fann.

== Statistics ==
The 1881 United Kingdom census found 668 people with the surname Vann, primarily in Leicestershire and Warwickshire. Data compiled by Patrick Hanks on the basis of the 2011 United Kingdom census and 2011 census of Ireland found 1,085 people with the surname on the island of Great Britain, and three on the island of Ireland. In the United States, the 2010 census found 15,416 people with the surname Vann, making it the 2,366th-most-common surname in the country. This represented an increase from 14,602 (2,280th-most-common) in the 2000 census. In both censuses, slightly more than half of the bearers of the surname Vann identified as non-Hispanic White, and slightly less than one third as non-Hispanic Black or African American.

== People ==
=== Entertainment ===
- Ameer Vann (born 1996), American rapper
- Amirah Vann (born 1980), American actress
- Barbara Vann (1938–2015), American theatre director and actor
- Stanley Vann (1910–2010), British musician

=== Government and politics ===
- Albert Vann (1934–2022), member of the New York City Council from Brooklyn
- David Vann (mayor) (1928–2000), mayor of Birmingham, Alabama
- David Vann (Cherokee leader) (1800–1863), assistant principal chief and treasurer of the Cherokee Nation
- Earl Vann (1913–1985), member of the Pennsylvania House of Representatives
- Irving G. Vann (1842–1921), New York Court of Appeals judge
- James Vann (c. 1765 – 1809), influential Cherokee leader
- John Paul Vann (1924–1972), lieutenant colonel in the United States Army
- Joseph Vann (1798–1844), Cherokee leader, son of James Vann
- Marilyn Vann, Cherokee Nation engineer and activist

=== Religion ===
- Bernard Vann (1887–1918), English Anglican cleric and recipient of the Victoria Cross
- Cherry Vann (born 1956), British Anglican bishop
- Gerald Vann (1906–1963), British Roman Catholic theologian and philosopher
- Kevin Vann (born 1951), American prelate of the Roman Catholic Church

=== Sport ===
- Arthur Vann (1884–1915), English footballer
- Cleveland Vann (born 1951), American linebacker in the Canadian Football League
- Denis Vann (1916–1961), English cricketer
- John Vann (baseball) (1890–1958), American baseball catcher
- Kalev Vann (1956–2011), Australian rules footballer
- LaDaris Vann (born 1980), American football player
- LeRoy Vann (born 1986), American football cornerback
- Mickey Vann (born 1943), British boxing referee and judge
- Norwood Vann (born 1962), American football player
- Ron Vann (born c. 1936), American football player
- Thad Vann (1907–1982), American college football coach

=== Other ===
- Barry A. Vann (born 1960), American social scientist
- Darren Deon Vann (born 1971), American serial killer
- Donald Vann (born 1949), Cherokee landscape painter
- James Allen Vann (1939–1986), American historian of early modern Germany
- Lizzie Vann, British businesswoman who founded children's food company Organix
- Michael G. Vann (born 1967), American historian of the French colonial empire
- Richard D. Vann, American professor of anesthesiology
- Robert Lee Vann (1879–1940), African-American newspaper publisher and editor
- Stanley Vann (1910–2010), English composer

== See also ==
- Anna McVann (born 1968), Australian swimmer
- Van (surname)
