= Vans (name) =

Vans is both a given name and surname. Notable people with the name include:

- Patrick Vans, Lord Barnbarroch (1529–1597), Scottish judge
- Sir Gammer Vans, character in an English fairy tale of the same name
- Vans Kennedy (1784–1846), Scottish major-general

== See also ==
- Van (disambiguation)
- Vans (disambiguation)

== See also ==
- Patrick Alexander Vans Agnew (1822–1848), British civil servant
