= Van Nest (disambiguation) =

Van Nest may refer to:

== People ==
- Floyd Van Nest Schultz (1910-1986), American educator and engineer
- John Van Nest Talmage (1819-1892), Protestant Christian missionary
- Karen Van Nest (b. 1962) Canadian Paralympic archer and shooter
- Van Nest Polglase (1898-1968), American art director

== Places ==
- Van Nest, Bronx
- Van Nest Gap Tunnel
- Van Nest Hall
- Van Nest–Hoff–Vannatta Farmstead
- Van Nest (Metro-North station)
- Van Nest Refuge Wildlife Management Area
- Van Nest – Weston Burying Ground

== Other ==
- Keker, Van Nest & Peters LLP

== See also ==
- Van Neste, surname list
- Van Ness (disambiguation)
- Vannes (disambiguation)
