= Van Nes =

Van Nes is a Dutch surname. Notable people with the surname include:

- Eeke van Nes (born 1969), Dutch rower
- Hadriaan van Nes (born 1942), Dutch rower
- Irving van Nes (born 1949), Dutch field hockey player
- Johan van Nes (died 1650), Dutch painter

== See also ==
- Vanness Wu (b. 1978), Taiwanese-American actor and singer
- Carol Vaness (b. 1952), American soprano
- Vanes
- Vannes (disambiguation)
- Van Ness (disambiguation)
- Van (disambiguation)
- Nes (disambiguation)
