= Vanne (disambiguation) =

Vanne may refer to:

- Vanne, Haute-Saône, Bourgogne-Franche-Comté, France; a commune
- Vanne (river), France; a river
- Pont-sur-Vanne (Vanne Bridge), Pont-sur-Vanne, Yonne, Bourgogne-Franche-Comté, France; a bridge in the eponymous commune
- Les Vallées-de-la-Vanne (Vanne Valleys), Yonne, Bourgogne-Franche-Comté, France; a commune
- Marda Vanne (1896–1970) South African actress
- Congregation of St. Vanne, a Benedictine reform movement

== See also ==
- Vannes (disambiguation)
- Venne (disambiguation)
- Van de Venne (disambiguation)
- Vann (disambiguation)
- Vane (disambiguation)
- Van (disambiguation)
