= Ness =

Ness or NESS may refer to:

== Places ==
=== Australia ===
- Ness, Wapengo, a heritage-listed natural coastal area in New South Wales

=== United Kingdom ===
- Ness, Cheshire, England, a village
- Ness, Lewis, the most northerly area on Lewis, Scotland, UK
- Cuspate foreland, known in England as "ness", a coastal landform
- Loch Ness, a freshwater loch in the Scottish Highlands, noted for the Loch Ness Monster
- Ness Botanic Gardens, owned by the University of Liverpool and located on the Wirral Peninsula, England
- Ness Islands, in the River Ness, in Scotland
- Ness, North Yorkshire, a former civil parish
- Ness Point, most easterly point of the UK, located in Lowestoft, England
- Ness Waterfall, Scotland
- River Ness, a river which links Loch Ness to the North Sea at Inverness, Scotland, UK

=== United States ===
- Ness City, Kansas
- Ness County, Kansas
- Ness Township, Minnesota

=== Elsewhere ===
- Mount Ness, Palmer Land, Antarctica
- Ness Lake, British Columbia, Canada

== People ==
- Ness (given name)
- Ness (surname)
- Ness, nickname of Alma Moreno (born 1959), Filipina actress and politician
- Ness, a name sometimes used by French rapper Nessbeal (born 1978)

== Fictional entities ==
- Ness (EarthBound), a fictional character featured in the Mother and Super Smash Bros. video game series
- Ness (Irish mythology), a princess
- NESS, one of two warring factions in the anime series Starship Girl Yamamoto Yohko
- Lapras, a Pokémon whose prototype name was Ness

== Organizations and enterprises ==
- Ness Foundation, a medical research charity near Inverness, Scotland
- Ness Digital Engineering, an Israel-based provider of IT services
- New England Skeptical Society (NESS)
- National Emergency Stockpile System, a Canadian reserve system
- Nisga'a Elementary Secondary School (NESS), Gitlakdamix, British Columbia, Canada

== Ships ==
- HMS Ness, two Royal Navy ships
- Ness-class combat stores ship, a Royal Navy class of three ships

== Other uses ==
- Ness Award, an annual award of the Royal Geographical Society beginning in 1970
- Near Earth Space Surveillance (NESS), a mission of the Near Earth Object Surveillance Satellite
- NESS Energy Project, an incinerator in Aberdeen, Scotland

== See also ==
- Nes (disambiguation)
- Van Ness (disambiguation)
