= High Peak Rifles =

Former volunteer unit of Britain's Territorial Army

High Peak Rifles 6th Battalion, Sherwood Foresters 40th Searchlight Regiment, RA 149th Light Anti-Aircraft Regiment, RA
- Active: 1860–2014
- Country: United Kingdom
- Branch: Territorial Army
- Role: Infantry; Air Defence
- Garrison/HQ: Chesterfield
- Engagements: 2nd Boer War First World War: Hohenzollern Redoubt; Gommecourt; Easter Rising; Hindenburg Line; Polygon Wood; Bourlon Wood; German spring offensive; Kemmel; St Quentin Canal; Hundred Days Offensive; Second World War: Battle of Britain; The Blitz; Siege of Dunkirk; Rhine Crossing

Commanders
- Notable commanders: Lord George Cavendish; Lt-Col The Rev Bernard Vann, VC, MC

The High Peak Rifles, later 6th Battalion, Sherwood Foresters, was a volunteer unit of Britain's Territorial Army. First raised in the High Peak area of Derbyshire in 1860, it fought as infantry on the Western Front during the First World War and as an air defence unit during the Second World War. Its descendants remained in the Army Reserve until 2014.

== Origin ==
The origin of the 6th Sherwood Foresters lay in the various Rifle Volunteer Corps (RVCs) formed in northern Derbyshire and the Peak District as part of the enthusiasm for the Volunteer movement during an invasion scare in 1859–60. By June 1860, there were enough company-sized RVCs in the area to form the 3rd Administrative Battalion of Derbyshire RVCs, based at Bakewell (the dates given are those of the first officers' commissions):

- 3rd (Chesterfield) Derbyshire RVC (7 January 1860)
- 6th (High Peak Rifles of Buxton) Derbyshire RVC (16 February 1860; disbanded December 1861)
- 7th (High Peak Rifles of Chapel-en-le-Frith) Derbyshire RVC (1 February 1860)
- 9th (High Peak Rifles of Bakewell) Derbyshire RVC under the command of Lord George Cavendish (28 February 1860)
- 11th (Matlock) Derbyshire RVC under the command of Sir Joseph Paxton (17 March 1860)
- 17th (Clay Cross) Derbyshire RVC (26 January 1861)
- 18th (Whaley Bridge) Derbyshire RVC (16 March 1866, from a half company of the 7th)
- 21st (Hartington) Derbyshire RVC (25 May 1872)
- 22nd (Staveley) Derbyshire RVC (23 September 1874)

Lord George Cavendish of the 9th Derbyshire RVC took command of the administrative battalion with the rank of major.

In 1869 the smaller 2nd Derbyshire Admin Bn was disbanded and its remaining South Derbyshire units were transferred to the 3rd:

- 2nd (Sudbury) Derbyshire RVC, two companies under the command of Lord Vernon (16 March 1860; disbanded 1869))
- 8th (Dove Valley) Derbyshire RVC at Ashbourne (1 February 1860)
- 10th (Wirksworth) Derbyshire RVC (10 March 1860)

In 1867, Lord George Cavendish became Honorary Colonel of the battalion; he was succeeded as Lieutenant-Colonel Commandant by his son James Charles Cavendish, formerly an officer of the Royal Artillery. Most RVCs adopted 'Rifle Grey' for their uniform; however, under J.C. Cavendish, the units of the battalion standardised on scarlet coats with blue facings.

The unit applied to have its RVCs consolidated in 1879, the 3rd Admin Bn being renumbered on 16 March 1880 as the 3rd Derbyshire RVC, changed to 2nd Derbyshire RVC on 15 June 1880, still under the command of Lt-Col J.C. Cavendish. The ten constituent RVCs became lettered companies in order of seniority. This meant that the battalion had six chaplains and ten surgeons, who had previously been attached to individual corps. In the following year, under the Childers Reforms, the Volunteers were attached to their local Regular Army regiments, the 2nd Derbyshire RVC being affiliated to the Sherwood Foresters (The Derbyshire Regiment; from 1902 the Nottinghamshire and Derbyshire Regiment). In 1887 it was redesignated as the 2nd Volunteer Battalion of the regiment, and later adopted the white facings of the Regular battalions, though by special permission it retained its blue Austrian knot on the sleeve, and wore coats rather than tunics.

When Volunteer Infantry Brigades were introduced in 1888, the VBs of the Sherwood Foresters formed part of the North Midland Brigade, although for a few years from 1901 they formed a separate Sherwood Foresters Brigade.

== 2nd Boer War ==
The battalion had been over its establishment strength, and during the 2nd Boer War it was permitted to raise three additional companies, one at Chesterfield, one at Buxton, and one a special Cyclist Company. The battalion formed a service company of volunteers to serve alongside the Regulars in the war, earning the Battle honour South Africa 1900–1902. A total of three officers and 125 other ranks served either with the 1st Battalion or with the Imperial Yeomanry.

== Territorial Force ==
When the Volunteers were subsumed into the Territorial Force (TF) under the Haldane Reforms in 1908, the 2nd VB became the 6th Battalion, Sherwood Foresters. The battalion had its headquarters at the Victoria Diamond Jubilee Drill Hall on Ashgate Road, Chesterfield, and the companies were disposed as follows:

- A Company at 10 Corporation Street, Chesterfield.
- B Company at Market Street, Chapel-en-le-Frith, with detachments based at the drill stations in Hathersage, Peak Dale, Chinley and Edale.
- C Company at The Armoury, Rock Terrace, Buxton, with an outlying detachment at The Armoury, Town Hall Buildings, Ashbourne.
- D Company at The Drill Hall, Bakewell.
- E Company at Drill Hall, Wirksworth, with detachments at The Armoury, Wellington Street, Matlock, and at Cromford.
- F Company at Drill Hall, Staveley.
- G Company at Drill Hall, Clay Cross.
- H Company at Drill Hall, Whaley Bridge, with detachments at New Mills, Disley and Hayfield.

The Regular battalions of the Sherwood Foresters adopted Lincoln green facings after 1907, and were followed by the 6th Bn.

The four TF battalions of the Sherwood Foresters formed the Nottinghamshire and Derbyshire Brigade of the North Midland Division.

== First World War ==
=== Mobilisation ===
When war broke out in Europe in August 1914, the units of the North Midland Division were undergoing their annual training camp, the Notts and Derby Brigade being at Hunmanby on the Yorkshire coast. On August Bank Holiday, 3 August, with Britain's entry into the war imminent, the camp was struck and the battalions entrained for their home towns. Orders to mobilise were received at the company HQs of the 6th Bn at 19.00 on 4 August and they were ordered to assemble at Chesterfield. The battalion's mobilisation plan had been kept up to date by the permanent adjutant, Captain S.F. McL. Lomer (King's Royal Rifle Corps), and became known as 'Lomer's Guide to Chesterfield'. On the second day of mobilisation the men from Bakewell, Wirksworth, Staveley and Clay Cross, together with the half company from Buxton, marched into Chesterfield, where they were met by the Buxton Brass Bands. The companies from Chapel-en-le-Frith, Whaley Bridge, and the half company from Ashbourne arrived the following day. The men were accommodated in the drill hall and Chesterfield Central Schools. On 10 August the battalion laid up its Colours in St Mary's Church and marched to Derby, the war station of the Notts and Derby Brigade and HQ of the North Midland Division. The North Midland Division then moved to the Luton area, where the Notts and Derby Brigade was billeted at Harpenden.

On 31 August, the formation of Reserve or 2nd Line units for each existing TF unit and formation was authorised, after which the parent battalion was designated the 1/6th and the recruits coming forward were organised into the 2/6th Bn in the 2nd Notts & Derby Brigade. Later, a 3/6th Bn was raised to provide reinforcements for the 1st and 2nd Line.

=== 1/6th Battalion ===
On 1 September, the 1st North Midland Division was invited to volunteer for foreign service. This was accepted by the majority of the men, the remainder (in the case of the Notts and Derby Brigade) being posted to a Provisional Battalion of the Sherwood Foresters, which was assigned a role in the defences around London. The division was given warning orders to embark for France about 30 October, but these were later cancelled. Meanwhile, the men went through intensive training, the brigade marching to new quarters at Braintree, Essex in mid-November.

King George V inspected the division on 19 February 1915, and gave permission for the Notts & Derby Brigade to change its title to Sherwood Foresters Brigade. Soon afterwards, embarkation orders arrived. The North Midland Division began landing in France in late February 1915 and by 8 March had completed its concentration – the first complete TF formation to arrive on the Western Front. In early April it went into the line at Messines for two months to learn the techniques of trench warfare. It was numbered the 46th (North Midland) Division in May, when the Sherwood Foresters Brigade was numbered 139th (Sherwood Foresters) Brigade.

The division next spent two months in the Ypres Salient, the battalions taking turns in the tranches at Sanctuary Wood near Hooge. The 1/6th Bn was not directly involved in 139th Brigade's first action (the German flamethrower attack at Hooge on 30–31 July 1915), but was in the attack on the Hohenzollern Redoubt in October that year.

==== Hohenzollern Redoubt ====
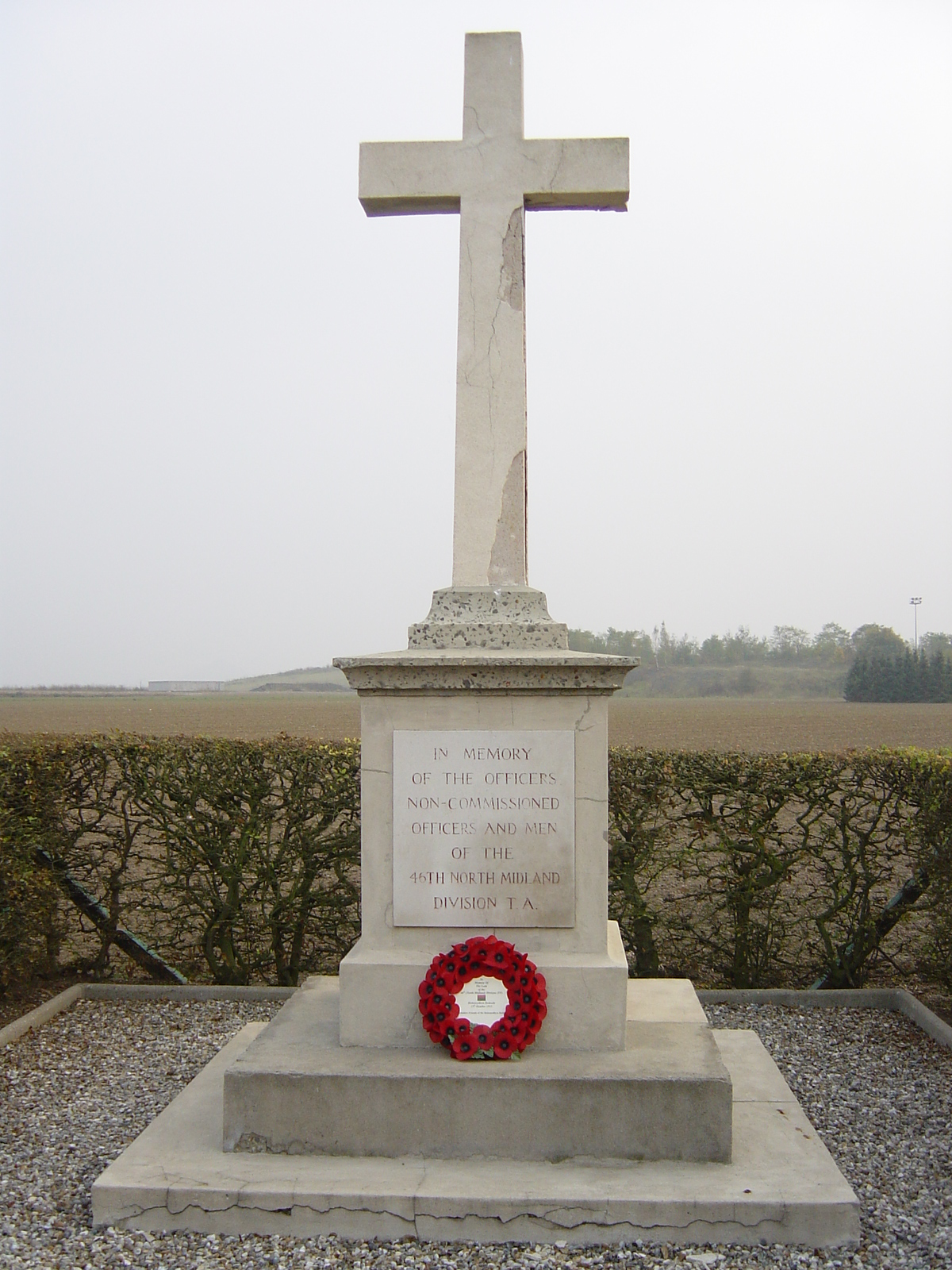
46th Division memorial at Vermelles, starting point for the division's attack on 13 October 1915.

This was an attempt to restart the failed Battle of Loos, and the division was moved down from Ypres on 1 October for the purpose. The Germans recaptured the Hohenzollern trench system on 3 October, and the new attack was aimed at this point. The 137th (Staffordshire) Brigade attacked on the right with 1/6th Sherwood Foresters in support. The Staffords suffered terrible casualties, and the Foresters were sent over to consolidate their meagre gains, which had to be evacuated that night.

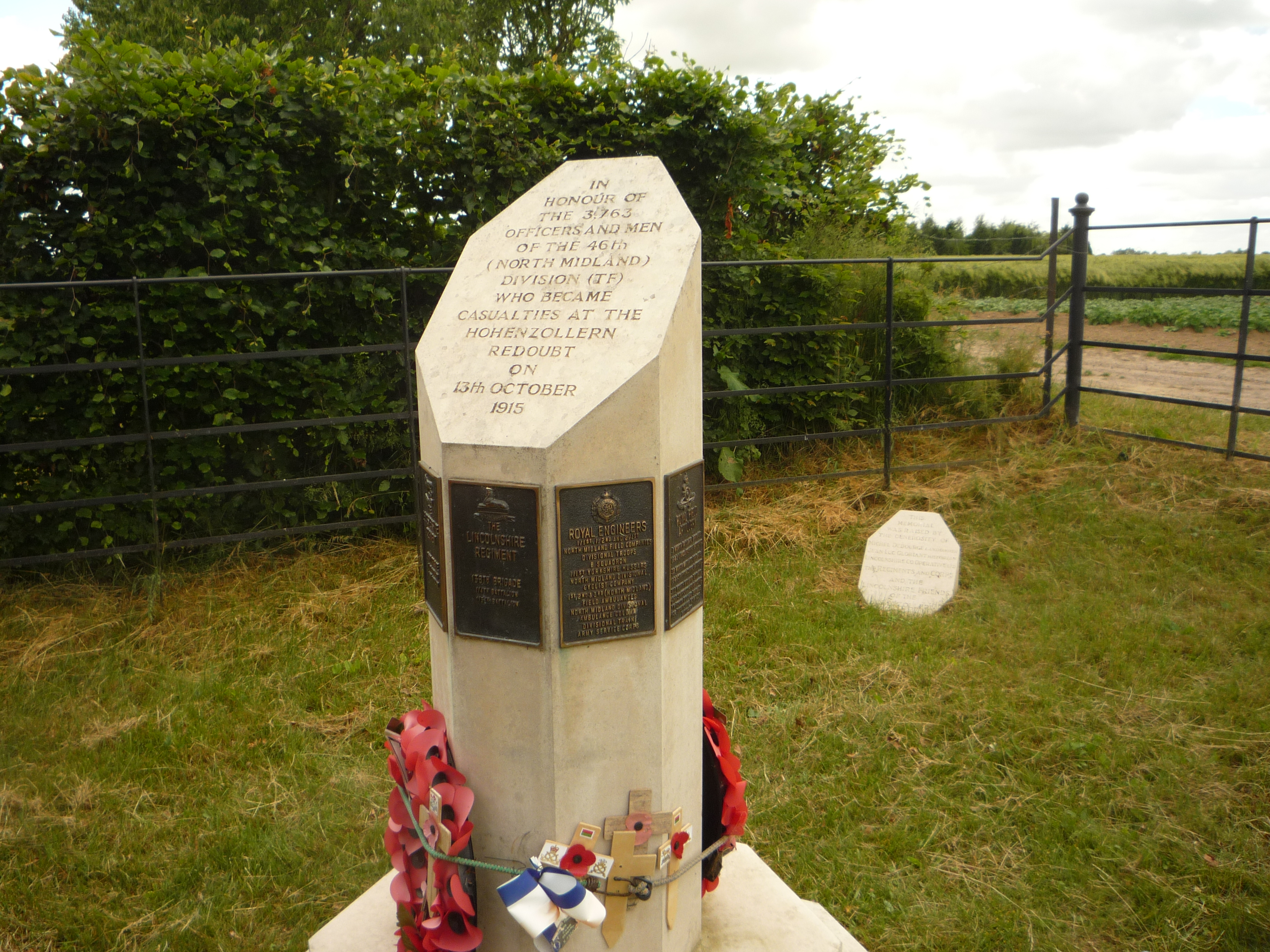
46th (North Midland) Division's memorial at Cité de Madagascar, site of the Hohenzollern Redoubt.

In December 1915, the 46th Division was ordered to Egypt, and part went there. In January 1916, however, the move was cancelled before the Sherwood Foresters had embarked. In the following months there were cases of Paratyphoid fever among the units that returned from Egypt, and the infection spread to units that had remained in France.

==== Gommecourt ====
The 46th Division went back into the line in the Vimy sector, suffering a steady trickle of casualties over the coming months. In May, however, it moved south to take part in the forthcoming offensive on the Somme. The division was ordered to assault the north side of the Gommecourt Salient on 1 July 1916. The operation, in conjunction with the 56th (1st London) Division attacking from the south, aimed at cutting off the salient, but was in fact a diversion for the main attack a few miles south that opened the Battle of the Somme.

In the weeks before the attack, the battalion was engaged in fatigue duties and patrolling, suffering a trickle of casualties; it also suffered a number of casualties from paratyphoid. It received a draft of 42 men from the 8th Entrenching Battalion at the end of May.

On 1 July, 1/6th Bn was in support behind the attacking battalions of 139th Bde. A and B Companies took up positions in the British 1st Support Line, with the battalion bombers and four brigade machine gun teams between them, and C and D Companies were in the 3rd Support Line with the runners and signallers between them. Because of the mud, they were late getting into position and were very tired by the time they arrived, carrying large quantities of equipment and ammunition. When the battalion attempted to move up after Zero hour (07.30), it found that the way was blocked by the carrying parties and last waves of the battalions in front, which had not been able to leave the British front line trench before the smokescreen cleared. Although their first waves had crossed No man's land and got into the German front line, the ground behind them was now being swept by artillery and machine gun fire, and positions re-occupied by Germans coming out of deep dugouts that should have been dealt with by the later waves. It was not until 08.45 that A and B Companies of the 1/6th Bn attempted to cross No man's land, and they were immediately stopped by very heavy casualties. The Commanding Officer, Lt-Col Goodman, called of his battalion's attack. There was an attempt to restart the attack at 15.30, but the smoke barrage was inadequate and it was cancelled. The left-hand platoon did not receive the cancellation order in time, went 'over the top' and was cut down. The battalion lost 41 men killed or died of wounds received on 1 July 1916; most are buried in Foncquevillers Military Cemetery or are listed on the Thiepval Memorial to the missing of the Somme.

Early 1917 saw the 46th Division still holding the line in the same area. However, at the beginning of March, patrols found that the Germans were beginning to retreat from the Gommecourt defences. The division followed up as the enemy retreated as far as their new Hindenburg Line defences well beyond the Somme battlefields. 46th Division was withdrawn from the pursuit on 17 March. It spent some time clearing the battlefield of 1 July 1916 and burying the dead who had been lying in No man's land for almost 10 months.

==== Lens and Hill 70 ====
In April 1917, the division moved to the Lens area and became involved in 10 weeks' bloody fighting round Hill 70. The division handed over the line to the 2nd Canadian Division in early July, having secured the jumping-off positions from which the Canadian Corps launched the successful Battle of Hill 70 in August.

The 46th Division was not used offensively again until September 1918, spending its time in tours of duty holding the front line in quiet sectors. The reorganisation of the British Expeditionary Force (BEF) on the Western Front in early 1918 led to the disbandment of the 1/7th Sherwood Foresters, a draft of whom were sent to reinforce the 1/6th Bn. After the 2/6th Bn was disbanded in July (see below) the 1/6th was simply referred to as the 6th Bn.

==== St Quentin Canal ====
The division was given the most difficult task in the Battle of the St. Quentin Canal on 29 September 1918: it had to cross the canal itself, where it constituted part of the Hindenburg Line. The crossing was to be made by the 137th (Staffordshire) Brigade, with 138th and 139th Bdes following up and then attacking towards the second objective. Zero hour was at 05.50, when the Staffordshire moved out behind a creeping barrage, quickly captured the German front line trenches, crossed the canal, and consolidated on the first objective (the 'Red Line') under the protection of a standing barrage. The other two brigades then crossed the canal, and when the barrage began to roll forward again at 11.20, the Sherwoods jumped off from the Red Line with 6th Bn on the right.

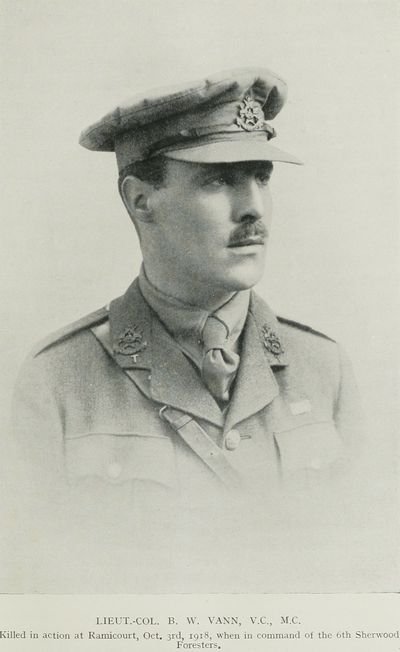
Lt-Col The Rev Bernard Vann, VC, MC.

Their advance was parallel to the canal, which formed a defensive right flank as they rolled up the German trench lines. They reached the first intermediate objective by noon without trouble. However, the morning fog and initial smokescreen was clearing, there was stout resistance from German detachments on the high ground north of the village of Bellenglise, and the attack was held up by artillery fire and from machine guns on the far side of the canal. A party of 6th Bn therefore recrossed the canal and bayonetted and shot the German gunners, whose infantry escort had deserted them. Fearing that the delay would mean that the battalion lost its creeping barrage, the CO, Lt-Col The Rev Bernard Vann (a school chaplain in civilian life), dashed up to the firing line and got the attack moving again. At the objective he reorganised the men under fire to consolidate their position. He then led a dash to the nearby village of Lehaucourt where the Germans were bringing up horse teams to remove their guns. 'The Foresters won the race, and in the fight that ensued Vann personally liquidated five gunners with his revolver, boot and riding crop'. He was awarded the Victoria Cross for his actions on this day.

==== Ramicourt ====
The 46th went into action again on 3 October at Ramicourt, where it penetrated the German Beaurevoir Line. This time, the Sherwood Foresters were in the lead, with 6th Bn as their support battalion. The two leading battalions diverged either side of Ramicourt, so Vann led his battalion HQ and reserve company to mop up the village between them, while tanks cleared the outskirts. On leaving the village, as he moved from section to section, Vann was killed by a sniper.

For a minute or two the 6th Foresters were stunned into inactivity ... Then a white flag was seen to be flying from where the worst of the fire had been coming. A platoon advanced to accept the surrender. They were met with a hail of machine-gun fire. The Germans had chosen the worst possible moment for such a trick. The Foresters came at them with taut, unshakable deliberation and slew them in the dust of Ramicourt.

The attack onwards from the first objective was led by the 6th Bn after the barrage lifted. It met strong enemy resistance and was engaged in street fighting in Montbrehain, particularly around the cemetery, which had been fortified, and could not be held against German counter-attacks. However, over 1000 German prisoners were taken around Montbrehain.

==== Andigny ====
The Battle of Andigny on 17 October was 46th Division's last general action of the war. The Sherwood Foresters attacked on the right with the 6th Bn as brigade reserve. Direction keeping in the morning mist was difficult, and German machine gunners resisted fiercely, but the leading battalion, joined by the 6th, swept forwards and was on the objective by 09.45, and dug in there. After a few days' rest, the division joined the pursuit of the retreating enemy, with few actions of note before the Armistice was signed.

Demobilisation of the 46th Division began in January 1919, and the cadres of the units returned to England in June. The battalion was disembodied on 26 June 1919.

=== 2/6th Battalion ===
The 2nd-Line battalion was formed on 14 September 1914 at Chesterfield. In October, Battalion HQ was established at the Empire Hotel in Buxton. Initially it was intended to provide drafts for the 1/6th Bn in France, but this role was later taken over by the 3/6th Bn. Mirroring its 1st-Line parent, the battalion formed part of 2/1st Notts & Derby Brigade in 2nd North Midland Division; these were later numbered 178th (2/1st Nottinghamshire and Derbyshire) Brigade and 59th (2nd North Midland) Division respectively. Training was carried out at Luton, Dunstable, and later at Cassiobury Park, Watford. There was a shortage of weapons and equipment. Eventually, the men were issued with .256-in Japanese Ariska rifles with which to train. These were not replaced with Lee-Enfield rifles until September 1915.

==== Ireland ====
In the Spring of 1916, the 59th Division was the designated 'mobile division' in Home Forces, intended to repel German invasion of the East Coast, but on Easter Monday, 24 April, it was sent at a few hours' notice to Dublin to help quell the Easter Rising – the first TF units to serve in Ireland. 178th Brigade went by rail to Liverpool where they embarked and landed the following morning at Kingstown (Dún Laoghaire). The brigade advanced into Dublin in two parallel columns, the left column composed of 2/5th and 2/6th Sherwood Foresters marching via the inland road to the Royal Hospital Kilmainham, while the rest of the brigade suffered heavy casualties fighting their way into the city.

The British forces settled down to besiege and bombard the rebel-held positions. Part of the 2/6th Bn held a section round Capel Street. Captain Reginald Brace with 80 men manned a barricade opposite the rebel headquarters at the General Post Office. Breaking up a strong attack, he set fire to a republican barricade and rescued a lieutenant with a small party who had been taken hostage. Company Sergeant Major S.H Lomas was awarded a DCM for erecting barricades under heavy fire.

The rebels in Dublin surrendered on 29 April and the 2/6th rejoined 178th Brigade at Kilmainham. On 3 May, 2/6th Bn provided 450 men for No 1 Mobile Column under its CO, Lt-Col H.S. Hodgkin. The column marched to Longford and then through the counties of Roscommon, Leitrim, Longford, Westmeath and part of Meath, looking for arms and rebels. It covered 200 miles in three weeks.

During the summer, the 178th Brigade moved to Curragh Camp and resumed training, while maintaining a 'Flying Column' ready to pacify outlying areas. The division remained in garrison in Ireland until the end of the year. With its units spread out in small garrisons, collective training was hindered. 59th Division returned to England in January 1917 and began final battle training at Fovant, where there was a large purpose-built camp on the edge of the Salisbury Plain training area. However, it never trained as a division, and when it was inspected before embarkation for active service, it was reported as being only partially trained. Nevertheless, it began moving to France in February.

==== Hindenburg Line ====
On 26 February 1917, the battalion entrained at Fovant and moved to Folkestone where it embarked for Boulogne, landing on 28 February. By 3 March, the brigade had concentrated at Warfusée near Amiens. Advance platoons went into the trenches on 14 March, and on the evening of 15 March the 2/6th Bn took its place in the front line. The following day, the Germans began a planned retreat to the Hindenburg Line in their rear, and the poorly trained 59th had to follow up.

At Le Verguier, the 178th Brigade ran into the enemy. On 31 March, 'the 2/6th advanced very steadily in open order through rifle and shell fire on Jeancourt [south-east of Le Verguier] and drove the Germans from that village and up the slopes of the ridge behind'. However, the village was untenable and the battalion retired to some old German trenches until patrols could reoccupy the village during the night. On the night of 2 April, the brigade attacked Le Verguier, but the artillery cooperation plan was confused, and they ran into uncut barbed wire and suffered casualties. Not until 9 April did the Germans evacuate Le Verguier.

There followed some weeks of trench duty in front of the Hindenburg Line, followed by intense training through the summer.

==== Polygon Wood ====
In September, the division moved to the Ypres Salient to take part in its first full-scale action, the 3rd Ypres Offensive. The 59th relieved the 55th (West Lancashire) Division after its successful attack at the Battle of the Menin Road Ridge, and then took the lead in the next phase, the Battle of Polygon Wood (26 September). This was equally successful, with 178th Bde advancing steadily behind its creeping barrage onto the final objectives, after which 2/6th Bn held off a determined counter-attack with the assistance of a further artillery barrage.

==== Bourlon Wood ====
59th Division was next moved south to join in the Battle of Cambrai. The division relieved the Guards Division on 28 November and entered the recently captured line between Cantaing and Bourlon Wood. Fierce German counter-attacks began on 30 November, and battalions became scattered as they were sent to support the hardest-pressed formations. By 4 December the decision had been made to withdraw from the Bourlon Salient, and 59th Division held covering positions on Flesquières Ridge while this was carried out. On 7 December the British were back on the line that they would hold for the coming winter.

==== German Spring Offensive ====
When the BEF was reorganised in January 1918, the 2/6th Sherwood Foresters received a large draft of men from the disbanded 2/8th Bn.

The German spring offensive opened on 21 March while the division was in the Bullecourt sector of the line, 178th Bde holding the right sector with 2/6th Bn on the left, occupying a thinly held forward zone with the main position behind. A heavy German bombardment began at 05.00 and immediately cut all telephone lines; the brigade commander last heard from the signalling officer of 2/6th Bn at 05.05. When the German infantry attack came in at 08.30, it was covered by morning mist and within an hour had penetrated and rolled up the line as parties of Sherwood Foresters were cut off and surrounded but fought on until they were overrun. Only 53 men of 178th Bde got away, the rest becoming casualties or prisoners. The CO of 2/6th Bn, Lt-Col H.S. Hodgkin, was among those taken prisoner, and the battalion suffered 131 killed, one of the highest casualty rates of the battle. The survivors, together with their rear echelon troops, then spent the next 10 days wandering around with divisional HQ on a long retreat.

The battalion was made up to strength with drafts, but these were not Midlanders, and there was no time to train the unit. It went to hold the line on the Passchendaele Ridge, from where it was sent on 12 April to reinforce 19th (Western) Division on Kemmel Ridge, which was the focus of the renewed German attack. On 17 April, (the 1st Battle of Kemmel) the Sherwood Foresters, without artillery support, held off fierce attacks by means of rifle and Lewis gun fire. The 2/6th Bn was relieved by French troops the following day.

By now, the 59th Division had suffered such heavy casualties that it was temporarily disbanded in May and its battalions reduced to cadres sent to train new drafts at St Omer. The 2/6th Bn was disbanded on 31 July.

=== 3/6th Battalion ===
The 3/6th Battalion was formed at Chesterfield on 1 March 1915 and in October moved to Belton Park near Grantham, where the 3rd Line battalions of the Sherwood Foresters were concentrated. On 8 April 1916 it was redesignated the 6th Reserve Bn of the regiment. After the outbreak of the Easter Rising (see above) the Reserve Bns of the Sherwood Foresters moved to the Lincolnshire coast, building and manning anti-invasion defences. On 1 September the 6th Reserve Bn was absorbed by the 5th Reserve Bn at Grainthorpe.

=== 21st Battalion ===
The Home Service men of the TF battalions of the Sherwood Foresters had been formed into a Provisional Battalion, which was assigned a role in the defences around London, which involved digging many miles of trenches. In June 1915 the Home Service men of the 5th, 6th and 8th Bns Sherwood Foresters were organised into the 29th Provisional Battalion at Walton-on-the-Naze, forming part of 7th Provisional Brigade for coastal defence. The Military Service Act 1916 swept away the Home/Foreign Service distinction, whereupon all TF soldiers became liable for overseas service, if medically fit. The role of the Provisional Battalions changed to physical conditioning to render men fit for drafting overseas, and they became numbered battalions of their parent units. 7th Provisional Brigade became 226th Mixed Brigade as part of 71st Division, and on 1 January 1917 the 29th Provisional Battalion became the 21st Battalion Sherwood Foresters. It later moved to Frinton-on-Sea and then Clacton. It was disbanded on 12 January 1918.

== Interwar ==
The 6th Sherwood Foresters was reformed on 7 February 1920 in the TF, which was reconstituted as the Territorial Army in 1921.

Three cadet corps were also affiliated to the battalion:

- Chesterfield Grammar School
- Dronfield Grammar School
- Queen Elizabeth's Grammar School, Ashbourne

=== 40th (Sherwood Foresters) Anti-Aircraft Battalion ===
On 10 December 1936, the 46th (North Midland) Division was disbanded and its headquarters was reconstituted as 2nd Anti-Aircraft Division to control the increasing number of anti-aircraft (AA) units being created north of London. At the same time, several of its infantry battalions were converted into searchlight battalions of the Royal Engineers (RE). The 6th Bn Sherwood Foresters was among these, becoming 40th (The Sherwood Foresters) Anti-Aircraft Battalion, RE (TA), forming part of 32nd (South Midland) Anti-Aircraft Group in 2 AA Division. The HQ and 358–361 Anti-Aircraft Companies were at Chesterfield.

== Second World War ==
=== Mobilisation ===
90 cm 'Projector Anti-Aircraft', displayed at Fort Nelson, Hampshire.

The TA's AA units were mobilised on 23 September 1938 during the Munich Crisis, with units manning their emergency positions within 24 hours, even though many did not yet have their full complement of men or equipment. The emergency lasted three weeks, and they were stood down on 13 October. In February 1939 the existing AA defences came under the control of a new Anti-Aircraft Command. In June a partial mobilisation of TA units was begun in a process known as 'couverture', whereby each AA unit in rotation did a month's tour of duty at selected AA and searchlight positions. On 24 August, ahead of the declaration of war, AA Command was fully mobilised at its war stations.

On mobilisation, 40th AA Bn was in 39th AA Bde, forming part of 7th AA Division. The division was still being formed, and its responsibilities were shortly afterwards fixed as defence of the Teesside and Tyneside industrial areas. while 39 AA Bde remained in 2 AA Division covering the area between the Humber Estuary and Sheffield. On 7 September 1939, Battalion HQ moved from Coniston to Bishop Burton Hall near Beverley.

=== Battle of Britain ===
After the Fall of France, German day and night air raids and mine laying began along the East Coast of England, intensifying through June 1940. Some of the airfields in 39 AA Bde's area were also attacked.

All the RE AA battalions were transferred to the Royal Artillery (RA) on 1 August 1940, and the battalion was redesignated as 40th (The Sherwood Foresters) Searchlight Regiment, Royal Artillery, with the AA companies becoming S/L batteries.

=== The Blitz ===
As German night air raids on UK cities intensified (The Blitz), the units of 39 AA Bde continued to cover the Humber and Scunthorpe in a newly formed 10th AA Division.

In mid-September 1940, S/L layouts had to be thinned out to a 6000 yard spacing due to equipment shortages. 40 S/L Rgt redeployed with RHQ and 359 Btys at Elsham, North Lincolnshire, 358 Bty at Scawby, 361 Bty at Patrington, and 360 Bty remaining at Rise and Skirlow. The regiment supplied a cadre of experienced officers and men to 232nd S/L Training Rgt at Devizes where it provided the basis for a new 547 S/L Bty formed on 16 January 1941. This battery later joined 54th (Durham Light Infantry) S/L Rgt.

The AA guns and searchlights of the Humber Gun Zone struggled to defend Hull against the onslaught (the Hull Blitz), though they and the night fighters from RAF Kirton in Lindsey scored some successes. In one notable engagement on the night of 8/9 May, Gunner Maycock in a detachment of 358 SL Bty, aboard a river barge named Clem, brought down a low-flying Heinkel He 111 bomber with a light machine gun.

During 1941, the searchlight layout over the Midlands and South Yorkshire was reorganised, so that any hostile raid approaching the Gun Defended Areas (GDA) around the towns had to cross more than one searchlight belt, and then within the GDAs the concentration of lights was increased.

=== 149th (Sherwood Foresters) Light AA Regiment ===
After the Blitz ended in May 1941, there was pressure on AA Command to reduce the numbers of searchlight regiments to boost the light AA (LAA) gun units equipped with Bofors 40 mm guns. First, 359 S/L Bty was converted into 495 LAA Bty in 147th (Glasgow) LAA Rgt. Then in June 1943, 40th S/L Rgt was converted into 149th (Sherwood Foresters) Light Anti-Aircraft Regiment, RA at Holywood, Northern Ireland, with 358, 360 and 361 S/L Btys converted into 501, 502 and 503 LAA Btys. From August to December 1943, the regiment formed part of 55th (West Lancashire) Infantry Division, a reserve formation in South Eastern Command. Then it was attached to Second Army to prepare for the Normandy Invasion (Operation Overlord).

On 23 February 1944, 501 and 503 LAA Btys became independent and were replaced in the regiment by 80 LAA Bty (from 30th LAA Rgt) and 283 LAA Bty (returned to the UK from 17th LAA Rgt serving in the Mediterranean theatre). 501 LAA Battery was later broken up into its constituent Troops (75–77) to reinforce 25th LAA Rgt of 50th (Northumbrian) Infantry Division and 503 LAA Bty into 78–80 Trps to reinforce 89th LAA Rgt of 49th (West Riding) Infantry Division, both required for Overlord.

By D-Day, 149 LAA Rgt was in 107th AA Bde; the brigade and its units finally disembarked in Normandy between 6 and 19 August, when it took over AA defence of Caen. With the breakout from the Normandy bridgehead at the end of August, the brigade handed over this responsibility and began advancing across France with First Canadian Army. The brigade's first task was to cover the bridges thrown over the Risle by II Canadian Corps, for which LAA guns were particularly required.

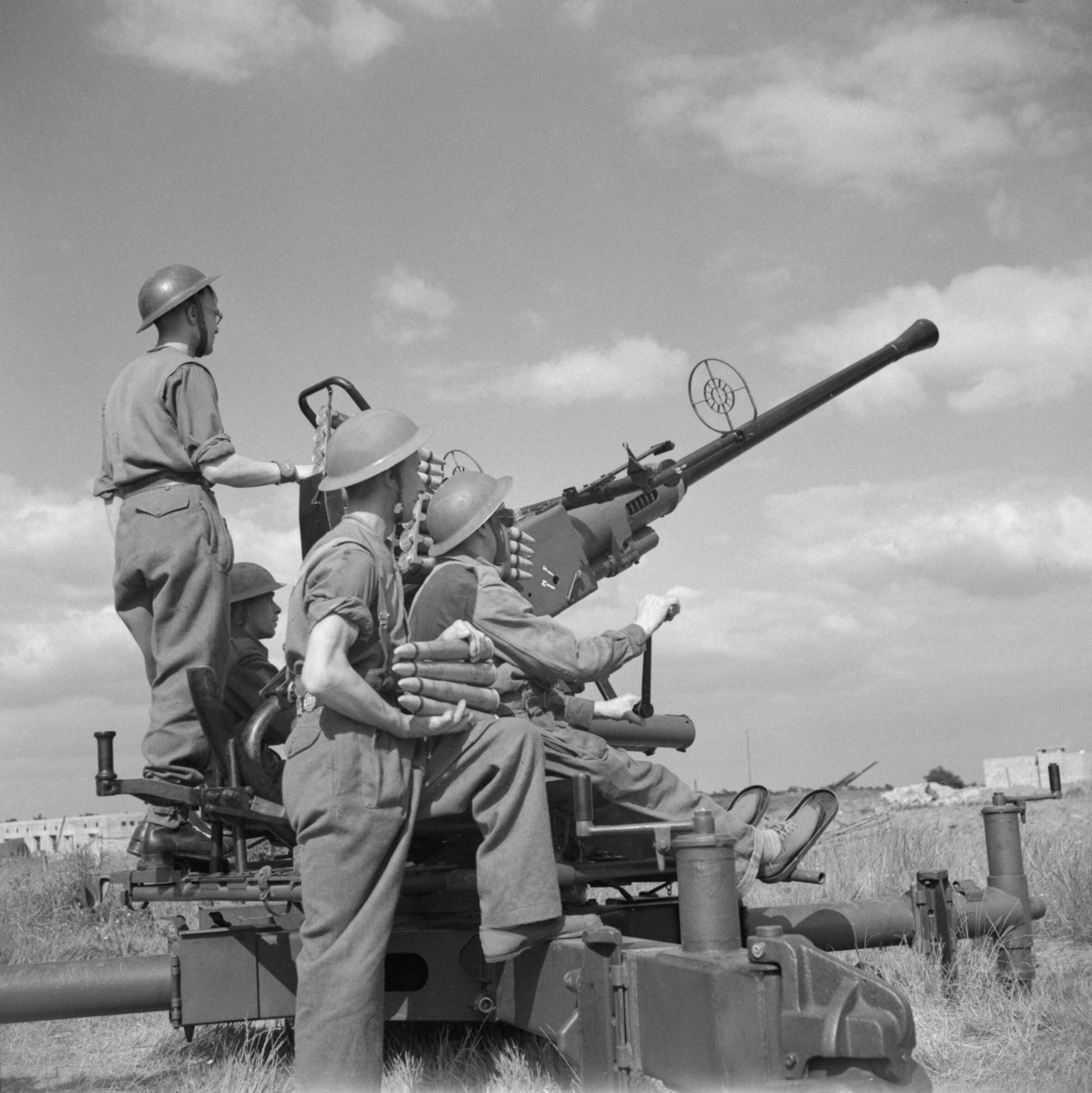
Bofors gun and crew, summer 1944.

The brigade was then moved up to support the Allied Siege of Dunkirk. 149 LAA deployed outside the perimeter on 17 September. The brigade acted both as an AA defence formation and as an Army Group Royal Artillery, with both HAA and LAA guns being employed against ground targets, beginning the day after their arrival and lasting until February 1945. The two LAA regiments (149 and 32) were sometimes firing 5-6000 rounds a day of 40mm ammunition. In October the Luftwaffe began low-level air drops of supplies to the beleaguered German garrison, and these were targeted by LAA guns working in cooperation with searchlights. By December, 502 Bty had been detached from 149 LAA Rgt and was deployed under 74th AA Bde to guard the vital bridges at Nijmegen, Grave and Mook. Large numbers of German aircraft attacked or overflew these bridges in December during the Ardennes offensive, particularly on 1 January 1945 (Operation Bodenplatte).

In mid-February, 107 AA Bde was released from its commitments at Dunkirk and moved to Holland for operations under First Canadian Army. From 18 March it was deployed to reinforce 74 AA Bde in guarding the vital supply lines across the rivers Maas and Waal and covering the major dumps of equipment that were built up for the Rhine Crossing (Operation Plunder) planned for 24 March. Two detached batteries of 149 LAA Rgt, 80 and 502, were included in this deployment. Four days after the Rhine was crossed, 107 AA Bde including 149 AA Regt (less one Bty still on the approach routes) dug in round II Canadian Corps' bridgehead at Emmerich, which had been declared an Inner Artillery Zone (IAZ) up to 10,000 feet. Low-level attacks had become too dangerous because of effective LAA fire, and Luftwaffe attacks on the Rhine bridges ended altogether on 28 March.

By mid-April, 21st Army Group had advanced so far into Germany that 107 Bde could be relieved at the Rhine bridges and moved up to rejoin the Canadians, who had swung into North Holland and reached the Frisian coast. On 4 May, all AA action over 21st Army Group was suspended unless in response to a hostile act: the German surrender at Lüneburg Heath followed on 7 May and all AA positions were ordered to stand down on 12 May. 107 AA Bde's units remained on guard and administration duties under the Canadian Army for several months.

The regiment served as part of British Army of the Rhine and with 80, 283 and 502 LAA Btys was placed in suspended animation in February 1946 in Germany

== Postwar ==
When the TA was reconstituted in 1947 the regiment was reformed at Chesterfield as 575th (6th Bn Sherwood Foresters) Light Anti-Aircraft Regiment, RA (circa 1950–51, the '6th Bn' was dropped from the title). It formed part of 58 AA Bde (the old 32 AA Bde) at Derby.

In 1961, the regiment returned to the Royal Engineers as 575th (The Sherwood Foresters) Field Squadron, RE, in 140 Corps Engineer Regiment, Royal Engineers. When the TA was converted into the TAVR in 1967, 140 Regiment was disbanded and provided personnel to the Derbyshire (Territorial) Bn, Sherwood Foresters. In 1969, the battalion was reduced to cadre (later C (Derbyshire Foresters) Company in the Worcestershire and Sherwood Foresters) and 575 (The Sherwood Foresters) Fd Sqn was reformed in 73 Engineer Regiment.

575 Field Squadron was withdrawn from the army's order of battle under the 2020 Army Reserve structure changes and was disbanded in 2014, two troops and the Chesterfield TA Centre (Wallis Barracks) being transferred to 350 Fd Sqn (Explosive Ordnance Disposal).

== Honorary Colonel ==
The following officers served as Honorary Colonel of the battalion:

- Lord George Cavendish, Commanding Officer 1860–67, appointed 1867.
- Col J.C. Cavendish, ADC to Queen Victoria, VD, Commanding Officer 1869–97, appointed 1897.
- Lt-Col Edward Cavendish, 10th Duke of Devonshire, MBE, TD, appointed 1918.

== Battle Honours ==
The battalion was awarded the honour South Africa 1900–1902 for the service of its volunteers during the 2nd Boer War. During the First World War, the battalion contributed to the honours of the Sherwood Foresters. The RE and RA do not carry Battle Honours, so none were awarded to the SL/LAA regiment.

== Insignia ==
The detachment of volunteers from the battalion who served in the 2nd Boer War wore a green diamond flash on their tropical helmet. This was later moved to the back of the tunic during the First World War, and the tradition of wearing it thus was perpetuated by 40th S/L Rgt and 575 LAA Rgt. The Sherwood Foresters' cap badge was also worn by the two regiments with a Lincoln green backing.

== Memorials ==
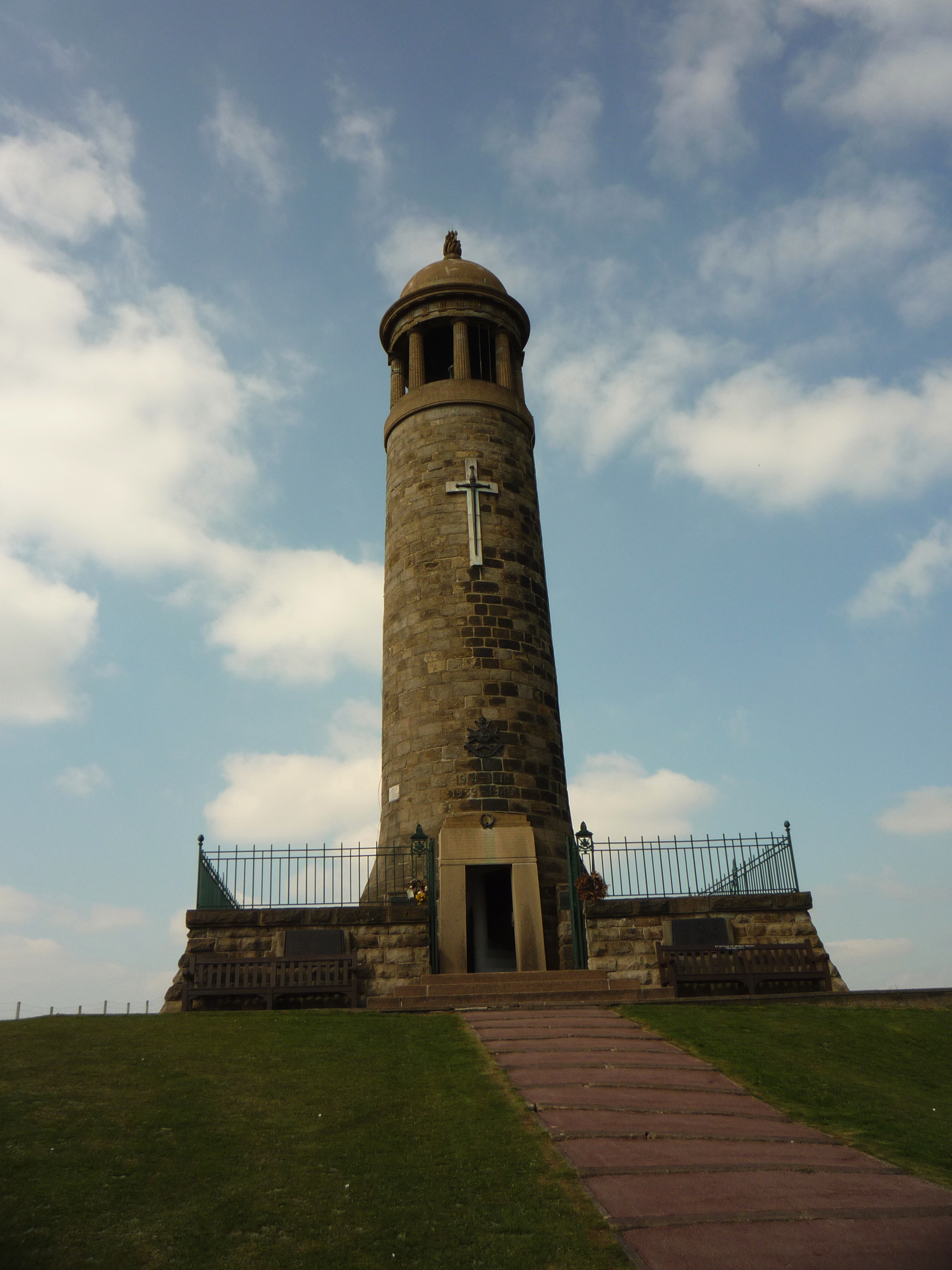
The Sherwood Foresters memorial tower at Crich Hill in Derbyshire

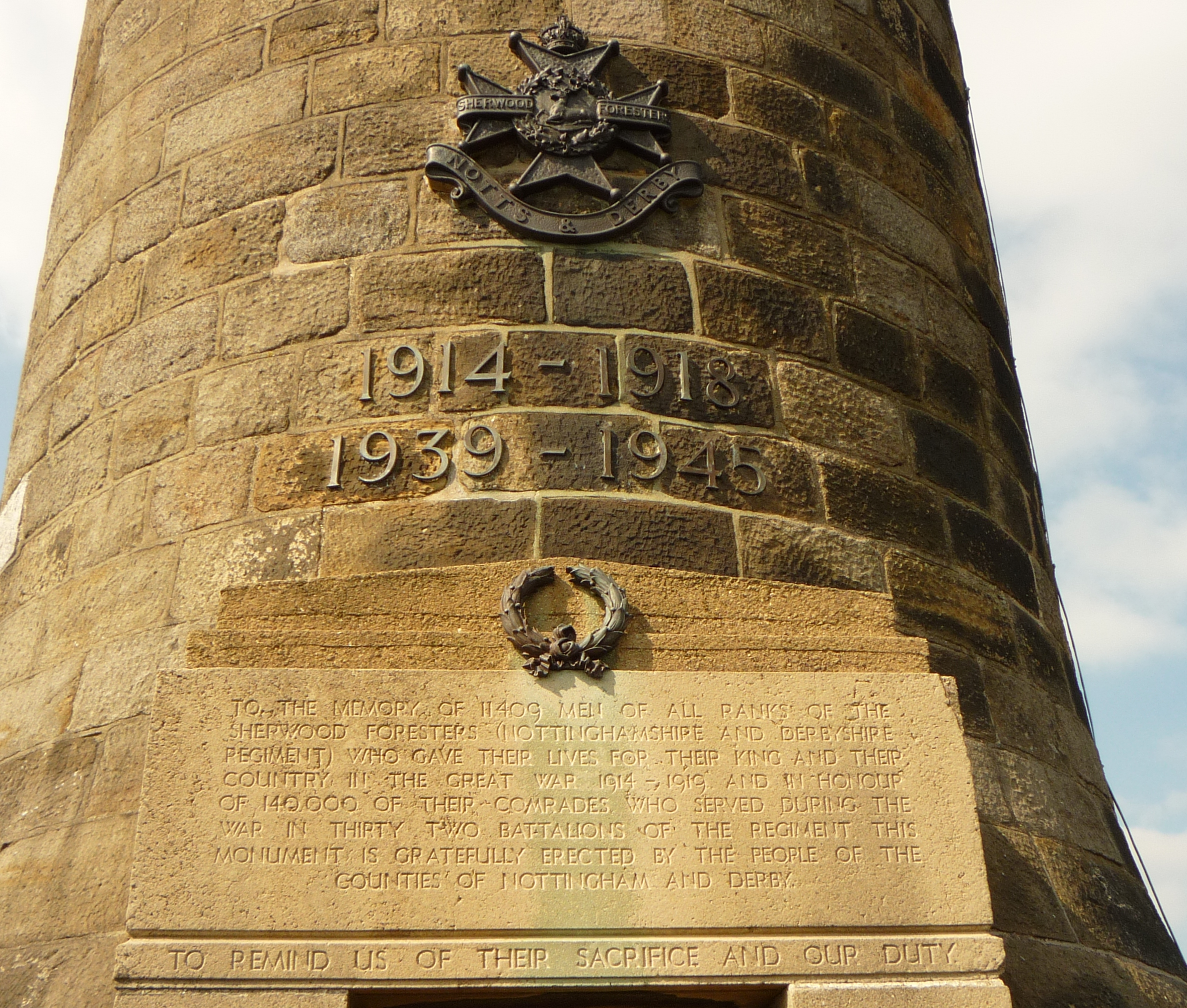
Detail of the memorial tower

After the First World War, a memorial tower to those Sherwood Foresters who had died in battle was erected in 1923 at the summit of Crich Hill in Derbyshire, on the site of an older tower called Crich Stand. It contains a beacon that can be seen from considerable distances at night.

There are two memorials to 46th Division at the Hohenzollern Redoubt, see above.

Also after the First World War, the 59th Division erected identical memorial plaques in the parish churches of the towns most closely identified with the division's units, including Chesterfield Parish Church, which was unveiled in February 1927. The plaque carries the original order of battle of the division and lists the battle honours awarded.

== See also ==
There are many photographs and documents relating to the battalion at Derbyshire Territorials in the Great War.

== External sources ==
- British Army site
- British Army units from 1945 on
- British Military History
- Crich Memorial
- Great War Forum
- The Long, Long Trail
- Brett Payne, 'Military Uniforms in Victorian and Edwardian Derbyshire' at Photo-Sleuth.
- Orders of Battle at Patriot Files
- Land Forces of Britain, the Empire and Commonwealth – Regiments.org (archive site)
- Royal Artillery 1939–1945
- Graham Watson, The Territorial Army 1947
