= Graham John Hills =

British chemist (1926–2014)

Sir Graham John Hills
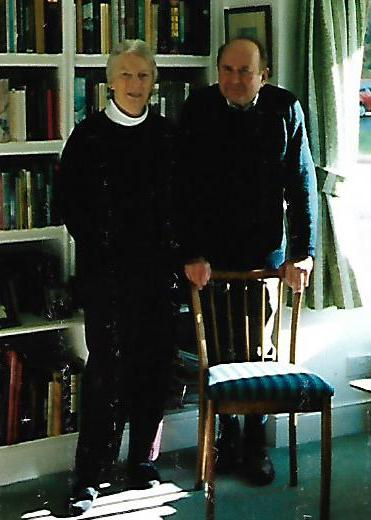
- Sir Graham Hills and Lady Mary Hills at their Inverness home (March 2000)
- Born: 9 April 1926; Southend-on-Sea, Essex, U.K.
- Died: 9 February 2014 (aged 87)
- Occupations: University Principal, Physical chemist, Educationalist
- Spouses: Brenda Stubbington (d. 1974); Mary Jane McNaughton (1980-2013; her death)
- Children: 4

Sir Graham Hills FRSE (9 April 1926 – 9 February 2014) was a physical chemist, principal of the University of Strathclyde, and a governor of the BBC. He was born in Southend-on-Sea, Essex and educated at Westcliff High School for Boys and Birkbeck College, London (BSc 1946, PhD 1950). He was knighted in 1988 for his services to education.

== Academic career ==
Hills served as a professor of Physical Chemistry at the University of Southampton for 18 years, until 1980, when he became principal at Strathclyde University, succeeding Samuel Curran who had held the post since 1959. There, his early foci were accommodating cuts to government funding by the University Grants Committee (UK), and dealing with the school's other financial difficulties. He found alternative sources of income, restructured the university (in 1982) to reduce its nine schools to four, and introduced early retirement for faculty members. Hills also changed the academic year to the two-term semester structure.

With the financial challenges stabilized, Hills turned to expanding the university. Purchases were made in 1983 and 1986, respectively, of the Ramshorn Church and Barony Church - the latter restored in 1989 and converted into a graduation hall) - and in 1987 the acquisition of Marland House (a former British Telecom office block, which was renamed for Hills on his retirement). The "student village" on the eastern third of the campus was further expanded from the mid-1980s onwards.

After Sir Graham's retirement, he was the driving force behind the establishment of the University of the Highlands and Islands. He moved to Inverness to be a full-time advisor to the nascent university. In 2004 he coauthored, with Robin Lingard, the book UHI: The Making of a University, a comprehensive account of the university's creation.

== Professional posts ==
- Imperial College, London: Lecturer in Physical Chemistry, 1949–1962
- University of Southampton: Professor of Physical Chemistry, 1962–1980
- University of Western Ontario: Visiting professor, 1968
- Case Western Reserve University: Visiting professor, 1969
- University of Buenos Aires, Visiting professor, 1977
- University of Strathclyde, Glasgow: Principal and Vice-Chancellor, 1980–1991

== Professional committee work ==
- President of International Society of Electrochemistry, 1983–1985
- Non-Executive Director: Scottish Post Office Bd, 1986–1999
- Member: Council for Science and Technology, 1987–1993
- Scottish Development Agency, 1988–1990
- Member: Council for National Academic Awards, 1988–1993
- Glasgow Action Partnership, 1989–1990
- Scottish governor of the BBC, 1989–1994
- Design Council, 1989–1990
- Society of Chemical Industry, 1991–1993
- Scottish Enterprise, 1991–1993
- Design and Industries Association, 1992–1996
- Chairman of the Council of Quarrier's Homes, 1992–1997
- Chairman of the Ness Foundation (formerly Highland Psychiatric Res.), 1998–2003

== Professional fellowships ==
- Fellow of the Royal Society of Edinburgh, 1990
- Fellow of Scottish Vocational Education Council, 1989
- Fellow of the Royal Society of Arts, 1978
- Fellow of the Royal Society of Chemistry, 1950

== Professional honours ==
- Hon. DSc: Southampton, 1984; Lisbon, 1994
- Hon. ScD: Technical University of Lodz, Poland, 1984
- Commander, Polish Order of Merit, 1984
- Hon. LLD: Glasgow, 1985; Waterloo, Canada, 1991; Strathclyde, 1991
- Royal Norwegian Order of Merit, 1986
- Hon. Fellow of the Royal Scottish Academy of Music and Drama, 1988
- Hon. Medal, University of Pavia, Italy, 1988
- Hon. Fellow of the Polytechnic of East London, 1991
- Hon. Fellow of the Royal College of Physicians and Surgeons of Glasgow, 1992
- DUniv: Paisley, 1993
- Hon. Fellow of the Chartered Society of Designers, 1996
- Hon. DEd University of Abertay Dundee, 1999

== Publications ==
- Hills, G. J. Reference Electrodes, 1961
- Hills, G. J., Inheritance of Michael Faraday, (University of Southampton), 1964
- Hills, G. J., Polarography, (Macmillan), 1964
- Hills, G. J. (ed.) Electrochemistry: A Review of Chemical Literature: vols 1-3 (Specialist Periodical Reports), (Royal Society of Chemistry), 1970, 71, 73
- Hills, G. J., Transactions of the Faraday Society Articles (Royal Society of Chemistry) (numerous contributions on electrochemistry
- Hills, Graham & Lingard, Robin, UHI: The Making of a University, (Dunedin Academic Press), 2004

== Honors ==
- Honorary degree, University of Pavia, 1988

== Obituaries ==
A list of obituaries available online and accessed 3/8/2015:

- The Royal Society
- The Scotsman. A photograph of Sir Graham is given here
- The Daily Telegraph. A photograph is also given here
- The Independent. This obituary was written by Tam Dalyell), with photograph
- The Herald. This is a letter written to the newspaper
- The Times Higher Education Supplement
- The Royal Society of Chemistry
- The Strathclyde Telegraph. This is the university student newspaper

Academic offices
Preceded by Samuel Curran	Principal and Vice-chancellor; University of Strathclyde; 1980-1991	Succeeded by John Arbuthnott
