= Vans (disambiguation) =

Vans is a shoe and apparel company.

Vans may also refer to:

== Places ==
- Les Vans, a commune in the Ardèche department, France
- Vans Corner, Idaho
- Vans Valley (disambiguation)

== Other ==
- The plural of van, a type of road vehicle
- Vans (name), both a given and surname
- "Vans" (song), by The Pack
- Van's Aircraft, Oregon-based home built aircraft company

== See also ==
- Vons, an American supermarket chain
- Van (disambiguation)
- Vannes (disambiguation)
