= Mrvan =

Mrvan is a surname. Notable people with the surname include:

- Frank J. Mrvan (born 1969), U.S. representative from Indiana, son of Indiana state senator Frank Ed Mrvan Jr.
- Frank Mrvan Jr. (born 1933), U.S. politician, Indiana state senator, father of U.S. federal representative Frank John Mrvan

== See also ==
- Van (surname)
- Marvin (given name)
