= Ness (surname) =

The surname Ness may refer to:

== Politics ==
- Don Ness (born 1974), American politician from Duluth, Minnesota
- James Van Ness (1808–1872), seventh mayor of San Francisco, USA from 1855 to 1856
- Steinar Ness (born 1959), Norwegian politician for the Centre Party

== Arts and entertainment ==
- Evaline Ness (1911–1986), American commercial artist and illustrator for award-winning children's books
- Jennifer Ness (born 1972), English actress best known for her role as murderer Kris Yates in the ITV drama Bad Girls
- Mari Ness (born c. 1971), American poet and author
- Mike Ness (born 1962), American guitarist, vocalist, and chief songwriter for the punk rock band Social Distortion
- Patrick Ness (born 1971), American author, journalist and lecturer
- Tigilau Ness (born c. 1954), Niuean New Zealand activist and reggae artist

== Sports ==
- Aaron Ness (born 1990), American ice hockey people
- Brad Ness (born 1974), Australian wheelchair basketballer
- David Ness (1902–1974), Scottish footballer
- Erin Ness (born 1978), American poker player, former photo producer for Maxim magazine, and television personality
- Harry Ness (1885–1957), a footballer
- Jack Ness (1885–1957), first baseman in Major League Baseball
- Jamie Ness (born 1991), Scottish footballer
- Nate Ness (born 1986), American football cornerback and safety
- Ness Flowers, Welsh former rugby player
- Thormod Ness (born 1972), Norwegian football coach and former player
- Zoe Ness (born 1996), Scottish footballer

== Science and education ==
- Carl Van Ness, curator and historian at the University of Florida
- Immanuel Ness, teaches political science at Brooklyn College of the City University of New York
- Helge Ness (1861–1928), Norwegian botanist
- Norman F. Ness, American physicist

== Other fields ==
- Arlen Ness, American entrepreneur and motorcyclist
- Charles Ness (unknown birth date); senior Royal Air Force officer, Technical Director of the UK Military Aviation Authority (from 2010)
- Charles Ernest Ness (1924–1994), a senior Royal Air Force commander
- Eliot Ness (1903–1957), American Prohibition agent
- Terje Ness (born 1972), Norwegian chef

== See also ==
- Ness (disambiguation)
- Van Ness (disambiguation)
