= Venne =

Venne is a surname. Notable people with the surname include:

- Carl Venne (1946–2009), Native American leader
- James Miles Venne (died 2007), Canadian aboriginal leader
- Joseph Venne (1858–1925), Canadian architect
- Lottie Venne (1852–1928), English actor, comedian and singer
- Michel Venne (born 1960), Canadian journalist and writer
- Muriel Stanley Venne (1937–2024), Canadian Métis community leader and Indigenous rights activist
- Pierrette Venne (born 1945), Canadian politician
- Stéphane Venne (1941–2025), Canadian singer-songwriter and composer

== See also ==
- Vennes
- van de Venne (disambiguation)
- Vanne (disambiguation)
