= Nes =

NES commonly refers to the Nintendo Entertainment System, a video game console.

Nes or NES may also refer to:

== Education ==
- National Education Service, a proposal for the United Kingdom
- New Economic School, in Russia
- New English School (Jordan)
- New English School (Kuwait)
- NHS Education for Scotland, the educational wing of NHS Scotland

== Places ==
=== Faroe Islands ===
- Nes, Eysturoy, a village in Nes Municipality on the island of Eysturoy
- Nes Municipality (Faroe Islands), a municipality on the island of Eysturoy
- Nes, Vágur, a village in Vágur municipality on the island of Suðuroy

=== Norway ===
- Nes, Hole, a village in Hole Municipality in Buskerud county
- Nes, Innlandet, a peninsula in Ringsaker Municipality in Innlandet county
  - Tingnes (or simply Nes), a village on the Nes peninsula in Ringsaker Municipality in Innlandet county
- Nes, Vestland, a village in Luster Municipality in Vestland county
- Nes, Ådal, a village in Ringerike Municipality in Buskerud county
- Nes, Ørland, a village in Ørland Municipality in Trøndelag county
- Nes, the former name of Nesbyen Municipality, a municipality in Buskerud county
- Nes Municipality (Akershus), a municipality in Akershus county
- Nes Municipality (Hedmark), a former municipality in the old Hedmark county
- Nes Municipality (Sør-Trøndelag), a former municipality in the old Sør-Trøndelag county
- Nes Municipality (Vest-Agder), a former municipality in the old Vest-Agder county
- Nes Church (disambiguation)

=== Netherlands ===
- Nes, Ameland, a village in the municipality of Ameland
- Nes (Amsterdam), an old street in central Amsterdam
- Nes, Heerenveen, a village in the municipality of Heerenveen
- Nes, Dongeradeel, a village in the municipality of Dongeradeel
- Nes (Schagen), a village in the municipality of Schagen
- Nes aan de Amstel, a village in the municipality of Amstelveen
- De Nes, a village in the municipality of Texel

=== Russia ===
- Nes, Russia, a village in Nenets Autonomous Okrug

=== Syria ===
- Rojava, officially the Autonomous Administration of North and East Syria (NES), a de facto autonomous region

=== Africa ===
- North Eastern State of Somalia, a Somali federal member state

== Science and technology ==
- Nes (fish), a genus of gobies in subfamily Gobiinae
- Natural evolution strategies, a method for numerical optimization
- Natural Earth satellite, a natural satellite of Earth, such as the moon
- Nestin (protein), a human gene and protein
- Nuclear export signal, an amino acid sequence causing a protein to be exported from the nucleus to the cytoplasm
- Night eating syndrome, an eating disorder
- Netscape Enterprise Server, the former name of the Sun Java System Web Server

== Organisations ==
- Nashville Electric Service, power provider for Nashville, Tennessee
- National Energy Systems, a former name of Eco Marine Power
- Neurootological and Equilibriometric Society, a German medical society
- New England Southern Railroad, which formerly used reporting mark NES, now NEGS
- Voter News Service, also known as News Election Service

== People ==
- Aert Jansse van Nes (1626–1693), Dutch naval commander, brother of Jan
- Eeke van Nes (born 1969), Dutch rower
- Hadriaan van Nes (born 1942), Dutch rower
- Jan Jansse van Nes (1631–1680), Dutch admiral, brother of Aert
- Johan van Nes (died 1650), Dutch Golden Age painter
- Nathaniel Erskine-Smith (born 1984), Canadian politician
- Nuno Espírito Santo (born 1974), Portuguese footballer and coach

== Other uses ==
- National Election Studies, an academic survey performed after every US election by the University of Michigan
- National Equality Standard, an initiative created by EY
- New Economic System, East German economic policy

== See also ==
- NESOI (Not Elsewhere Specified or Indicated), used in categorizing cargo items
- Ness (disambiguation)
