= Vann =

Vann may refer to:

- Salvadora oleoides is a small bushy evergreen tree found in India, Pakistan, and southern Iran
- Vann Peak, Marie Byrd Land, Antarctica

== People with the name ==
- Vann (surname), an English surname (including a list of people with the surname)
- Vann McElroy (born 1960), former National Football League player
- Ho Vann, politician elected to the National Assembly of Cambodia in 2003
- Vann Molyvann (1926-2017), Cambodian architect
- John Paul Vann (1924-1972), U.S. civilian commander during the Vietnam War
- L. Vann Pettaway (born c. 1957), former men's basketball coach at Alabama Agricultural and Mechanical University
- C. Vann Woodward (1908–1999), American historian

== See also ==
- Van (disambiguation)
