= Bernard Vann =

English recipient of the Victoria Cross

The Reverend Bernard William Vann
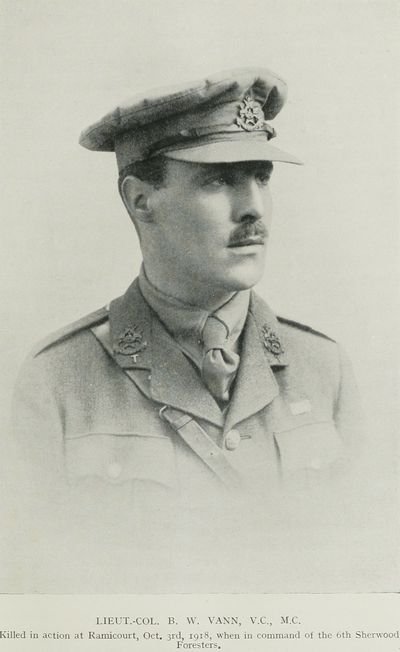
- Born: 9 July 1887; Rushden, Northamptonshire, England
- Died: 3 October 1918 (aged 31); Ramicourt, France
- Burial place: Bellicourt British Cemetery
- Military career
- Allegiance: United Kingdom
- Branch: British Army
- Service years: 1914–1918
- Rank: Lieutenant Colonel
- Units: Sherwood Foresters
- Conflicts: World War I
- Awards: Victoria Cross; Military Cross & Bar; Croix de Guerre avec Palme (France)
- Other work: Footballer

Lieutenant Colonel Bernard William Vann, VC, MC & Bar (9 July 1887 – 3 October 1918) was an English recipient of the Victoria Cross (VC), the highest and most prestigious award for gallantry in the face of the enemy that can be awarded to British and Commonwealth forces. Also an ordained priest, he was the only cleric of the Church of England to be awarded the VC in the First World War for his actions as a combatant.

== Early life ==
Bernard Vann
Personal information
- Positions: Outside left; centre forward

Senior career*
Years	Team	Apps	(Gls)
- Hugglescote United
- Irthlingborough Town
- Northampton Town
1906	Burton United	5	(1)
1906	Derby County	3	(0)
1907	Leicester Fosse	0	(0)
- Mansfield Wesley
- * Club domestic league appearances and goals

Vann was born on 9 July 1887 in Rushden, in Northamptonshire, where his parents, Alfred George Collins Vann and Hannah Elizabeth Vann were teachers. He attended Chichele College, Higham Ferrers, where his father was headmaster.

Vann was a keen footballer who played for amateur teams at Hugglescote United, Irthlingborough, and Northampton Town. During the 1906/1907 season, he played for Burton United, then a League club. He made five appearances that season and then joined Derby County, making the first of his three league appearances for the club on 23 March 1907. Later that year, he played for Leicester Fosse, playing in two non-league games for the club.

From 1907 to 1910, Vann was a student at Jesus College, Cambridge, reading History. His brother, Arthur Harrison Allard Vann, matriculated at Jesus in 1909, aged 25. While at the University of Cambridge, Bernard served in the Officers' Training Corps as a sergeant. During this time, he played for Mansfield Wesley. In 1910, his final year of studies, he was a hockey blue for the university.

After graduation, Vann taught at Ashby-de-la-Zouch Grammar School in Leicestershire but then decided on a career in the priesthood. He was ordained a deacon in the Church of England in October 1910 and, in December 1911, he was ordained as a priest. He was licensed as a curate at St Barnabas' Church in the New Humberstone suburb of Leicester and then at St Saviour's Church in the same city. In January 1913, he became chaplain and assistant master at Wellingborough School.

== First World War ==
On the outbreak of the First World War, Vann volunteered as a military chaplain but, frustrated by difficulties and delays, enlisted in the infantry instead, initially in 28th (County of London) Battalion of The London Regiment, (The Artists' Rifles). Shortly afterwards, he was commissioned into the 1/8th Battalion, The Sherwood Foresters (The Nottinghamshire and Derbyshire Regiment) on 1 September 1914.

With his battalion, Vann served in the Ypres Salient for several months from February 1915. In an action at Kemmel on 24 April 1915, a trench he was in was bombed. Although wounded, he organised the defence and rescued buried men under heavy fire. He refused to leave his post until ordered to by his superiors. He was promoted to lieutenant on 26 April 1915 and two months later was made a temporary captain.

Vann further distinguished himself in fighting at Hooge in late July to early August, assisting another officer in holding the line and leading patrols to the German trenches, gathering intelligence. For his actions over this period, he was awarded the Military Cross (MC). On 25 September 1915, his brother Arthur was killed at the Battle of Loos. The following month, Vann was wounded during fighting at the Hohenzollern Redoubt which resulted in him being sent to England for treatment. He returned to the front in June 1916, his captain's rank having been made substantive. He soon was promoted to acting major.

In August 1916 Vann received a bar to his previously awarded MC "for conspicuous gallantry in action. He led a daring raid against the enemy's trenches, himself taking five prisoners and displaying great courage and determination. He has on many previous occasions done fine work." Later in the year, suffering neuritis in his neck, he was sent to England for medical treatment. Declared fit in March 1917, he was sent on a command training course and returned to the front six months later as commander of 2/6th Battalion Sherwood Foresters. During this time, he was awarded the Croix de Guerre. He was promoted to acting lieutenant colonel the following month. On 27 December 1917, at St Paul's Church, Knightsbridge, he married Doris Victoria Strange-Beck, a Canadian nurse working at a hospital in England.

For the first part of 1918, Vann spent periods in hospital or on leave. In June 1918, Vann took over command of 1/6th Battalion Sherwood Foresters. On 29 September 1918, during the Battle of St Quentin Canal, he led his battalion across the canal through thick fog and under heavy fire. He secured his troops' advance by rushing up to the firing line and leading the advance forward himself. Of his battalion, nearly 30 men were killed and over a hundred others were wounded in this engagement. A few days later, on 3 October 1918, he was again leading his battalion, this time across the Beaurevoir-Bonsomme Line, near Ramicourt, when he was killed in action by a sniper.

For his actions of 29 September 1918, he was awarded the Victoria Cross (VC). The VC, instituted in 1856, was the highest award for valour that could be bestowed on a soldier of the British Empire. The citation for his VC, the only one of the First World War to be awarded to a cleric of the Church of England performing a combat role, read as follows:

For most conspicuous bravery, devotion to duty and fine leadership during the attack at Bellenglise and Lehaucourt, on September 29th, 1918. He led his battalion with great skill across the Canal de Saint-Quentin through a very thick fog and under heavy fire from field and machine guns. On reaching the high ground above Bellenglise the whole attack was held up by fire of all descriptions from the front and right flank. Realising that everything depended on the advance going forward with the barrage, Col. Vann rushed up to the firing line and with the greatest gallantry led the line forward. By his prompt action and absolute contempt for danger the whole situation was changed, the men were encouraged and the line swept forward. Later, he rushed a field-gun single-handed and knocked out three of the detachment. The success of the day was in no small degree due to the splendid gallantry and fine leadership displayed by this officer. Lt. Col. Vann, who had on all occasions set the highest example of valour, was killed near Ramicourt on 3rd October, 1918, when leading his battalion in attack.

— The London Gazette No. 31067, 14 December 1918

He was survived by his wife, who was pregnant with their son. King George V presented Vann's VC to his widow in a ceremony at Buckingham Palace on 26 November 1919.

Vann was initially buried near where he was killed but in 1920, his remains were moved to Bellicourt British Cemetery in Aisne, France. The inscription on his headstone, "A Great Priest Who Is In His Days Pleased God", was written by the Bishop of Peterborough.

== Medals and legacy ==
Vann's medals which, in addition to the VC and the MC & bar, included the 1914–15 Star, the British War Medal, and the Victory Medal remained in the family for many years. In May 2010, the VC and the MC and bar were purchased by Lord Ashcroft and are displayed at the Lord Ashcroft Gallery in the Imperial War Museum.

Several memorials to Vann's memory exist. There is a plaque on the house where he was born in Rushden. At Coates, Gloucestershire, where his family moved after the death of his father, he is listed on the roll of honour at St Matthew's Church and on the village war memorial. At the Church of St Mary Magdalene, Newark-on-Trent where the 8th Sherwood Foresters are commemorated, there is a memorial. A memorial plaque survives in the former St Barnabas' Church, Leicester, where he was curate.

On 8 November 2014, a plaque honouring Vann and five other Derby County players killed during the First World War was unveiled outside the club's Pride Park Stadium.

On 29 September 2018, his grandsons unveiled a commemorative stone in Rushden. His grandson Michael unveiled a memorial plaque in the chapel at Wellingborough School on 10 November 2018.

The Vann Fellowship, named in memory of Vann, was established at Durham University in 2018 to promote the study of Christianity and the armed forces.
