= The Van =

The Van may refer to:

- The Van (1977 film), a teenage comedy film by Sam Grossman
- The Van (novel), a novel (1991) by Roddy Doyle
- The Van (1996 film), a film by Stephen Frears, based on Doyle's novel
- "The Van", an episode of the British sitcom Oh, Doctor Beeching!
- "The Van", a song by New Jersey rock band Bleachers

== See also ==
- Van (disambiguation)
