= Nes Church =

Nes Church may refer to:

- Nes Church ruins, the preserved church ruins of the medieval Nes Church building in Nes Municipality in Akershus county, Norway
- Nes Church, Bjugn, a church in Ørland Municipality in Trøndelag country, Norway
- Nes Church (Buskerud), a church in the Ringerike Municipality in Buskerud county, Norway
- Nes Church (Gran), a church in Brandbu in Gran Municipality in Innlandet county, Norway
- Nes Church (Nesbyen), a church used as a model to restore Høyjord Stave Church
- Nes Church (Ringsaker), a church in Ringsaker Municipality in Innlandet county, Norway
- Nes Church (Telemark), a church in Midt-Telemark Municipality in Telemark county, Norway
- Nes Church (Vestland), a church in Luster Municipality in Vestland county, Norway
