= John Arbuthnott (microbiologist) =

Scottish microbiologist (1939–2023)

Sir John Arbuthnott PRSE FRCPSG FMedSci FRCPath
- Born: John Peebles Arbuthnott; 8 April 1939
- Died: 21 February 2023 (aged 83)
- Education: Hyndland Senior Secondary School; University of Glasgow; Trinity College, Dublin
- Occupation: Microbiologist

Sir John Peebles Arbuthnott (8 April 1939 – 21 February 2023) was a Scottish microbiologist who was Principal of the University of Strathclyde. He succeeded Lord Wilson of Tillyorn as President of The Royal Society of Edinburgh in October 2011 and was succeeded by Dame Jocelyn Bell Burnell in October 2014.

Arbuthnott served as Principal and Vice Chancellor of the University of Strathclyde between 1991 and 2000, succeeding Sir Graham Hills.

== Life and career ==
Arbuthnott was educated at Hyndland Senior Secondary School, the University of Glasgow (BSc, PhD), and Trinity College, Dublin (MA, ScD). In 1998, he was made a Knight Bachelor for services to education.

In December 1997, while Principal and Vice-Chancellor of the University of Strathclyde, Arbuthnott chaired the National Review of Resource Allocation ("The Arbuthnott Report" and "the Arbuthnott Review". The principal task of the independent review was to consider how money was allocated annually to fund the 14 Scottish NHS Boards. The resulting mechanism, known as the Arbuthnott Formula, assesses key indicators of population, inequality and deprivation of the areas covered by each of the boards to allocate money.

Arbuthnott was chair of the Arbuthnott Commission set up in 2004 to consider the consequences of having four separate voting systems for elections in Scotland and also different boundaries for Holyrood and Westminster constituencies.

Sir John Arbuthnott died on 21 February 2023, at the age of 83.

== Professional posts ==
- University of Glasgow:
  - Assistant lecturer, 1960–1963
  - Lecturer, 1963–1967
- New York Medical Center: Visiting lecturer, 1966–1967
- Royal Society of London: Research fellow, 1968–72
- University of Glasgow: Senior lecturer, Department of Bacteriology, 1972–1975
- Trinity College, Dublin:
  - Professor of microbiology 1976-1988
  - Bursar, 1983–86
- University of Nottingham: Professor of microbiology 1988-1991
- University of Strathclyde, Glasgow: Principal and Vice-Chancellor, 1991–2000

== Professional committee work ==
- Chairman, Expert Group on Labour's plan for National Care Service
- Chairman, Joint Information Systems Committee, 1993–98
- Chairman, Greater Glasgow Health Board, November 2002-
- Chairman, Commission Report on Boundary Differences and Voting Systems, 2005-6
- Convener, Committee of Scottish Higher Education Principals, 1994–1996
- Convener, National Review of Allocation of Health Resources in Scotland, 1997–1999
- Vice Chairman, CVCP, 1997–99
- Dr Campbell Christie and Arbuthnott [reports on public service delivery and resource allocation]
- Secretary-Treasurer, Carnegie Trust for the Universities of Scotland, 2000-
- Member of the council, Society of General Microbiology 1981–1986, (senior ed 1980–1984, treasurer 1987–1992)
- Meetings secretary, Federation of European Microbiology Societies, 1986–1990
- Member, Microbiological Safety of Food Committee, 1989–1990
- Member, AFRC Animal Research Board, 1989–1992
- Member, Public Health Laboratory Service Board, 1991–1997
- Member, DTI Multimedia Advisory Group, 1994–1996
- Member, Educational Counselling Service Board, British Council, 1995–1996
- Member, Glasgow Development Agency, 1995-
- Member, National Committee of Inquiry into Higher Education, 1996–97
- Member, Scottish Science Trust, 1999
- Member, Pathological Society

== Professional honours ==
- Honorary fellow, Trinity College, Dublin 1992
- MRIA 1985
- FSB 1988
- FRSA 1989
- FRSE 1993
- FIIB 1993
- FRCPath 1995
- Honorary degree of Lodz University of Technology, Poland, May 1995
- Hon FRCPGlasg
- St Mungo Prize 2010
- Hon Doctor of Science St Margaret University, Edinburgh, July 2000

== Publications ==
- Isoelectric Focusing. 1975.
- The Determinants of Bacterial and Viral Pathogenicity. 1983.
- Foodborne Illness: a Lancet Review. 1991.
- Breaking The Mould. 2015.

Academic offices
Preceded by Graham John Hills	Principal and Vice-chancellor; University of Strathclyde; 1991-2000	Succeeded by Andrew Hamnett
Medical appointments
Preceded by Professor David L Hamblen CBE	Chairman; NHS Greater Glasgow and Clyde Board; 2002-2007	Succeeded by Andrew Robertson OBE
