= Vans Valley =

Vans Valley may refer to:

- Vans Valley, Georgia, an unincorporated community in Floyd County
- Vans Valley, Ohio, an unincorporated community in Delaware County
