= Donald Vann =

Native American painter

- Born: 1949 (age 76–77); Stilwell, Oklahoma
- Citizenship: Cherokee Nation
- Known for: Painting
- Style: Cherokee, Southern Plains, and animal imagery
- Website: http://www.donaldvann.com/

Donald Vann is a Cherokee artist from Oklahoma known for painting detailed landscapes with Native American subjects. Vann conveys the traditions and culture of his tribe through soft lines and colors. He has exhibited his work throughout the U.S. and abroad, winning numerous awards for his mystical paintings.

== Early life ==
Donald Vann was born outside of Stilwell, Oklahoma in 1949, where he was raised. Both of his grandfathers inspired him and affected his talent early on in his childhood. Vann's maternal grandfather was a holy man, having a great knowledge of the spiritual world and medicines. His paternal grandfather had a love for the mountains and hunting, a passion that he shared with Donald. In the fifth grade, Vann's grade school teacher paid him a small sum to paint religious pieces for a project, and event that started his interest in professional artistry. During his childhood, Vann's family could not afford to provide him with art supplies, so he melted crayons for paint and constructed his own paintbrushes.

Years later, Vann was introduced to Jerome Tiger. He and his agent Nettie Wheeler profoundly impacted Vann's artistic development. Vann began to meet with Tiger in order to develop his talent, taking a time off only to earn a GED through Job Corps. Immediately upon his return, Vann took up his lessons with Jerome and Nettie. Soon after, Jerome Tiger died when Vann was only 15 years old. Nettie Wheeler became Vann's agent and started selling Vann's work all over the country.

Vann served in the Vietnam War and returned home in 1973. When he returned, Nettie's health was failing and Vann took up with a man from Austin, Texas. The two started their own company down in Austin called Nowotahee Galleries and he served as Vann's agent for over forty years.

== Style ==
Vann's early style was highly influenced by Jerome Tiger's work. He paints very detailed landscapes as well as a mixture of Cherokee, Plains, and animal imagery. His ethereal skies, detailed landscapes and renderings of the human figure invite the viewer to see the beauty of the spirit through its physicality. Vann utilizes the airbrush to achieve a smooth, clean, brush stroke-less aesthetic to his paintings.

== Exhibitions and awards ==
Vann has exhibited his work all over the United States and abroad and has received numerous awards. After forty one years in Texas, Vann moved to Tahlequah, Oklahoma where he set up a new gallery in which to display his artwork.
