= Van Ness =

Van Ness may refer to:

== People ==
- Bethann Beall Faris Van Ness (1902–1993), American writer, YWCA executive
- Cornelius P. Van Ness (1782–1852), Governor of Vermont, judge and diplomat
- Frederick Van Ness Bradley (1898–1947), U.S. Representative from Michigan
- George Van Ness Lothrop (1817–1897), Michigan politician
- James Van Ness (1808–1872), son of Cornelius P. Van Ness, Mayor of San Francisco (1855–1856)
- John Peter Van Ness (1769–1846), U.S. Representative from New York and Mayor of Washington, D.C. (1830–1834)
- Jonathan Van Ness (born 1987), American television personality
- Lukas Van Ness (born 2001), American football player
- Marcia Van Ness (1782–1832), American socialite
- Michael E. Van Ness (born 1974), American astronomer at the Lowell Observatory and discoverer of comets
- Philip van Ness Myers (1846–1937), American historian
- William P. Van Ness (1778–1826), United States District Judge

== Places ==
- Van Ness–UDC station, a subway station in Washington, D.C.
- Forest Hills (Washington, D.C.), frequently referred to as "Van Ness", served by the Van Ness–UDC metro station
- Van Ness Avenue in San Francisco, California, named for James Van Ness
  - Van Ness Bus Rapid Transit, a transit project on Van Ness Avenue
  - Van Ness station a subway station on Van Ness Avenue
- Van Ness Avenue Elementary School, Los Angeles
- Van Ness Mausoleum, Washington, D.C., constructed for the wife of John Peter Van Ness

== Other ==
- Van Ness' Regiment of Militia, a New York unit in the American Revolutionary War

== See also ==
- Van Nes, a Dutch surname
- Vanness Wu (b. 1978), Taiwanese-American actor and singer
- Carol Vaness (b. 1952), American soprano
- Vannes (disambiguation)
- Van (disambiguation)
- Ness (disambiguation)
