= Ness (given name) =

- Gender: Unisex

Origin
- Origin: Scottish
- Meaning: From the headland

Other names
- See also: Nestor, Irnes

Ness is a unisex given name, which means "from the headland".

== People ==
- Ness Edwards (1897–1968), Welsh Labour Party politician
- Ness Flowers, Welsh rugby player in the 1970s and '80s
- Ness Murby (born 1985), Canadian athlete
- Ness Wadia (born 1970), Indian businessman
- Ness Zamir (born 1990), Israeli footballer

== Fictional characters ==
- Ness, the protagonist of EarthBound, the second installment in the Mother series. However, this is likely unrelated to the Scottish name, as Ness is an anagram for SNES, the console EarthBound was released on.
- Ness, the waiter at Sparky's Diner in Five Nights at Freddy's.
