= Ella Brockway Avann =

American educator and writer (1853–1899)

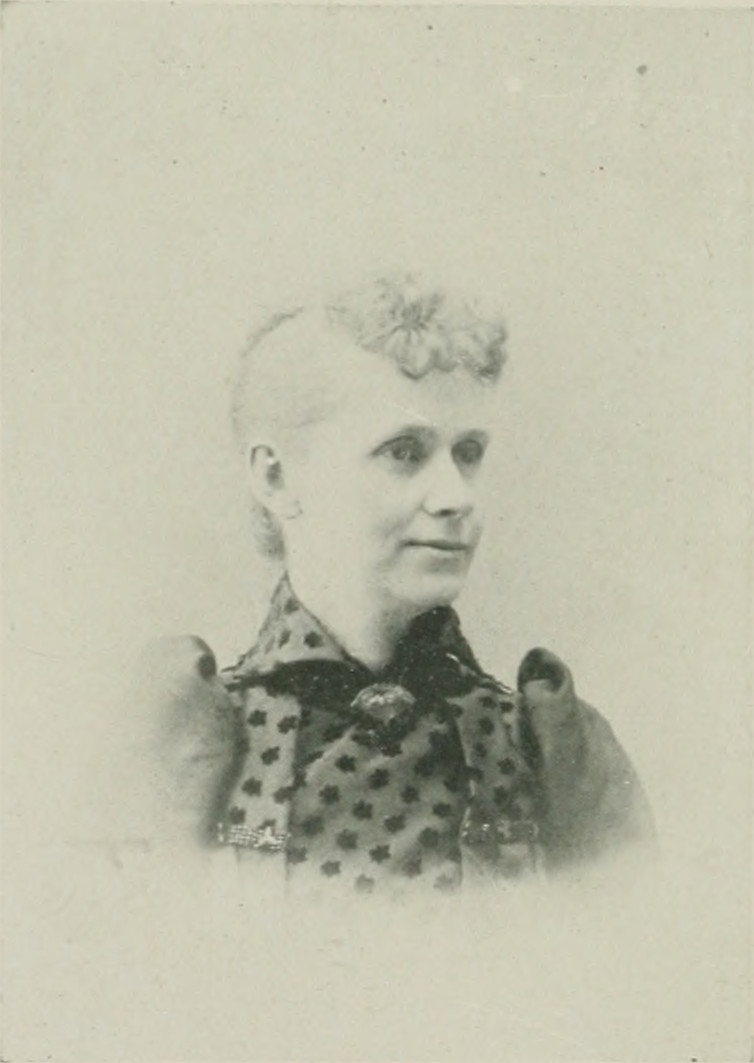
- Photo in A Woman of the Century
- Born: Ella Eleura Hoag; May 20, 1853; Newaygo, Michigan, U.S.
- Died: October 22, 1899 (aged 46); Toledo, Ohio, U.S.
- Resting place: Riverside Cemetery, Albion, Michigan, U.S.
- Education: Albion College
- Occupations: educator; writer
- Spouses: Hamline Brockway (m. 1873; died 1887); Joseph M. Avann (m. 1891)
- Children: 2

Ella Brockway Avann (née Hoag; after first marriage, Brockway; after second marriage, Avann; May 20, 1853 – October 22, 1899) was a 19th-century American educator and writer. After graduating from Albion College of Michigan, she subsequently became preceptress of that institution. She filled the chair of English literature and also lectured on the history of music. For 10 years, she was president of the Woman's Foreign Missionary society. Avann made frequent contributions to the religious press. She held official positions in various literary, social and benevolent societies.

== Early life and education ==
Ella Eleura Hoag was born in Newaygo, Michigan, May 20, 1853. Her father, the Rev. G. W. Hoag, born in Charlotte, Vermont, was of Quaker parentage and a pioneer in the Methodist Episcopal Church in Michigan, having gone to that State in boyhood. Her mother, Elizabeth Bruce Hoag, from Rochester, New York, was gifted with pen and voice, and was a high official in the Woman's Foreign Missionary Society of her church. At the age of 12, Avann went to Albion College, Albion, Michigan, and was graduated in 1871.

== Career ==
In 1873, she married L. Hamline Brockway, of Albion, where they lived for 15 years, when his election as county clerk caused their removal to Marshall, Michigan.

In 1885, Avann, then Mrs. Brockway, thinking "some good should come as the hours go by", counseling with Mrs. A. G. Dickey, organized "the Monday club" in Marshall and was elected its first president. After her husband's death in August 1887, Mrs. Brockway (with her son, Porter Bruce Brockway, aged 12, and daughter, Ruth Brockway, aged 6) returned to Albion.

In January 1889, she became preceptress of Albion College, displaying great executive ability. She had great influence over the young women of the college and exercised that power without apparent effort. She led the department of English literature, and also lectured on the history of music. For ten years, she was president of the Woman's Foreign Missionary Society of Albion district.

In June 1891, she resigned her position in Albion College and on August 11, 1891, she married Rev. Joseph M. Avann, of Findlay, Ohio. She was a pleasing speaker, and occasionally she gave a literary address or spoke in behalf of some benevolent cause away from home. She made frequent contributions to the religious press, and was connected with various literary, social and benevolent societies, holding official positions.

== Personal life ==
Taken with convulsions, Avann died suddenly at her home in Toledo, Ohio on October 22, 1899, after an illness of 30 hours.
