= Vannes (disambiguation) =

Vannes may refer to:

== Places ==
- Vannes, Vannes, Morbihan, Brittany, France; a commune and city
  - Vannes station, a rail station in Vannes
  - Vannes Airfield (IATA airport code: VNE, ICAO airport code: LFRV), Golfe du Morbihan, France
  - Golfe du Morbihan - Vannes Agglomération, the Vannes metropolitan area
- Roman Catholic Diocese of Vannes, Vannes, Morbihan, Brittany, France
  - Vannes Cathedral, Vannes, Morbihan, Brittany, France
- Arrondissement of Vannes, Morbihan, Brittany, France; an arrondissement containing Vannes
  - Canton of Vannes-1, Morbihan, Brittany, France; a commune containing Vannes
  - Canton of Vannes-2, Morbihan, Brittany, France
  - Canton of Vannes-3, Morbihan, Brittany, France
- Vannes-le-Châtel (Vannes Castle), Meurthe-et-Moselle, France; a commune
- Vannes-sur-Cosson (Vannes-upon-Cosson), Loiret, France; a commune

== People ==
- Count of Vannes, a title for an influential ruler in Brittany, based in what is now Vannes, Morbihan, France
- Peter Vannes (died 1563) Italian Catholic churchman
- René Vannes (1888–1956) Belgian musicologist

== Sports ==
- Vannes OC, a soccer team based in Vannes, Morbihan, France
- Rugby Club Vannes, a rugby union team based in Vannes, Morbihan, France
- Auray-Vannes Half Marathon through Vannes, Morbihan, France

== Other uses ==
- Sieges of Vannes (1342), four sieges between John of Montfort and Charles of Blois

== See also ==
- Vennes
- Vanes Martirosyan (born 1986) Armenian-American pro-wrestler
- Vanness Wu (born 1978) Taiwanese-American actor
- Carol Vaness (born 1952) American soprano
- van Nes (surname)
- Vanne (disambiguation)
- Van Ness (disambiguation)
- Vans (disambiguation)
