= Van de Venne =

van de Venne is a surname. Notable people with the surname include:

- Adriaen van de Venne (1589–1662), Dutch Golden Age painter
- Delphine Van de Venne (born 1974), Belgian sprint canoer
- Jan van de Venne, Flemish Baroque painter

== See also ==
- Venne (disambiguation)
