= Arthur Vann =

English footballer

Personal information
- Full name: Arthur Harrison Allard Vann
- Date of birth: 1 May 1884
- Place of birth: Bugbrooke, England
- Date of death: 25 September 1915 (aged 31)
- Place of death: Loos-en-Gohelle, France
- Position: Outside left

Senior career*
| Years | Team | Apps | (Gls) |
- Northampton Town
| 1906 | Burton United | 2 | (1) |
| 1907 | Derby County | 0 | (0) |
- * Club domestic league appearances and goals

Arthur Harrison Allard Vann (1 May 1884 – 25 September 1915) was a British Army officer killed in the First World War. He had been a professional football outside left who appeared in the Football League for Burton United.

== Personal life ==
Vann was born on 1 May 1884 in Bugbrooke, Northamptonshire. His parents, Alfred George Collins Vann and Hannah Elizabeth Vann were teachers and his younger brother was Bernard William Vann. He attended Chichele College, Higham Ferrers, where his father was headmaster.

Vann was commissioned as a second lieutenant in the 5th Battalion, The King's Own (Yorkshire Light Infantry) on 29 June 1908. This was a Territorial Force unit. He resigned his commission in August 1911.

Both Vann and his brother Bernard attended Jesus College, Cambridge. Bernard matriculated in 1907 and Arthur in 1909, aged 25. He graduated in 1913.

In the First World War, Vann was again commissioned in the Army as a temporary lieutenant on 1 October 1914. He served in the 28th (County of London) Battalion of The London Regiment, (The Artists' Rifles) and the West Yorkshire Regiment during the first year of the war. He held the rank of captain and was adjutant of the 12th Battalion of the West Yorkshire Regiment when he was killed at the Battle of Loos on 25 September 1915. His body was not recovered and he is commemorated on the Loos Memorial.

Bernard Vann also served, winning a VC and an MC and Bar, before being killed in action in France on 3 October 1918.
