= Van (surname) =

Van is a surname. Notable people with the surname include:

- David Van (born 1964), Australian politician, a Liberal Senator for Victoria
- Jessika Van, American actress
- Lindsey Van (born 1984), American ski jumper
- Marina de Van (born 1971), French film director, screenwriter and actress
- Tomiko Van (born 1979), Japanese singer and actress
- Wally Van (1880–1974), American actor and film director of the silent era

== See also ==
- Van (disambiguation)
- Vann (surname)
