= Van (given name) =

Van is a masculine given name and nickname, sometimes a short form of Donovan, Evan, Ivan, Vance, or the feminine Vanessa. It may refer to:

== People ==
=== Given name ===
- Van Conner (1967-2023), American musician
- Van Alexander (1915–2015), American bandleader, arranger and composer
- Van T. Barfoot (1919–2012), American Army officer, Medal of Honor recipient
- Van D. Bell (1918–2009), American Marine officer, recipient of two Navy Crosses
- Van Fillinger, American football player
- Van Green (born 1951), American football player
- Van Johnson (1916–2008), American actor
- Van Johnson (racing driver) (1927–1959), American racing driver
- Van Mathias (born 2000), American swimmer
- Van Miller (1927–2015), American sports announcer
- Van Lingle Mungo (1911–1985), American baseball player
- Van Nelson (born 1945), American long-distance runner
- Van Patrick (1916–1974), American sportscaster
- Van Snider (born 1963), American baseball player
- Van Tiffin (born 1965), American football placekicker
- Van Van Wey (1924–1991), former NASCAR driver
- Van Winitsky (born 1959), American tennis player

=== Nickname ===
- Van Braxton, 21st century American politician
- Van Cliburn (1934–2013), American pianist
- Ivan R. Gates (1890–1932), American aviator and entrepreneur, founder of the barnstorming Gates Flying Circus
- Van Hansis (born 1981), American actor
- Van Heflin (1908–1971), American actor
- Van Jefferson (born 1996), American football player
- Van Jones (born 1968), American news commentator and activist
- Van Morrison (born 1945), Northern Irish singer, songwriter, musician and producer
- Willard Van Orman Quine (1908–2000), American philosopher and logician

== Fictional characters ==
- Van, from the Pixar film Cars; see List of Cars characters
- Van, a humanoid robot from the collection "BT21"; see [[List of BT21 characters #VAN ]]
- Van, from the PlayStation game Chrono Cross; see Characters of Chrono Cross
- Van, from the anime Gun X Sword; see List of Gun Sword characters
- Van Arkride, from the Trails series
- Van Fanel, from the anime The Vision of Escaflowne; see List of The Vision of Escaflowne characters
- Van Flyheight, from the anime Zoids: Chaotic Century
- Van Garg, one of Gargamel's incarnations and the final antagonist appearing in The Smurfs
- Van Hohenheim, from the Fullmetal Alchemist franchise; see List of Fullmetal Alchemist characters
- Van Kleiss from Generator Rex
- Van Montgomery, from the TV series Reba; see List of Reba characters
- Van Veen, main character of Vladimir Nabokov's Ada or Ardor: A Family Chronicle
- Van Wilder, protagonist of the film National Lampoon's Van Wilder
- Van Yamano (Ban Yamano in the Japanese version), a main protagonist from the game and anime Little Battlers Experience
- Vanessa "Van" Palmer, a character on the TV Series Yellowjackets
