= Sir Gammer Vans =

Sir Gammer Vans is an English fairy tale collected by Joseph Jacobs in More English Fairy Tales.

It is Aarne-Thompson 1965, Lying Tales, and includes an episode of 1890, the lucky shot.

== Synopsis ==
In a sequence of events most of which are self-contradictory, the narrator goes to visit Sir Gammer Vans in his house — "a brick house, built entirely of flints, standing alone by itself in the middle of sixty or seventy others just like it" — is fed breakfast — "a slice of beer, and a cup of cold veal" — and goes hunting with him. He shoots a deer, breaking its ribs without hurting it, finds the arrow in a beehive, and shoots partridges when they jump out — 18 they say, but he claims 36.

== Motifs ==
The references to arrows and venison point to its being an old tale, which may indicate the "sir" is a title for a clerical honor, rather than a knight.
