= Nes Church (Vestland) =

Church in Vestland, Norway

- Nes kyrkje
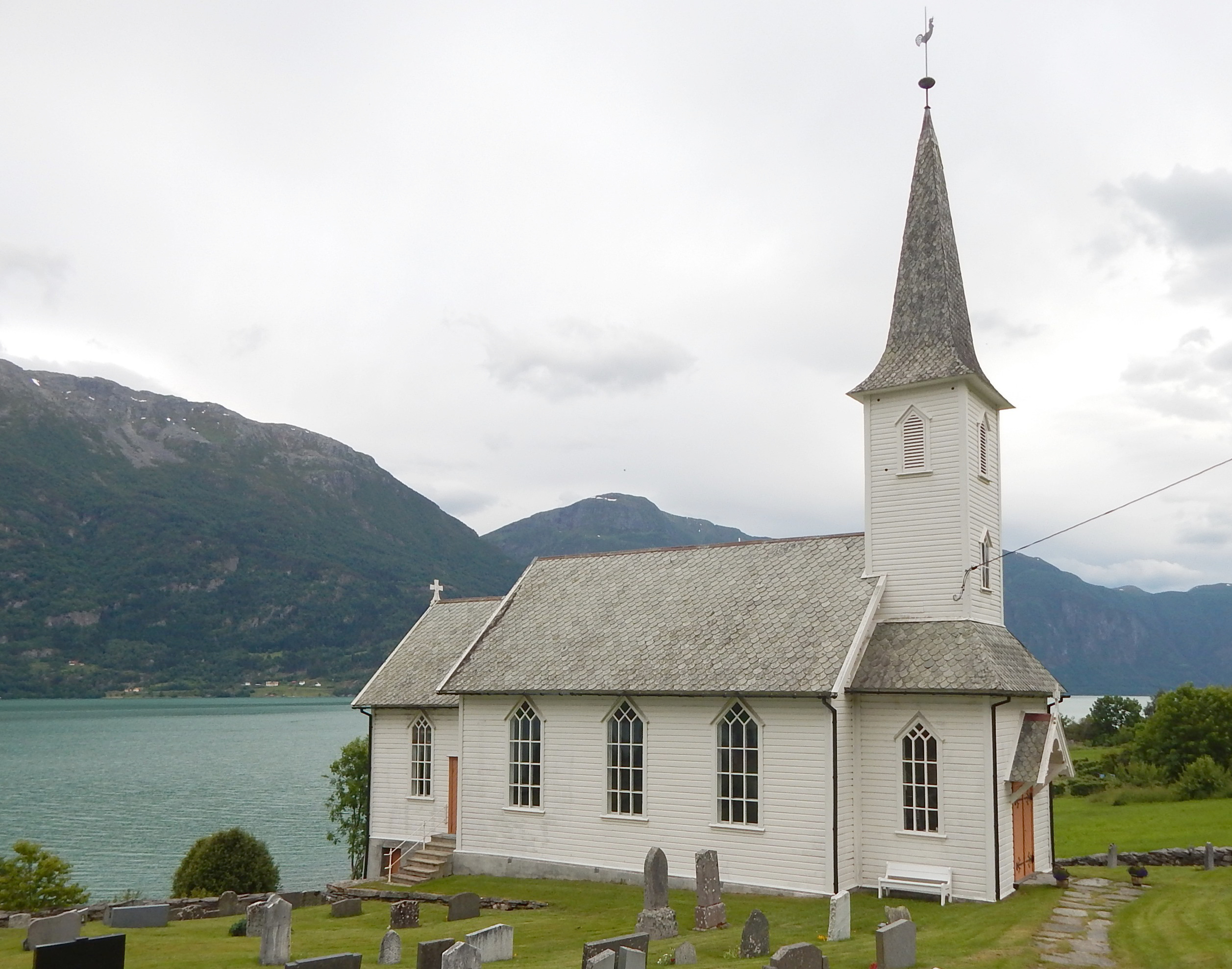
- View of the church
- Nes Church
- 61°23′13″N 7°22′03″E
- Location: Luster Municipality, Vestland
- Country: Norway
- Denomination: Church of Norway
- Churchmanship: Evangelical Lutheran

History
- Status: Parish church
- Founded: 14th century
- Consecrated: 1836

Architecture
- Functional status: Active
- Architect: Hans Linstow
- Architectural type: Long church
- Completed: 1836 (190 years ago)

Specifications
- Capacity: 110
- Materials: Wood

Administration
- Diocese: Bjørgvin bispedømme
- Deanery: Sogn prosti
- Parish: Nes
- Norwegian Cultural Heritage Site
- Type: Church
- Status: Automatically protected
- ID: 85115

Nes Church (Norwegian: Nes kyrkje) is a parish church of the Church of Norway in Luster Municipality in Vestland county, Norway. It is located in the village of Nes, on the western shore of the Lustrafjorden. It is the church for the Nes parish which is part of the Sogn prosti (deanery) in the Diocese of Bjørgvin. The white, wooden church was built in a long church design in 1836 using plans drawn up by the architect Hans Ditlev Franciscus Linstow. The church seats about 110 people.

== History ==
The earliest existing historical records of the church date back to the year 1322, but that was not the year of construction. The first church on this site was a wooden stave church, likely built in the early 1300s. In 1686, the building was described as having a 15-by-6-metre (49 ft × 20 ft) nave. In 1722, the 400-year-old building was described as having a pointed tower in the center of the roof and the interior was well-maintained in every way. In 1835, the ancient church was torn down. The following year, a new church was completed just south of the site of the old church building. Some of the materials from the old stave church were reused in the new church. The new building was consecrated in 1836 by the local Dean Wilhelm Christian Magelsen. The new church was described as being rather plain, similar to a square box with unpainted plank walls inside (others thought it was quite ugly). In 1909, the church was extensively rebuilt according to drawings by Schak Bull. This included a new church porch and sacristy were added improve the look of the church on the outside, plus there were several minor changes and paint on the inside to make the church more attractive. In the 1950s, the church received electric lighting and heating.

== Media gallery ==
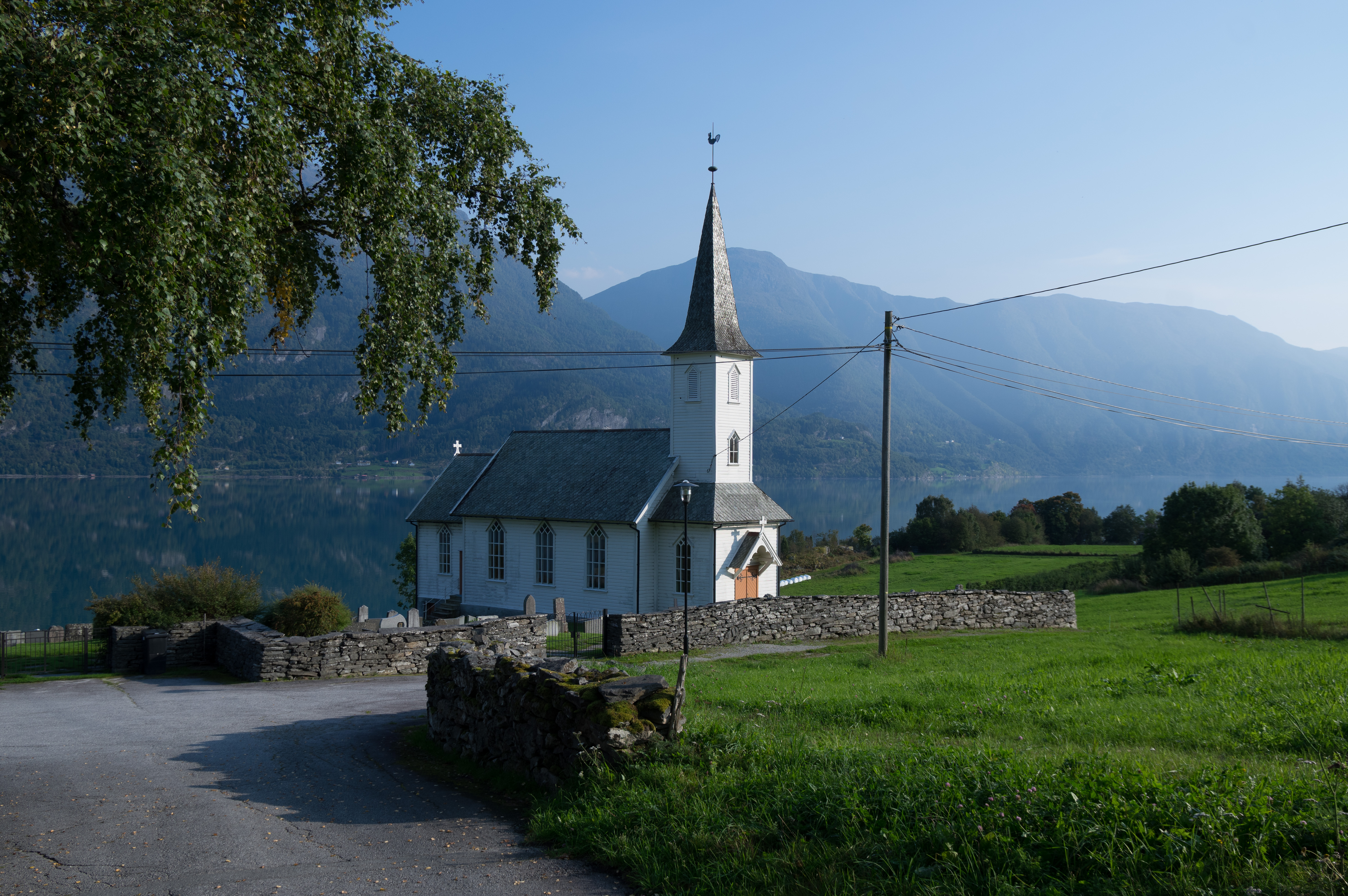

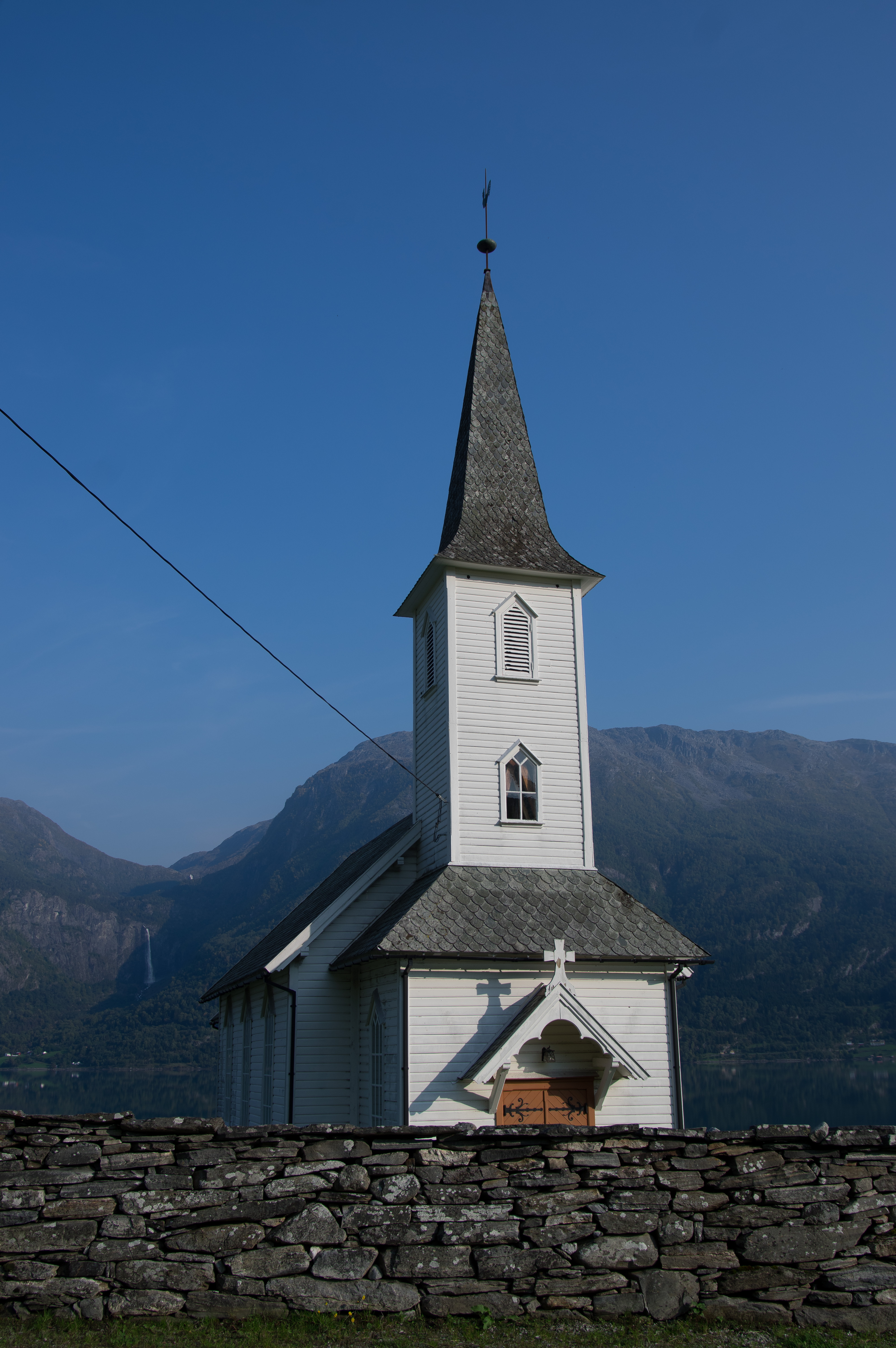

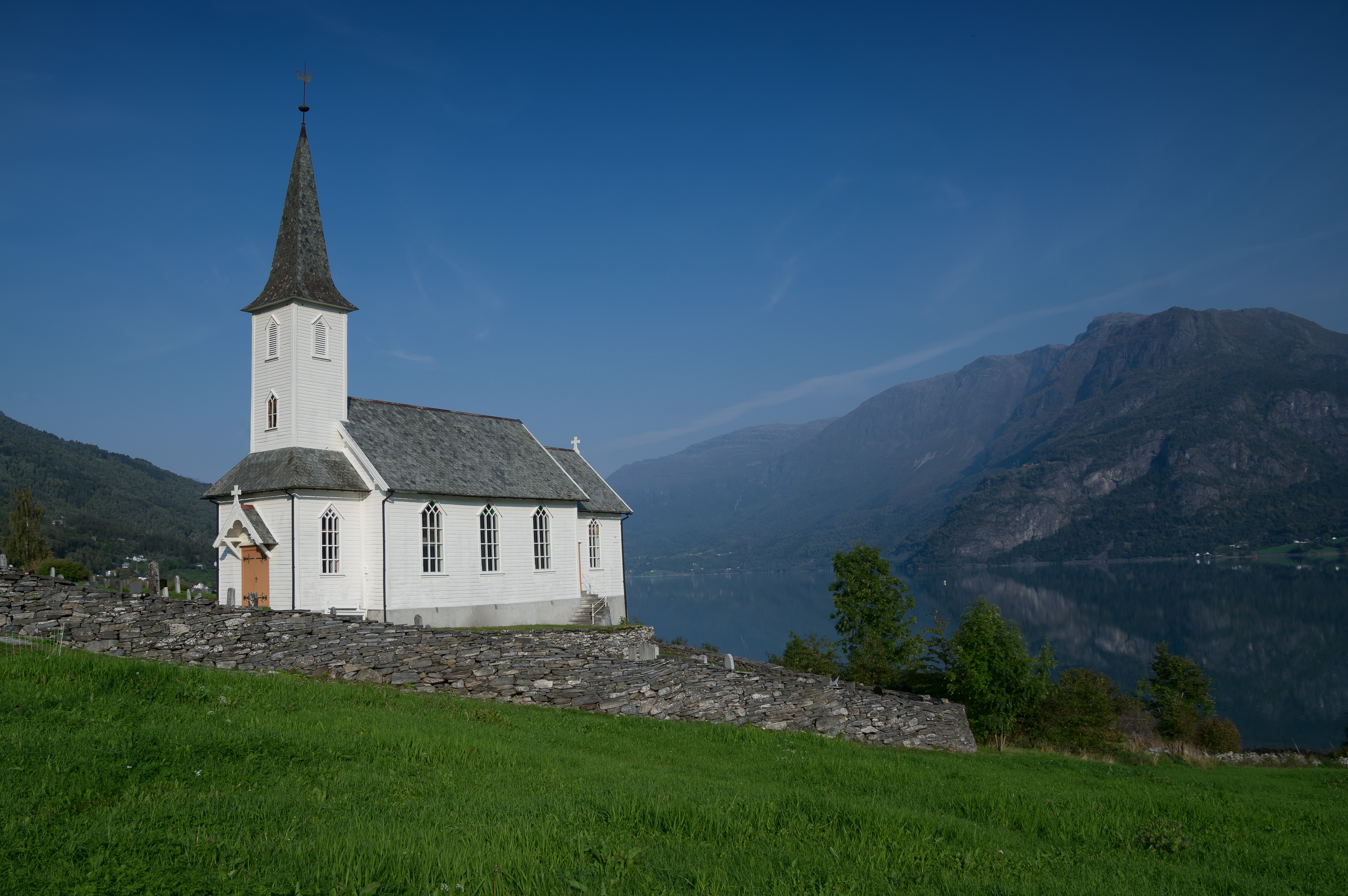

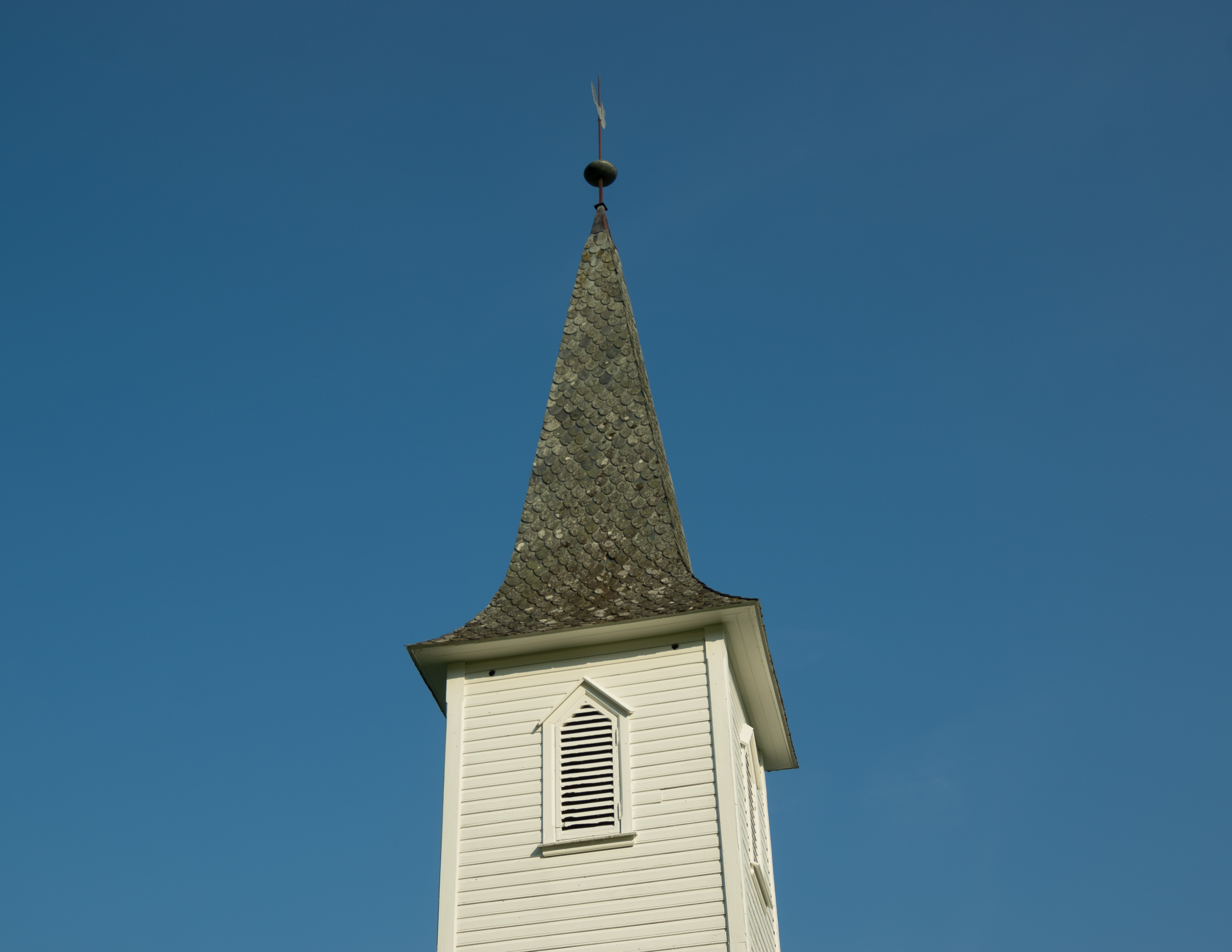

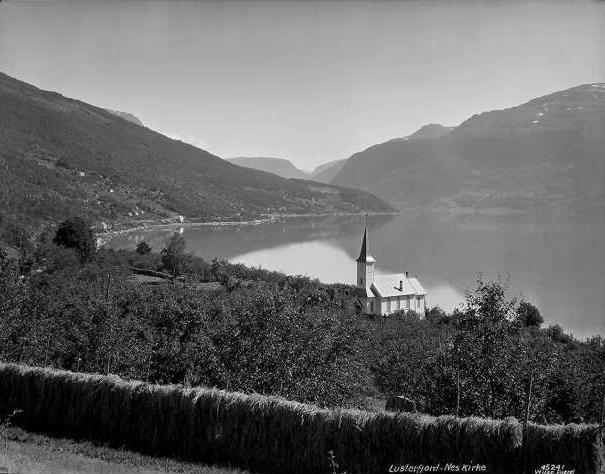

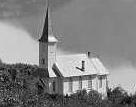

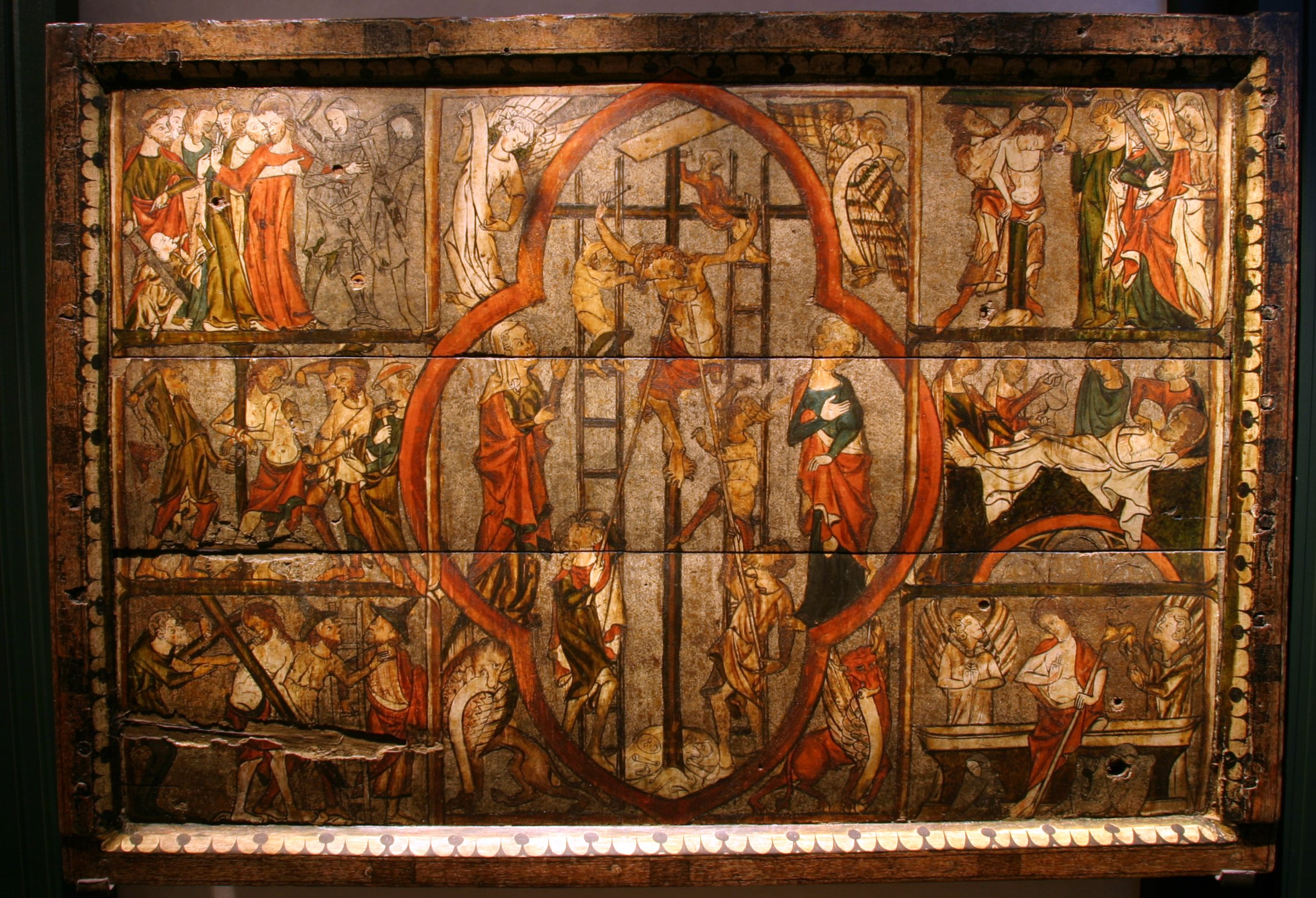
Altarpiece from 14th century church

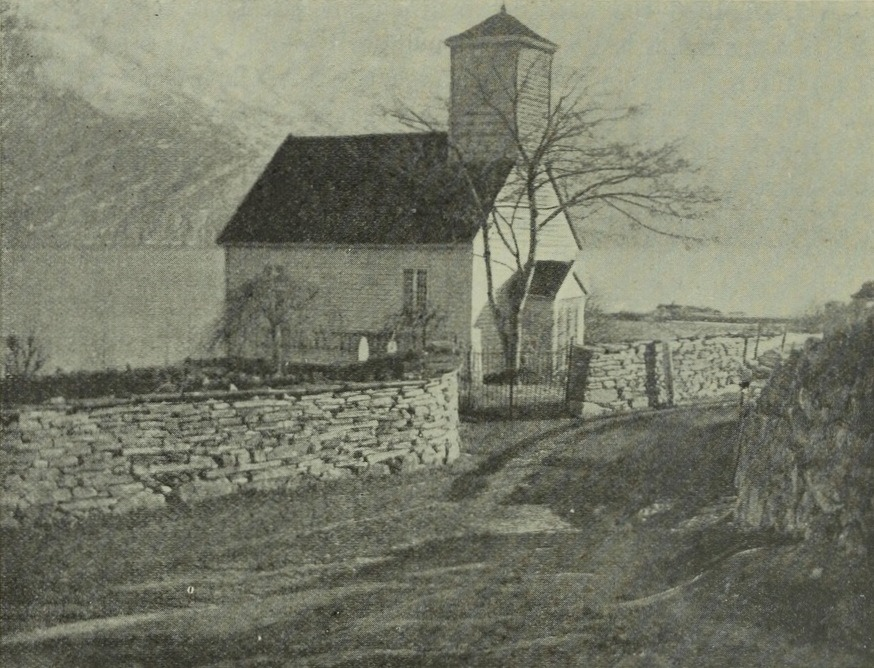
Before the 1909 renovations

== See also ==
- List of churches in Bjørgvin
