= Ramicourt =

- Commune
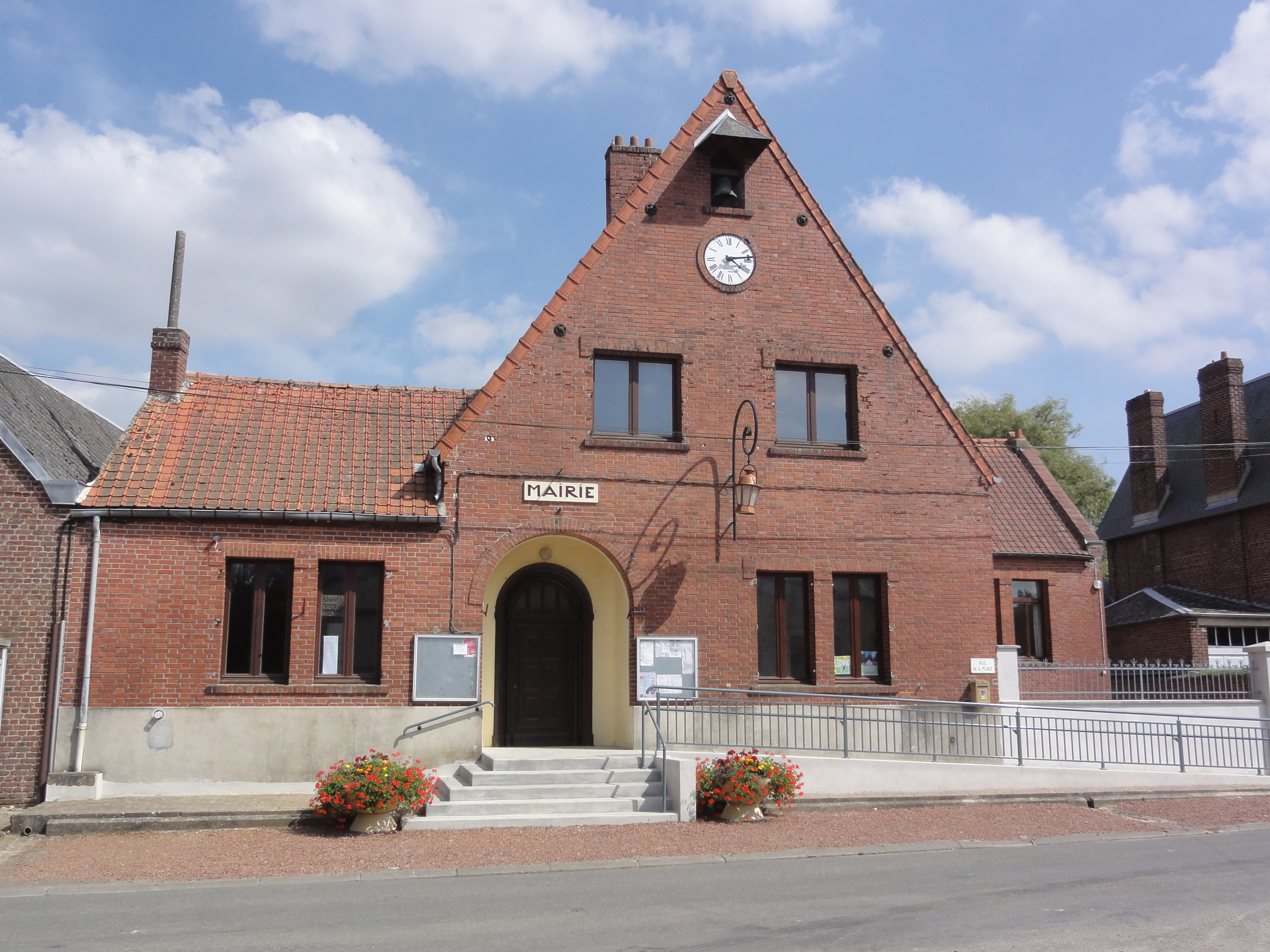
- The town hall of Ramicourt
- Location of Ramicourt
- Location within France Location within Hauts-de-France
- Coordinates: 49°57′35″N 3°19′50″E
- Country: France
- Region: Hauts-de-France
- Department: Aisne
- Arrondissement: Saint-Quentin
- Canton: Bohain-en-Vermandois
- Intercommunality: Pays du Vermandois

Government
  - Mayor (2026–32): Jean-Luc Milhem
- Area^{1}: 3.82 km^{2} (1.47 sq mi)
- Elevation: 67 m (220 ft)
- Highest elevation: 155 m (509 ft)
- Lowest elevation: 116 m (381 ft)
- Population (2023): 146
  - Density: 38.2/km^{2} (99.0/sq mi)
- Time zone: UTC+01:00 (CET)
  - Summer (DST): UTC+02:00 (CEST)
- INSEE/Postal code: 02635 /02110
- ^{1} French Land Register data, which excludes lakes, ponds, glaciers > 1 km^{2} (0.386 sq mi or 247 acres) and river estuaries.

Ramicourt (French pronunciation: [ʁamikuʁ]) is a commune in the Aisne department in Hauts-de-France in northern France.

== Population ==
Historical population
Year	Pop.	±% p.a.
1968	205	—
1975	176	−2.16%
1982	184	+0.64%
1990	169	−1.06%
1999	178	+0.58%
2007	173	−0.36%
2012	169	−0.47%
2017	150	−2.36%
2023	146	−0.45%
Source: INSEE

== See also ==
- Communes of the Aisne department
