= Van (disambiguation) =

A van is a road vehicle.

Van, VAN and other capitalizations may refer to:

== People and fictional characters ==
- van (Dutch), a common prefix in Dutch language surnames
- Van (given name), including a list of people and fictional characters with the given name or nickname
- Van (surname), including a list of people

== Places ==
=== Canada ===
- Vancouver, largest city in British Columbia

=== Iran ===
- Van, Iran a village

=== Turkey ===
- Lake Van, a lake in eastern Turkey
- Kingdom of Van, an Iron Age civilization centered on Lake Van (860–590 BC)
- Van, Turkey, a city on the east shore of Lake Van
- Van Province, a modern Turkish province
  - Van (electoral district), the electoral district of the province
  - Eyalet of Van, the province during the Ottoman Empire (1548–1864)
  - Van Vilayet, the province during the later Ottoman period (1875–1922)

=== United Kingdom ===
- Van, Caerphilly, a suburb east of Caerphilly, Wales
- Van, Llanidloes, a hamlet in Wales

=== United States ===
- Van, Arkansas, an unincorporated community
- Van, Missouri, an unincorporated community
- Van, Oregon, an unincorporated community
- Van, Texas, a city
- Van, Virginia, an unincorporated community
- Van, West Virginia, a census-designated place

=== Vanuatu ===
- Vanuatu's IOC and FIFA country code

== Organizations ==
- VAN Magazine, classical music magazine
- Vereniging Automatenhandel Nederland (VAN), the Dutch branch of EUROMAT
- NGP VAN, a voter database and web hosting service provider
- Van's Aircraft, founded by Richard Van Grunsen
- FC Van, an Armenian football club based in Charentsavan
- FC Van Yerevan, a defunct Armenian football club from the capital Yerevan, founded in 1990

== Transportation ==
- van, British English for a railway covered goods wagon
- Van Railway, former railway between Van and Caersws, Wales
- VAN, the IATA code for Van Ferit Melen Airport, Turkey

=== Vehicles ===
- Mitsubishi Van, a cargo van marketed in the United States
- Toyota Van, a light commercial and passenger van marketed in the United States
- Nissan Van, a light commercial and passenger van marketed in the United States
- Chevrolet Van, a range of full-sized vans marketed by General Motors
- Dodge Ram Van, a range of full-sized vans marketed by the Chrysler Corporation
- Arrival Van, a battery electric cargo van designed by Arrival

== Other uses ==
- van, the ISO 639 code for the Valman language of Papua New Guinea
- Vannic language, extinct language of the kingdom of Urartu
- Value-added network (VAN), a service intermediary between businesses for sharing data
- Vehicle Area Network, an intra-vehicle computer bus
- Van, Vanguard (military tactics)
- Van (band), Swedish musical group
- Van cat, a cat from the Lake Van region
- VAN method, a controversial method of earthquake prediction
- Van, 2020 album by Clown Core

== See also ==
- Vans (disambiguation)
- The Van (disambiguation)
- Vann (disambiguation)
- Vanne (disambiguation)
