= Ness Foundation =

Scottish research charity

The Ness Foundation was a research charity based near Inverness, Scotland. It was active from 1999 and was a constituent partner of the University of the Highlands and Islands (UHI) until the foundation became insolvent and by 2008 and parts were then acquired by UHI.

== History ==
The Highland Psychiatric Research Group had been founded in the 1980s with the involvement of Iain Glen, a consultant psychiatrist. Glen had an interest in cell membrane biochemistry, and theorised that there was a relationship to a group of mental health disorders.

The Ness Foundation was registered as a charity in 1998 and the following year became an associate partner of the project that went on to become the UHI Millenium Institute. Between 2001 and 2004 the Foundation was run by Dr. Brian M. Ross during which time the Foundation received support from the European Regional Development Fund and various other private and public partners. The ties between the University and the Ness Foundation grew closer with the Foundation contributing significantly to the total research output and income of UHI. It was involved with carrying out research into diagnosing conditions such as schizophrenia, bipolar disorder, autism spectrum disorder, developmental coordination disorder, dyslexia, depression and attention-deficit/hyperactivity disorder. Its principal area of research was the relevance of lipids in these disorders but later this has been extended to include the role of genetics.

Through its wholly owned commercial subsidiary, Pan Diagnostics Limited, the foundation worked to develop a tool kit intended to enable early detection of people at a higher risk of serious mental illness. The kit consisting of a skin patch, breath test (measuring how a person's body breaks down Omega-3 fatty acid) and if these were positive a genetic test was also run.

The foundation was a constituent partner of UHI when it became insolvent and by 2008 parts had been absorbed into UHI.
