= Thor Lillehovde =

Norwegian politician (born 1948)

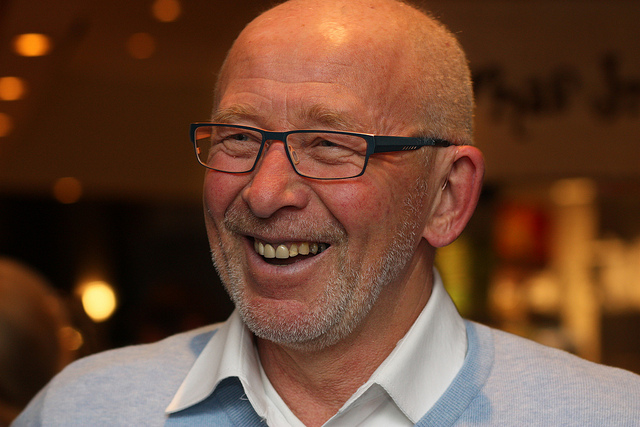
Lillehovde in 2012

Thor Lillehovde (born 3 April 1948) is a Norwegian politician for the Labour Party.

== Biography ==
He was born on 3 April 1948, in Ringsaker Municipality, to forest labourer Sigmund Lillehovde (1920–1989) and housewife Gerd Elvsveen (1921–present). His education ended with vocational school in 1966, and he was subsequently hired by Standard telefon og kabelfabrikk. From 1969 to 1991, he worked in the company Hymas which produced excavators.

Lillehovde became a board member of Brumunddal Labour Party in 1977, serving six years. He later served on the board of Hedmark Labour Party from 1986 to 1990. He was elected as a deputy member of the municipal council of Ringsaker Municipality in 1979, and then as a regular member in 1983. In 1987, he was re-elected and became deputy mayor, and then served as mayor from 1991 to 2007. He has served as a deputy representative to the Parliament of Norway from Hedmark during the terms 1997–2001, 2009–2013 and 2013–2017.

Lillehovde has chaired Nybygda IL from 1986 to 1988 and been a board member of Brumunddal IL since 2007. He has chaired Mesna Kraftselskap from 1996 to 2002 and been a board member of Hamarregionen Energiverk (1996–2002), Hamar og Omegn Boligbyggelag (2000–2004), Eidsiva Energi (2002–2007) and Coop Innlandet (2007–).
