= Kylstad =

Village in Ringsaker Municipality, Norway

Kylstad Kylstadfeltet
- Village
- Interactive map of Kylstad
- Location within Innlandet Location within Norway
- Coordinates: 60.86987°N 11.03991°E
- Country: Norway
- Region: Eastern Norway
- County: Innlandet
- District: Hedmarken
- Municipality: Ringsaker Municipality

Area
  - Total: 0.28 km^{2} (0.11 sq mi)
- Elevation: 259 m (850 ft)

Population (2024)
  - Total: 397
  - Density: 1,418/km^{2} (3,670/sq mi)
- Time zone: UTC+01:00 (CET)
  - Summer (DST): UTC+02:00 (CEST)
- Post Code: 2320 Furnes

Kylstad or Kylstadfeltet is a village in Ringsaker Municipality in Innlandet county, Norway. The village is located about 6 kilometres (4 mi) east of the town of Brumunddal and about 3 kilometres (1.9 mi) north of the village of Nydal.

The 0.28-square-kilometre (69-acre) town has a population (2024) of 397 and a population density of 1,418 inhabitants per square kilometre (3,670/sq mi).
