= Dag Ivar Hovde =

Norwegian biathlete

Personal information
- Full name: Dag Ivar Hovde
- Born: February 1973 (age 53) Brumunddal, Hedmark, Norway

Sport

Professional information
- Sport: Biathlon
- Club: Brumund IF
- World Cup debut: 6 March 1993

World Cup
- Seasons: 1 (1992/93)
- All races: 3
- All podiums: 0
Medal record
Men's biathlon
Representing Norway
Norwegian Championships
Gold medal – first place	1994 Orkdal	Team event
Bronze medal – third place	1996 Brumunddal	Team event
Junior World Championships
Gold medal – first place	1993 Ruhpolding	Team event
Silver medal – second place	1992 Canmore	15 km individual
Bronze medal – third place	1992 Canmore	Team event
Junior Norwegian Championships
Gold medal – first place	1992 Meldal	15 km individual
Gold medal – first place	1992 Meldal	10 km sprint
Silver medal – second place	1992 Meldal	4 × 7.5 km relay

Dag Ivar Hovde (born February 1973) is a former Norwegian biathlete.

== Life and career ==
Hovde was born in the settlement of Brumunddal in Ringsaker Municipality in the eastern part of Norway in February 1973.

Hovde debuted at the Junior World Championships in 1992 in Canmore. The first event was the team event, which was a partial success, as the Norwegian team composed of Stig Kalstad, Ole Einar Bjørndalen and Hovde won bronze. He subsequently became the best Norwegian in the 10 km sprint, finishing 12th. Two days later, Hovde won a silver medal in the 15 km individual, finishing behind only Franck Perrot. The final distance, the relay, turned out less successful. Hovde finished 6th, having raced alongside Stig Kalstad, Frode Andresen, and Ole Einar Bjørndalen, and having taken the anchor leg. The quartet was never in medal contention, as Kalstad received two penalty loops in the standing shoot, and Andresen thus left the first exchange three minutes behind the leaders. The following year, in Ruhpolding, Hovde won gold in the team event, racing alongside Andresen and Bjørndalen. Though Andresen earned four penalty loops for the team in the prone shoot, both Hovde and Bjørndalen shot cleanly in their shoots, and that, combined with fast skiing from them all, secured Norway the gold ahead of France and Germany. Hovde then faltered slightly in the individual events, finishing 4th in both the 15 km individual and the 10 km sprint. Hovde finished in eighth place in the relay, having once again taken the anchor leg, racing with Egil Gjelland, Andresen and Bjørndalen.

In the World Cup, Hovde debuted in the fourth round of the 1992–93 World Cup in Lillehammer, Norway. He finished 98th in the sprint and only returned to the World Cup for two more races that season. Hovde did not catch on later, and he only had three starts in the World Cup, the best of which was a 40th in Kontiolahti in 1992–93. As he did not score any World Cup points, he did not have any overall placement in the total score of the World Cup.

At home, Hovde was also successful. He won two medals at the Norwegian Biathlon Championships, one of which was gold. Hovde won three medals at the Junior Norwegian Biathlon Championships, of which two were gold.

== Biathlon results ==
=== Junior World Championships ===
3 medals (1 gold, 1 silver, 1 bronze)

Event	Individual	Sprint	Team	Relay
(Canada) 1992 Canmore	Silver	12th	Bronze	6th
(Germany) 1993 Ruhpolding	4th	4th	Gold	8th
