= Mesnali Church =

Church in Innlandet, Norway

- Mesnali kirke
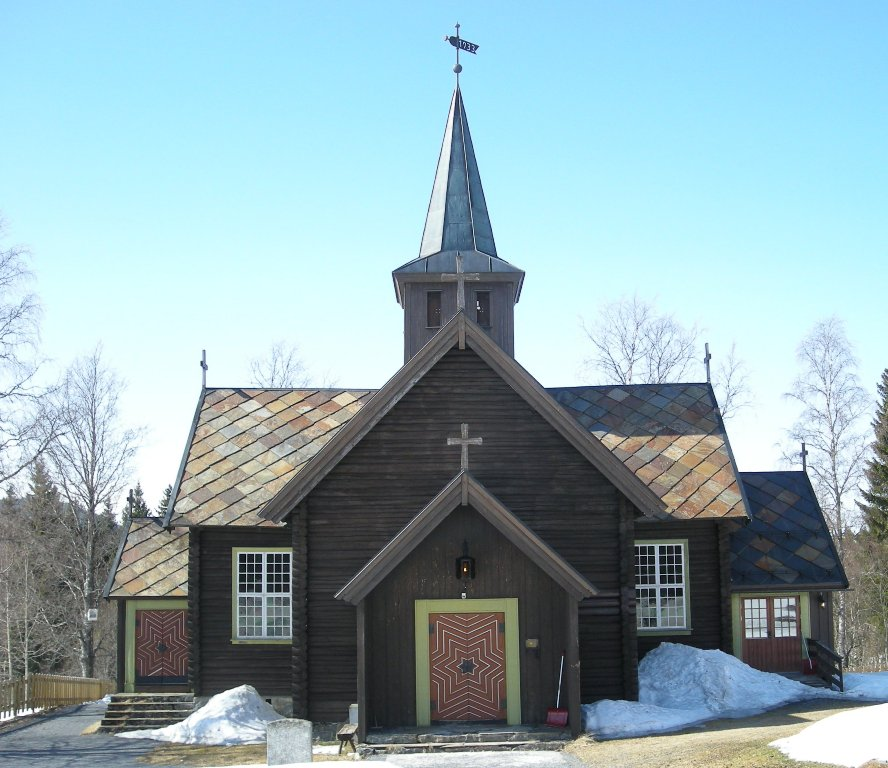
- View of the church
- Mesnali Church
- 61°06′09″N 10°41′33″E
- Location: Ringsaker Municipality, Innlandet
- Country: Norway
- Denomination: Church of Norway
- Churchmanship: Evangelical Lutheran

History
- Status: Parish church
- Founded: 1933
- Consecrated: 19 September 1933

Architecture
- Functional status: Active
- Architect: Ingeborg Krafft
- Architectural type: Cruciform
- Completed: 1933 (93 years ago)

Specifications
- Capacity: 170
- Materials: Wood

Administration
- Diocese: Hamar bispedømme
- Deanery: Ringsaker prosti
- Parish: Brøttum
- Norwegian Cultural Heritage Site
- Type: Church
- Status: Protected
- ID: 84941

Mesnali Church (Norwegian: Mesnali kirke) is a parish church of the Church of Norway in Ringsaker Municipality in Innlandet county, Norway. It is located in the village of Mesnali. It is one of the churches for the Brøttum parish which is part of the Ringsaker prosti (deanery) in the Diocese of Hamar. The brown, wooden church was built in a cruciform design in 1933 using plans drawn up by the architect Ingeborg Krafft. The church seats about 170 people.

== History ==
The people of the Mesnali area had long wished for their own chapel due to the long and difficult road to their parish church, Brøttum Church. A plot of land at Havrehaugen was donated to the parish by Oline and Even Sagstuen for the purpose of building an annex chapel in the Brøttum Church parish. Initially, a bell tower was erected in 1927 and a cemetery on the site was consecrated on 11 December 1928. Soon afterwards, Ingeborg Krafft was hired to design the new chapel that would be built at the cemetery site. The building was designed as a half-timbered cruciform chapel in a style reminiscent of the many cruciform churches in the Gudbrandsdalen valley. The foundation wall of the new chapel was built in 1932 and the rest of the building was completed the following year. The new building was consecrated on 19 September 1933. In 1978, the chapel was upgraded to full parish church status.

== Media gallery ==
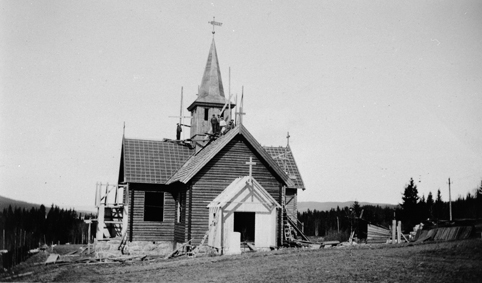
Photo of the construction of the new church

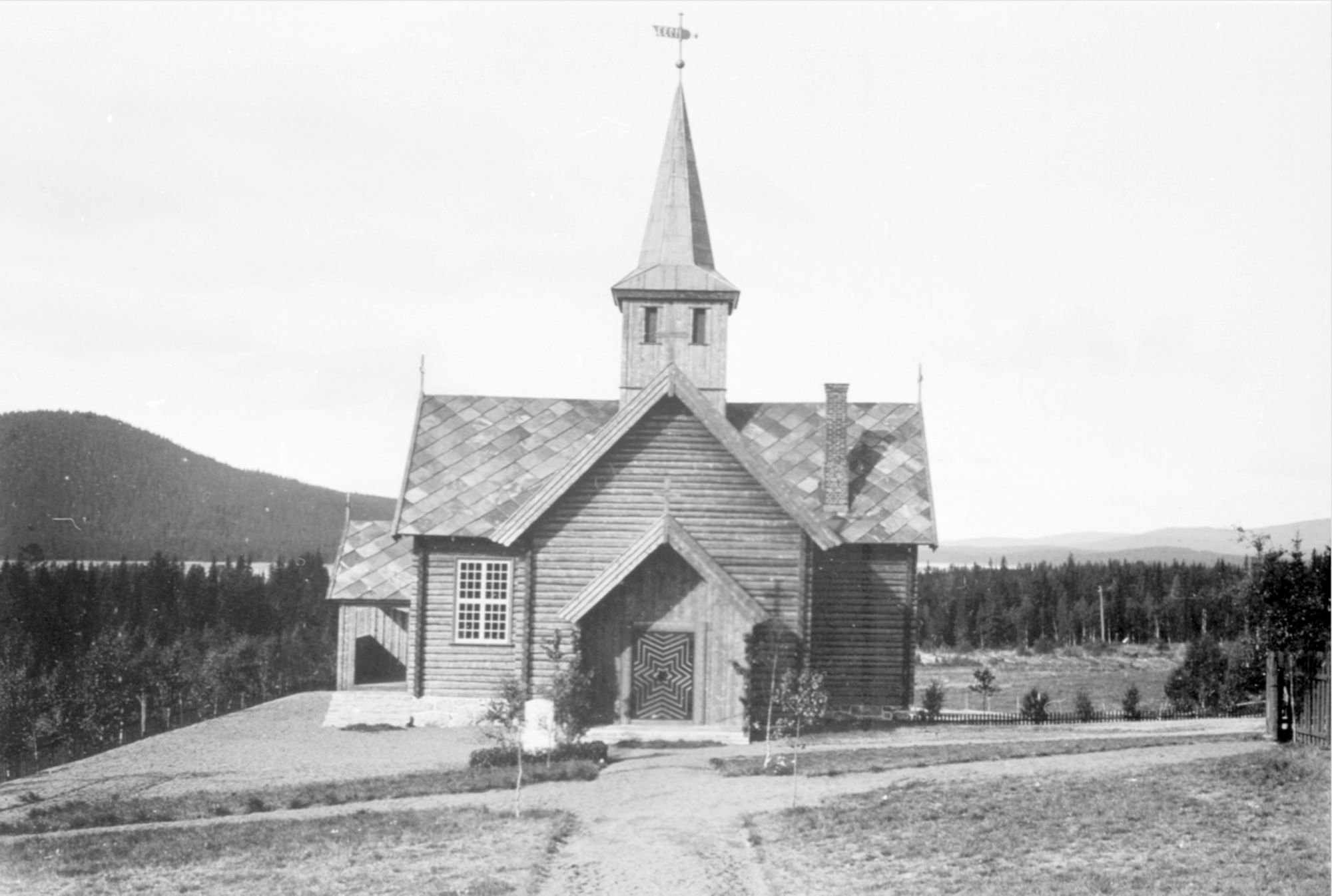

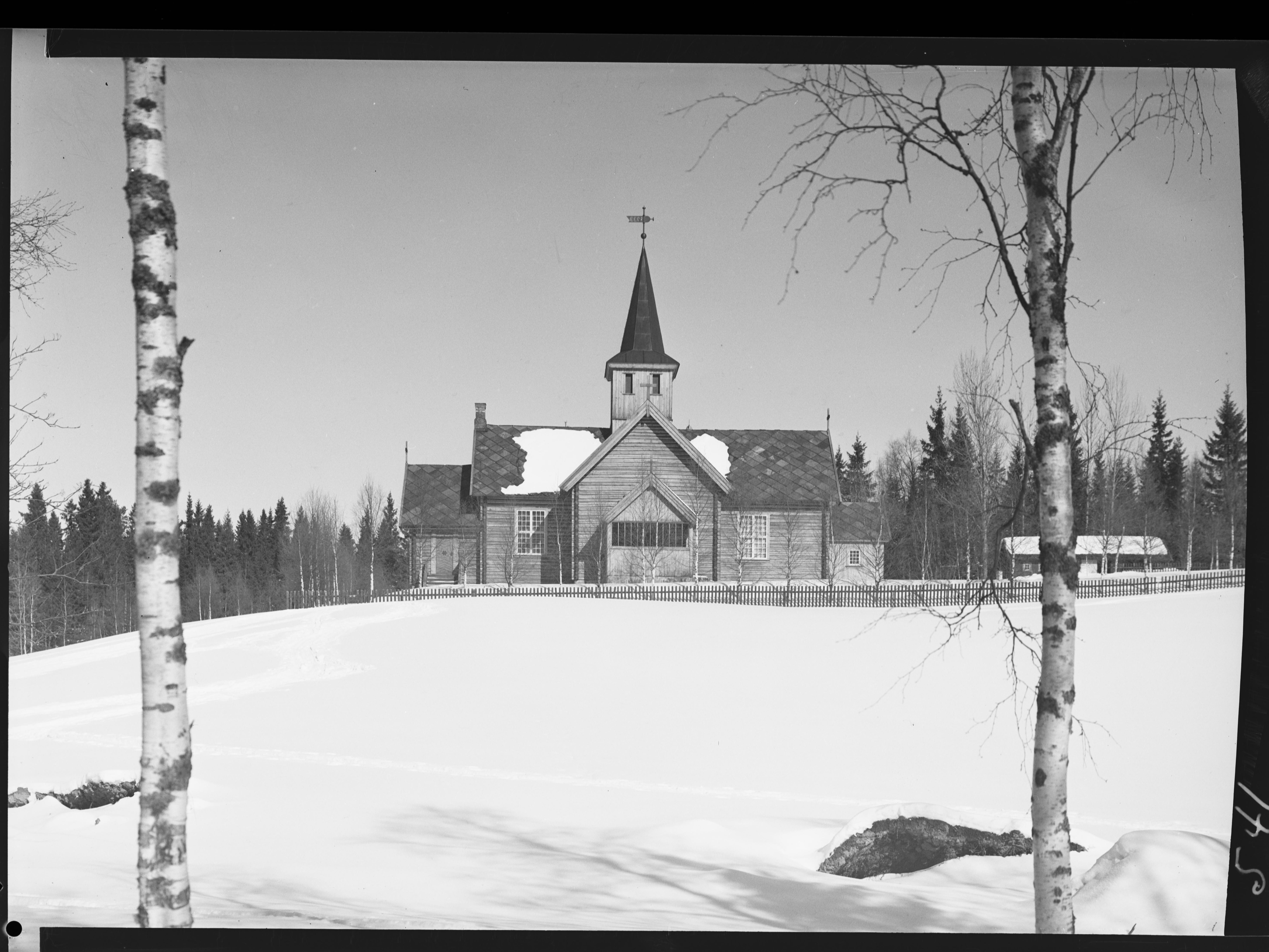

== See also ==
- List of churches in Hamar
