= Byflaten =

Village in Ringsaker Municipality, Norway

Byflaten Veldre
- Village
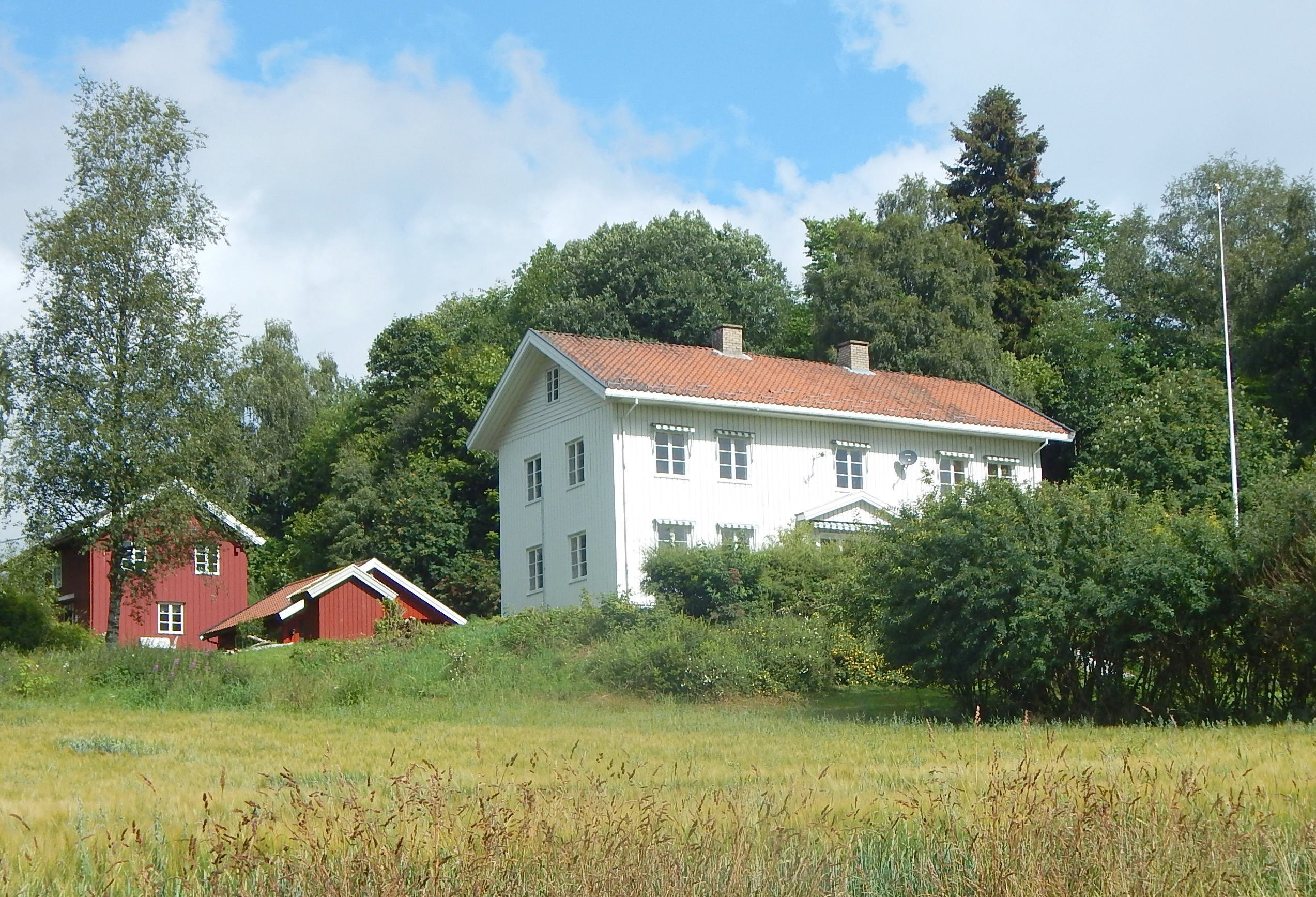
- View of a farm in Byflaten
- Interactive map of Byflaten
- Location within Innlandet Location within Norway
- Coordinates: 60.91975°N 10.90546°E
- Country: Norway
- Region: Eastern Norway
- County: Innlandet
- District: Hedmarken
- Municipality: Ringsaker Municipality

Area
  - Total: 0.2 km^{2} (0.077 sq mi)
- Elevation: 291 m (955 ft)

Population (2024)
  - Total: 254
  - Density: 1,270/km^{2} (3,300/sq mi)
- Time zone: UTC+01:00 (CET)
  - Summer (DST): UTC+02:00 (CEST)
- Post Code: 2385 Brumunddal

Byflaten or Veldre is a village in Ringsaker Municipality in Innlandet county, Norway. The village is located about 4 kilometres (2.5 mi) northwest of the town of Brumunddal. Veldre Church is located on the west side of the village.

The 0.2-square-kilometre (49-acre) village has a population (2024) of 254 and a population density of 1,270 inhabitants per square kilometre (3,300/sq mi).

The area surrounding the village is known as Veldre. The area is highly productive farmland and pine forests. The higher points in Veldre offer a splendid view over the Hedmarken district and southern parts of the lake Mjøsa.

== Notable people ==
- Johan Nordhagen (1856–1956, born in Veldre), a well-known graphic artist whose graphic prints are mostly motives from Veldre
- Guttorm P. Haugen, a poet and writer who described the wilderness of the large forests and the value of natural living as opposed to life in the city
- One can debate whether Alf Prøysen came from Veldre, or the neighboring Rudshøgda, but his ties to the district were deeply rooted. His motives grew out of his working-class peasant childhood. His folk tunes are some of the most important contributions to the national heritage.
