= Brumunda =

River in Innlandet, Norway

Brumunda Brumundelva
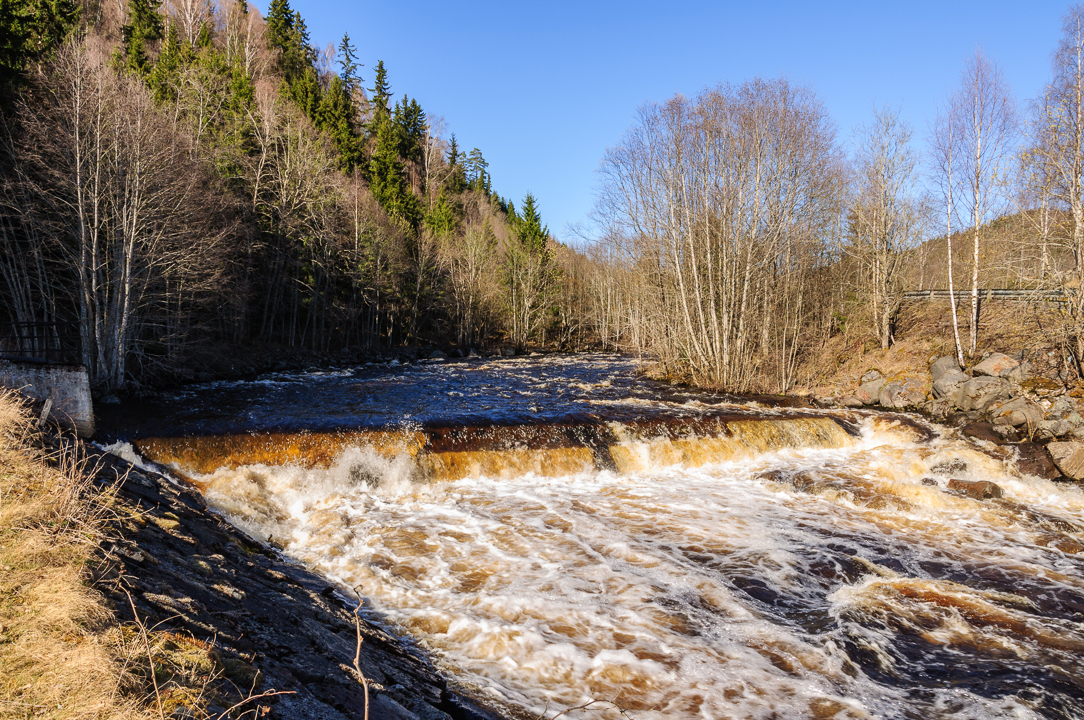
- View of the river Brumunda north of Brumunddal

Location
- Country: Norway
- County: Innlandet
- Municipalities: Ringsaker Municipality

Physical characteristics
- Source: Brumundsjøen lake
  - location: Ringsaker, Norway
  - coordinates: 61.026557°N 11.10168°E
  - elevation: 633 metres (2,077 ft)
- Mouth: Mjøsa lake
  - location: Brumunddal, Norway
  - coordinates: 60.87620°N 10.930935°E
  - elevation: 121 metres (397 ft)
- Length: 32.2 km (20.0 mi)
- Basin size: 223.23 km^{2} (86.19 sq mi)
- Discharge
  - average: 3.35 m^{3}/s (118 cu ft/s)

Brumunda is a river in Innlandet county, Norway. The 32.2-kilometre (20.0 mi) long river begins at the lake Brumundsjøen on the border of Ringsaker Municipality and Hamar Municipality. The river begins at the lake, just north of Høljemyra and continues in a southerly direction to the south of Bersbuseter. The river ends at the town of Brumunddal where it flows into the lake Mjøsa, a few kilometres north of the town of Hamar.

The river Brumunda serves as the border between the Church of Norway parishes of Furnes and Veldre. During the Middle Ages, the river was the border between southern and northern Hedemarken. It still serves as the border between the southern and northern variants of the Hedmarksk dialect. North of the river people use ei and øy, while on the south side they say e and ø.

== See also ==
- List of rivers in Norway
