= Rudshøgda =

Village in Ringsaker Municipality, Norway

- Village
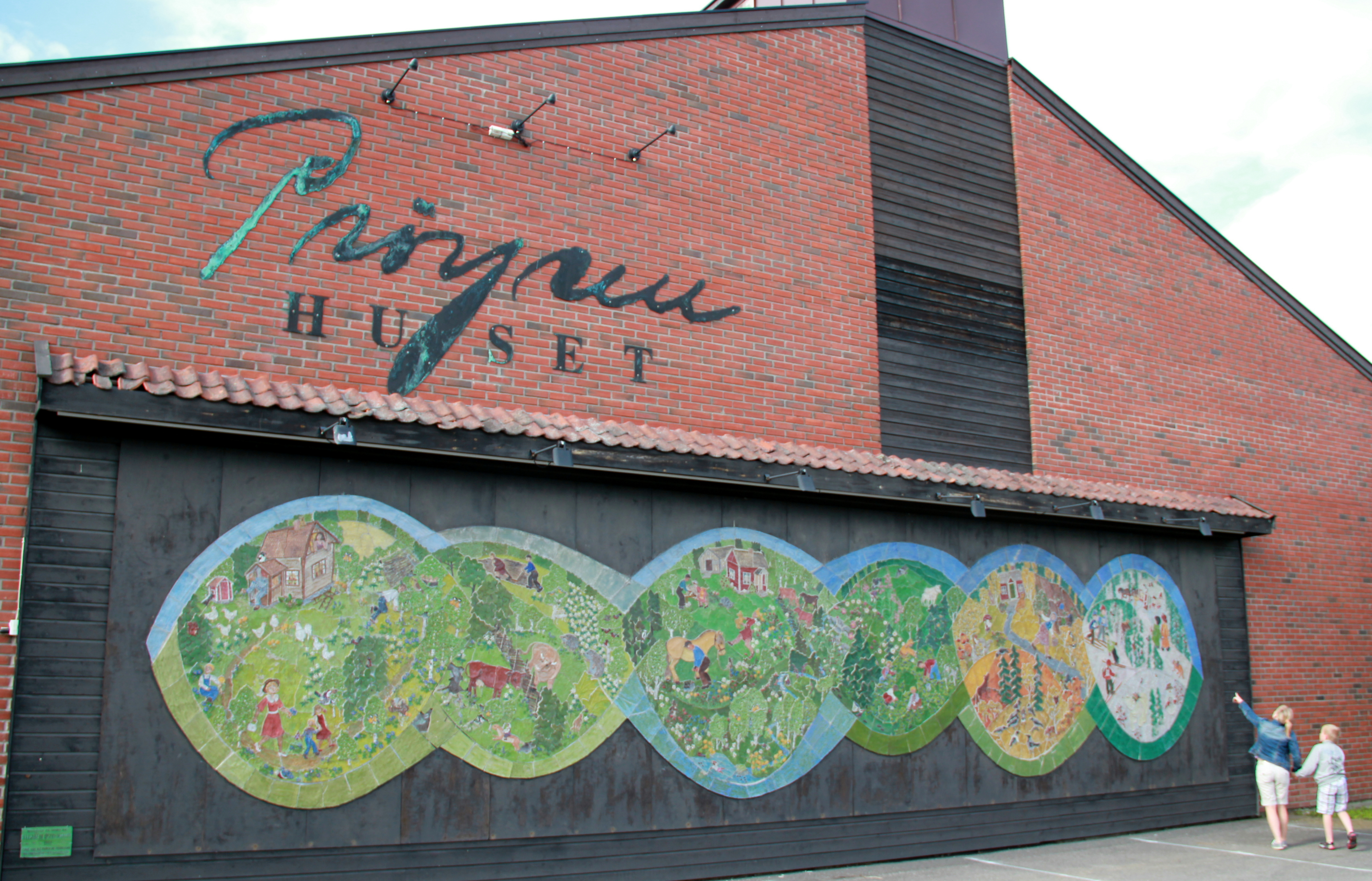
- View of the Prøysenhuset at Rudshøgda
- Interactive map of Rudshøgda
- Location within Innlandet Location within Norway
- Coordinates: 60.91568°N 10.81588°E
- Country: Norway
- Region: Eastern Norway
- County: Innlandet
- District: Hedmarken
- Municipality: Ringsaker Municipality
- Elevation: 255 m (837 ft)
- Time zone: UTC+01:00 (CET)
  - Summer (DST): UTC+02:00 (CEST)
- Post Code: 2360 Rudshøgda

Rudshøgda is a village in Ringsaker Municipality in Innlandet county, Norway. The village is located about 7 kilometres (4.3 mi) from the towns of Moelv (to the northwest) and Brumunddal (to the southeast). The European route E6 highway runs through the village.

The Dovrebanen railway line runs through the village as well. From 1914 to 1994, the trains stopped at the Rudshøgda Station. During the 1980s there were plans to build an airport at Rudshøgda, but this did not happen.

== Prøysenhuset ==
Rudshøgda was the childhood home of author, poet, playwright, songwriter and musician, Alf Prøysen. Prøysenhuset is a cultural center and museum honoring his memory. The main part of the museum is a permanent exhibition that tells the story of the career of the author of the Mrs. Pepperpot series of children books. The center also has an auditorium, gift shop, café and play ground. The center was designed by the architectural and engineering firm Snøhetta. It was opened on 23 July 2014 and is now a department under the Cultural Office of the municipality of Ringsaker.
