= Nydal =

Village in Ringsaker Municipality, Norway

- Village
- Interactive map of Nydal
- Location within Innlandet Location within Norway
- Coordinates: 60.84571°N 11.04314°E
- Country: Norway
- Region: Eastern Norway
- County: Innlandet
- District: Hedmarken
- Municipality: Ringsaker Municipality

Area
  - Total: 0.84 km^{2} (0.32 sq mi)
- Elevation: 185 m (607 ft)

Population (2012)
  - Total: 849
  - Density: 1,011/km^{2} (2,620/sq mi)
- Time zone: UTC+01:00 (CET)
  - Summer (DST): UTC+02:00 (CEST)
- Post Code: 2320 Furnes

Nydal is a village in Ringsaker Municipality in Innlandet county, Norway. The village is located along the European route E6 highway about 5 kilometres (3.1 mi) northwest of the town of Hamar and about 7 kilometres (4.3 mi) southeast of the town of Brumunddal. The village of Furnes lies about 1 kilometre (0.62 mi) to the southwest and the village of Kvalfeltet lies about 2 kilometres (1.2 mi) to the northwest.

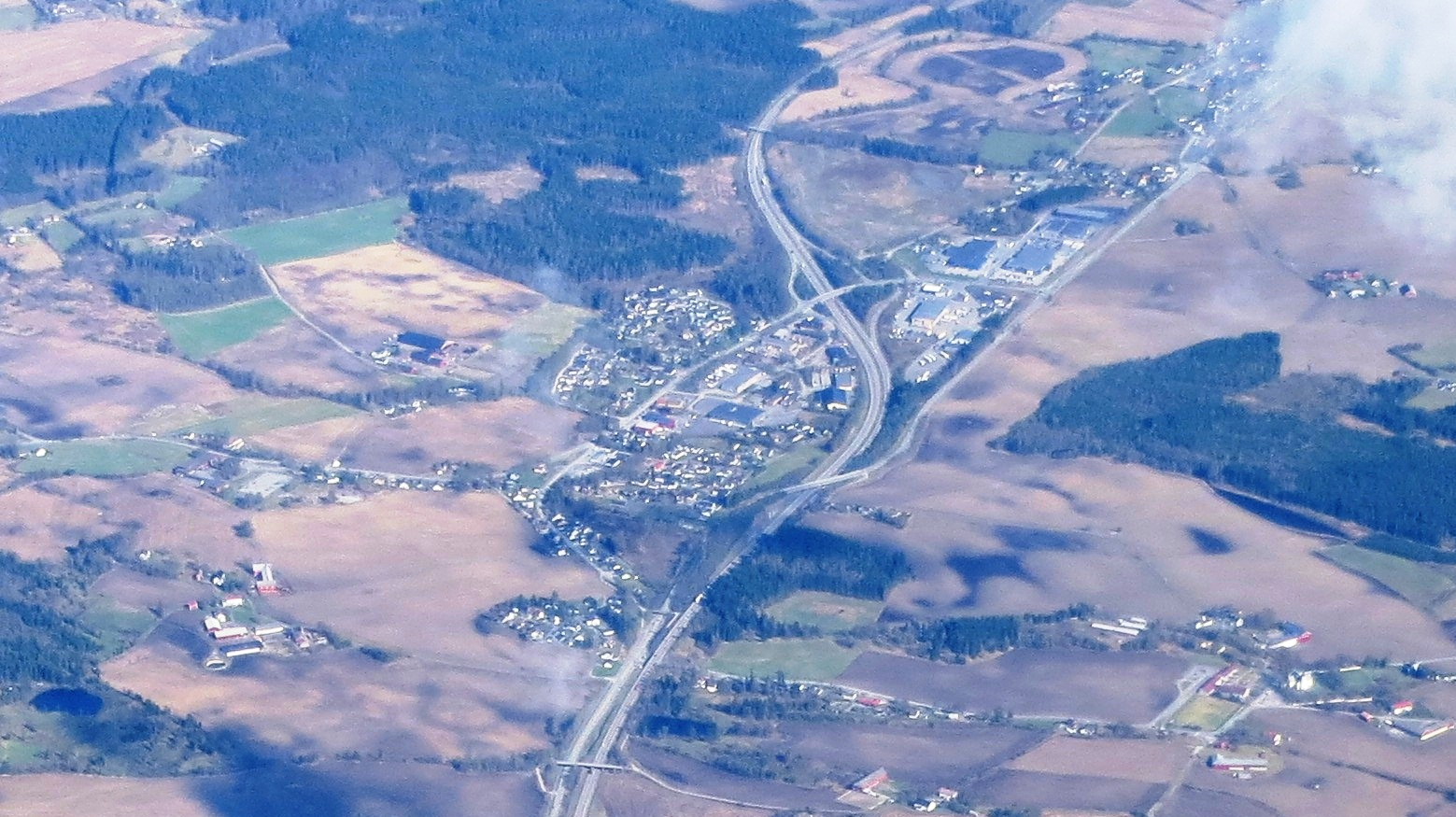
Aerial view of Nydal in 2013

The 0.84-square-kilometre (210-acre) village had a population (2012) of 849 and a population density of 1,011 inhabitants per square kilometre (2,620/sq mi). Since 2012, it has been included as a part of the urban area of the town of Hamar so the population and area data for this village area has not been separately tracked by Statistics Norway.
