= Brumunddal Church =

Church in Innlandet, Norway

- Brumunddal kirke
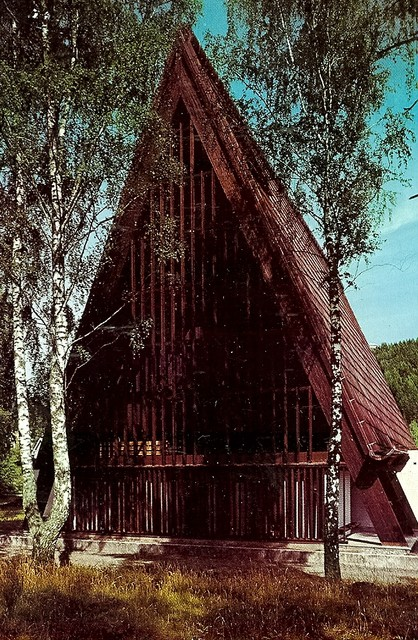
- View of the church
- Brumunddal Church
- 60°53′05″N 10°57′10″E
- Location: Ringsaker Municipality, Innlandet
- Country: Norway
- Denomination: Church of Norway
- Churchmanship: Evangelical Lutheran

History
- Status: Parish church
- Founded: 1965
- Consecrated: 28 November 1965

Architecture
- Functional status: Active
- Architect(s): Molle Cappelen, Per Cappelen, and Svein Erik Lundby
- Architectural type: Long church
- Completed: 1965 (61 years ago)

Specifications
- Capacity: 350
- Materials: Wood and brick

Administration
- Diocese: Hamar bispedømme
- Deanery: Ringsaker prosti
- Parish: Brumunddal/Veldre
- Norwegian Cultural Heritage Site
- Type: Church
- Status: Not protected
- ID: 83959

Brumunddal Church (Norwegian: Brumunddal kirke) is a parish church of the Church of Norway in Ringsaker Municipality in Innlandet county, Norway. It is located in the village of Brumunddal. It is one of the two churches for the Brumunddal/Veldre parish which is part of the Ringsaker prosti (deanery) in the Diocese of Hamar. The brown wood and white brick church was built in a long church design in 1965 using plans drawn up by the architects Molle Cappelen, Per Cappelen, and Svein Erik Lundby. The church seats about 350 people.

== History ==
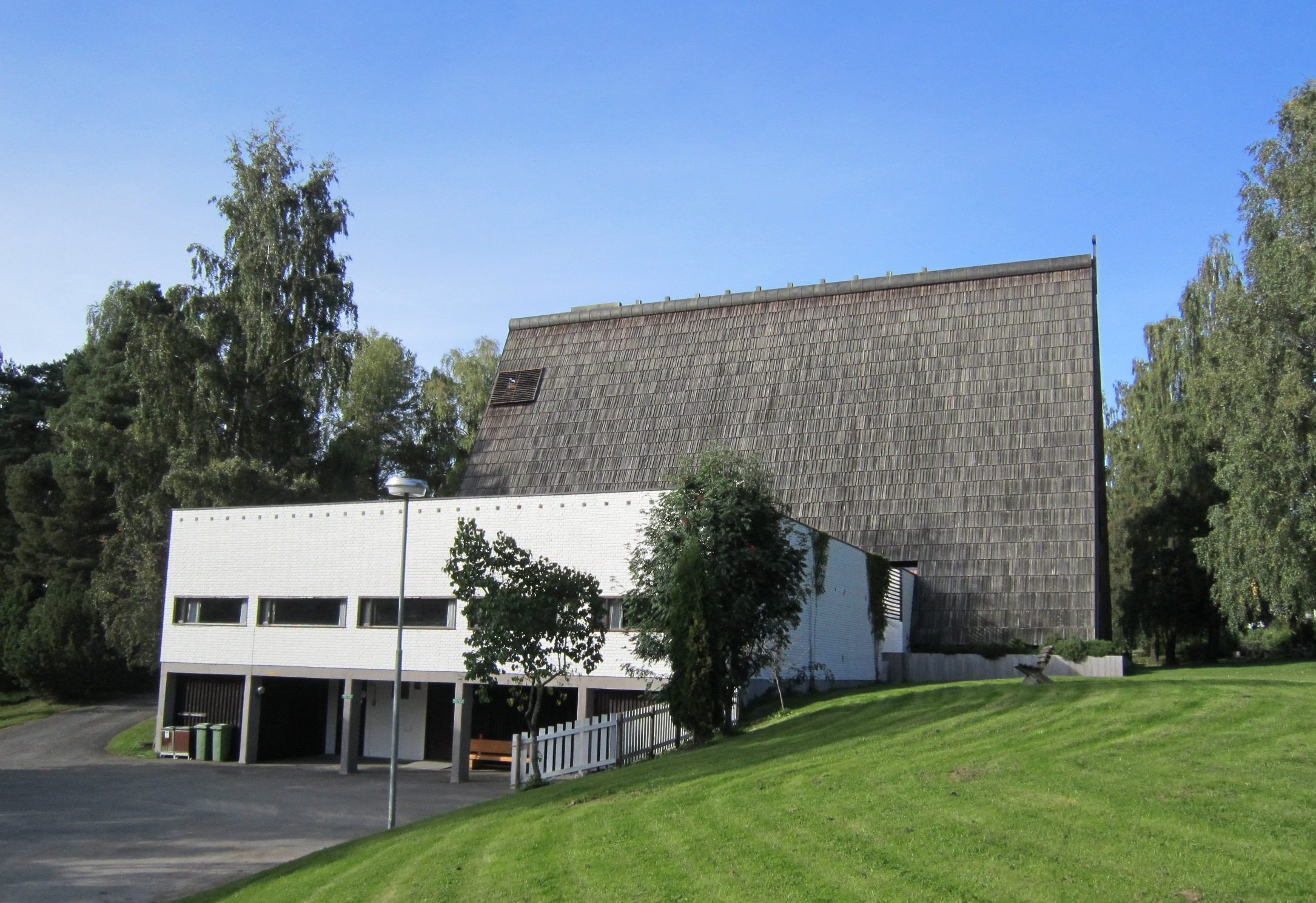
Side view of the church in 2011.

The parish made plans for a new church in Brumunddal during the 1960s. Molle Cappelen, Per Cappelen, and Svein Erik Lundby were hired to design the new church. The large nave has seating for about 350 people. On one side of the nave there is a church hall and on the other side is an extension with a priest's office, sacristy, and baptismal waiting room.

== See also ==
- List of churches in Hamar
