= Brumunddal IL =

Norwegian sports club

Former club crest

Brumunddal Idrettslag is a Norwegian alliance sports club from Brumunddal, Hedmark. It has departments for association football and alpine skiing.

== General history ==
The skiing club SK Fram was founded on 17 December 1895. Their prime skier, Johannes Grini won the King's Cup in the Holmenkollen ski festival of 1906. He also chaired the club from 1904 to 1906. The club Fram went through a series of mergers before the modern Brumunddal IL was formed.

Brumunddal FK was founded in 1905. The club changed its name to Frem IL in 1919 as the sport athletics was added. In 1921 the club bought a sports field which from 1924 was named Frambanen. This happened after SK Fram and Frem IL merged in 1924 to form Fram IL. The sports were thus football, athletics and Nordic skiing. Tennis was added in 1933, cycling in 1934 and speed skating in 1935.

Brumunddal AIL was founded as an AIF club on 18 April 1932. Its first sports were boxing and Nordic skiing. In the summer of 1933 cycling and race walking were added; soon after football, athletics, sport shooting, chess and team handball. The club bought the sports field Sveum together with Brumunddal Arbeiderlag in the autumn of 1934.

The club took the name Brumunddal IL after the merger of Fram IL and Brumunddal AIL on 11 November 1945. The club centred its field activities (such as football, athletics, speed skating) around Sveum, and sold Frambanen to the dairy Brumunddal Meieri. After the merger, the new Brumunddal IL had sections for football, Nordic skiing, speed skating, athletics, cycling, tennis, swimming, boxing and shooting. In 1947 the club took up orienteering.
