= Stig Kalstad =

Norwegian biathlete

Personal information
- Full name: Stig Kalstad
- Born: 1 November 1973 (age 52) Meldal Municipality, Sør-Trøndelag, Norway

Sport

Professional information
- Sport: Biathlon
- Club: Meldal IL
Medal record
Men's biathlon
Representing Norway
Norwegian Championships
Bronze medal – third place	1994 Trondheim	4 × 7.5 km relay
Junior World Championships
Bronze medal – third place	1992 Canmore	Team event
Junior Norwegian Championships
Bronze medal – third place	1992 Meldal	4 × 7.5 km relay

Stig Kalstad (born 1 November 1973) is a former Norwegian biathlete.

== Life and career ==
Kalstad was born in Meldal Municipality in the central part of Norway.

Kalstad debuted at the Junior World Championships in 1992 in Canmore. The first event was the team event, which was a partial success, as the Norwegian team composed of Kalstad, Ole Einar Bjørndalen and Dag Ivar Hovde won bronze. Kalstad subsequently came 19th in the 10 km sprint, missing twice and finishing one minute and forty seconds behind the winner, René König. Kalstad was not selected for the 15 km two days later. Kalstad was selected for the final distance, the relay, but that race turned out a disappointment. Kalstad finished 6th having raced alongside Frode Andresen, Ole Einar Bjørndalen and Dag Ivar Hovde, and having taken the first leg. Kalstad received two penalty loops in his standing shoot, putting his team out of medal contention, and sending off Andresen from the first exchange three minutes behind the leaders.

Though a talented junior, Kalstad did not perform well enough the following season to be selected for the 1993 Junior World Championships in Ruhpolding, nor did he develop further in his senior years. Thus, Kalstad was never selected for the World Cup team and never raced in the World Cup.

At home, though, Kalstad was not without success. He won one medal at the Norwegian Biathlon Championships, a bronze in the relay in 1994 in Trondheim. Additionally, Kalstad won a bronze in the relay at the Junior Norwegian Championships in 1992 in his hometown of Meldal.
