= Ingeborg Krafft =

Norwegian architect (1902 – 1963)

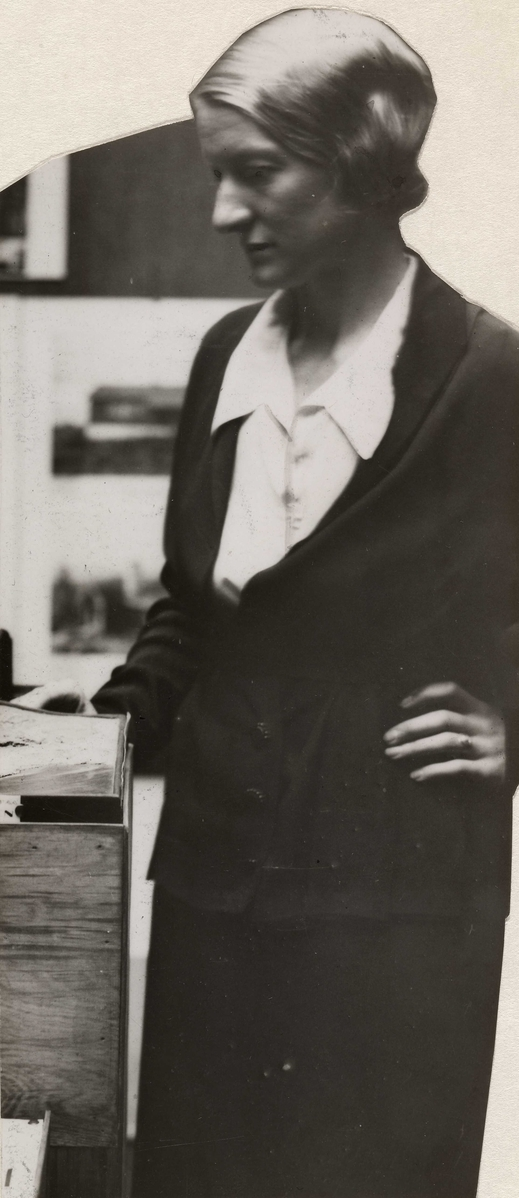
Ingeborg Krafft

Ingeborg Krafft (23 April 1902 – 20 May 1963) was a Norwegian architect who worked extensively on housing and interior design. She also designed the Mesnali Church.

== Biography ==
Born on 23 April 1902, Ingeborg Krafft was the daughter of Petter Pettersen and his wife Sophie Susanne Krafft. She attended the Norwegian National Academy of Craft and Art Industry. She went on to study at the KTH Royal Institute of Technology in Stockholm, Sweden, between 1926 and 1928.

She began her professional career, partly during her studies, as an assistant architect to a number of renowned architects in Norway and Sweden including Henrik Bull, Lars Backer, Israel Wahlman, Gunnar Asplund, and Hakon Ahlberg. From 1930, she began her own architectural practice in Oslo, and initially designed cabins, summer houses and villas. Later, her works focused more on housing and interior design.

Krafft became a permanent consultant for the Norway's Farmers' Women's Association. She was also associated with a number of other professional organizations including the National Association of Norwegian Architects, the Women's International Housing Committee, and the Norwegian Farmer Women's Rationalization Committee.

In 1947, she received the Lars Backer's grant to study the housing reforms in America.

She died on 20 May 1963.
