= Moelv =

Town in Innlandet, Norway

- Town/City
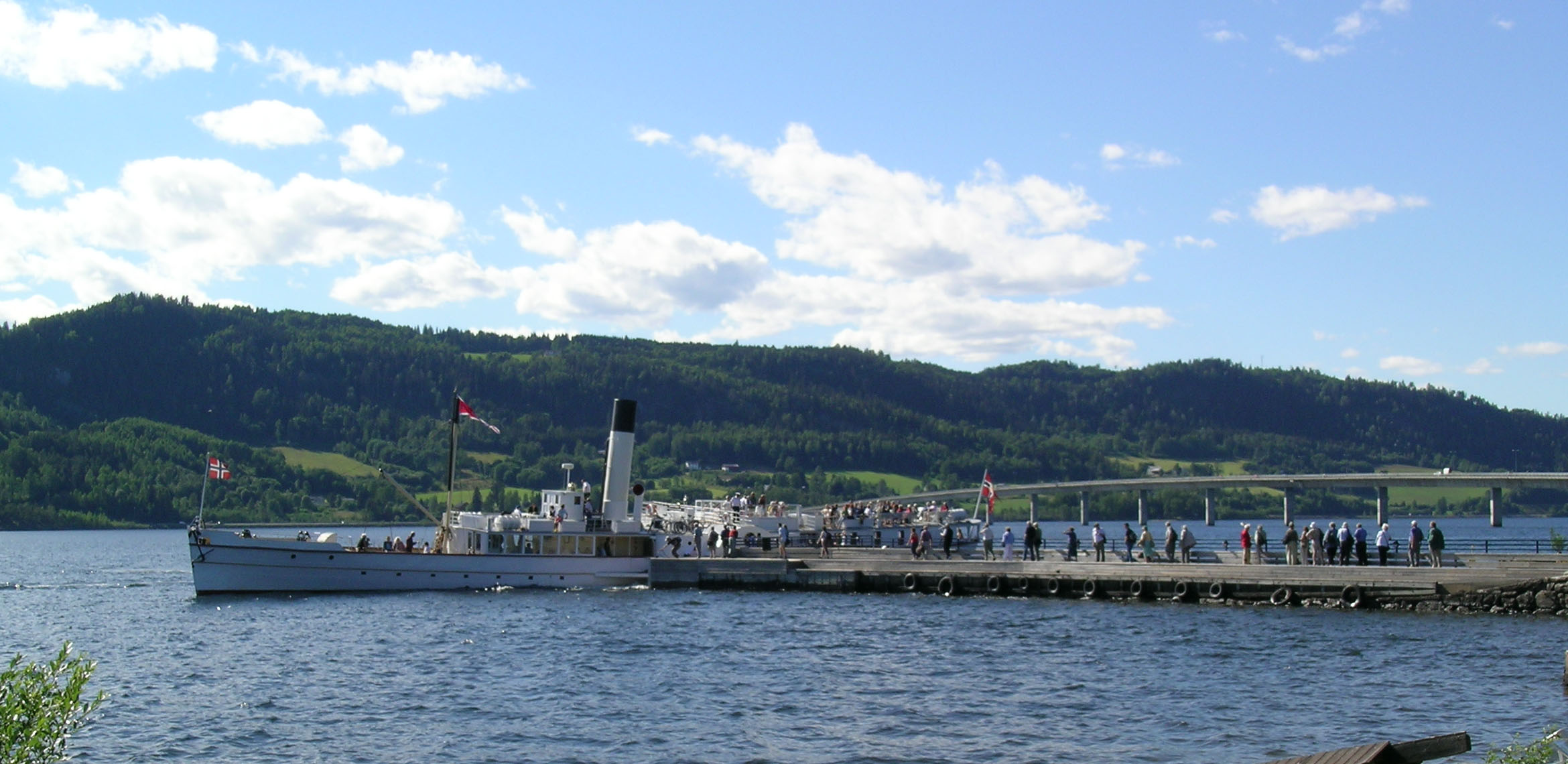
- View of the steam paddler Skibladner at Moelv pier
- Interactive map of Moelv
- Location within Innlandet Location within Norway
- Coordinates: 60.92827°N 10.70103°E
- Country: Norway
- Region: Eastern Norway
- County: Innlandet
- District: Hedmarken
- Municipality: Ringsaker Municipality
- Established as
- Town (By): 2010

Area
  - Total: 3.95 km^{2} (1.53 sq mi)
- Elevation: 140 m (460 ft)

Population (2024)
  - Total: 4,547
  - Density: 1,151/km^{2} (2,980/sq mi)
- Demonym: Modøl
- Time zone: UTC+01:00 (CET)
  - Summer (DST): UTC+02:00 (CEST)
- Post Code: 2390 Moelv

Moelv is a town in Ringsaker Municipality in Innlandet county, Norway. The town is located along the shores of Lake Mjøsa, about 30 kilometres (19 mi) south of the town of Lillehammer and about the same distance northwest of the town of Hamar. Moelv is the second largest urban area in Ringsaker Municipality (after Brumunddal).

The 3.95-square-kilometre (980-acre) town has a population (2024) of 4,547 and a population density of 1,151 inhabitants per square kilometre (2,980/sq mi).

Situated at the shores of Lake Mjøsa at the mouth of the Moelva river, the town is bordered by green, forested hills and farmland. The town consists of a few shopping centers, the Moelv Station along the Dovrebanen railway line, and some pubs and restaurants. The main employer is Moelven Industrier, a manufacturer of specialty building materials.

Archaeological excavations have found traces of human habitation in the area back to the Norwegian Stone Age. In 2010, the urban area of Moelv was granted town status.

The European route E6 used to run through Moelv, but in 1985, the Mjøsa Bridge opened for traffic, and since then, the main highway has gone around the town rather than going through it.

The local sports team is Moelven IL.

== See also ==
- List of towns and cities in Norway
