= Moelva (Ringsaker) =

River in Innlandet, Norway

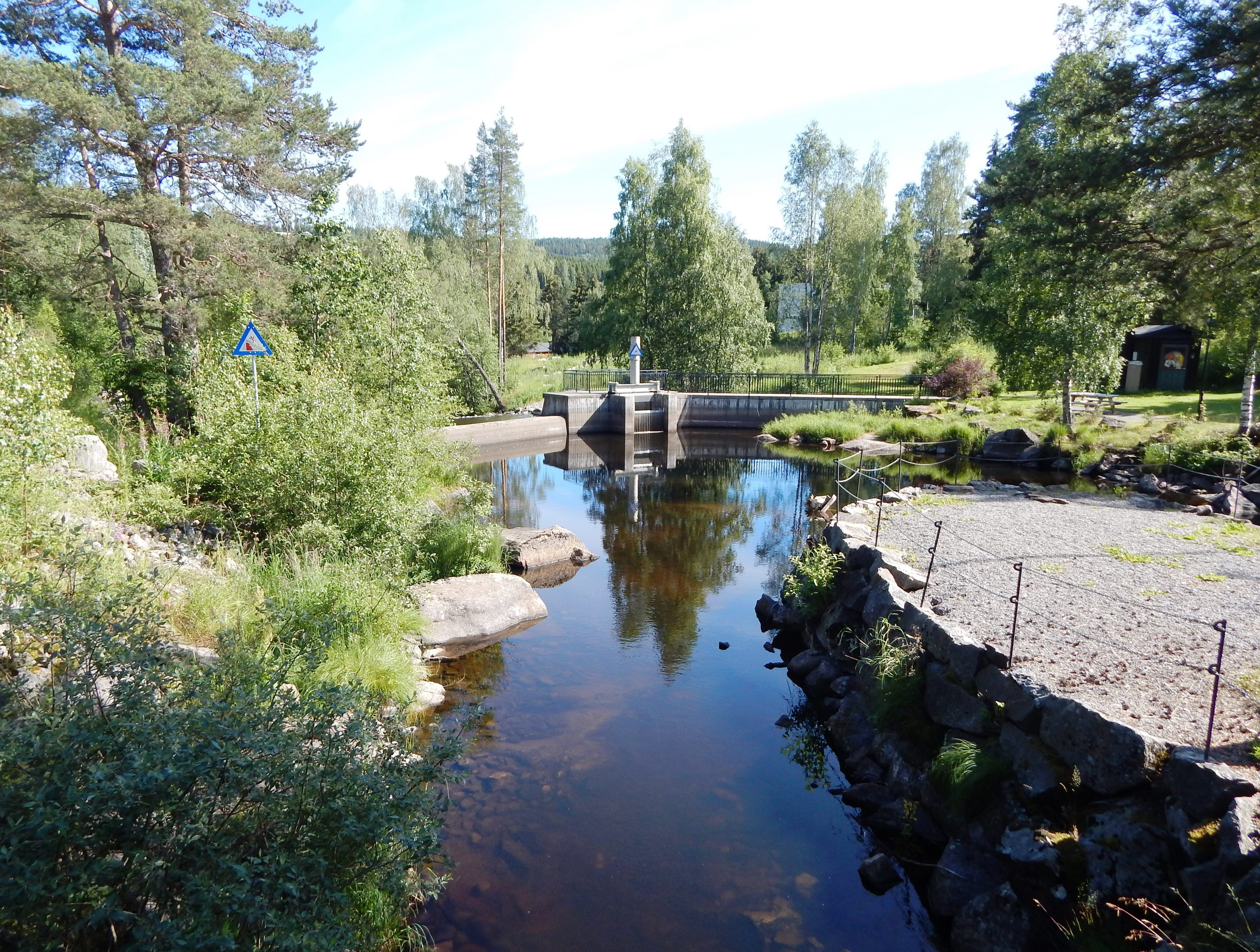
- This dam at Næroset marks the beginning of Moelva

Location
- Country: Norway
- County: Innlandet
- Municipalities: Ringsaker Municipality

Physical characteristics
- Source: Næra
  - location: Næroset, Norway
  - coordinates: 60.9749811°N 10.77561378°E
  - elevation: 340 metres (1,120 ft)
- Mouth: Mjøsa lake
  - location: Moelv, Norway
  - coordinates: 60.922538°N 10.69128513°E
  - elevation: 121 metres (397 ft)
- Length: 10 km (6.2 mi)
- Basin size: 191.4 km^{2} (73.9 sq mi)
- Width
  - average: 12–18 metres (39–59 ft)
- Discharge
  - location: Moelv
  - average: 2.61 m^{3}/s (92 cu ft/s)

Moelva is a river in Ringsaker Municipality in Innlandet county, Norway. The 10-kilometre (6.2 mi) long river begins as the discharge from lake Næra's southeast end, running southwesterly and joining lake Mjøsa at the town of Moelv (the town is named after the river). The Moelva is generally about 12–18 metres (39–59 ft) in width, providing sufficient flow to have industrial value for power generation.

== See also ==
- List of rivers in Norway
