= Mesnali =

Village in Ringsaker Municipality, Norway

Mesnali Alternative spellings: Mesnlia / Mesenlia / Mesnalia / Messenlia
- Village
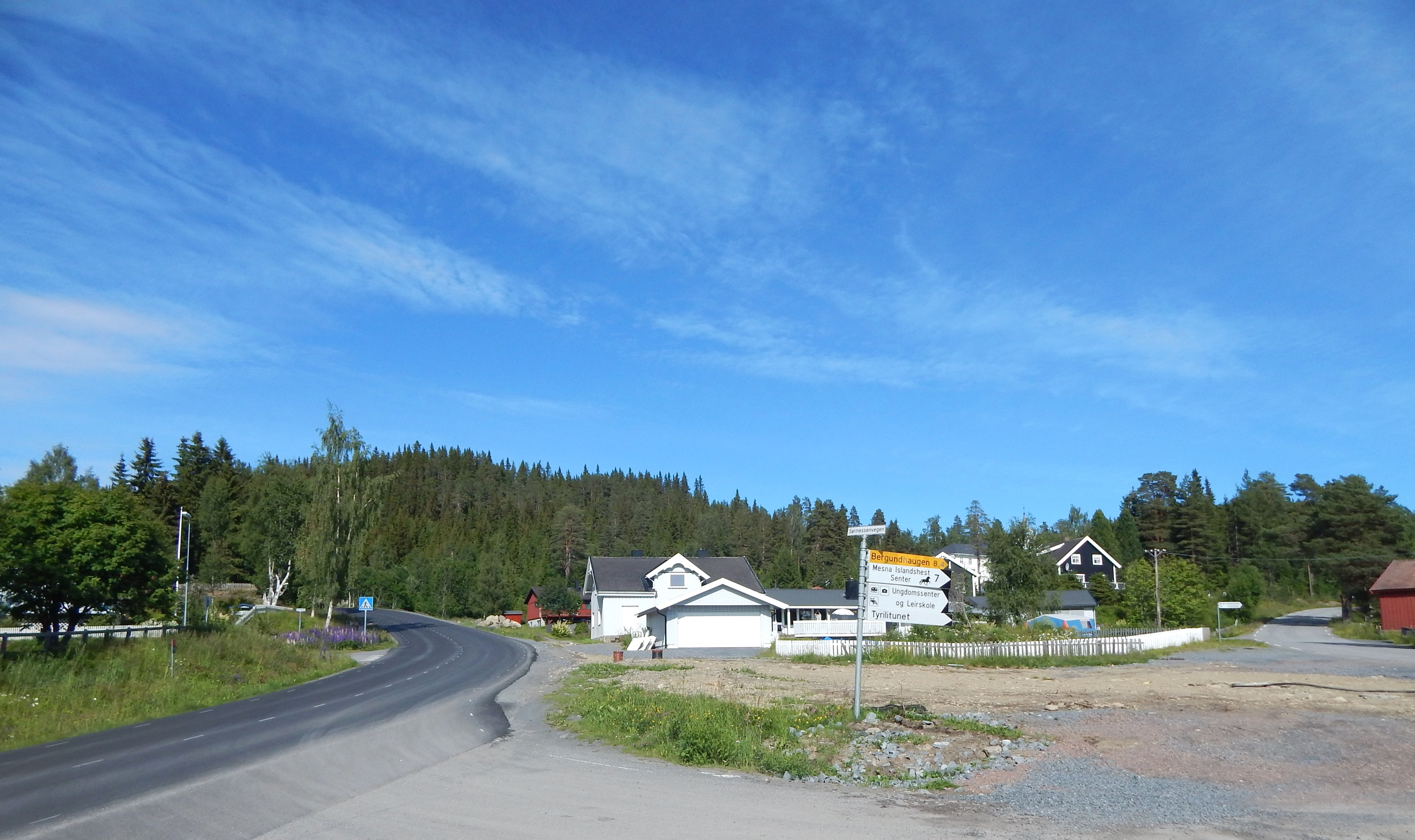
- View of the village
- Interactive map of Mesnali
- Location within Innlandet Location within Norway
- Coordinates: 61.10265°N 10.69889°E
- Country: Norway
- Region: Eastern Norway
- County: Innlandet
- District: Hedmarken
- Municipality: Ringsaker Municipality

Area
  - Total: 0.61 km^{2} (0.24 sq mi)
- Elevation: 550 m (1,800 ft)

Population (2024)
  - Total: 382
  - Density: 626/km^{2} (1,620/sq mi)
- Time zone: UTC+01:00 (CET)
  - Summer (DST): UTC+02:00 (CEST)
- Post Code: 2610 Mesnali

Mesnali is a village in Ringsaker Municipality in Innlandet county, Norway. The village is located about 15 kilometres (9.3 mi) southeast of the town of Lillehammer and about 8 kilometres (5.0 mi) southwest of Sjusjøen. Sjusjøen is an area in Norway that is very famous for its winter sports such as cross-country skiing and downhill skiing. The area just north of Mesnali has one of the largest concentrations of holiday cottages in all of Norway.

The 0.61-square-kilometre (150-acre) town has a population (2024) of 382 and a population density of 626 inhabitants per square kilometre (1,620/sq mi).

Mesnali is also known as the site of the grave of Sigrid Undset, a Norwegian author who was awarded the Nobel prize for literature. Her portrait was on the Norwegian 500-kroner note from 1994 until 2020.
