= Ringsaker Municipality =

Municipality in Innlandet, Norway

Ringsaker Municipality Ringsaker kommune
- Municipality
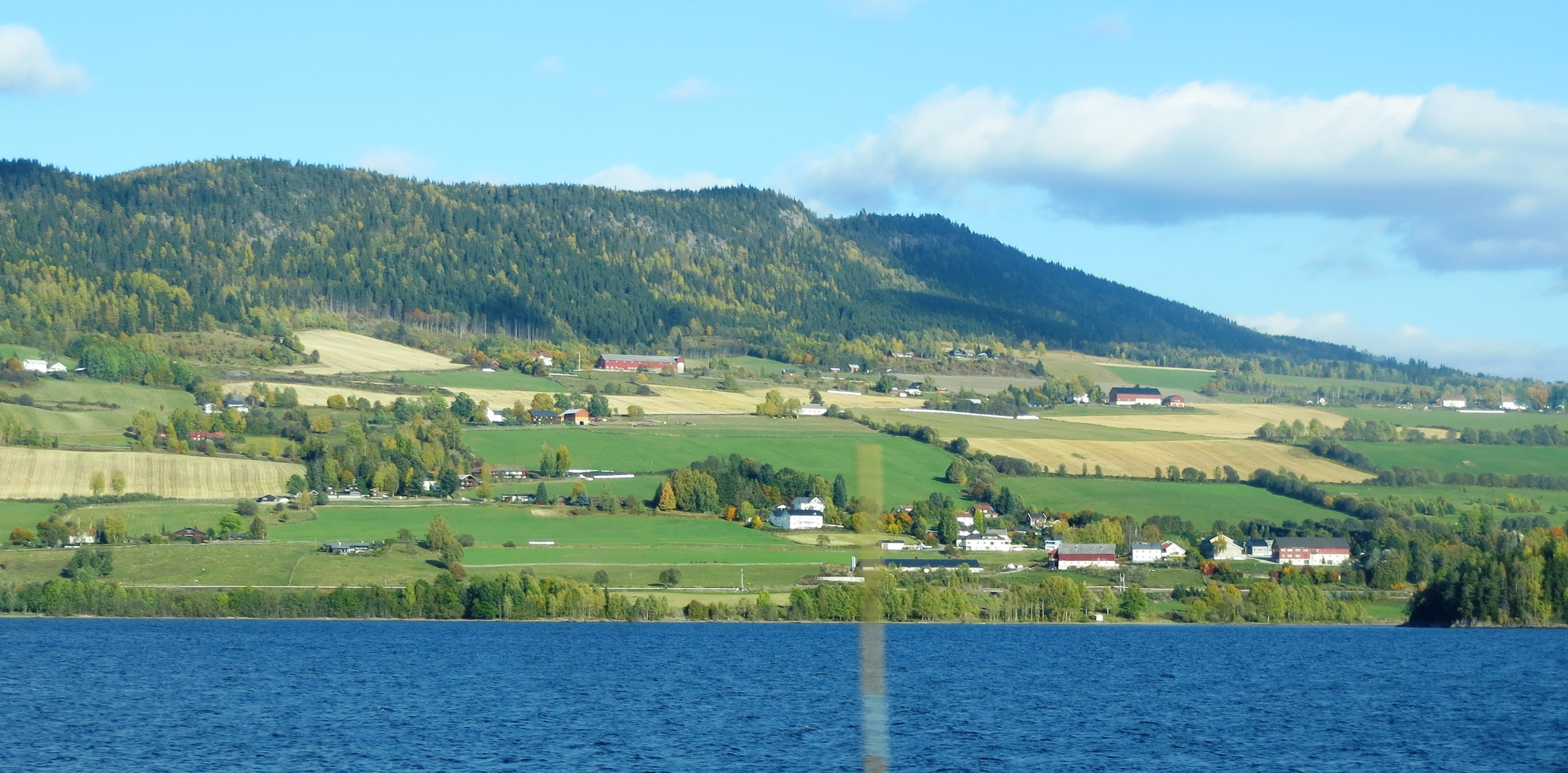
- View of the lake Mjøsa in Ringsaker

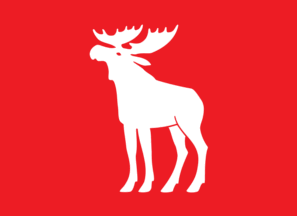
- Flag Coat of arms

- Innlandet within Norway

- Ringsaker within Innlandet
- Coordinates: 61°1′27″N 10°48′7″E
- Country: Norway
- County: Innlandet
- District: Hedmarken
- Established: 1 Jan 1838
- Administrative centre: Brumunddal

Government
  - Mayor (2023): Kai Ove Berg (H)

Area
  - Total: 1,280.09 km^{2} (494.25 sq mi)
  - Land: 1,122.57 km^{2} (433.43 sq mi)
  - Water: 157.52 km^{2} (60.82 sq mi) 12.3%
  - Rank: #77 in Norway
- Highest elevation: 1,090.51 m (3,577.8 ft)

Population (2025)
  - Total: 35,911
  - Rank: #30 in Norway
  - Density: 28.1/km^{2} (73/sq mi)
  - Change (10 years): ▲ +6.4%
- Demonym: Ringsaksokning

Official language
  - Norwegian form: Bokmål
- Time zone: UTC+01:00 (CET)
  - Summer (DST): UTC+02:00 (CEST)
- ISO 3166 code: NO-3411
- Website: Official website

Ringsaker is a municipality in Innlandet county, Norway. It is located in the traditional district of Hedmarken. The administrative centre of the municipality is the town of Brumunddal. Other settlements in Ringsaker include the town of Moelv and the villages of Furnes, Kvål, Kylstad, Mesnali, Nydal, Rudshøgda, Stavsjø, Tingnes, and Byflaten.

The 1,280-square-kilometre (490 sq mi) municipality is the 77th largest by area out of the 357 municipalities in Norway. Ringsaker Municipality is the 30th most populous municipality in Norway with a population of 35,911. The municipality's population density is 28.1 inhabitants per square kilometre (73/sq mi) and its population has increased by 6.4% over the previous 10-year period.

== General information ==
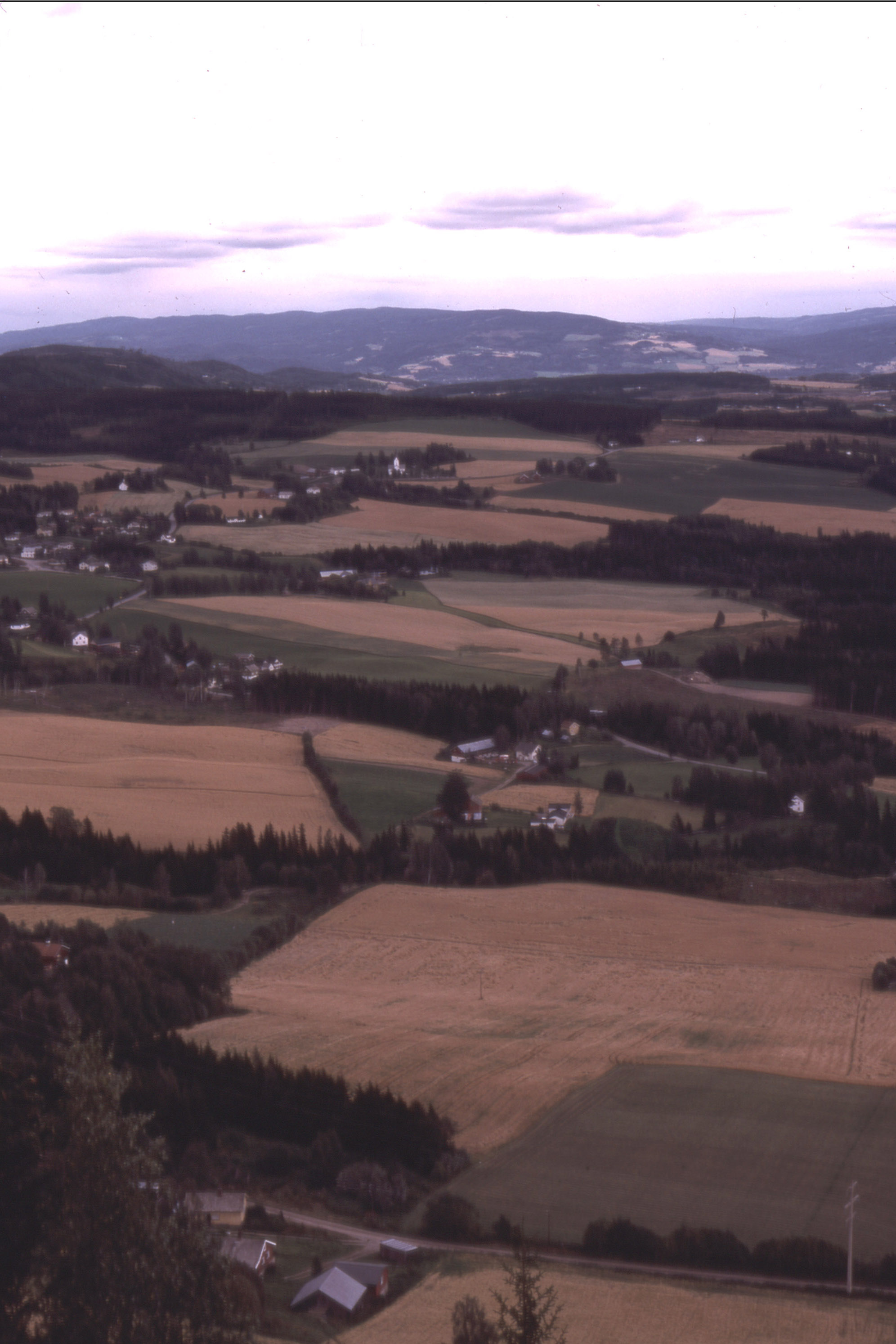
Ringsaker from Høsbjør mountain

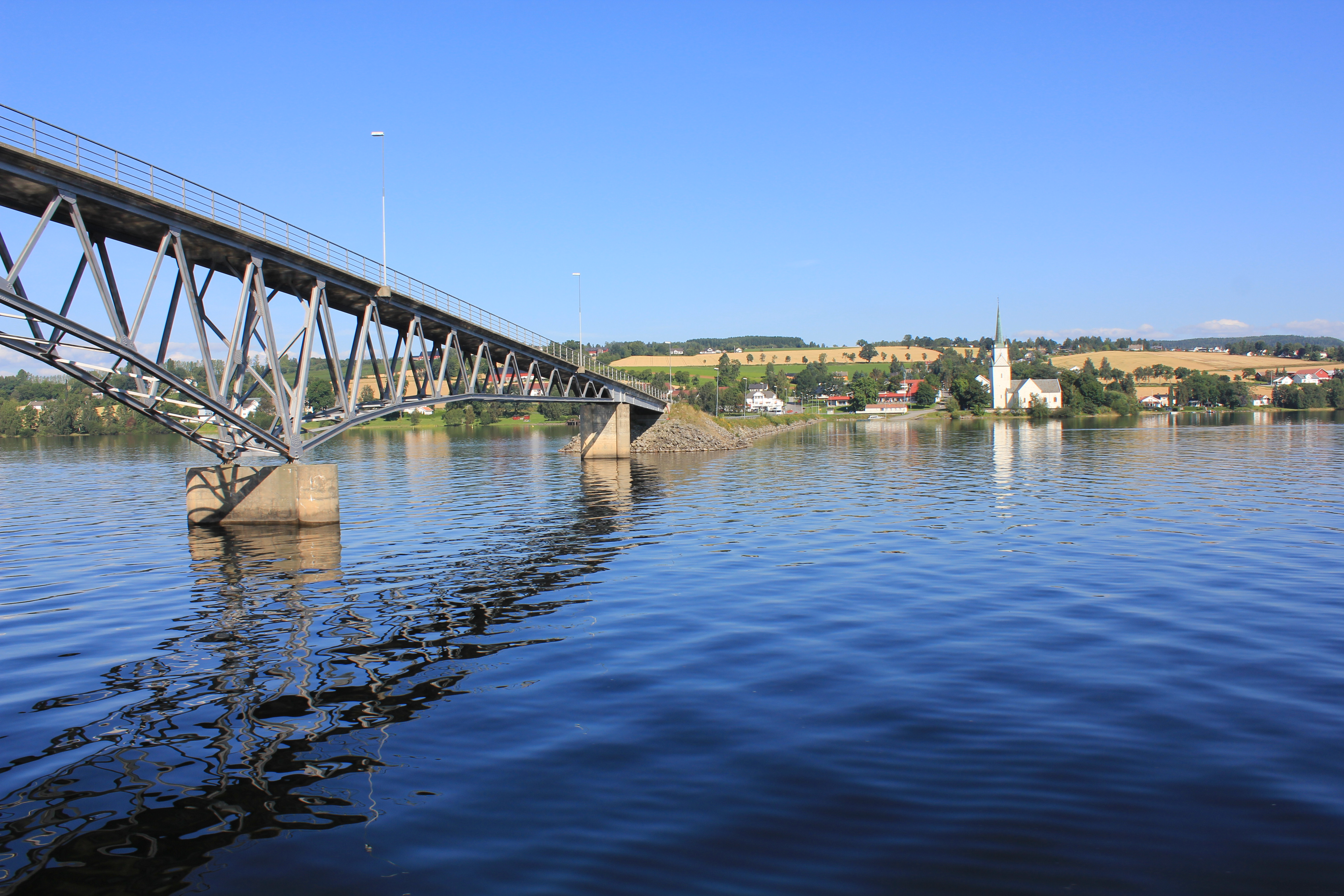
Looking towards Tingnes from Helgøya

The municipality of Ringsaker was established on 1 January 1838 (see formannskapsdistrikt law).

During the 1960s, there were many municipal mergers across Norway due to the work of the Schei Committee. On 1 January 1964, the following areas were merged to form a much larger Ringsaker Municipality:

- Ringsaker Municipality (population: 16,490)
- Furnes Municipality (population: 7,288)
- Nes Municipality (population: 4,184)
- the Hamarsberget and Vikersødegården exclave areas of Vang Municipality (population: 34)

On 1 January 1965, a part of Ringsaker Municipality (population: 100) was transferred to the neighboring Hamar Municipality. On 1 January 1967 there was a municipal land swap between Vang Municipality and Ringsaker Municipality. The 500-decare (120-acre) Stav, Valsigsvea, and Arnkvern Nedre areas of Vang (population: 50) was transferred to Ringsaker and the 450-decare (110-acre) Stensby and Holmlund areas of Ringsaker (population: 114) was transferred to Vang.

On 1 January 1992, the parts of the Stensby, Hanstad, Viker, and Stammerud areas of Ringsaker Municipality (population: 224) were transferred to the neighboring Hamar Municipality.

Historically, the municipality was part of the old Hedmark county. On 1 January 2020, the municipality became a part of the newly-formed Innlandet county (after Hedmark and Oppland counties were merged).

=== Name ===
The municipality (originally the parish) is named after the old Ringsaker farm (Old Norse: Ringisakr or Hringisakr) since the first Ringsaker Church was built there. The first element is the genitive case of ringir or ringi which has an unknown meaning. One possibility is that Ringir or Hringir ('Lord of the Ring') may have been an epithet or alias for the Norse god Ullr, based on a ceremony mentioned in the poem Atlakviða where an oath is sworn by hringi Ullar ('the ring of Ullr'). The last element is akr which means "acre" or "field".

=== Coat of arms ===
The coat of arms was granted on 1 February 1985. The official blazon is "Gules, an moose statant argent" (Norwegian: I rødt en stående sølv elg). This means the arms have a red field (background) and the charge is a moose. The moose has a tincture of argent which means it is commonly colored white, but if it is made out of metal, then silver is used. The moose design is inspired by the pre-historic cave paintings found at the Stein farm in Ringsaker, indicating the early inhabitation of the area. The arms were designed by Arne Løvstad. The municipal flag has the same design as the coat of arms.

=== Churches ===
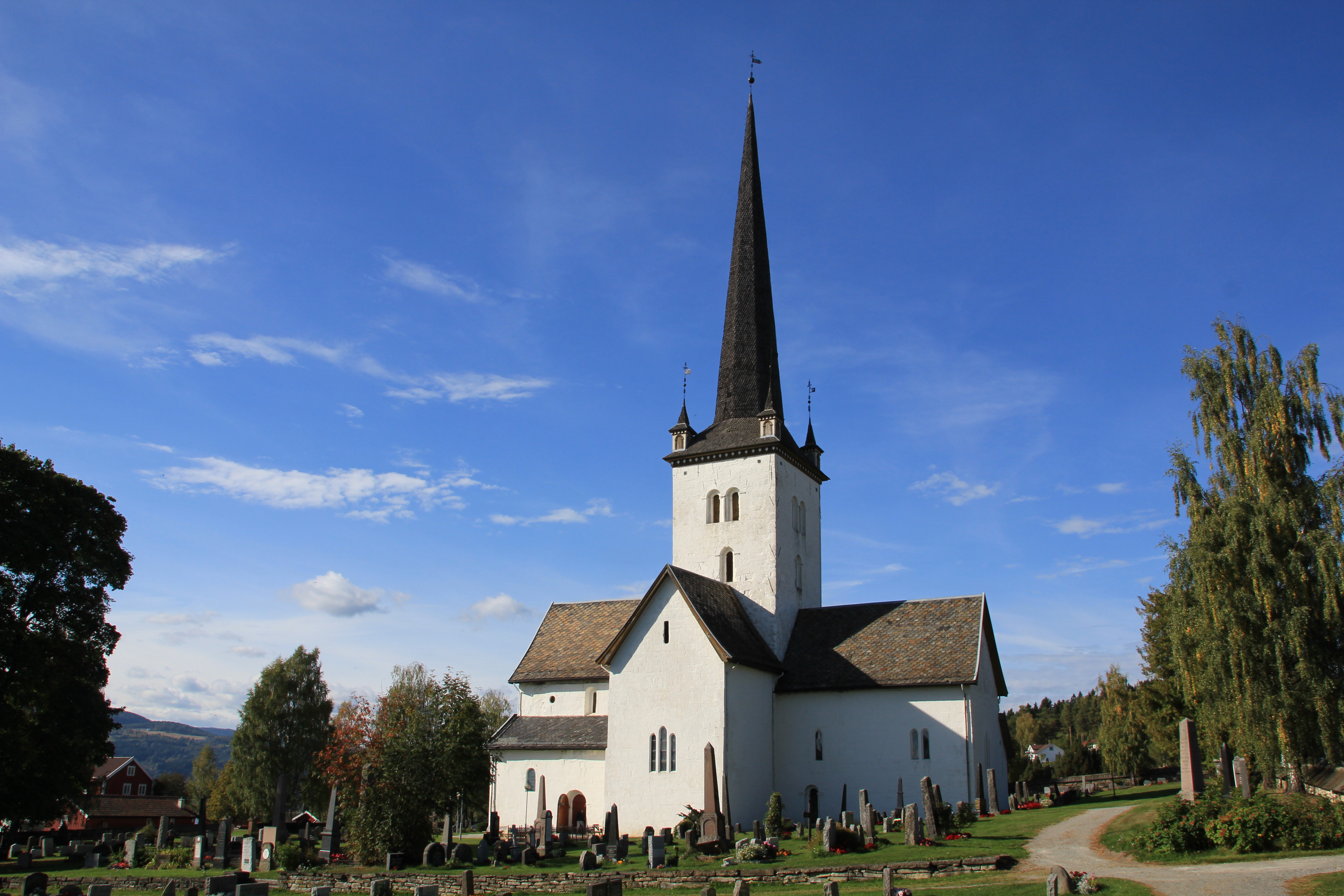
Ringsaker Church

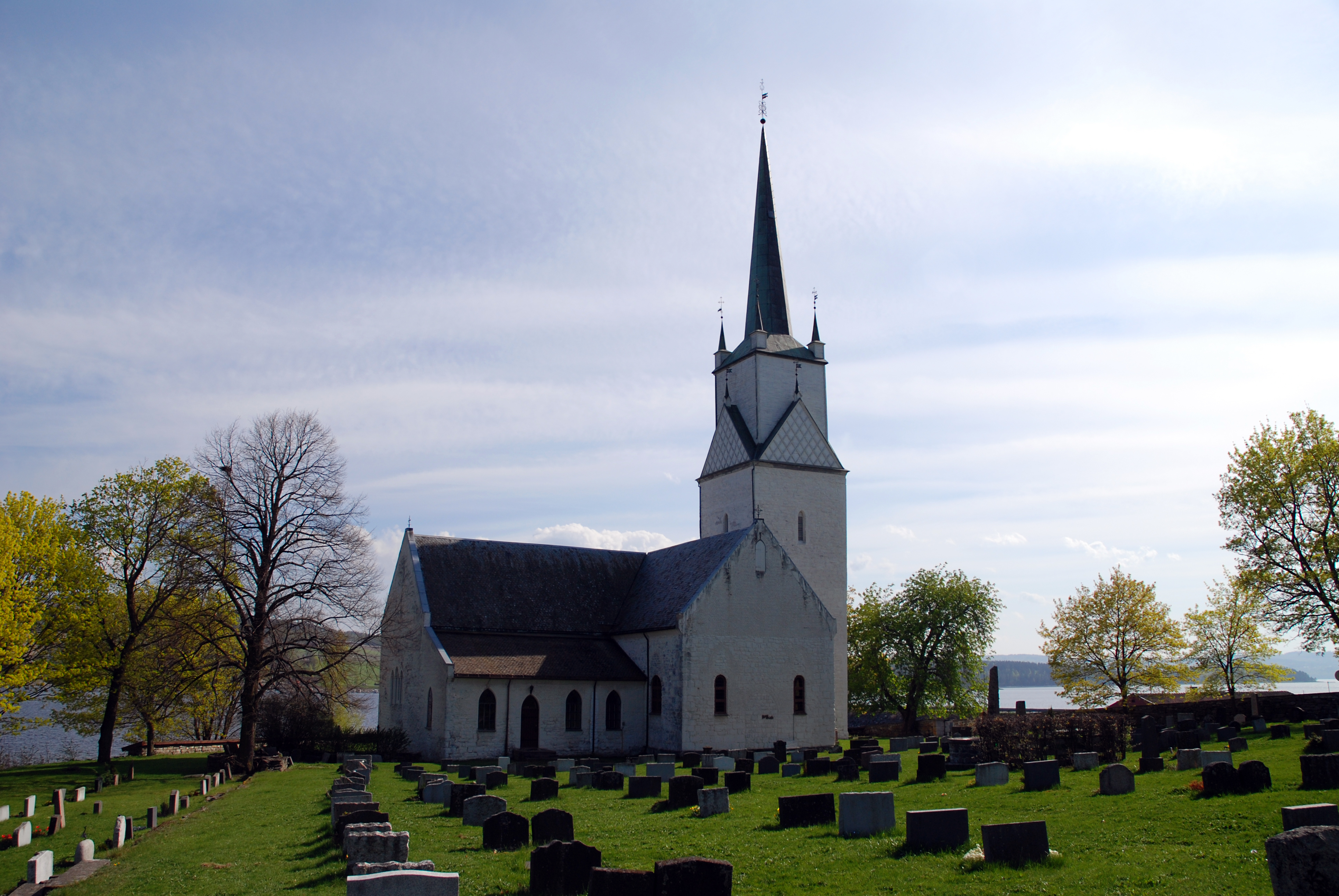
Nes Church

The Church of Norway has six parishes (sokn) within Ringsaker Municipality. The municipality makes up all of the Hamar domprosti (arch-deanery) within the Diocese of Hamar.

Churches in Ringsaker Municipality
Parish (sokn)	Church name	Location of the church	Year built
Brumunddal/Veldre	Brumunddal Church	Brumunddal	1965
Brumunddal/Veldre	Veldre Church	Byflaten	2000
Brøttum	Brøttum Church	Brøttum	1790
Brøttum	Mesnali Church	Mesnali	1933
Furnes	Furnes Church	Furnes	1707
Nes	Helgøya Church	Helgøya	1870
Nes	Nes Church	Tingnes	1250
Nes	Stavsjø Church	Stavsjø	1880
Ringsaker	Ringsaker Church	Moelv	1100s
Åsmarka	Åsmarka Church	Åsmarka	1859

== Geography ==
Ringsaker Municipality is located on the east side of the lake Mjøsa, the largest lake in Norway. It borders Lillehammer Municipality to the northwest; Øyer Municipality, Stor-Elvdal Municipality, and Åmot Municipality to the north; Hamar Municipality to the east; Stange Municipality and Østre Toten Municipality to the south; and Gjøvik Municipality to the west.

Ringsaker Municipality is situated in an agricultural and lumbering region. The municipality lies in the traditional district of Hedmarken which consists largely of rolling agricultural terrain, hilly green mountains, and pine forests. The Hedmarksvidda plateau is in the upper parts of the municipality. The highest point in the municipality is the 1,090.51-metre (3,577.8 ft) tall mountain Tua. The rivers Brumunda, Flakstadelva, and Moelva all flow through the municipality.

The principal urban centers in Ringsaker include the towns of Brumunddal and Moelv.

== Climate ==
Ringsaker Municipality has a humid continental climate (Dfb by the Köppen-Geiger system), with fairly dry and cold winters and pleasant summers. The driest month is February, and the wettest is August. In February 1996, a low of −31.4 °C (−24.5 °F)) was recorded. The all-time high is 33.5 °C (92.3 °F)) from July 2014. The Kise weather station has been recording since April 1951.

Climate data for Kise 1991-2020 (128 m)
Month	Jan	Feb	Mar	Apr	May	Jun	Jul	Aug	Sep	Oct	Nov	Dec	Year
Mean daily maximum °C (°F)	−1.6 (29.1)	−1.2 (29.8)	3.8 (38.8)	9.4 (48.9)	15.1 (59.2)	19.2 (66.6)	21.6 (70.9)	20.3 (68.5)	15.5 (59.9)	8.7 (47.7)	3.3 (37.9)	−0.6 (30.9)	9.5 (49.0)
Daily mean °C (°F)	−4.9 (23.2)	−5.1 (22.8)	−1 (30)	4 (39)	9.4 (48.9)	13.7 (56.7)	16.3 (61.3)	15.2 (59.4)	11 (52)	5.4 (41.7)	0.7 (33.3)	−3.6 (25.5)	5.1 (41.2)
Mean daily minimum °C (°F)	−8.3 (17.1)	−9 (16)	−5.2 (22.6)	−0.3 (31.5)	4.6 (40.3)	8.9 (48.0)	11.5 (52.7)	10.7 (51.3)	7 (45)	2.2 (36.0)	−1.9 (28.6)	−6.8 (19.8)	1.1 (34.1)
Average precipitation mm (inches)	46.6 (1.83)	24.5 (0.96)	26.3 (1.04)	31.4 (1.24)	54.3 (2.14)	67.9 (2.67)	72.3 (2.85)	85.3 (3.36)	57.8 (2.28)	56.5 (2.22)	49.5 (1.95)	35.8 (1.41)	608.2 (23.95)
Source: NOAA-WMO averages 91-2020 Norway

== Economy ==
The main industries of Ringsaker Municipality are agriculture, forestry, and diversified manufacturing. The area of Sjusjøen has a relatively large amount of holiday cottages that are especially attractive for outdoor sports including cross-country skiing vacations.

== Government ==
Ringsaker Municipality is responsible for primary education (through 10th grade), outpatient health services, senior citizen services, welfare and other social services, zoning, economic development, and municipal roads and utilities. The municipality is governed by a municipal council of directly elected representatives. The mayor is indirectly elected by a vote of the municipal council. The municipality is under the jurisdiction of the Hedmarken og Østerdal District Court and the Eidsivating Court of Appeal.

=== Municipal council ===
The municipal council (Kommunestyre) of Ringsaker Municipality is made up of 39 representatives that are elected to four year terms. The tables below show the current and historical composition of the council by political party.

Ringsaker kommunestyre 2023–2027
Party name (in Norwegian)	Number of representatives
Labour Party (Arbeiderpartiet)	12
Progress Party (Fremskrittspartiet)	4
Green Party (Miljøpartiet De Grønne)	1
Conservative Party (Høyre)	5
Industry and Business Party (Industri‑ og Næringspartiet)	1
Christian Democratic Party (Kristelig Folkeparti)	1
Pensioners' Party (Pensjonistpartiet)	4
Red Party (Rødt)	1
Centre Party (Senterpartiet)	6
Socialist Left Party (Sosialistisk Venstreparti)	2
Liberal Party (Venstre)	1
Ringsaker List (Ringsaklista)	1
Total number of members:	39

Ringsaker kommunestyre 2019–2023
Party name (in Norwegian)	Number of representatives
Labour Party (Arbeiderpartiet)	18
Progress Party (Fremskrittspartiet)	2
Green Party (Miljøpartiet De Grønne)	1
Conservative Party (Høyre)	3
Pensioners' Party (Pensjonistpartiet)	2
Red Party (Rødt)	1
Centre Party (Senterpartiet)	10
Socialist Left Party (Sosialistisk Venstreparti)	1
Ringsaker List (Ringsaklista)	1
Total number of members:	39

Ringsaker kommunestyre 2015–2019
Party name (in Norwegian)	Number of representatives
Labour Party (Arbeiderpartiet)	21
Progress Party (Fremskrittspartiet)	2
Green Party (Miljøpartiet De Grønne)	1
Conservative Party (Høyre)	4
Christian Democratic Party (Kristelig Folkeparti)	1
Pensioners' Party (Pensjonistpartiet)	2
Centre Party (Senterpartiet)	5
Socialist Left Party (Sosialistisk Venstreparti)	1
Liberal Party (Venstre)	1
Ringsaker List (Ringsaklista)	3
Total number of members:	41

Ringsaker kommunestyre 2011–2015
Party name (in Norwegian)	Number of representatives
Labour Party (Arbeiderpartiet)	21
Progress Party (Fremskrittspartiet)	2
Conservative Party (Høyre)	6
Christian Democratic Party (Kristelig Folkeparti)	1
Pensioners' Party (Pensjonistpartiet)	1
Centre Party (Senterpartiet)	3
Socialist Left Party (Sosialistisk Venstreparti)	1
Liberal Party (Venstre)	2
Ringsaker List (Ringsakerlista)	4
Total number of members:	41

Ringsaker kommunestyre 2007–2011
Party name (in Norwegian)	Number of representatives
Labour Party (Arbeiderpartiet)	16
Progress Party (Fremskrittspartiet)	4
Conservative Party (Høyre)	4
Christian Democratic Party (Kristelig Folkeparti)	1
Centre Party (Senterpartiet)	4
Socialist Left Party (Sosialistisk Venstreparti)	3
Liberal Party (Venstre)	3
Ringsaker List (Ringsaklista)	6
Total number of members:	41

Ringsaker kommunestyre 2003–2007
Party name (in Norwegian)	Number of representatives
Labour Party (Arbeiderpartiet)	20
Progress Party (Fremskrittspartiet)	4
Conservative Party (Høyre)	4
Christian Democratic Party (Kristelig Folkeparti)	1
Centre Party (Senterpartiet)	6
Socialist Left Party (Sosialistisk Venstreparti)	5
Liberal Party (Venstre)	1
Total number of members:	41

Ringsaker kommunestyre 1999–2003
Party name (in Norwegian)	Number of representatives
Labour Party (Arbeiderpartiet)	30
Progress Party (Fremskrittspartiet)	5
Conservative Party (Høyre)	8
Christian Democratic Party (Kristelig Folkeparti)	3
Centre Party (Senterpartiet)	8
Socialist Left Party (Sosialistisk Venstreparti)	6
Liberal Party (Venstre)	1
Total number of members:	61

Ringsaker kommunestyre 1995–1999
Party name (in Norwegian)	Number of representatives
Labour Party (Arbeiderpartiet)	35
Conservative Party (Høyre)	7
Christian Democratic Party (Kristelig Folkeparti)	2
Centre Party (Senterpartiet)	12
Socialist Left Party (Sosialistisk Venstreparti)	4
Liberal Party (Venstre)	1
Total number of members:	61

Ringsaker kommunestyre 1991–1995
Party name (in Norwegian)	Number of representatives
Labour Party (Arbeiderpartiet)	29
Progress Party (Fremskrittspartiet)	1
Conservative Party (Høyre)	8
Christian Democratic Party (Kristelig Folkeparti)	2
Centre Party (Senterpartiet)	11
Socialist Left Party (Sosialistisk Venstreparti)	10
Total number of members:	61

Ringsaker kommunestyre 1987–1991
Party name (in Norwegian)	Number of representatives
Labour Party (Arbeiderpartiet)	37
Conservative Party (Høyre)	11
Christian Democratic Party (Kristelig Folkeparti)	2
Centre Party (Senterpartiet)	7
Socialist Left Party (Sosialistisk Venstreparti)	4
Total number of members:	61

Ringsaker kommunestyre 1983–1987
Party name (in Norwegian)	Number of representatives
Labour Party (Arbeiderpartiet)	37
Progress Party (Fremskrittspartiet)	2
Conservative Party (Høyre)	9
Christian Democratic Party (Kristelig Folkeparti)	2
Centre Party (Senterpartiet)	7
Socialist Left Party (Sosialistisk Venstreparti)	3
Freely elected representatives (Frie Folkevalgte)	1
Total number of members:	61

Ringsaker kommunestyre 1979–1983
Party name (in Norwegian)	Number of representatives
Labour Party (Arbeiderpartiet)	37
Conservative Party (Høyre)	10
Christian Democratic Party (Kristelig Folkeparti)	2
Centre Party (Senterpartiet)	9
Socialist Left Party (Sosialistisk Venstreparti)	2
Freely elected representatives (Frie Folkevalgte)	1
Total number of members:	61

Ringsaker kommunestyre 1975–1979
Party name (in Norwegian)	Number of representatives
Labour Party (Arbeiderpartiet)	38
Conservative Party (Høyre)	6
Christian Democratic Party (Kristelig Folkeparti)	3
Centre Party (Senterpartiet)	10
Socialist Left Party (Sosialistisk Venstreparti)	2
Joint list of the Liberal Party (Venstre) and New People's Party (Nye Folkepartiet)	1
Politically independent (Politisk Uavhengige)	1
Total number of members:	61

Ringsaker kommunestyre 1971–1975
Party name (in Norwegian)	Number of representatives
Labour Party (Arbeiderpartiet)	39
Conservative Party (Høyre)	6
Christian Democratic Party (Kristelig Folkeparti)	2
Centre Party (Senterpartiet)	11
Local List(s) (Lokale lister)	3
Total number of members:	61

Ringsaker kommunestyre 1967–1971
Party name (in Norwegian)	Number of representatives
Labour Party (Arbeiderpartiet)	40
Conservative Party (Høyre)	6
Christian Democratic Party (Kristelig Folkeparti)	1
Centre Party (Senterpartiet)	10
Socialist People's Party (Sosialistisk Folkeparti)	2
Liberal Party (Venstre)	2
Total number of members:	61

Ringsaker kommunestyre 1963–1967
Party name (in Norwegian)	Number of representatives
Labour Party (Arbeiderpartiet)	40
Conservative Party (Høyre)	7
Communist Party (Kommunistiske Parti)	1
Christian Democratic Party (Kristelig Folkeparti)	2
Centre Party (Senterpartiet)	9
Liberal Party (Venstre)	2
Total number of members:	61

Ringsaker herredsstyre 1959–1963
Party name (in Norwegian)	Number of representatives
Labour Party (Arbeiderpartiet)	32
Conservative Party (Høyre)	4
Communist Party (Kommunistiske Parti)	2
Christian Democratic Party (Kristelig Folkeparti)	2
Centre Party (Senterpartiet)	8
Liberal Party (Venstre)	3
Total number of members:	51

Ringsaker herredsstyre 1955–1959
Party name (in Norwegian)	Number of representatives
Labour Party (Arbeiderpartiet)	33
Conservative Party (Høyre)	5
Communist Party (Kommunistiske Parti)	2
Farmers' Party (Bondepartiet)	8
Liberal Party (Venstre)	3
Total number of members:	51

Ringsaker herredsstyre 1951–1955
Party name (in Norwegian)	Number of representatives
Labour Party (Arbeiderpartiet)	32
Conservative Party (Høyre)	6
Communist Party (Kommunistiske Parti)	2
Farmers' Party (Bondepartiet)	8
Total number of members:	48

Ringsaker herredsstyre 1947–1951
Party name (in Norwegian)	Number of representatives
Labour Party (Arbeiderpartiet)	30
Conservative Party (Høyre)	5
Communist Party (Kommunistiske Parti)	3
Farmers' Party (Bondepartiet)	7
Joint list of the Liberal Party (Venstre) and the Radical People's Party (Radikale Folkepartiet)	1
Joint List(s) of Non-Socialist Parties (Borgerlige Felleslister)	2
Total number of members:	48

Ringsaker herredsstyre 1945–1947
Party name (in Norwegian)	Number of representatives
Labour Party (Arbeiderpartiet)	30
Conservative Party (Høyre)	2
Communist Party (Kommunistiske Parti)	5
Farmers' Party (Bondepartiet)	3
Liberal Party (Venstre)	1
Joint List(s) of Non-Socialist Parties (Borgerlige Felleslister)	7
Total number of members:	48

Ringsaker herredsstyre 1937–1940*
Party name (in Norwegian)	Number of representatives
Labour Party (Arbeiderpartiet)	28
Conservative Party (Høyre)	4
Farmers' Party (Bondepartiet)	7
Joint list of Liberal Party and Small farm-holders (Venstre og Småbrukere)	1
Joint List(s) of Non-Socialist Parties (Borgerlige Felleslister)	2
Local List(s) (Lokale lister)	6
Total number of members:	48
Note: Due to the German occupation of Norway during World War II, no elections were held for new municipal councils until after the war ended in 1945.

=== Mayors ===
The mayor (Norwegian: ordfører) of Ringsaker Municipality is the political leader of the municipality and the chairperson of the municipal council. Here is a list of people who have held this position:

- 1838–1839: Henrik Anker Steen
- 1839–1843: Simen Flifleth
- 1843–1847: Michael Kildal
- 1847–1851: Peter A. Schjelderup
- 1851–1853: Arne Mæhlum
- 1853–1857: Simen Flifleth
- 1857–1861: Michael Kildal
- 1861–1867: August Konow
- 1867–1869: Christian Dæhli
- 1869–1873: Iver Hersoug
- 1873–1877: Halvor Skappel
- 1877–1883: Even Larsen Glestad (V)
- 1883–1885: Halvor Skappel (V)
- 1885–1889: Johannes Hjelmstad (V)
- 1889–1893: Halvor Skappel (V)
- 1893–1895: Anders Asla (H)
- 1895–1901: Thore Røhr (V)
- 1902–1904: Peder Ulven (H)
- 1905–1910: Jørgen Opsal (V)
- 1911–1913: Hans Skappel (V)
- 1914–1919: Axel Krogvig (FV)
- 1920–1925: Jørgen Haakenaasen (Bp)
- 1926–1928: Karl Røhrsveen (Bp)
- 1929–1931: Karsten Fonstad (Ap)
- 1932–1941: Karl Østvold (Ap)
- 1941–1942: Oskar Kjonerud (NS)
- 1942–1945: Anders Rud (NS)
- 1945–1964: Karl Østvold (Ap)
- 1965–1981: Peder Esbjørnsen (Ap)
- 1982–1991: Magne Johansen (Ap)
- 1991–2007: Thor Lillehovde (Ap)
- 2007–2023: Anita Ihle Steen (Ap)
- 2023–present: Kai Ove Berg (H)

== History ==
Number of minorities (1st and 2nd generation) in Ringsker by country of origin in 2017
Ancestry	Number
Poland	555
Lithuania	233
Vietnam	186
Somalia	140
Sweden	118
Germany	116
Estonia	109
Thailand	106
Latvia	93
Denmark	90
Netherlands	88
Bulgaria	85

=== Harald Hårfagre in 882 ===
The area of Ringsaker is first mentioned in King Harald Hårfagre's Saga, in the Heimskringla by Snorri Sturluson. The saga reports that Harald Hårfagre (872–930) was but ten years old when he succeeded his father (Halfdan the Black). After Halfdan the Black's death, many chiefs coveted the dominions he had left. Among these King Gandalf was the first; then Högne and Fróði, sons of King Eystein of Hedemark; and also King Hogne Karuson of Ringerike.

Hake, the son of Gandalf, led an expedition of 300 men against Vestfold. King Harald's army, led by Guthorm, met and fought a great battle, and King Harald was victorious, killing king Hake. Then King Harald turned back, but King Gandalf had come to Vestfold so they defeated him also. When the sons of King Eystein in Hedemark heard the news, they proposed to meet at Ringsaker in Hedemark with the remaining kings, Hogne Karuson and Herse Gudbrand. King Harald and Guthorm found out where the Oppland kings were meeting, and coming undetected at night, set fire to the houses in which Hogne Karuson and Herse Gudbrand slept. King Eystein's two sons and their men fought, but both Hogne and Frode died.

After the fall of these kings, King Harald had subdued Hedemark, Ringerike, Gudbrandsdal, Hadeland, Thoten, Romerike, and the whole northern part of Vingulmark. In addition, King Gandalf was slain, and King Harald took the whole of his kingdom as far south as the river Raum (Glomma).

=== Saint Olaf in 1018 ===
Ringsaker is again mentioned in a saga about 1018 when Olaf (later Saint Olaf) sent people to advise the Opplands that he was coming, as it was custom for the king to live as guest there every third year. In the autumn, he left Sarpsborg and went first to Vingulmark. He inquired about their Christianity, teaching some and punishing others. He went through that district, and on to Romerike. Christianity was weaker there and he punished all who had not obeyed his word. The king of Romerike proceeded to Ringsaker, to consult King Hrorek of Hedemark. They sent messages to King Gudrod of Gudbrandsdal, and to the King of Hadaland, inviting them to meet at Hedemark. The kings agreed to resist Olaf. They summoned the leaders from their kingdoms, and when they had assembled, the kings directed them to gather warriors. Most approved of the measure, but the kings were betrayed to Olav by Ketil Kavl of Ringanes (the southernmost district in Hedemark, Stange), who proceeded rapidly down lake Mjøsa to Eid, where Olaf was then located.

King Olaf, accompanied by 400 men, arrived at Ringsaker before the next day dawned. Ketil knew where the kings slept, and Olaf had all these houses surrounded. The kings were taken prisoners. King Hrorek's eyes were put out. King Gudrod's tongue was cut out. King Ring and two others were banished from Norway. King Olaf took possession of the land these kings had possessed, and after this Olaf alone bore the title of king in Norway.

=== Sigurd of Røyr in 1163 ===
Sigurd of Røyr, who was Haakon II's champion, lived at Røyr (Rør) in Ringsaker. He died at Re in 1163.

== Institutions ==
An SOS Children's Village has been planned for Ringsaker which will be Norway's second such village.

== Notable people ==
=== Public service ===
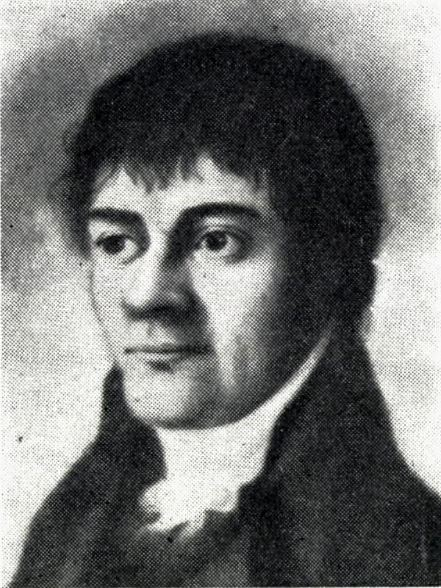
Jens Rynning

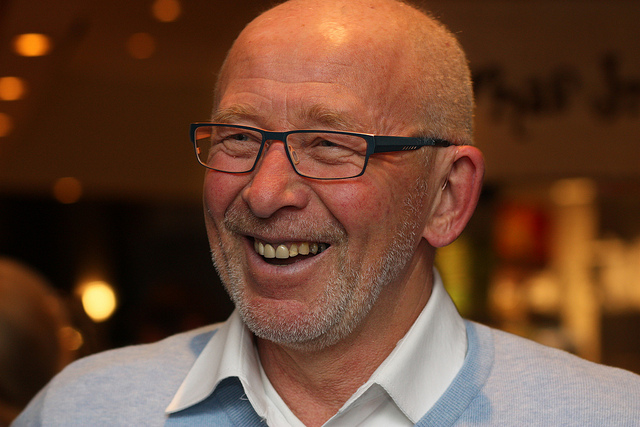
Thor Lillehovde, 2012

- Eilert Waldemar Preben Ramm (1769 in Furnes – 1837), a Norwegian military officer and representative at the Norwegian Constitutional Assembly in 1814
- Jens Rynning (1778–1857), a priest and public education advocate, worked in Ringsaker
- Hovel Helseth (1779 in Nes – 1865), an industrial pioneer in the Norwegian textile industry
- Gustav Heiberg (1856 in Nes – 1935), a barrister, politician, and pre-WWI mayor of Hamar
- Adolph M. Christianson (1877 in Brumunddal – 1954), a justice of the North Dakota Supreme Court
- Johannes Bøe (1891 in Ringsaker – 1971), an archaeologist
- Sven Sømme (1904 in Ringsaker – 1961), a zoologist and ichthyologist and WWII XU activist
- Helge Skappel (1907 in Ringsaker – 2001), an aviator, photographer, and cartographer
- Peter A. Munch (1908 in Nes – 1984), a sociologist, academic, author, and US emigrant who twice worked on Tristan da Cunha
- Imre Hercz (1929–2011), a Jewish Hungarian-Norwegian physician and public debater who worked in Brumunddal
- Thor Lillehovde (born 1948 in Ringsaker), a politician and mayor of Ringsaker from 1991 to 2007

=== The arts ===
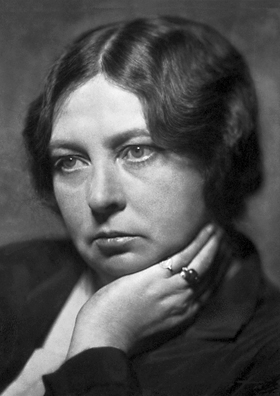
Sigrid Undset, 1928

- Lars Pinnerud (1700 in Furnes – 1762), a farmer and woodcarver
- Peder Balke (1804–1887), a painter of romantic and dramatic landscapes who was brought up in Ringsaker
- Ole Rynning (1809 in Ringsaker – 1838), an emigrant pioneer and author
- Gudmund Stenersen (1863 in Ringsaker – 1934), a painter, illustrator, and dentist
- Tryggve Andersen (1866 in Ringsaker – 1920), a novelist, poet, and storywriter
- Sigrid Undset (1882–1949), an author who was awarded the 1928 Nobel Prize for Literature and was buried at Mesnali
- Nils Johan Rud (1908 in Ringsaker – 1993), a novelist, writer of short stories, and magazine editor
- Alf Prøysen (1914 in Ringsaker – 1970), an author, poet, playwright, songwriter, and musician
- Jon Balke (born 1955 in Furnes), a jazz pianist who leads the Magnetic North Orchestra
- Helge Lien (born 1975 in Moelv), a jazz pianist, composer, band leader, and photographer
- Julia Schacht (born 1982 on Helgøya), an actress
- Gaute Ormåsen (born 1983 in Brumunddal), a singer

=== Sport ===
- Olivius Skymoen (1857 in Grefsheim – 1909), a sports shooter who competed at the 1908 Summer Olympics
- Kolbjørn Kvam (1865 in Nes – 1933), a sports shooter who competed at the 1908 Summer Olympics
- Ansten Samuelstuen (1929 in Brøttum – 2012), a Norwegian-American ski jumper who competed in the 1960 and 1964 Winter Olympics
- Ole Ellefsæter (born 1939 in Furnes), a retired cross-country skier who won two gold medals at the 1968 Winter Olympics
- Mia Svele (born 2001 in Ringsaker), a handball player

== Gallery ==
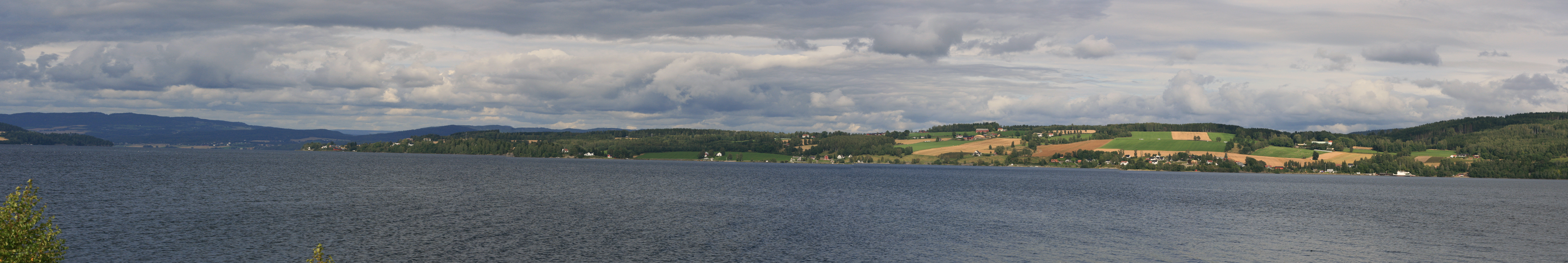
