= Brøttum Church =

Church in Innlandet, Norway

- Brøttum kirke
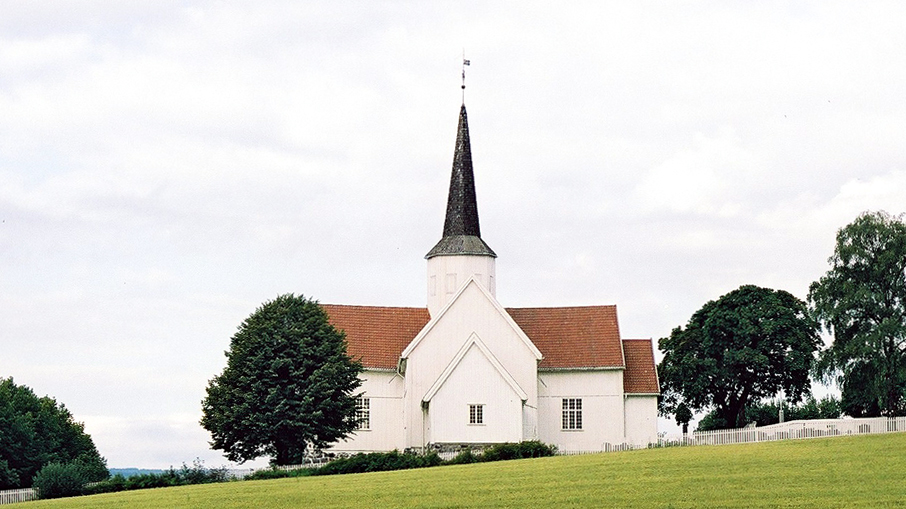
- View of the church
- Brøttum Church
- 61°01′42″N 10°33′00″E
- Location: Ringsaker Municipality, Innlandet
- Country: Norway
- Denomination: Church of Norway
- Previous denomination: Catholic Church
- Churchmanship: Evangelical Lutheran

History
- Status: Parish church
- Founded: 13th century
- Consecrated: 17 October 1790

Architecture
- Functional status: Active
- Architect: Amund Nilsen Gloppe
- Architectural type: Cruciform
- Completed: 1790 (236 years ago)

Specifications
- Capacity: 330
- Materials: Wood

Administration
- Diocese: Hamar bispedømme
- Deanery: Ringsaker prosti
- Parish: Brøttum
- Norwegian Cultural Heritage Site
- Type: Church
- Status: Automatically protected
- ID: 83967

Brøttum Church (Norwegian: Brøttum kirke) is a parish church of the Church of Norway in Ringsaker Municipality in Innlandet county, Norway. It is located in the village of Brøttum. It is one of the churches for the Brøttum parish which is part of the Ringsaker prosti (deanery) in the Diocese of Hamar. The white, wooden church was built in a cruciform design in 1790 using plans drawn up by Amund Nilsen Gloppe. The church seats about 330 people.

== History ==
The earliest existing historical records of the church date back to the year 1370, but the church was not new that year. The first church in Brøttum was a wooden stave church. This church was likely built during the 13th century. Around the year 1411, the church was renovated and repaired. Eventually, this church fell into disrepair and needed to be replaced. In 1629, the old church was torn down and a new log building was constructed on the same site. The church got a tower in 1636 and in 1684, a new church porch with an attic was built. A crucifix was made by Jens Strammerud for this church in 1735 which now hangs in the present church. The church was extensively restored in 1729.

By the late 1700s, the church was in need of replacement. Plans were to build a new wooden cruciform building was built next to the old church (a little south of the old church). Construction began on 5 May 1788, and the church was consecrated on 17 October 1790 although it was not completely finished until 1792. In 1793, the old church was torn down and its salvageable materials were sold at auction.

In 1841, the church got exterior wood siding that was painted white. In 1885–1888, a new floor was laid in the church and the sacristy, and the foundation wall was partially replaced. In 1932, Borgar Hauglid made stained glass windows for the windows in the choir's side walls. In 1951–1952 there was a major restoration with Halvor Vreim as a consultant. Windows were replaced, and coffin rooms were built under the southern transept. Old horse stables were demolished and a new outbuilding with bathrooms was built. The builder for this restoration project was Harald Sveum. The church was rededicated on 3 August 1952 when all the work was finished.

== Media gallery ==
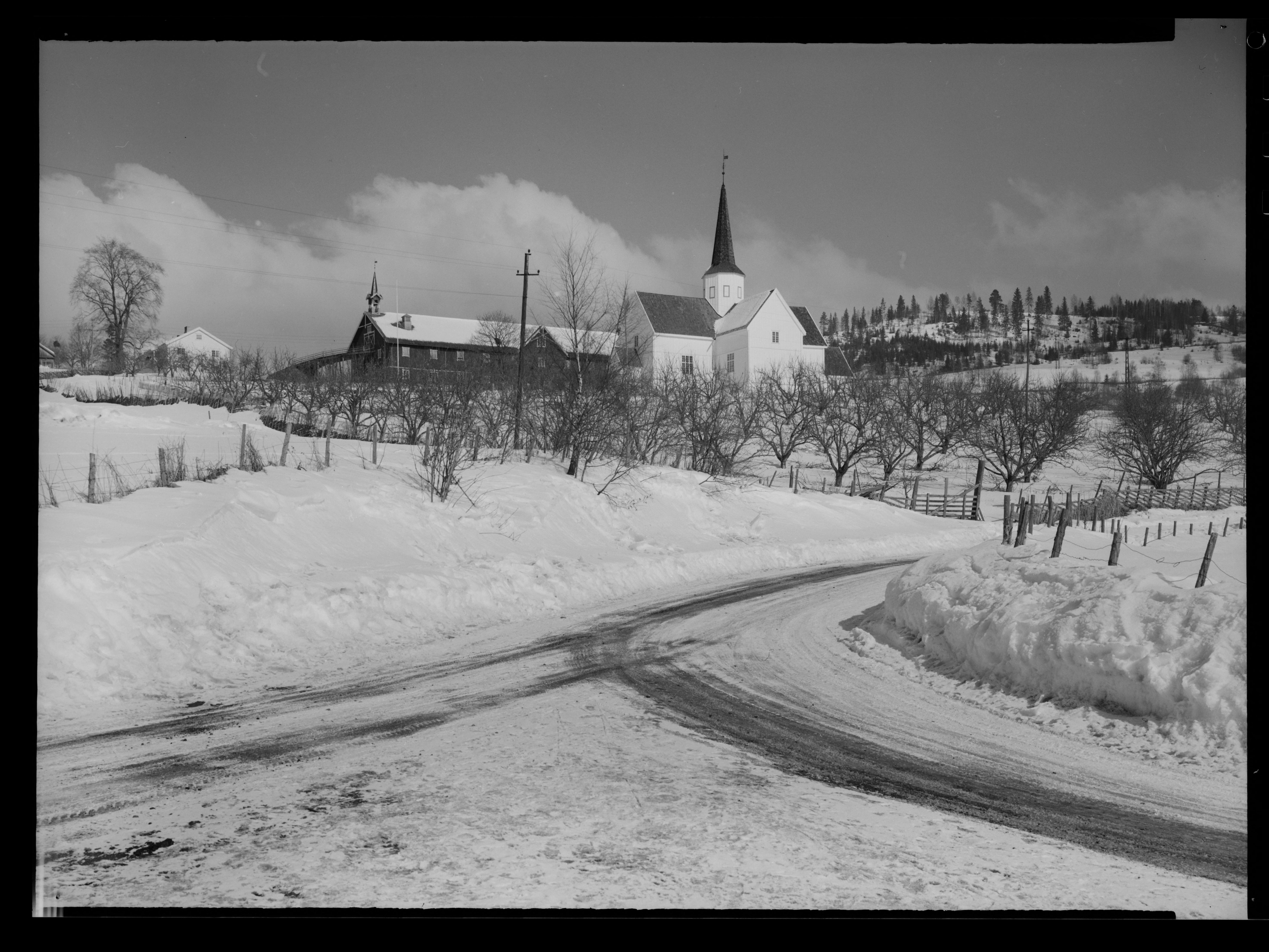

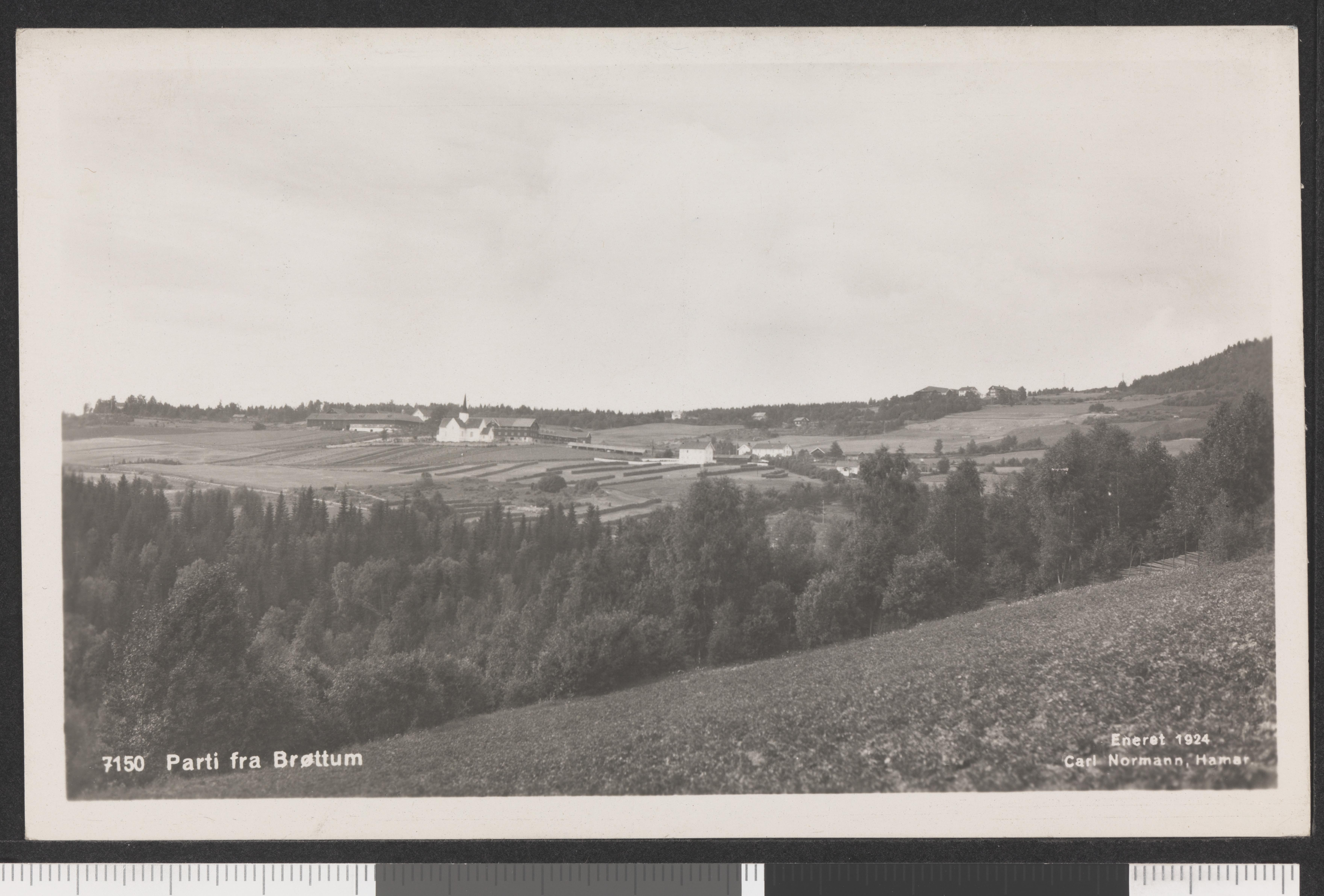

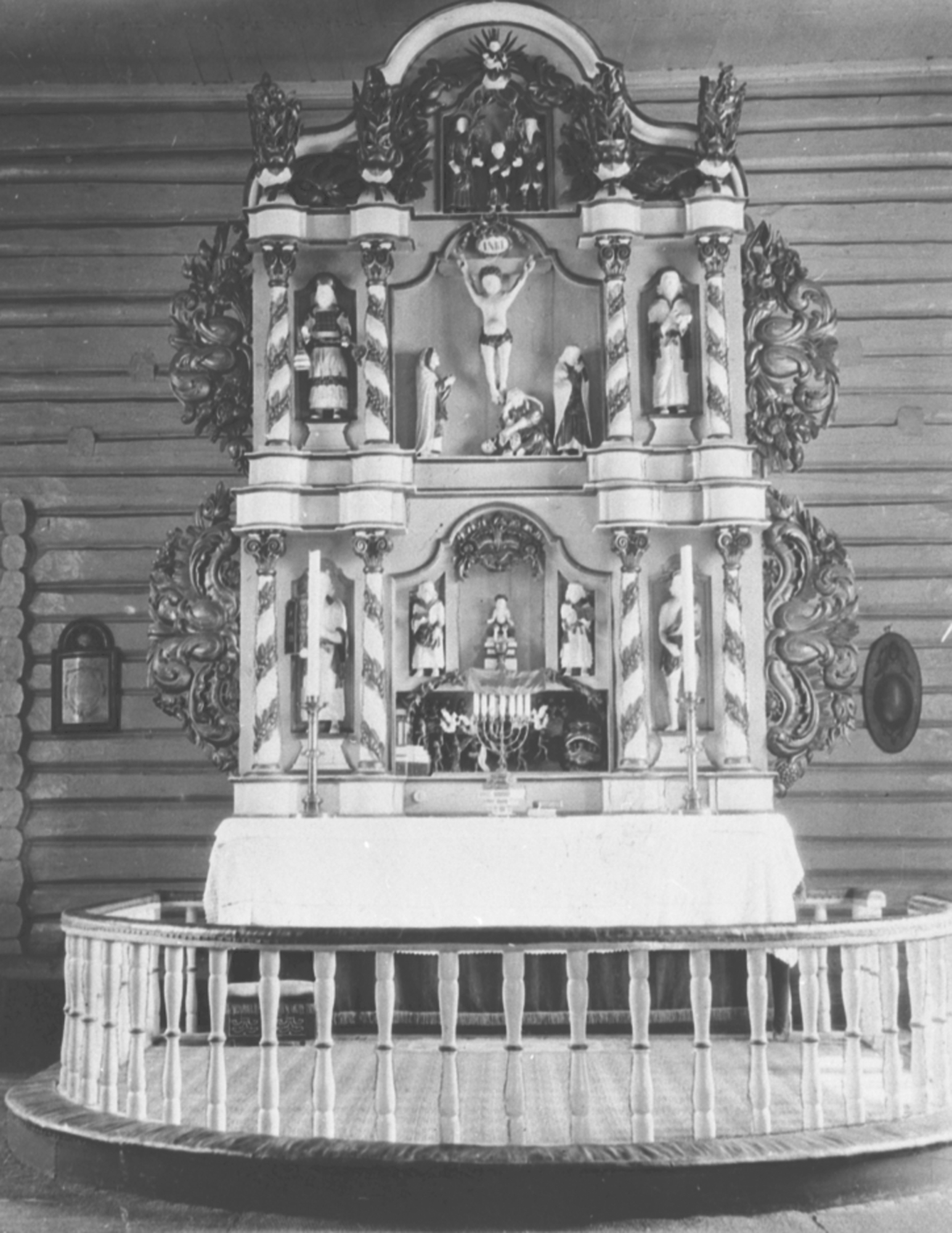

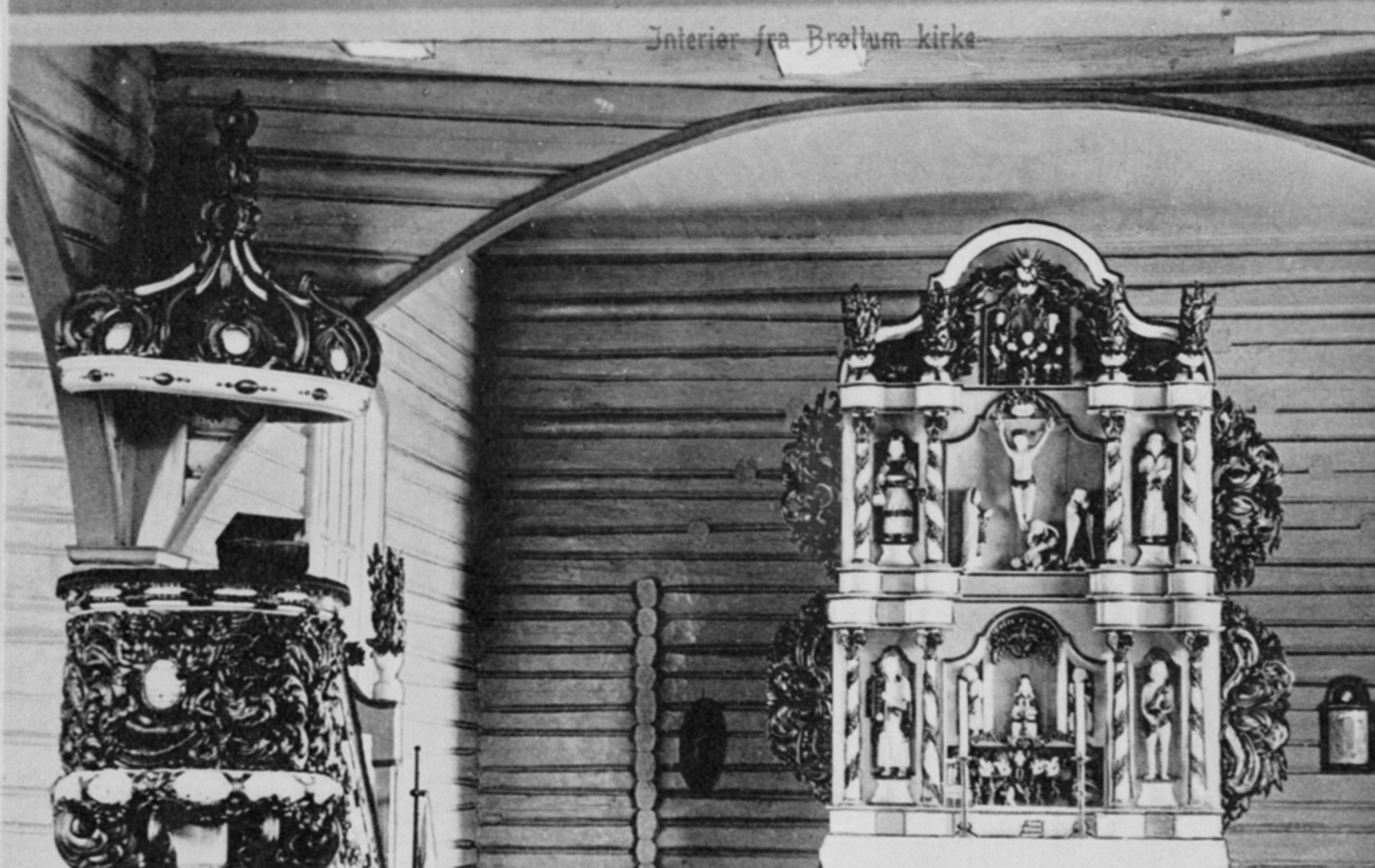

== See also ==
- List of churches in Hamar
