= Brumunddal =

Town in Innlandet, Norway

- Town/City
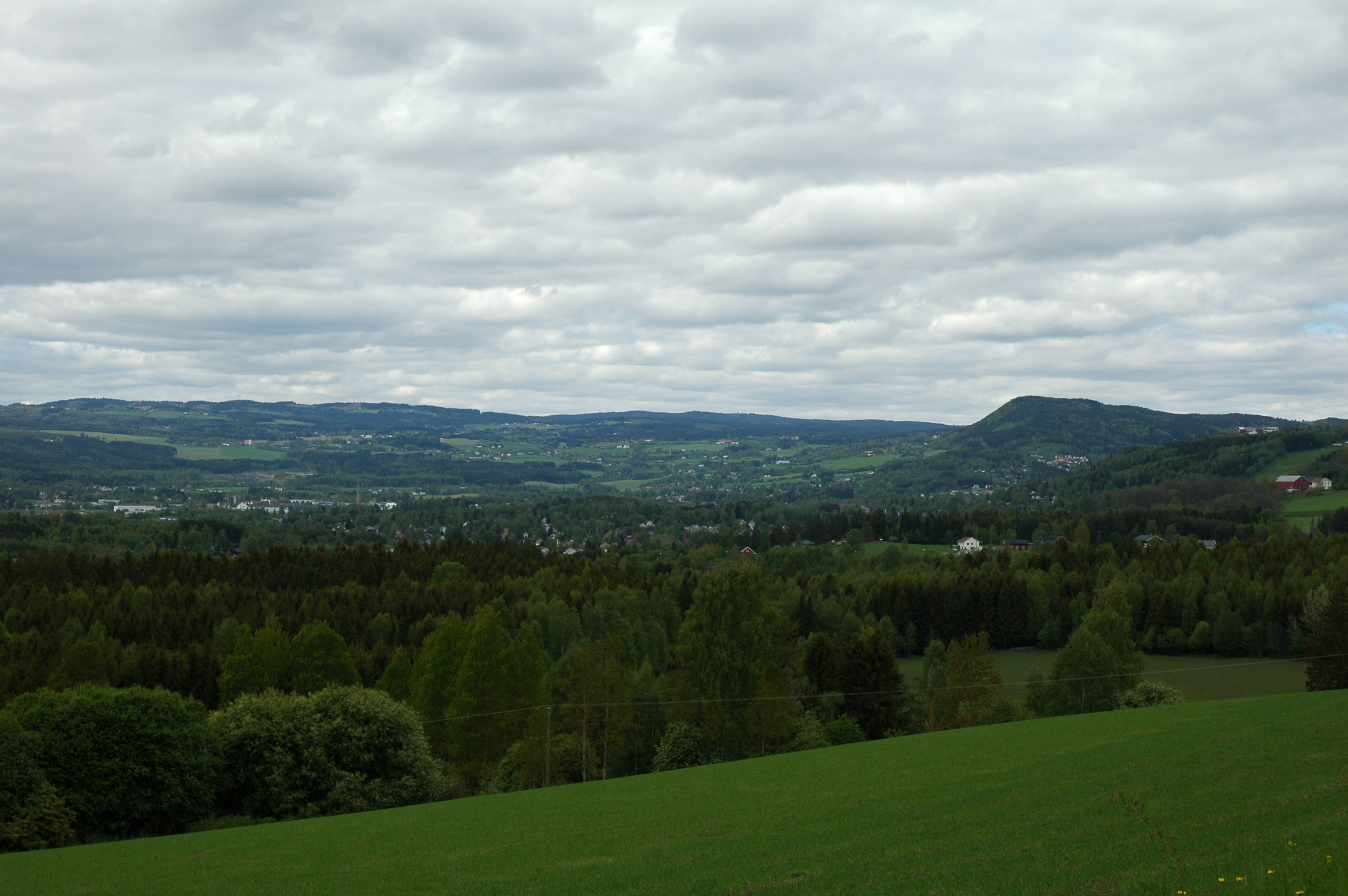
- View of the town from the south
- Interactive map of Brumunddal
- Location within Innlandet Location within Norway
- Coordinates: 60.88362°N 10.94489°E
- Country: Norway
- Region: Eastern Norway
- County: Innlandet
- District: Hedmarken
- Municipality: Ringsaker Municipality
- Established as
- Town (By): 2010

Area
  - Total: 7.34 km^{2} (2.83 sq mi)
- Elevation: 134 m (440 ft)

Population (2024)
  - Total: 11,337
  - Density: 1,545/km^{2} (4,000/sq mi)
- Demonym: Brumunddøl
- Time zone: UTC+01:00 (CET)
  - Summer (DST): UTC+02:00 (CEST)
- Post Code: 2380 Brumunddal

Brumunddal is a town in Ringsaker Municipality in Innlandet county, Norway. The town is the administrative centre of the municipality. It is located on the shores of the lake Mjøsa, about 10 kilometres (6.2 mi) north of the town of Hamar. The town is a small, densely populated area surrounded by countryside and farms. It is situated at the mouth of river Brumunda, running from the highlands into lake Mjøsa. Brumunddal Church is located in the village.

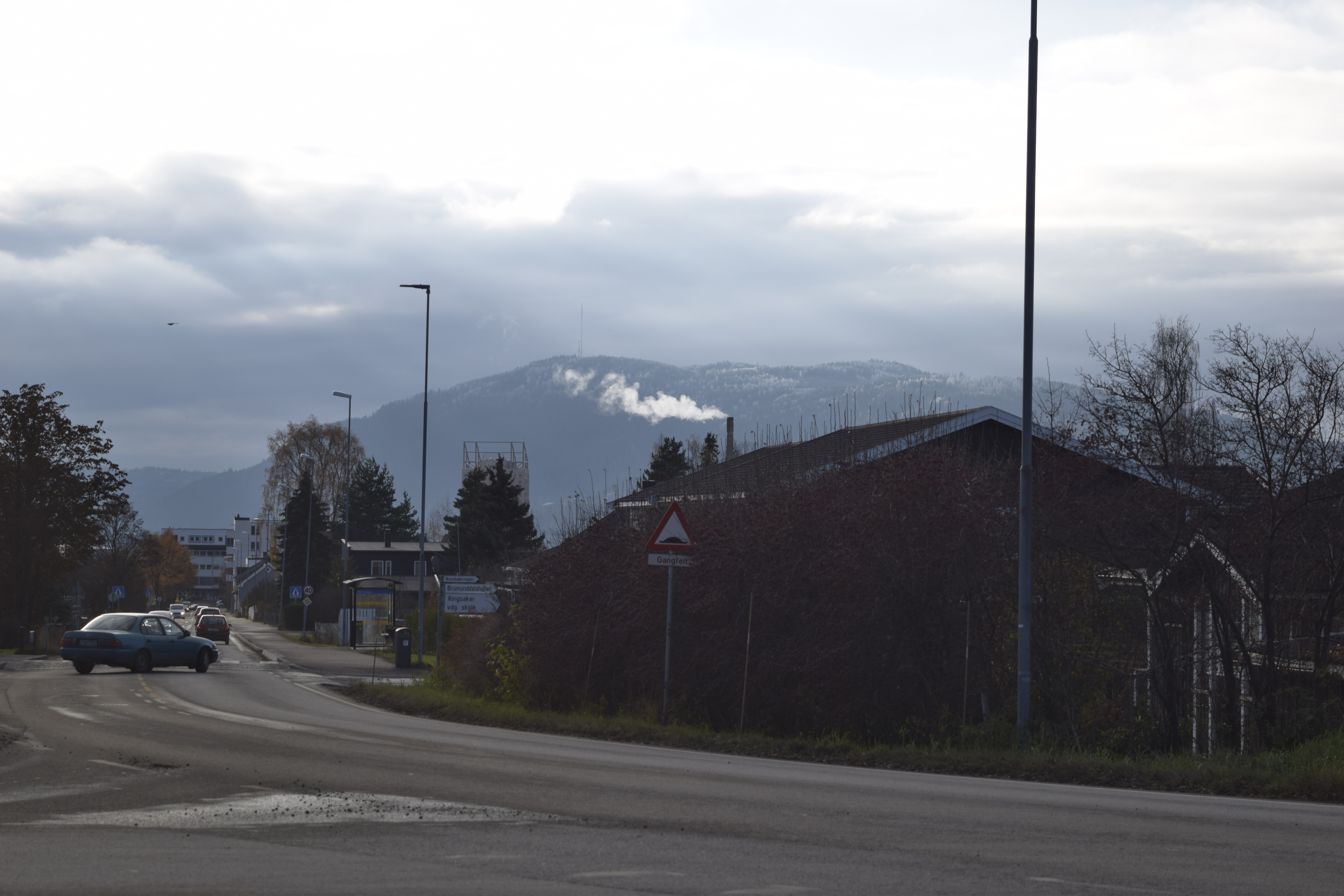
Downtown Brumunddal

The 7.34-square-kilometre (1,810-acre) town has a population (2024) of 11,337 and a population density of 1,545 inhabitants per square kilometre (4,000/sq mi). This makes it the largest settlement in all of Ringsaker Municipality.

The dominant industries are agriculture, ore refining, and tourism. Tine also has a large production facility in the town. Brumunddal is the hometown of the woman behind one of Norway's most popular frozen pizza brands, Grandiosa. The local football team is Brumunddal Fotball.

Mjøstårnet, the world's tallest glulam structure, an 18-storey building, is in Brumunddal.

== Sport ==
The By speedwaybane is a motorcycle speedway venue located north west of the town in a remote area (60°54′08″N 10°54′33″E), off the Lillehaugvegen. The speedway is organised by the Mjøsa Speedwayklubb and it held the final of the Norwegian Individual Speedway Championship in 2017 and 2023.

== See also ==
- List of towns and cities in Norway
