= Å =

Latin letter A with overring

A with Overring
- Å å
- Ǻ ǻ

Usage
- Writing system: Latin script
- Language of origin: Swedish
- Sound values: [aː]; [ɔː]; [oː]; [æ]; [ø]
- In Unicode: U+00C5, U+00E5, U+212B

History
- Development: AO ao, AA aa: Å å
- Variations: Ǻ ǻ

The letter Å (minuscule: å) represents various (although often similar) sounds in several languages. It is a separate letter in Danish, Swedish, Norwegian, Finnish, North Frisian, Low Saxon, Transylvanian Saxon, Walloon, Rotuman, Chamorro, Lule Sami, Pite Sami, Skolt Sami, Southern Sami, Ume Sami, Pamirian languages, and Greenlandic alphabets. Additionally, it is part of the alphabets used for some Alemannic and Austro-Bavarian dialects of German.

Though Å is derived from A by adding an overring, it is typically considered a separate letter. It developed as a form of semi-ligature of an A with a smaller o above it to denote a rounding of the long /a/ in Old Danish.

== Scandinavian languages ==
⟨Å⟩ is part of the Danish and Norwegian alphabet and the Swedish alphabet. In Danish, ⟨å⟩ may represent the phonemes /ɔ/ or /ɒ/, while it may represent [o] and [ɔ] in Norwegian and Swedish.

=== History ===
Historically, Old Norse had a long vowel /aː/ (sometimes spelled ⟨á⟩). Medieval writing often used doubled letters for long vowels, writing the vowel as ⟨aa⟩. From around 1200, the vowel underwent rounding towards [ɔː] to such a degree that it started to show up in the written language by using ⟨o⟩. In manuscripts from 1300 to 1400, a word like blaa ('blue', modern spelling ⟨blå⟩) could also be spelled ⟨blao⟩ or ⟨blo(o)⟩, sometimes with an added line.

In Old Swedish the use of the ligature Æ and of Ø (originally also a variant of the ligature Œ) that represented the sounds [æ] and [ø] respectively were gradually replaced by new letters. Instead of using ligatures, a minuscule (that is, lower-case) E was placed above the letters A and O to create new graphemes, which later evolved into the modern letters Ä and Ö, as the E was simplified into the two dots now referred to as an umlaut. Similarly, a minuscule O was placed on top of an A to create a new letter which was used in place of the digraph Aa. It was first used in print in the Gustav Vasa Bible published in 1541 and replaced Aa in the 16th century.

In an attempt to modernize the orthography, linguists tried to introduce the Å to Danish and Norwegian writing in the 19th century. Most people felt no need for the new letter, as the letter group Aa had already been pronounced like Å for centuries in Denmark and Norway. Aa was usually treated as a single letter, spoken like the present Å when spelling out names or words. Orthography reforms making Å official were carried out in Norway in 1917 and in Denmark in 1948. According to Jørgen Nørby Jensen, senior consultant at Dansk Sprognævn, the cause for the change in Denmark was a combination of anti-German and pro-Nordic sentiment. Danish had been the only language apart from German and Luxembourgish to use capitalized nouns in the last decades, but abolished them at the same time.

In a few names of Danish cities or towns, the old spelling has been retained as an option due to local resistance, e.g. Aalborg and Aabenraa; however, the Danish Language Board recommends that such places be written with Å. Between 1948 and 2010, the city of Aarhus was officially spelled Århus. However, the city has reverted to the Aa spelling starting 2011, in a controversial decision citing internationalization and web compatibility advantages.

Icelandic and Faroese are the only North Germanic languages not to use the å. The Old Norse letter á is retained, but the sound it now expresses is a diphthong, pronounced [au] in Icelandic and [ɔa] in Faroese. The short variation of Faroese á is pronounced [ɔ], though.

=== Use in names ===
In some place names, the old Aa spelling dominates, more often in Denmark than in Norway (where it has been abolished in official use since 1917). Locals of Aalborg and Aabenraa resist the Å, whereas Ålesund is rarely seen with Aa spelling. Official rules allow both forms in the most common cases, but Å is always correct. Å as a word means "small river" in Danish, Swedish, and Norwegian and can be found in place names.

Before 1917, when spelling with the double A was common, some Norwegian place names contained three or four consecutive A letters: for instance Haaa (now Håa, a river) and Blaaaasen (Blååsen, 'the blue ("blå") ridge ("ås")').

In family names, the bearer of the name uses Aa or Å according to their choice, but since family names are inherited they are resistant to change and the traditional Aa style is often kept. For instance, the last name Aagaard is much more common than Ågård. The surname Aa is always spelled with double A, never with the single å. However, given names - which are less commonly inherited - have largely changed to the use of the Å. For instance, in Norway more than 12,000 male citizens spell their name Håkon, while only around 2,500 are named Haakon.

Company names are sometimes spelled with the double A by choice, usually in order to convey an impression of old-fashionedness or traditionality. The double A, representing a single sound, is usually kept in initials e.g. for people whose first, middle, and/or last name begins with the double A. Accordingly, a man named "Hans Aagard Hauge" would spell his initials "H. Aa. H." (not "H. A. H." nor "H. Å. H."), while a woman named Aase Vestergaard would spell her initials "Aa. V." (not "A. V." nor "Å. V.").

=== Alphabetization ===
==== Danish and Norwegian ====
Correct alphabetization in Danish and Norwegian places Å as the last letter in the alphabet, the sequence being Æ, Ø, Å. This is also true for the alternative spelling "Aa". Unless manually corrected, sorting algorithms of programs localized for Danish or Norwegian place e.g., Aaron after Zorro.

In Danish, Aa is sorted as Å if it is pronounced as one syllable; thus, for example, the German city Aachen is listed under Å, as well as the Danish city Aabenraa. If Aa is pronounced as two syllables, it is sorted as regular A's. In the case that the only difference between two words is that one uses Å and the other uses Aa, the one with Å goes first. This is §4.2 in the Danish Retskrivningsreglerne.

==== Swedish ====
In the Swedish and Finnish alphabets, Å is sorted after Z, as the third letter from the end, the sequence being Å, Ä, Ö. A combined Nordic sorting mnemonic is Æ, Ø, Å, Ä, Ö.

=== International transcription ===
Alternative spellings of the Scandinavian Å have become a concern because of globalization, and particularly because of the popularization of the World Wide Web. This is to a large extent due to the fact that prior to the creation of IDNA system around 2005, internet domains containing Scandinavian letters were not recognized by the DNS, and anyway do not feature on keyboards adapted for other languages. While it is recommended to keep the Å intact wherever possible, the next best thing is to use the older, double A spelling (e.g. "www.raade.com" instead of "www.råde.com"). This is because, as previously discussed, the Å/Aa indicates a separate sound. If the Å is represented as a common A without the overring (e.g. "www.rade.com") there is no indication that the A is supposed to represent another sound entirely. Even so, representing the Å as just an A is particularly common in Sweden, as compared to Norway and Denmark, because the spelling Aa has no traditional use there.

== Finnish ==
The fact that Å is a common letter in Swedish while having no native use in Finnish has led to it being used as a concise symbol for the Swedish language in Finland, as in this campaign to rid Finnish schools of Mandatory Swedish. The phrase reads "Away with enforced Swedish".

Because the Finnish alphabet is derived from the Swedish alphabet, Å is carried over, but it has no native Finnish use and is treated as in Swedish. Its usage is limited to loanwords (the Finnish academic dictionary Kielitoimiston sanakirja, about 100,000 words, has only one word containing Å: ångström) and names of Swedish, Danish or Norwegian origin. In Finland there are many Swedish-speaking as well as many Finnish-speaking people with Swedish surnames, and many Swedish surnames include Å. In addition, there are many geographical places in the Finnish coastal areas and archipelago that have å in their Swedish names, such as Kråkö and Långnäs, as well as the Finnish autonomous region of Åland, a group of islands midst between Sweden and Finland where almost all natives speak Swedish. The Finnish name for Å is ruotsalainen oo ("Swedish O"), and is pronounced identically to O, which has the value [o̞]. (Note that in Swedish, the sounds [oː] and [ɔ] may be represented by Å or O, but O also represents [uː] and [ʊ].)

The substitution aa for å is not allowed in Finnish, because aa is already a common letter combination with the value [ɑː].

== Emilian ==
In Emilian, å is used to represent the open-mid back unrounded vowel [ʌ], like the RP pronunciation of ⟨u⟩ in "up", e.g. Modenese dialect åmm, dånna [ˈʌmː], [ˈdʌnːa] "man, woman";

e.g. Bolognese dialect Bulåggna, dåpp [buˈlʌɲːa] [ˈdʌpː] "Bologna, later".

== Walloon ==
The letter å was introduced to some eastern local variants of Walloon at the beginning of the 16th century and initially noted the same sound as in Danish. Its use then spread to all eastern dialects, under the cultural influence of Liege, and covered three sounds, a long open o, a long closed o, or a long a, depending on the local varieties. The use of a single å letter to cover such pronunciations has been embraced by the more recent pan-Walloon orthography (rifondou or Common Walloon), with one orthography for words regardless of the local phonetic variations.

In non-standardized writings outside the Liege area, words containing å are written with au / ô (representing the same sound) or â. For example, the word måjhon (house) in the standardized orthography is spelled môjo(n), mâhon, maujon in dialectal writings (mohone is another form that does not contain a long å).

== Istro-Romanian ==
The Istro-Romanian alphabet is based on the standard Romanian alphabet with several additional letters used to mark sounds specific only to this language, one of them is Åå, that is used for the /ɒ~ɔ/ phoneme in words like fråte [frɒte] "brother".

The pronunciation of this letter varies from [ɒ] to [ɔ] by dialect, nonetheless, it always represents this same phoneme.

== Javanese ==
Javanese (sometimes) uses å to indicate open-mid back rounded vowel ⟨ɔ⟩ together with ó (o acute).

== Chamorro ==
Å and å are also used in the practical orthography of Chamorro, a language indigenous to the people of Northern Mariana Islands and Guam. Unmarked a represents the low front unrounded vowel, while å represents the low back rounded vowel. The Chamorro name for Guam is Guåhån, and its capital is called Hagåtña.

== Greenlandic ==
In Greenlandic, å is not used in native words, but is used in several loanwords from Danish, such as båndoptageri (Danish: båndoptager) 'tape recorder'. Like in Danish, å is sorted last in the alphabet.

== Symbol for angstrom ==
The letter "Å" (U+00C5) is also used as the international symbol for the non-SI unit angstrom, a physical unit of length named after the Swedish physicist Anders Jonas Ångström. It is always uppercase in this context (symbols for units named after people are generally uppercase). The angstrom is equal to 10^{−10} m (one ten-billionth of a meter) or 0.1 nm.

In Unicode, the unit is encoded as U+212B Å ANGSTROM SIGN. However, it is canonically equivalent to the ordinary letter Å. The duplicate encoding at U+212B is due to round-trip mapping compatibility with an East-Asian character encoding, but is otherwise not to be used.

== Unicode ==
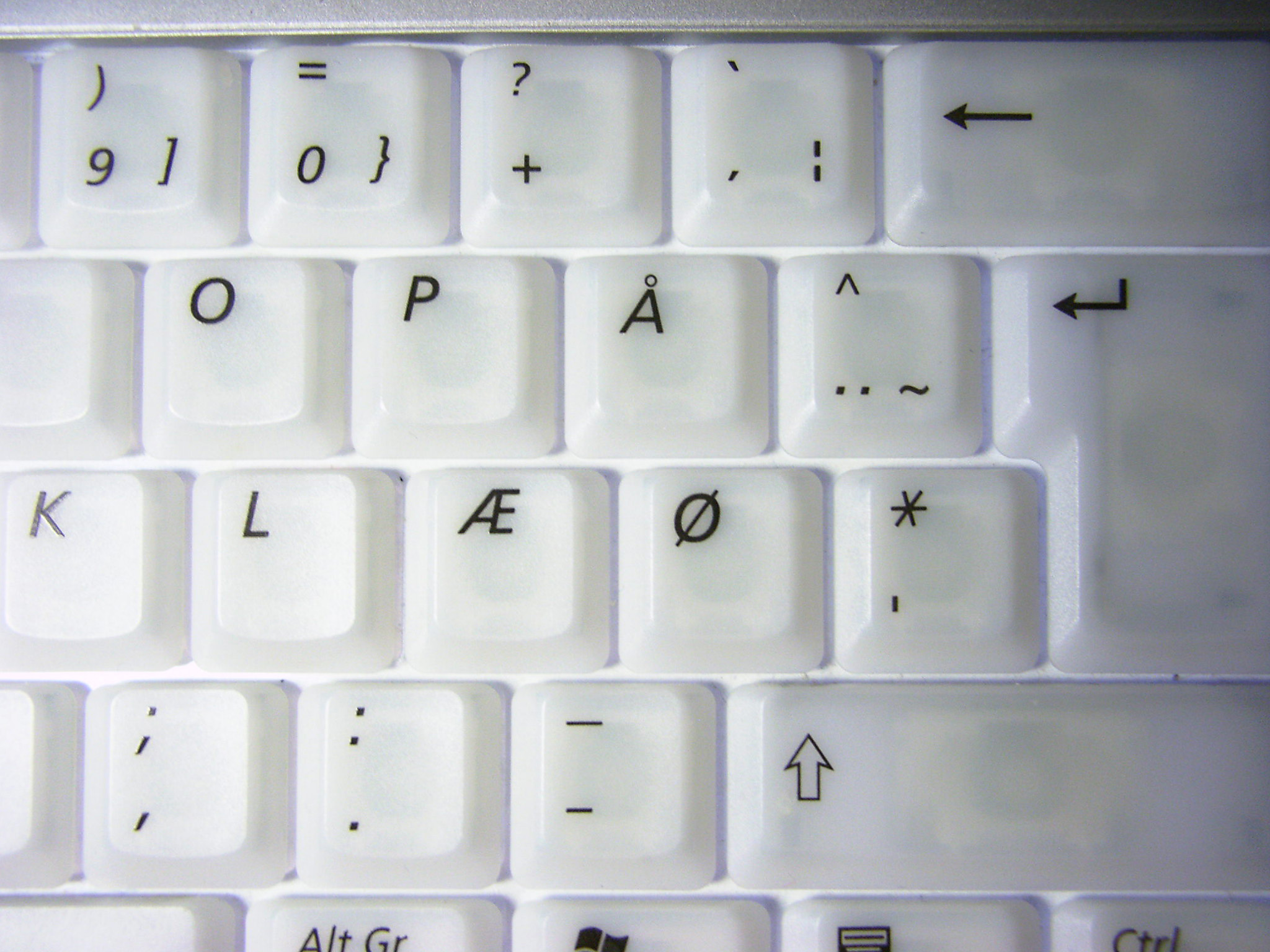
Danish keyboard with keys for Æ, Ø and Å. On Norwegian keyboards the Æ and Ø trade places.

- U+00C5 Å LATIN CAPITAL LETTER A WITH RING ABOVE
- U+00E5 å LATIN SMALL LETTER A WITH RING ABOVE

== Type designs of the capital "Å" ==
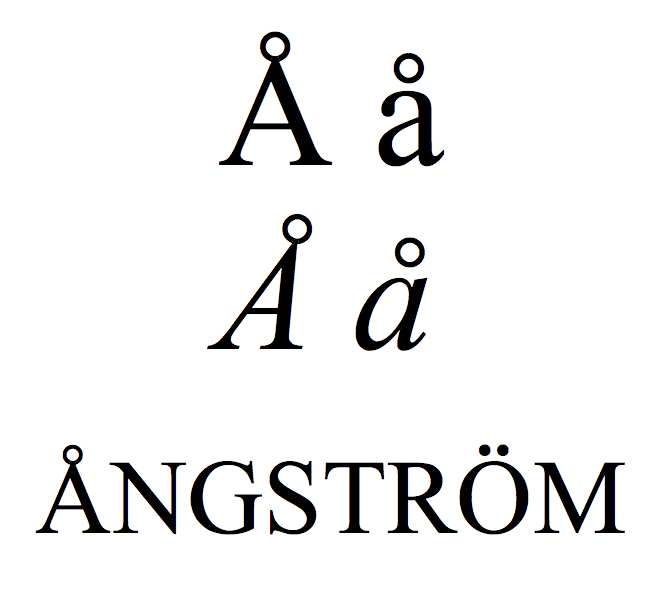
The Å in Times New Roman.

Some type designers like using the "ring stick" state, as they think that that way the glyph will not be very tall. Otherwise prefer the "ring separate" state, for example SIL Fonts. The second state is more common.

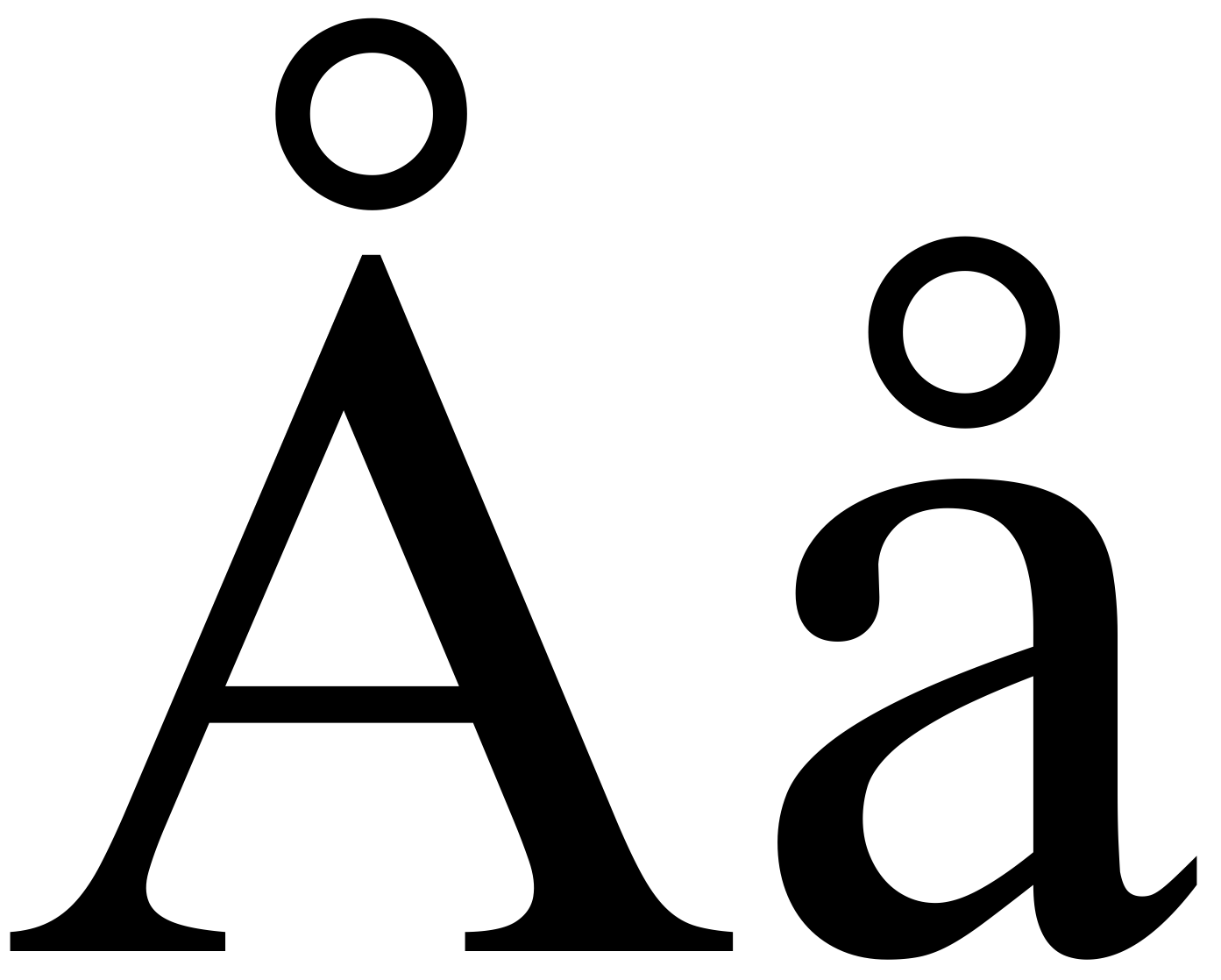
SIL modified the ring position in the A-ring glyph. The ring is separated.

== See also ==
- Æ
- Ä
- Á
- A with ring above (Cyrillic), a letter used in the Selkup language
- Ø
- Ö
- Combining character (A and combining ring above (U+030A), Å å, or o above (U+0366), Aͦ aͦ, resembles Å å)
