= List of shipwrecks in October 1848 =

The list of shipwrecks in October 1848 includes ships sunk, foundered, wrecked, grounded, or otherwise lost during October 1848.

== 1 October ==
List of shipwrecks: 1 October 1848
Ship	State	Description
Ariadne	United Kingdom	The ship was in collision with Anglo-American (United Kingdom) and was beached at Liverpool, Lancashire. She was on a voyage from Liverpool to Hamburg.
Breeze	United Kingdom	The ship ran aground on the Moyen Sand, in the North Sea. She was refloated the next day and taken in to Cuxhaven.
Coronilla	(United Kingdom of Great Britain and Ireland) British North America	The ship was wrecked at Sydney, Nova Scotia. Her crew were rescued.
Hekla	Denmark	The schooner was driven ashore at Redcar, Yorkshire, United Kingdom. She was refloated the next day and taken in to Hartlepool, County Durham, United Kingdom.
Lord Douglas	United Kingdom	The ship was driven ashore 7 nautical miles (13 km) south of Bridlington, Yorkshire. She was on a voyage from Stettin to London.
Lucca	Belgium	The ship was driven ashore at the mouth of the Somme. She was on a voyage from Reval, Russia to Abbeville, Somme, France. She had been refloated by 5 October.
Penang	United Kingdom	The ship was wrecked on South Ronaldsay, Orkney Islands. Her 20 crew were rescued. She was on a voyage from Saint Petersburg, Russia to Liverpool, Lancashire.
Prince Charlie	United Kingdom	The full-rigged ship was abandoned in the Atlantic Ocean with the loss of four lives. Survivors were rescued by the full-rigged ship Oceana (Norway). Prince Charlie was on a voyage from a port in British Honduras to London. She drove ashore on Cumberland Island Georgia before 17 October.
Regent	United Kingdom	The ship was driven ashore at Ottendorf, Duchy of Schleswig. She was refloated and taken in to the Elbe.

== 2 October ==
List of shipwrecks: 2 October 1848
Ship	State	Description
Ann, and Guillame Tell	United Kingdom; France	The ship were in collision and sank in the English Channel 22 nautical miles (41 km) off the Isle of Wight. Their crews were rescued. Ann was on a voyage from Newcastle upon Tyne, Northumberland to Sidmouth, Devon.
Buskar	(United Kingdom of Great Britain and Ireland) British North America	The ship was driven ashore on Fortune Island, Bahamas. She was on a voyage from Halifax, Nova Scotia to Nassau, Bahamas. She was refloated and taken in to Nassau.
Canton	United Kingdom	The ship was wrecked on Tinian Island, in the Mariana Islands with the loss of 20 of her 25 crew. She was on a voyage from Sydney, New South Wales to China.
Catharina	Kingdom of Hanover	The ship was driven ashore near "Nexol", Denmark. Her crew were rescued. She was on a voyage from Königsberg, Prussia to London, United Kingdom.
Gosbee	(United Kingdom of Great Britain and Ireland) British North America	The schooner was driven ashore and wrecked on Devil's Island, Nova Scotia.
J. Marbo	Hamburg	The ship was driven ashore and wrecked on Five Mile Beach, New Jersey, United States. All 122 people on board were rescued. She was on a voyage from Hamburg to New York, United States.
HMS Peterel	Royal Navy	The Alert-class brig ran aground on the German Rock, off Plymouth, Devon. She was refloated.
Superb	United Kingdom	The schooner was wrecked on the Goodwin Sands, Kent. Her crew were rescued. She was on a voyage from Bangor, Caernarfonshire to Whitstable, Kent.

== 3 October ==
List of shipwrecks: 3 October 1848
Ship	State	Description
Boadicea	United Kingdom	The ship was driven ashore on Menorca, Spain. She was on a voyage from Newfoundland, British North America to Livorno, Grand Duchy of Tuscany. She was refloated on 9 October and taken in to Palma de Mallorca, Mallorca, Spain.
Diana	United Kingdom	The ship ran aground on the Newcombe Sand, in the North Sea off the coast of Suffolk. She was on a voyage from Sidmouth, Devon to Hartlepool, County Durham. She was refloated and resumed her voyage.
Duff	United Kingdom	The brig was driven ashore at Portsmouth, Hampshire.
Fitzhenry	United Kingdom	The sloop was in collision with the paddle steamer Scotia (United Kingdom) and sank at Dublin.
La Purissima Concepcion	Spain	The ship was driven ashore 4 nautical miles (7.4 km) south of Bridlington, Yorkshire. Her crew were rescued. She was on a voyage from Drammen, Norway to Bilbao. La Purissima Concepcion was refloated on 8 October.
Logie O' Buchan	United Kingdom	The ship ran aground in the River Wear. She was on a voyage from Sunderland, County Durham to Newburgh, Fife. She was later refloated and taken in to Newburgh, where she arrived on 8 October.
Lowca	United Kingdom	The schooner was driven ashore at St. John's Point, in the Pentland Firth. She was on a voyage from Hull, Yorkshire to Liverpool, Lancashire. She floated off but consequently sank. Her crew were rescued.
Skip Jack	United States	The ship was driven ashore on Plum Island, Massachusetts. She was on a voyage from Nova Scotia, British North America to Boston, Massachusetts.
Victory	United Kingdom	The ship was driven ashore and wrecked on Barry Island, Glamorgan. Her crew were rescued. She was on a voyage from Kinsale, County Cork to Cardiff, Glamorgan.

== 4 October ==
List of shipwrecks: 4 October 1848
Ship	State	Description
Brothers	United Kingdom	The ship was driven ashore at Cape Henry, Virginia, United States. She was on a voyage from Norfolk, Virginia to Waterford.
Charles Hay	United Kingdom	The packet ship was driven ashore and wrecked at Ollaberry, Shetland Islands.
Michigan	United States	The full-rigged ship was abandoned in the Atlantic Ocean with the loss of six lives. Thirteen crew were rescued by the brig Joseph Anderson (United Kingdom). Michigan was on a voyage from Glasgow, Renfrewshire, United Kingdom to New York.

== 5 October ==
List of shipwrecks: 5 October 1848
Ship	State	Description
Brigand	United Kingdom	The ship ran aground in the River Tyne at Jarrow, Northumberland.
Ellida	Sweden	The sloop was wrecked off "Store Bunddrager", Denmark.
Fanny	United Kingdom	The whaler was abandoned in the Atlantic Ocean. Her crew were rescued by Fama Habanera (Spain).
Rapid	Prussia	The ship was wrecked in the Agger Canal. Her crew were rescued. She was on a voyage from Hartlepool, County Durham, United Kingdom to Stettin.

== 6 October ==
List of shipwrecks: 6 October 1848
Ship	State	Description
Cumberland	United Kingdom	The ship was driven ashore on Sanday, Orkney Islands. She was on a voyage from South Shields, County Durham to New York, United States.
Hampden	United Kingdom	The ship was driven ashore near Ringkøbing, Denmark. Her crew were rescued. She was on a voyage from Newport, Monmouthshire to Kronstadt, Russia.
National	Belgium	The ship was driven ashore at "Anstruwerd". She was on a voyage from Antwerp to Rio de Janeiro, Brazil.
Rambler	United Kingdom	The ship was driven ashore on Bornholm, Denmark. She was on a voyage from Blyth, Northumberland to Königsberg, Prussia. She was later refloated and resumed her voyage.
Speculation	United Kingdom	The ship was driven ashore at Harrington, Cumberland. She was refloated.
Vintage	United Kingdom	The ship ran aground at Porto, Portugal. She was on a voyage from Porto to Bristol, Gloucestershire. She was refloated and put back to Porto, where she was condemned.

== 7 October ==
List of shipwrecks: 7 October 1848
Ship	State	Description
Astrea	(United Kingdom of Great Britain and Ireland) Jersey	The ship was lost south of Cuba. Her crew were rescued.
Freak	United Kingdom	The ship ran aground off St. James's Castle, Smyrna, Ottoman Empire. She was refloated and resumed her voyage.
Gene	United Kingdom	The ship was driven ashore on Bornholm, Denmark. She was on a voyage from Hull to Kronstadt, Russia. She was refloated.
Gleaner	United Kingdom	The ship ran aground on the Skagen Reef. She was on a voyage from Sunderland, County Durham to Pillau, Prussia.
Horner	United Kingdom	The ship was driven ashore on Bornholm. She was on a voyage from Sunderland to Kronstadt. She was refloated on 9 October and taken in to Rønne, Denmark for repairs.
Isabella	United Kingdom	The ship was driven ashore and wrecked on Bornholm.
Palmyra	United Kingdom	The ship was wrecked on a reef in the Java Sea. Her crew were rescued. She was on a voyage from Sydney, New South Wales to India.
Puritan	United States	The ship was abandoned in the Atlantic Ocean. Her crew were rescued by E. Z. (United Kingdom). Puritan was on a voyage from New York to Cork, United Kingdom.
Queen of the Tyne	United Kingdom	The ship was driven ashore on Kronstadt. She was on a voyage from Newcastle upon Tyne, Northumberland to Kronstadt. She was refloated.
Robert Taylor	United Kingdom	The ship was driven ashore on Bornholm. She was refloated.
Wave	United Kingdom	The ship was driven ashore on Bornholm. She was on a voyage from Newcastle upon Tyne to Kronstadt. She was refloated.

== 8 October ==
List of shipwrecks: 8 October 1848
Ship	State	Description
Ashton	United Kingdom	The ship foundered in the Irish Sea 4 nautical miles (7.4 km) off Howth, County Dublin. Her crew were rescued. She was on a voyage from Dublin to Chester, Cheshire.
Britannia	United Kingdom	The brig was abandoned in the Atlantic Ocean. Her crew survived. She was on a voyage from Demerara, British Guiana to Liverpool, Lancashire.
Jane Augusta	United Kingdom	The ship was destroyed by fire in Terraful Bay, Cape Verde Islands with the loss of a crew member. She was on a voyage from Hull, Yorkshire to Coquimbo, Chile.

== 9 October ==
List of shipwrecks: 9 October 1848
Ship	State	Description
Commerce	United Kingdom	The ship was driven ashore at Port Talbot, Glamorgan. She was on a voyage from Cardiff to Port Talbot. She was refloated on 11 October and found to be severely damaged.
Jenny	United Kingdom	The ship capsized in the Bute Dock, Cardiff.
Venus	United Kingdom	The ship was driven ashore in the Shetland Islands. She was on a voyage from Lerwick, Shetland Islands to Dublin. She was refloated and put back to Lerwick.

== 10 October ==
List of shipwrecks: 10 October 1848
Ship	State	Description
HMS Childers	Royal Navy	The Cruizer-class brig-sloop ran aground on or near Pratas Island. She was refloated on 26 October and put in to Hong Kong, where she arrived on 28 October in a leaky condition.
Eugene et Zulie	France	The ship ran aground and was wrecked 2 leagues (6 nautical miles (11 km)) from Saint-Valery-sur-Somme, Somme. She was on a voyage from Havre de Grâce, Seine-Inférieure to London, United Kingdom.
Isabella Stewart	United Kingdom	The ship was driven ashore on the south coast of Long Island, New York, United States. All on board were rescued. She was on a voyage from Liverpool, Lancashire to New York City, United States.
Mary Ann	United Kingdom	The ship was driven ashore and wrecked at Kingstown, County Dublin.
Speedwell	United Kingdom	The ship ran aground on a reef north west of Læsø, Denmark. Her crew were rescued. She was on a voyage from Liverpool to Flensburg, Duchy of Schleswig.

== 11 October ==
List of shipwrecks: 11 October 1848
Ship	State	Description
Comte Royer	France	The ship ran aground and capsized in the River Tyne. She was on a voyage from Dunkirk, Nord to Newcastle upon Tyne, Northumberland, United Kingdom. She had been refloated by 15 October and placed under repair.
Despatch	United Kingdom	The sailing barge struck the quayside at Nagden, Faversham, Kent and was beached in Faversham Creek. She was later refloated and taken in to Faversham.
Fanny Connell	United Kingdom	The ship was driven ashore and wrecked in the Baie de Somme. Her crew were rescued. She was on a voyage from Sierra Leone to London.
Four Brothers	United Kingdom	The ship ran aground at South Shields, County Durham. She was on a voyage from Liverpool, Lancashire to South Shields.
James Dowell	United Kingdom	The ship ran aground on the Herd Sand, in the North Sea off the coast of County Durham. She was on a voyage from Nairn to South Shields
Vriendschap	Flag unknown	The ship was driven ashore and wrecked at Scheveningen, South Holland, Netherlands. Her crew were rescued. She was on a voyage from Poole, Dorset, United Kingdom to a Baltic port.

== 12 October ==
List of shipwrecks: 12 October 1848
Ship	State	Description
Amazon	United Kingdom	The ship ran aground in the Mississippi River. She was on a voyage from New Orleans, Louisiana to Liverpool, Lancashire.
Argyra	United Kingdom	The ship ran aground and was wrecked near "Waldo". She was on a voyage from Kronstadt, Russia to Liverpool. She had been refloated by 6 November and taken in to Kalmar, Sweden.
Free Trader	United Kingdom	The ship was abandoned in the Atlantic Ocean. All on board were rescued by Washington Irving (United States). Free Trader was on a voyage from Saint John, New Brunswick, British North America to Cork.
Marshall Packet	United Kingdom	The ship sprang a leak in the North Sea whilst on a voyage from Hartlepool, County Durham to London. She was assisted in to Hull, Yorkshire.
Mary	United Kingdom	The ship ran aground and was damaged at Ipswich, Suffolk. She was refloated.
Orpheus	United Kingdom	The ship was driven ashore at Deal, Kent. She was on a voyage from South Shields, County Durham to Naples, Kingdom of the Two Sicilies. She was refloated and towed in to Ramsgate, Kent.
Prins Oscar	Sweden	The ship ran aground south of "Amack Island", Denmark. She was on a voyage from Stockholm to Australia. She had been refloated by 16 October and taken in to Copenhagen, Denmark for repairs.
Scandia	Sweden	The barque ran aground on the Sunk Sand, in the North Sea off the coast of Essex. She was on a voyage from Umeå to Gibraltar. She was refloated and assisted into Harwich in a waterlogged condition.

== 13 October ==
List of shipwrecks: 13 October 1848
Ship	State	Description
Bringhjem	Norway	The yacht was wrecked on a reef off "Kletmollen", Denmark. Her crew were rescued.
Cato	United Kingdom	The ship sprang a leak in the North Sea off Spurn Point, Yorkshire. She subsequently foundered in the Humber with the loss of two of her seven crew. Survivors were rescued by a fishing smack. Cato was on a voyage from Middlesbrough, Yorkshire to London.
Marie	Sweden	The ship was wrecked on Öland. Her crew were rescued.

== 14 October ==
List of shipwrecks: 14 October 1848
Ship	State	Description
Aquilla	United Kingdom	The ship was driven ashore at Margate, Kent. She was on a voyage from Stockton-on-Tees, County Durham to Margate. She was refloated and taken in to Margate.
Catharina	Netherlands	The ship was wrecked on the Zuideval. She was on a voyage from Waarde, Zeeland to Amsterdam, North Holland.
Columbia	United Kingdom	The ship ran aground and sank on Scroby Sands, Norfolk. Her crew were rescued. She was on a voyage from London to Newcastle upon Tyne, Northumberland.
Hope	United Kingdom	The ship foundered with the loss of all but five of her crew. Survivors were rescued by Framjee Cowajee ( India). Hope was on a voyage from Calcutta, India to Penang, Malaya.
Lady Harvey	United Kingdom	The ship sprang a leak and was beached at Hull, Yorkshire.
Mary	United Kingdom	The ship ran aground and was damaged at South Shields, County Durham. She was on a voyage from South Shields to London. She was refloated and put back to South Shields in a leaky condition.
Norden	(Russian Empire) Grand Duchy of Finland	The schooner was driven ashore on the east coast of Öland, Sweden.
Ophelia White	United Kingdom	The ship was driven ashore on the east coast of Öland. She was on a voyage from Saint Petersburg, Russia to London.
Perseverance	United Kingdom	The ship was wrecked on a reef south east of the Rhone Islands, off Gotland, Sweden. Her crew survived.
Sophia	United Kingdom	The ship sprang a leak and was abandoned in the North Sea off Flamborough Head, Yorkshire. Her crew were rescued by Dapper (United Kingdom). Sophia was on a voyage from Newcastle upon Tyne to London.
St. Pierre	France	The ship departed from Rochefort, Charente-Maritime for Liverpool, Lancashire, United Kingdom. No further trace, presumed foundered with the loss of all hands.

== 15 October ==
List of shipwrecks: 15 October 1848
Ship	State	Description
Ann and Elizabeth	United Kingdom	The brig ran aground on the Scroby Sands, Norfolk. She was on a voyage from an American port to Sunderland, County Durham. She capsized on 16 October and floated off. Her crew were rescued.
Maid of the Mill	(United Kingdom of Great Britain and Ireland) New Zealand	The ship foundered with the loss of all hands. She was on a voyage from "Kacolica" to Taranaki.
Quatre Frères	France	The smack was in collision with a steamship 4 nautical miles (7.4 km) west south west of the Longships Lighthouse with the loss of her captain. She was on a voyage from Brest, Finistère to Swansea, Glamorgan, United Kingdom. She was assisted in to Penzance, Cornwall, United Kingdom by the fishing trawler Gannet (United Kingdom).
Welcome	United Kingdom	The ship was driven ashore at Fleetwood, Lancashire. She was on a voyage from Fleetwood to Newry, County Antrim.

== 16 October ==
List of shipwrecks: 16 October 1848
Ship	State	Description
Oscar den Forste	Norway	The schooner was driven ashore and wrecked at Berwick upon Tweed, Northumberland, United Kingdom. Her six crew were rescued, four of them by the Spittal Lifeboat. She was on a voyage from Gothenburg, Sweden to Berwick upon Tweed.

== 17 October ==
List of shipwrecks: 17 October 1848
Ship	State	Description
Apollo	(United Kingdom of Great Britain and Ireland) Guernsey	The ship was driven into by Neptune ( (United Kingdom of Great Britain and Ireland) Guernsey) and was driven into another vessel and severely damaged at Guernsey.
Cottingham	United Kingdom	The ship ran aground on the Shipwash Sand, in the North Sea off the coast of Essex. She was refloated the next day with the assistance of eight smacks and anchored off Harwich, Essex, where she subsequently sank. Her twelve crew were rescued by the Barking smack Myrtle (United Kingdom). One person was killed whilst rendering assistance. Cottingham was on a voyage from South Shields, County Durham to London.
Litzia	Kingdom of the Two Sicilies	The ship was driven ashore north of Almería, Spain. She was on a voyage from Newcastle upon Tyne, Northumberland, United Kingdom to Naples. She was refloated and taken in to Almería, where she was condemned.
Maria	United Kingdom	The sloop was driven ashore and wrecked at Sunderland, County Durham. Her crew were rescued. She was on a voyage from Portsoy, Aberdeenshire to Sunderland.
Ocean Queen	United Kingdom	The full-rigged ship was abandoned in the Atlantic Ocean. Nine of her 25 crew were rescued by Corinthian, and the remaining sixteen by the brig Lion (both United Kingdom). Ocean Queen was on a voyage from Quebec City, Province of Canada, British North America to Liverpool, Lancashire.
Tahanto	United States	The ship departed from Gibraltar for Zante, United States of the Ionian Islands. No further trace, presumed foundered with the loss of all hands.
Vision	Danzig	The ship was driven ashore at Hel, Prussia. She was on a voyage from Pillau, Prussia to Sunderland, County Durham. She was refloated on 11 November and taken in to Danzig.

== 18 October ==
List of shipwrecks: 18 October 1848
Ship	State	Description
Dawb	United Kingdom	The ship ran aground at "Genagogne", British North America.
Hamburg	United States	The ship sprang a leak and foundered in the Atlantic Ocean. Her crew took to the boats; they were rescued on 20 October by Jane Black (United Kingdom). Hamburg was on a voyage from Newcastle upon Tyne, Northumberland, United Kingdom to Philadelphia, Pennsylvania.
Iris	United Kingdom	The ship was driven ashore and wrecked at Fort George, Guernsey, Channel Islands. She was on a voyage from Weymouth, Dorset to Guernsey.
Lord Glenelg	United Kingdom	The barque was abandoned in the Atlantic Ocean. Her crew were rescued by Ellerslie (United Kingdom). Lord Glenelg was on a voyage from Quebec City, Province of Canada, British North America to Liverpool, Lancashire.
Margaret and Mary	United Kingdom	The ship ran aground on the West Hoyle, in Liverpool Bay. Her crew were rescued by a lifeboat. She was on a voyage from Dumfries to Liverpool.
Mary	United Kingdom	The ship was driven ashore and wrecked on Guernsey.
Parthian	United Kingdom	The ship ran aground off Saquarema, Brazil. She was on a voyage from Liverpool to Rio de Janeiro, Brazil.
Triton	United Kingdom	The ship ran aground off Dragør, Denmark. She was on a voyage from Saint Petersburg, Russia to Topsham, Devon. She was refloated and taken in to Copenhagen, Denmark for repairs.

== 19 October ==
List of shipwrecks: 19 October 1848
Ship	State	Description
Achille	France	The ship was wrecked near Camaret-sur-Mer, Finistère. . She was on a voyage from Luçon, Vendée to Gloucester, United Kingdom.
Anna Charlotte	Norway	The ship was wrecked at Arngast, Kingdom of Hanover. Her crew were rescued.
Aurora	Kingdom of Hanover	The galiot was abandoned in the North Sea. Her three crew were rescued by the schooner Circonstance (France). Aurora was towed in to Grimsby, Lincolnshire, United Kingdom on 23 October.
Caroline	United Kingdom	The ship was driven ashore and severely damaged at Gun Point, Devon. She was on a voyage from London to Neath, Glamorgan. She was refloated the next day.
City of Kingston	(United Kingdom of Great Britain and Ireland) British North America	The steamship ran aground at Lachine, Province of Canada.
Deborah	United Kingdom	The ship was wrecked near Halifax, Nova Scotia, British North America. Her crew were rescued. She was on a voyage from Liverpool, Lancashire to Restigouche, New Brunswick, British North America. She was refloated on 21 November and taken in to Miramichi, New Brunswick.
Downshire	United Kingdom	The ship was driven ashore and abandoned at Abergele, Carnarvonshire. Her crew were rescued. She was on a voyage from Belfast, County Antrim to Liverpool.
Harriet Leithart	(United Kingdom of Great Britain and Ireland) New Zealand	The sailing vessel was wrecked at the mouth of the Whanganui River, New Zealand, by a heavy southeasterly gale. All hands were saved. The same storm was likely responsible for the demise of the Elizabeth Davis (qv).
Parthian	United States	The barque was wrecked at Saquarema Brazil. She was on a voyage from Liverpool, Lancashire, United Kingdom to Rio de Janeiro, Brazil.
Reindeer	United Kingdom	The ship was wrecked on Scharhörn. Her crew were rescued. She was on a voyage from Hartlepool, County Durham to Hamburg.
Return	United Kingdom	The ship was driven ashore at Bridlington, Yorkshire. She was refloated on 25 October and taken in to Bridlington in a severely damaged condition.

== 20 October ==
List of shipwrecks: 20 October 1881
Ship	State	Description
Echo	United Kingdom	The ship struck the quayside and was severely damaged at Bridlington, Yorkshire. She was on a voyage from Folkestone, Kent to South Shields, County Durham.
Fortuna	Prussia	The brigantine was wrecked on Santa Maria Island, off El Fuerte, Mexico. All on board survived.
John and William	Lübeck	The ship sprang a leak and sank off the mouth of the Humber with the loss of all but two of her crew. She was on a voyage from Lübeck to Great Yarmouth, Norfolk, United Kingdom.
Undaunted	United Kingdom	The ship, master Brown was driven ashore on the Rödskär, near Hogland, 95 nautical miles (176 km) west of Kronstadt, Russia. She was on a voyage from Hull, Yorkshire to Saint Petersburg, Russia. She had broken up by 25 October.

== 21 October ==
List of shipwrecks: 21 October 1848
Ship	State	Description
Actif	France	The schooner was driven ashore at Tacumshane, County Wexford, United Kingdom. Her crew were rescued. She was on a voyage from Paimpol, Finistère to Dublin, United Kingdom.
Eliza	United Kingdom	The brig was wrecked on the Gingerbread Grounds, off the Bahamas. Her sixteen crew were rescued. She was on a voyage from Savannah, Georgia to New Orleans, Louisiana, United States.
Indus	United Kingdom	The ship ran aground at Whitby, Yorkshire. She was refloated and put back to Whitby.
Johann Jaboby	Prussia	The ship ran aground off Pillau. She was on a voyage from Pillau to Dublin, United Kingdom. She was refloated and resumed her voyage.
Marie	Denmark	The ship was driven ashore near "Bolo" with the loss of her captain.
Ophelia	Lübeck	The steamship was driven ashore at Travemünde.

== 22 October ==
List of shipwrecks: 22 October 1848
Ship	State	Description
Friends	(United Kingdom of Great Britain and Ireland) British North America	The ship was wrecked at Whitehead, Nova Scotia. Her crew were rescued. She was on a voyage from Liverpool, Nova Scotia to Pictou, Nova Scotia.
Riviere	United Kingdom	The brig was run down and sunk in the River Mersey by Orion (United Kingdom). Her crew were rescued by Orion. Riviere was on a voyage from Hayle, Cornwall to Runcorn, Cheshire.
Star	United Kingdom	The schooner was driven ashore at Birchington, Kent.
St. Nicholas	United Kingdom	The brig was driven ashore at Aberdeen. Her crew were rescued. She was on a voyage from Newcastle upon Tyne, Northumberland to Aberdeen. She was refloated on 25 October and towed in to Aberdeen.
Ulster	United Kingdom	The ship foundered. Her crew were rescued by Amphitrite (United Kingdom). Ulster was on a voyage from Sicily to Belfast, County Antrim.
Velocity	United Kingdom	The paddle steamer was wrecked at Aberdeen. All 20 people on board were rescued. She was on a voyage from Newcastle upon Tyne to Aberdeen.

== 23 October ==
List of shipwrecks: 23 October 1848
Ship	State	Description
Carmelia	United Kingdom	The barque capsized in the Atlantic Ocean (38°40′N 53°30′W) with the loss of ten lives. Twelve survivors were rescued on 29 October by the barque Castries (United Kingdom). Carmelia was on a voyage from Faial Island, Azores to Boston, Massachusetts, United States.
Comet	United Kingdom	The paddle tug was wrecked on Spurn Point, Yorkshire. Her crew were rescued.
Diligence	United Kingdom	The brig was wrecked on the Kentish Knock. Ner crew took to the boat and were rescued by the Kentish Knock Lightship ( Trinity House). Diligence was on a voyage from Portmadoc, Caernarfonshire to Newcastle upon Tyne, Northumberland.
Eclipse	United Kingdom	The ship was abandoned by all bar her captain. She was on a voyage from Cardiff, Glamorgan to Southampton, Hampshire. She was subsequently taken in to Penzance, Cornwall by two pilot cutters.
Harriet Leithart	(United Kingdom of Great Britain and Ireland) New Zealand	The ship was wrecked at the mouth of the Wanganui River. All on board were rescued.
Hope	United Kingdom	The ship ran aground on the Black Middens, in the North Sea off the coast of County Durham. She was refloated and towed in to South Shields, County Durham for repairs.
Queen Victoria	United Kingdom	The brig was driven ashore at Ottendorf, Duchy of Schleswig.
Tamerlane	United Kingdom	The ship was driven ashore near Aberystwyth, Cardiganshire. She was on a voyage from Liverpool, Lancashire to New Orleans, Louisiana, United States. She was refloated on 2 November and taken in to Aberystwyth.

== 24 October ==
List of shipwrecks: 24 October 1848
Ship	State	Description
Camilla	United Kingdom	The ship was sighted in the Øresund whilst on a voyage from Danzig to a British port. No further trace, presumed foundered with the loss of all hands.
Elizabeth White	United Kingdom	The ship was sighted in the Great Belt whilst on a voyage from Heiligenhafen, Duchy of Schleswig to London. No further trace, presumed foundered with the loss of all hands.
Harriet	United Kingdom	The ship ran aground at Kronstadt, Russia. She was on a voyage from Newcastle upon Tyne, Northumberland to Saint Petersburg, Russia.
Medusa	United Kingdom	The ship was abandoned in the Atlantic Ocean. Her crew were rescued by the brig Gipsy (United Kingdom). Medusa was on a voyage from Quebec City, Province of Canada to Belfast, County Antrim.
Netley	United Kingdom	The hoy foundered in the English Channel west of Portland, Dorset with the loss of all seven crew. She was on a voyage from Devonport, Devon to Woolwich, Kent.
Mobile	United Kingdom	The ship was wrecked on Læsø, Denmark. Her crew were rescued. She was on a voyage from Saint Petersburg, Russia to Dundee, Forfarshire.
Waterloo	United Kingdom	The ship was driven ashore near Dimlington, Yorkshire. She was on a voyage from Quebec City, Province of Canada, British North America to Hull, Yorkshire. She was refloated the next day and taken in to the Humber.

== 25 October ==
List of shipwrecks: 25 October 1848
Ship	State	Description
Clara	Sweden	The brig capsized at Gothenburg. She was later righted.
Eagle	United Kingdom	The smack foundered off the Cherrystone, in the Bristol Channel. Her crew survived. She was on a voyage from Porthcawl, Glamorgan to Aberystwyth, Cardiganshire. Eagle was refloated on 13 November and taken in to Swansea, Glamorgan.
Favourite	United Kingdom	The sloop struck the pier and sank at Ramsgate, Kent. Her crew were rescued. She was on a voyage from Padstow, Cornwall to Newcastle upon Tyne, Northumberland.
Hebe	Norway	The ship was driven ashore at Tananger. She was on a voyage from London, United Kingdom to Christiania. She was refloated on 6 November and resumed her voyage.
Jacques	United Kingdom	The brig was wrecked on Heligoland. Her crew were rescued. She was on a voyage from Bordeaux, Gironde to Hamburg.
Louisville	United States	The full-rigged ship was dismasted or wrecked at Key West, Florida.
Lycoming	United States	The brig was dismasted or wrecked at Key West.
Owen Cambridge	United Kingdom	The schooner struck the pier and was severely damaged at Ramsgate. She was on a voyage from Ghent, East Flanders, Belgium to Bridgwater, Somerset.
Packet	United Kingdom	The smack sprang a leak and sank in Loch Fyne with the loss of one of her three crew. She was on a voyage from Furnace, Argyllshire to Glasgow, Renfrewshire.
Sea Nymph	United Kingdom	The brig struck the pier and was damaged at Ramsgate. She was on a voyage from Stockton-on-Tees, County Durham to Ramsgate.
Success	United Kingdom	The sloop was wrecked in the Farne Islands, Northumberland. Her crew were rescued. She was on a voyage from South Sunderland, County Durham to Grangemouth, Stirlingshire. She subsequently floated off and was towed in to Dysart, Aberdeenshire.
William	United Kingdom	The ship was wrecked on the Domesnes Reef, in the Baltic Sea with the loss of all nine crew and six rescuers. She was on a voyage from Riga, Russia to Portrush, County Antrim.

== 26 October ==
List of shipwrecks: 26 October 1848
Ship	State	Description
Anna Maria	Sweden	The galleas was driven ashore north of Gothenburg.
Banff	United Kingdom	The sloop was wrecked on the Robin Rigg Sandbank, in the Solway Firth. Her four crew were rescued by the steamship Royal Sovereign (United Kingdom). Banff was on a voyage from Bangor, Caernarfonshire to Alnmouth, Northumberland.
Bonaparte	Sweden	The schooner was driven ashore on Lindholmen, off Gothenburg.
Brothers	United Kingdom	The brig was wrecked on Kråkö, Grand Duchy of Finland with the loss of all hands.
Carl	Russia	The ship was wrecked on the Thistle Rocks, in the Kattegat, with the loss of all but two of her crew. She was on a voyage from Havana, Cuba to Saint Petersburg.
Eagle	United Kingdom	The ship ran aground and sank at the Mumbles, Glamorgan. Her crew were rescued. She was on a voyage from Porthcawl, Glamorgan to Aberdovey, Cardiganshire. She was refloated on 13 November and taken in to Swansea, Glamorgan.
Emily Farnham	United States	The full-rigged ship was driven ashore at Gothenburg. She was refloated.
Mary and Catherine	United Kingdom	The schooner ran aground on Scroby Sands, Norfolk. She was on a voyage from Rostock to London. She was refloated and taken in to Great Yarmouth, Norfolk.
Mary Elizabeth	(United Kingdom of Great Britain and Ireland) British North America	The ship was wrecked on Prince Edward Island.
Manligheten	Sweden	The yacht capsized off "Ovellebakken".
Noah	United Kingdom	The brig was wrecked at "Cansoe". Her crew were rescued. She was on a voyage from Stettin to Hull, Yorkshire.
Neerlands Nyverheid	Netherlands	The ship, master L. Deijer, was driven ashore on Jurmos islands 2,5 M from Utö, Grand Duchy of Finland. With help of a steamship she was towed to Turku. She was on a voyage from Amsterdam, North Holland to Saint Petersburg.
Ruby	United Kingdom	The brig was wrecked at "Wayo". Her crew were rescued.
Scotsman	United Kingdom	The brig was driven ashore on Vargö, Sweden with the loss of all hands. She was on a voyage from Sheerness, Kent to Riga, Russia. She was refloated on 4 November and towed in to Gothenburg, Sweden.
Subraon	(United Kingdom of Great Britain and Ireland) New Zealand	The barque hit a reef near Gibraltar Rock at the entrance to Wellington Harbour, New Zealand, while en route from Wellington to Sydney. All crew and passengers were saved.
Undine	United Kingdom	The full-rigged ship was driven ashore at Gothenburg. She was refloated.
Union Grove	United Kingdom	The brig was lost at Saltholm, Denmark. Her crew were rescued.
William	United Kingdom	The ship was driven ashore and wrecked on Læsø, Denmark with the loss of all fifteen crew and six rescuers. She was on a voyage from Saint Petersburg to London.

== 27 October ==
List of shipwrecks: 27 October 1848
Ship	State	Description
Bella Marina	(United Kingdom of Great Britain and Ireland) British North America	The ship was wrecked on Cape Sable Island, Nova Scotia. Her crew were rescued. She was on a voyage from Havana, Cuba to Saint John's, Newfoundland.
Britannia	United Kingdom	The ship was wrecked at Belmonte, Brazil with the loss of a crew member. She was on a voyage from Rio de Janeiro to Bahia.
Conte Ruger	France	The ship was driven ashore at "Huddlethorpe", Lincolnshire, United Kingdom. Her crew were rescued. She was on a voyage from Newcastle upon Tyne, Northumberland, United Kingdom to Toulon, Var.
Diana	Kingdom of Hanover	The ship was driven ashore wrecked near Newburgh, Fife, United Kingdom with the loss of two of her crew. She was on a voyage from Königsberg, Prussia to Aberdeen, United Kingdom.
Governor Phillip	(United Kingdom of Great Britain and Ireland) New South Wales	The brig was wrecked on a reef off Gull Island, Van Diemen's Land with the loss of sixteen of the 85 people on board. She was on a voyage from Sydney to Hobart, Van Diemen's Land.
Henrietta	United Kingdom	The ship was driven ashore at "Huddlethorpe". Her crew were rescued. She was on a voyage from Great Yarmouth, Norfolk to Leeds, Yorkshire.
Henry Holmes	United Kingdom	The smack was driven ashore and wrecked at Beaumaris, Anglesey.
Jose Francisco	Spain	The ship was wrecked off Amrum, Duchy of Holstein. She was on a voyage from Matanzas, Cuba to Hamburg.
Louis and Elizabeth	France	The ship was driven ashore and broke her back at Anderby, Lincolnshire. Her crew were rescued. She was on a voyage from Newcastle upon Tyne to Toulon.
Sweet Home	United Kingdom	The ship was driven ashore and wrecked at Narva, Russia. Her crew were rescued.

== 28 October ==
List of shipwrecks: 28 October 1848
Ship	State	Description
Chase	United Kingdom	The schooner was abandoned in the Atlantic Ocean. She was on a voyage from Genoa, Kingdom of Sardinia to New Ross, county Wexford.
Dove	United Kingdom	The ship ran aground on the Goodwin Sands, Kent and was abandoned by her crew, who were rescued. She was on a voyage from Dénia, Spain to London.
Eugene	France	The ship was driven ashore in the Loughor Estuary. Her crew were rescued. She was on a voyage from Nantes, Loire-Inférieure to Cardiff, Glamorgan, United Kingdom.
Favourite	United Kingdom	The ship was driven ashore at Saint Petersburg, Russia. She was on a voyage from London to Saint Petersburg.
Industry	United Kingdom	The ship was driven ashore and wrecked on the north coast of Prince Edward Island, British North America. She was on a voyage from Hayle, Cornwall to Miramichi, New Brunswick, British North America.
Ireland	United Kingdom	The ship was driven ashore on the coast of the Grand Duchy of Finland. She was on a voyage from Saint Petersburg to Liverpool, Lancashire. She had broken up by 30 November.

== 29 October ==
List of shipwrecks: 29 October 1848
Ship	State	Description
Garnett	United Kingdom	The ship was driven ashore at Maassluis, South Holland, Netherlands. She was refloated.
Jonge Marie	Danzig	The ship struck a sunken wreck and was damaged. She put in to Egersund, Norway in a sinking condition.
Neptune	United Kingdom	The ship was driven ashore at Praia da Fortaleza de São Joao, Brazil. She was on a voyage from Rio de Janeiro to Bahia.
Three Sisters	(United Kingdom of Great Britain and Ireland) Isle of Man	The smack sprang a leak and was beached at the Point of Ayre, where she was wrecked. Her crew were rescued. She was on a voyage from Whitehaven, Cumberland to Castletown.

== 30 October ==
List of shipwrecks: 30 October 1848
Ship	State	Description
Augustine	France	The ship struck the Gron Rock, near "Means" and sank. She was refloated on 5 November and taken in to "Means".
Conservative	(United Kingdom of Great Britain and Ireland) British North America	The schooner was driven ashore near LaHave, Nova Scotia.
Flora	United Kingdom	The brig struck the Havre de Grind Rocks, in the Atlantic Ocean 25 nautical miles (46 km) north east of Lerwick, Shetland Islands. She floated off and was driven ashore on Fair Isle. Her six crew were rescued. She was on a voyage from Arkhangelsk, Russia to London.
Jessie	United Kingdom	The ship was driven ashore and damaged on Dagö, Sweden. She was on a voyage from Málaga, Spain to Saint Petersburg, Russia. She was refloated on 4 November.
Jeune Adolphe	France	The ship ran aground on the Bull, in the Irish Sea off the coast of County Waterford, United Kingdom and was abandoned by her crew. She was on a voyage from "Bonanse" to Waterford. She was refloated on 4 November.
Superior	United Kingdom	The ship was driven ashore at Castle Point, Ottoman Empire. She was on a voyage from Smyrna, Ottoman Empire to an English port. She was refloated on 4 November and resumed her voyage.

== 31 October ==
List of shipwrecks: 31 October 1848
Ship	State	Description
Daisy	United Kingdom	The steamship collided with the steam tug Welch (United Kingdom) and sank in the River Tyne with the loss of her captain. Her surviving crew and passengers were rescued. Daisy was on a voyage from Newcastle upon Tyne, Northumberland to South Shields, County Durham. She was refloated on 9 November and beached at Whitehill Point, County Durham.
Fredrich der Grosse	Danzig	The ship ran aground on the Dragoe Reef, in the Baltic Sea. She was on a voyage from Helsingør, Denmark to Stettin. She was refloated on 4 November and resumed her voyage.
Johanna Catharina	Sweden	The ship was lost off the Wingo Beacon with the loss of all but one of her crew. She was on a voyage from Aberdeen, United Kingdom to Gothenburg.
Neptune	United Kingdom	The ship ran aground on an anchor and sank in the River Usk.
Thèrèse	Belgium	The ship was wrecked on Belle Île, Morbihan, France. Her crew were rescued.
Three Sisters	United Kingdom	The ship was attacked by six Moorish carrobas off Cape Three Forks, Morocco and was abandoned by her crew, who were subsequently rescued by Dawn (United Kingdom). Three Sisters was on a voyage from Gibraltar to Malta. She was subsequently recaptured by HMS Polyphemus (Royal Navy) and towed back to Gibraltar.

== Unknown date ==
List of shipwrecks: Unknown date in October 1848
Ship	State	Description
Ann	United Kingdom	The ship was in collision with another vessel and foundered in the Grand Banks of Newfoundland. Her crew were rescued by Abigail (United Kingdom).
Archimede	Kingdom of the Two Sicilies	The ship was wrecked on the Corall del Cuba, near Cádiz, Spain on or about 26 October. She was on a voyage from Licata to Falmouth, Cornwall, United Kingdom.
Arietis	United States	The ship was abandoned in the Atlantic Ocean before 1 November.
Bertha	United Kingdom	The ship abandoned in the North Sea before 16 October. She was on a voyage from London to Rostock. She was taken in to Great Yarmouth, Norfolk in a derelict condition.
Clorine	France	The ship was lost in the Mediterranean Sea before 11 April.
Cushla Machree	United Kingdom	The ship was abandoned in the Atlantic Ocean before 16 October.
Diligence	United Kingdom	The brig was wrecked on the Kentish Knock. Her crew were rescued by HMRC Scout ( Board of Customs).
Ekenas	Russia	The ship was holed by ice and sank at Kronstadt before 26 October. She was on a voyage from Saint Petersburg to London.
Eleanor	United Kingdom	The ship was wrecked on the Gunfleet Sand, in the North Sea off the coast of Essex. Her crew were rescued.
Elizabeth Davis	(United Kingdom of Great Britain and Ireland) New Zealand	The schooner left Auckland on 19 October, carrying mail for Wellington. She was never seen again. She probably foundered during the same storm which was responsible for the demise of the Harriet Leithart (qv).
Exmouth	United Kingdom	The ship was wrecked at the Sand Heads, India before 17 October with some loss of life.
Gazelle	United Kingdom	The brig was driven ashore derelict at Bracadale, Isle of Skye, Outer Hebrides.
Goodridge	United Kingdom	The ship was driven ashore at Bridlington, Yorkshire. She was refloated on 25 October and taken in to Bridlington in a severely damaged condition.
Habanera	Spain	The ship was drivin ashore in the Biminis. She was on a voyage from Bordeaux, Gironde, France to Havana, Cuba. She was refloated and taken in to Nassau, Bahamas, where she arrived on 4 October.
Helena	United States	The ship was driven ashore in the Paracel Islands. She was refloated and put in to Singapore.
Highflyer	United Kingdom	The ship was driven ashore at "Corocolly", India before 20 October. Her crew were rescued. She was on a voyage from Calcutta to Madras.
Hoppet	Sweden	The ship was wrecked at "Rozos" before 28 October. She was on a voyage from Amsterdam, North Holland to Helsinki, Grand Duchy of Finland.
Ida Margaretha	Norway	The ship ran aground off Lindesnes before 28 October. She was refloated and was beached at Korshavn.
Indian Queen	(United Kingdom of Great Britain and Ireland) British North America	The ship was driven ashore in a capsized condition in Mal Bay. She was on a voyage from Halifax, Nova Scotia to Montreal, Province of Canada.
Ireland	United Kingdom	The ship was driven ashore and wrecked on the coast of Finland. Her crew survived
Jane	United Kingdom	The ship was run down and sunk in the North Sea off the coast of Essex by the brig Dolphin (United Kingdom). Her crew were rescued by Dolphin.
Juno	Norway	The brig ran aground on the Krekar's Reef. She was refloated and taken in to Key West, Florida, United States before 23 October for repairs.
Kelpie	United States	The ship departed from Hong Kong for Shanghai, China. No further trace, presumed foundered with the loss of all on board.
Martha	United Kingdom	The ship was abandoned in the Atlantic Ocean before 26 October. Her crew were rescued by Caledonia (United Kingdom). Martha was on a voyage from New Orleans, Louisiana, United States to Liverpool.
Mary	United Kingdom	The ship caught fire and was scuttled at the Cape of Good Hope, Cape Colony between 1 and 4 October.
Mena	United Kingdom	The ship caught fire and was scuttled at the Cape of Good Hope, Cape Colony before 4 October.
Neptune	United Kingdom	The ship was abandoned in the Atlantic Ocean. Her crew took to the boat, and were rescued 12 days later by Sophia (United Kingdom). Neptune was on a voyage from London to Quebec City, Province of Canada, British North America.
Rowena	Flag unknown	The ship was wrecked on Boa Vista, Cape Verde Islands. Her crew were rescued.
Sil	Spain	The brig was wrecked at Manila, Spanish East Indies.
Sirius	France	The steamship capsized near Saint-Andéol-le-Château, Rhône in late October.
Subraeon	(United Kingdom of Great Britain and Ireland) New Zealand	The ship was wrecked at Wellington before 28 October. All on board survived.
Trial	United Kingdom	The trow was abandoned in the Bristol Channel before 19 October. She was on a voyage from Newport, Monmouthshire to Bristol, Gloucestershire. She was towed in to Woodspring Pill, Somerset.
William Fell	United Kingdom	The schooner was abandoned in the Atlantic Ocean before 15 October. Her crew were rescued by the brig Passagier (France). William Fell was on a voyage from Quebec City to Whitehaven, Cumberland.
