= Agardh =

Agardh is a surname. Notable people with the surname include:

- Carl Adolph Agardh (1785–1859), Swedish botanist and bishop
- Ingela Agardh (1948–2008), Swedish journalist and television presenter
- Jacob Georg Agardh (1813–1901), Swedish botanist, phycologist, and taxonomist, son of Carl

== See also ==
- Agard
