= Agard =

Agard is a surname that may have several origins. Its variants are Ågård/Aagaard and Aagard. Notable people with the surname include:

- Allman Agard (1907–1981), Trinidadian cricket player
- Brenda Agard (1961–2012), British artist
- David Agard (fl. 1975–2021), American biochemist
- Emily Agard (fl. 2018–2021), Canadian scientific scholar
- Erik Agard (fl. 2018–present), American crossword puzzler
- Ernesto Agard (born 1937), Panamanian basketball player
- John Agard (born 1949), playwright, poet and children's writer from Guyana
- Laura Agard (born 1989), French football player
- Melissa Agard (born 1969), American politician
- Kieran Agard (born 1989), English football player
- Nadema Agard (born 1948), American artist
- Sandra Agard (fl. 2019–2022), British storyteller and writer
- Terrence Agard (born 1990), Dutch sprinter
- Roger Bonair-Agard (fl. 1987–2021), Trinidadian-American poet

== See also ==
- AGARD, NATO's Advisory Group for Aeronautical Research and Development, now renamed NATO Research and Technology Organisation
- Agárd, a small village in Hungary
- Arthur Agarde, a British antiquary
