= Aagaard =

Aagaard or Ågård is a surname. Notable people with the surname include:

- Carl Frederik Aagaard (1833–1895), Danish landscape painter
- Charlotte Aagaard (born 1977), Danish tennis player
- Christen Aagaard (1616–1664), Danish poet
- Christian Aagaard (1937–2022), Danish politician
- Gudrun Stig Aagaard (1895–1986), Danish textile artist
- Jacob Aagaard (born 1973), Scottish chess grandmaster
- Jane Aagaard (born 1956), Australian politician
- Johannes Aagaard (1928–2007), Danish theologian and evangelist
- Julie Aagaard (born 1992), Danish handball player
- Just Michael Aagaard (1757–1819), Danish merchant
- Kari Aagaard, Norwegian handball player
- Lars Aagaard (born 1967) Danish politician
- Martin Aagaard (1863–1913), Norwegian painter
- Mikkel Aagaard (born 1995), Danish ice hockey player
- Mikkel Holm Aagaard (born 1979), Danish handball player
- Niels Aagaard (1612–1657), Danish scholar
- Robert Aagaard (1932–2001), English youth movement founder
- Rolf M. Aagaard (born 1945), Norwegian photographer
- Thorvald Aagaard (1877–1937), Danish composer and organist
- Torstein Aagaard-Nilsen (born 1964), Norwegian composer
- Gunnar Aagaard Andersen (1919–1982), Danish artist
- Andreas Aagaard Kiønig (1771–1856), Norwegian judge
- Ole Rømer Aagaard Sandberg (1888–1975), Norwegian military officer
- Ole Rømer Aagaard Sandberg (1900–1985), Norwegian politician
- Bjarne Aagaard Strøm (1920–2008), Norwegian newspaper editor

== See also ==
- Aagard
