= Ole Rømer Aagaard Sandberg (1888–1975) =

Ole Rømer Aagaard Sandberg (21 June 1888 – 4 January 1975) was a Norwegian military officer and farmer.

He was born in Kristiania as a son of Colonel Christian Juell Sandberg (1858–1944) and Inga Giertsen (1861–1936). He was a paternal grandson of Ole Rømer Sandberg, and thus a great-grandson of priest Christian Juell Sandberg, great-grandnephew of Ole Rømer Aagaard Sandberg (1811–1883), nephew of Ole Rømer Aagaard Sandberg (1865–1925) and first cousin of Ole Rømer Aagaard Sandberg (1900–1985).

He finished his secondary education in 1906 and graduated from the Norwegian Military Academy in 1909 and the Norwegian Military College in 1911. From 1916 to 1918 he was an inspector at the Military Academy. He reached the rank of Rittmester (of the cavalry) in 1919 and Major in 1934. He settled at Storhamar farm where he bred cattle, and also owned the farm Freberg in Furnes. He was known locally as "the Major at Storhamar".

He had high business positions as deputy chair of Vinmonopolet from 1930 to 1932 and chair of Hamar Slagteri, Hedemarken Potetmelfabrikk and the Association for Norwegian Red-and-White Breeding. He chaired the supervisory council of Ganger Rolf and Jelølinjen. He died on January 4, 1975.
