= Furnes Church =

Church in Innlandet, Norway

- Furnes kirke
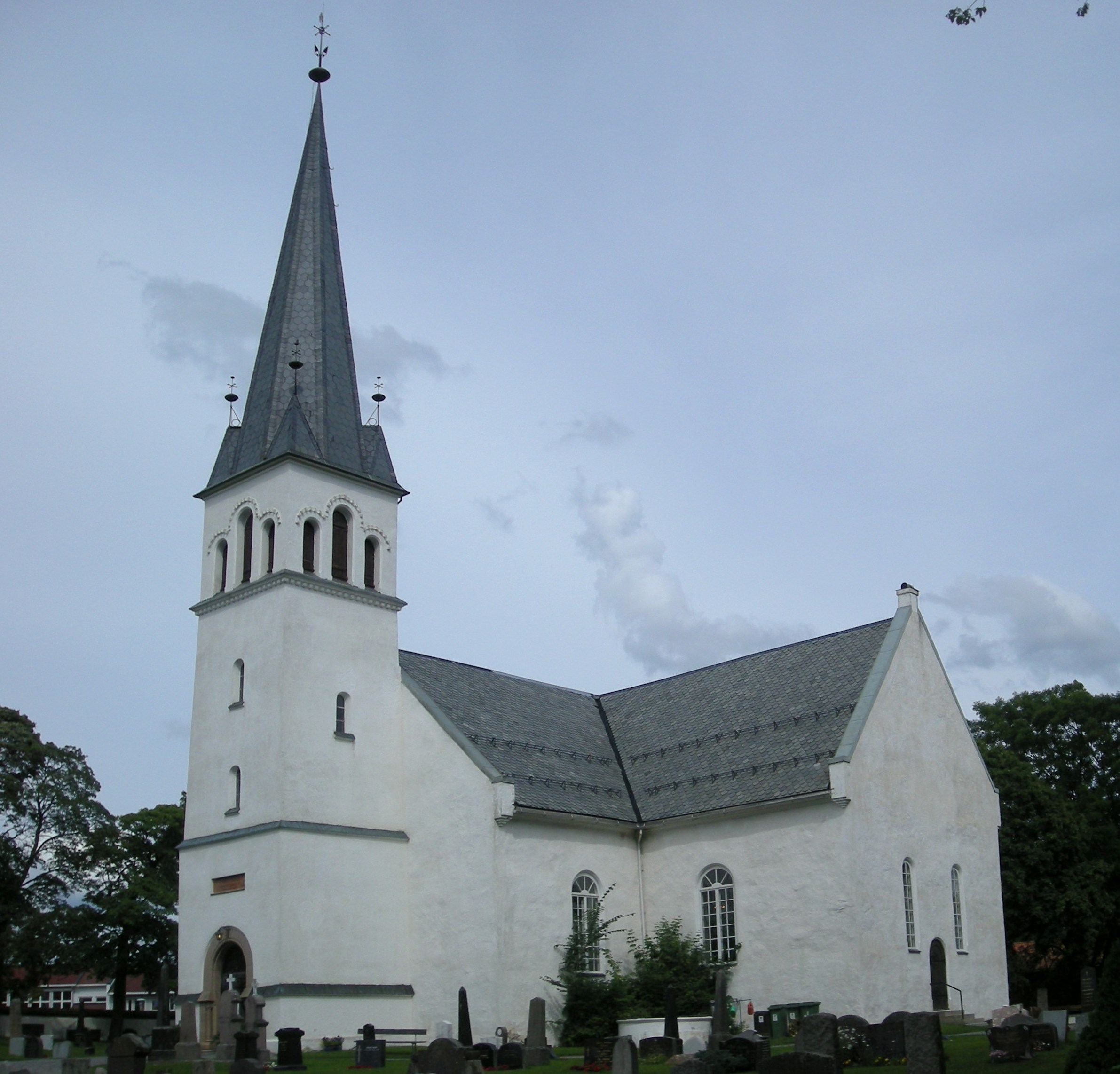
- View of the church
- Furnes Church
- 60°50′28″N 11°01′18″E
- Location: Ringsaker Municipality, Innlandet
- Country: Norway
- Denomination: Church of Norway
- Previous denomination: Catholic Church
- Churchmanship: Evangelical Lutheran

History
- Status: Parish church
- Founded: 14th century
- Consecrated: 12 July 1708

Architecture
- Functional status: Active
- Architect: Hans Nielsen
- Architectural type: Cruciform
- Completed: 1708 (318 years ago)

Specifications
- Capacity: 390
- Materials: Stone

Administration
- Diocese: Hamar bispedømme
- Deanery: Ringsaker prosti
- Parish: Furnes
- Norwegian Cultural Heritage Site
- Type: Church
- Status: Automatically protected
- ID: 84212

Furnes Church (Norwegian: Furnes kirke) is a parish church of the Church of Norway in Ringsaker Municipality in Innlandet county, Norway. It is located in the village of Furnes. It is the church for the Furnes parish which is part of the Ringsaker prosti (deanery) in the Diocese of Hamar. The white, stone church was built in a cruciform design in 1708 using plans drawn up by the architect Hans Nielsen. The church seats about 390 people.

== History ==
The earliest existing historical records of the church date back to the 1570s, but the church was not built at that time. The first church was a wooden stave church that was likely built during the 14th century. This church was probably located at Deglum, about 250 metres (820 ft) east of the present church site. Records show that the old church was repaired a number of times over the centuries.

In 1700, however, the parish decided to replace the church with a new building on a new site. The new church would be built on a site about 250 metres (820 ft) west of the old church site because the old site was too wet and the new site was drier and therefore a better building location. The parish decided to build a stone cruciform building. The mason Hans Nielsen from Christiania was hired to build the new church, using the Oslo Cathedral (built in 1697) as a model. Stone from the Old Hamar Cathedral was used in the construction of this new church. Construction took place from 1702 to 1707 (there was a break of two years during the construction). The new church was consecrated on 12 July 1708 by Bishop Hans Munch. Some furniture was transferred from the old church into the new church. The old church was demolished after the new one was completed.

Originally, the church had a tower over the centre of the nave. In 1811–1812, the tower was rebuilt and made larger. In 1876–1877, the church underwent a large renovation led by the architect Paul Due, which significantly changed the character of the building. The old tower was removed and a new church porch with a large tower was built on the west end of the nave. Inside the church, the flat ceiling was removed and a high, vaulted ceiling was used. There were new benches installed in the nave. The interior was painted with new colors. In 1957–1958, the church interior was renovated again by Finn Krafft and Bjarne Hvoslef. The vaulted ceiling was closed in with a new flat ceiling. The choir was enlarged and the second floor seating galleries were removed.

== Media gallery ==
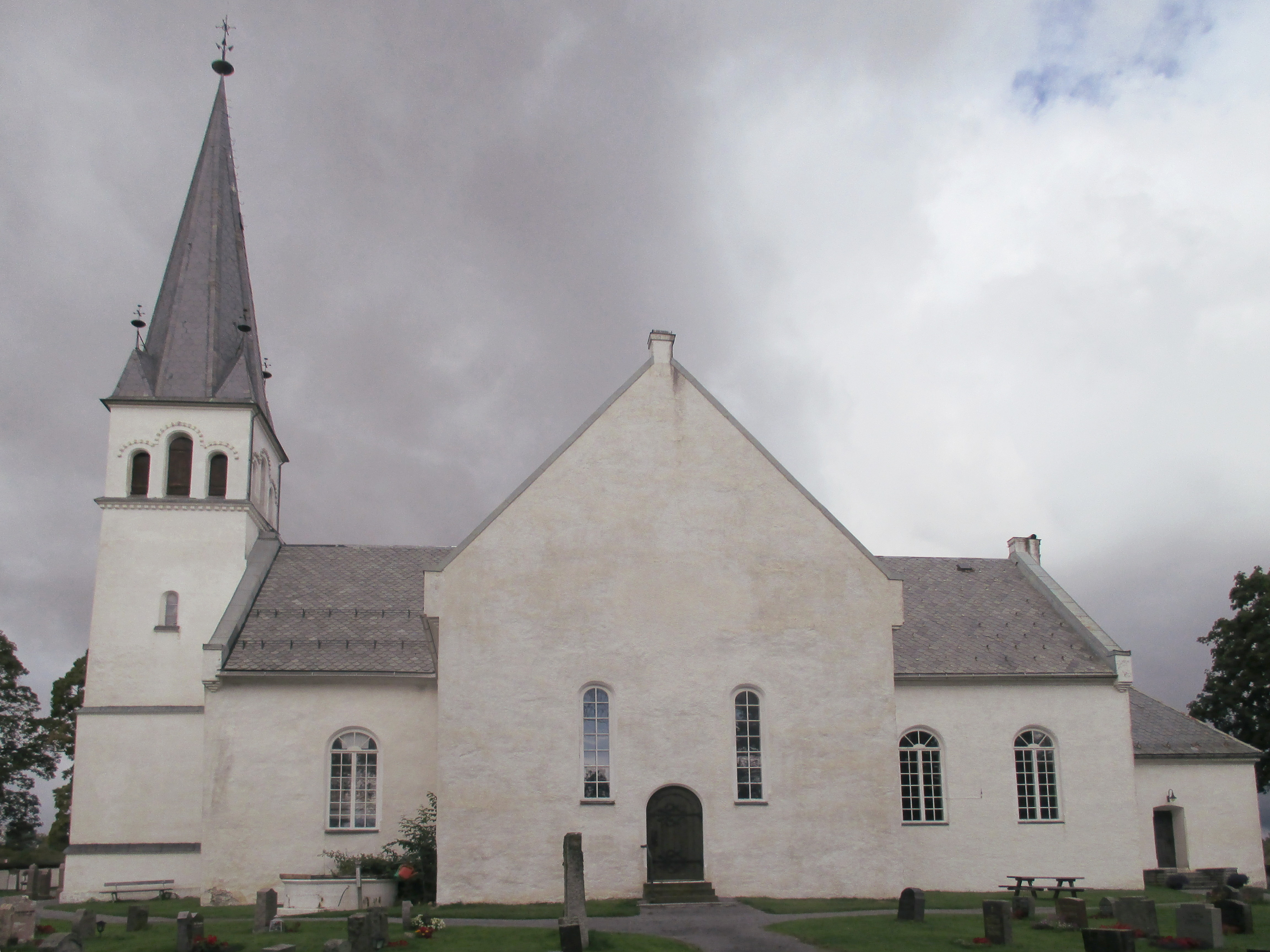

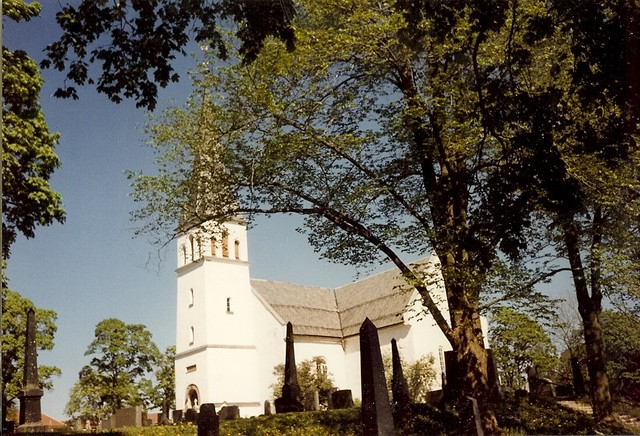

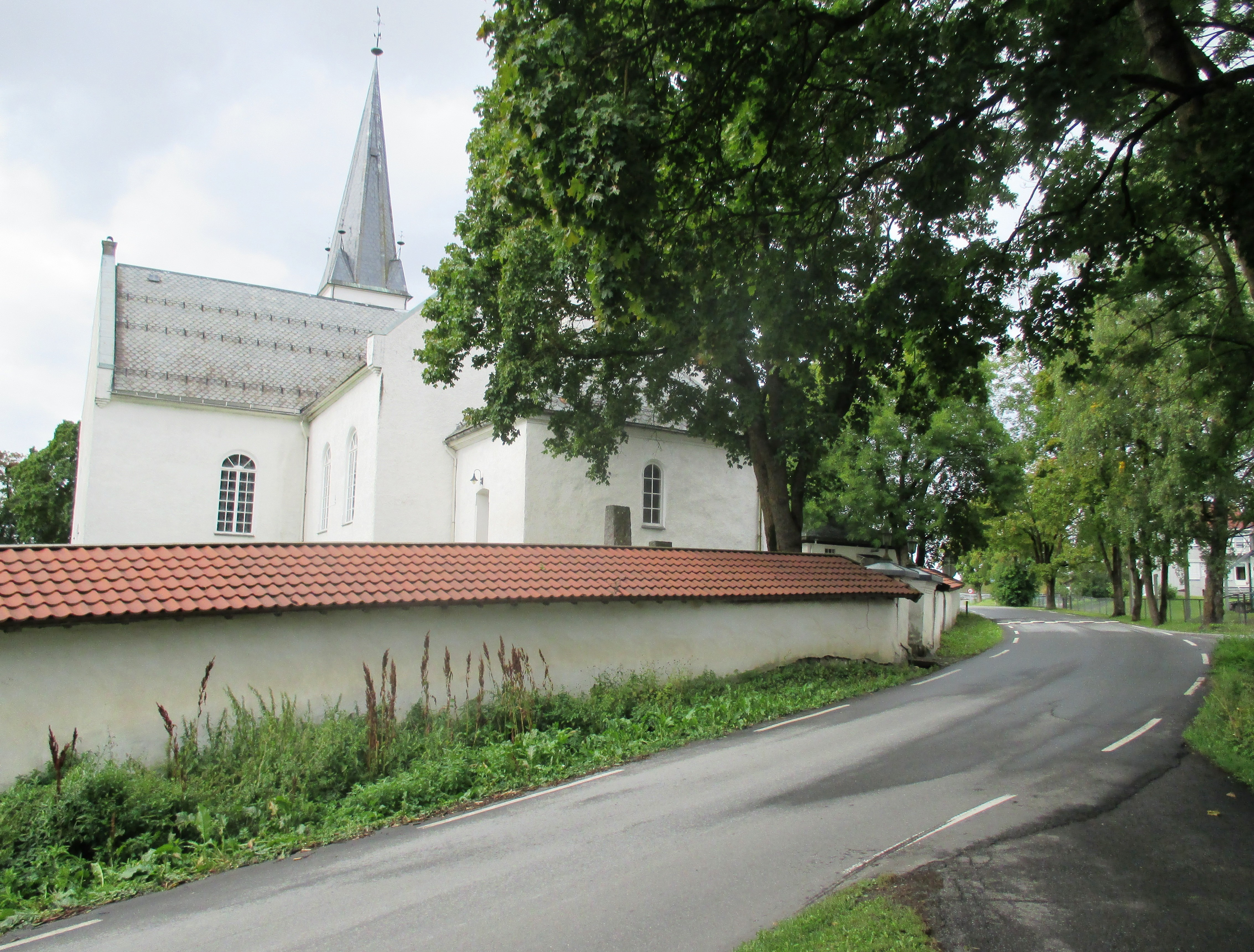

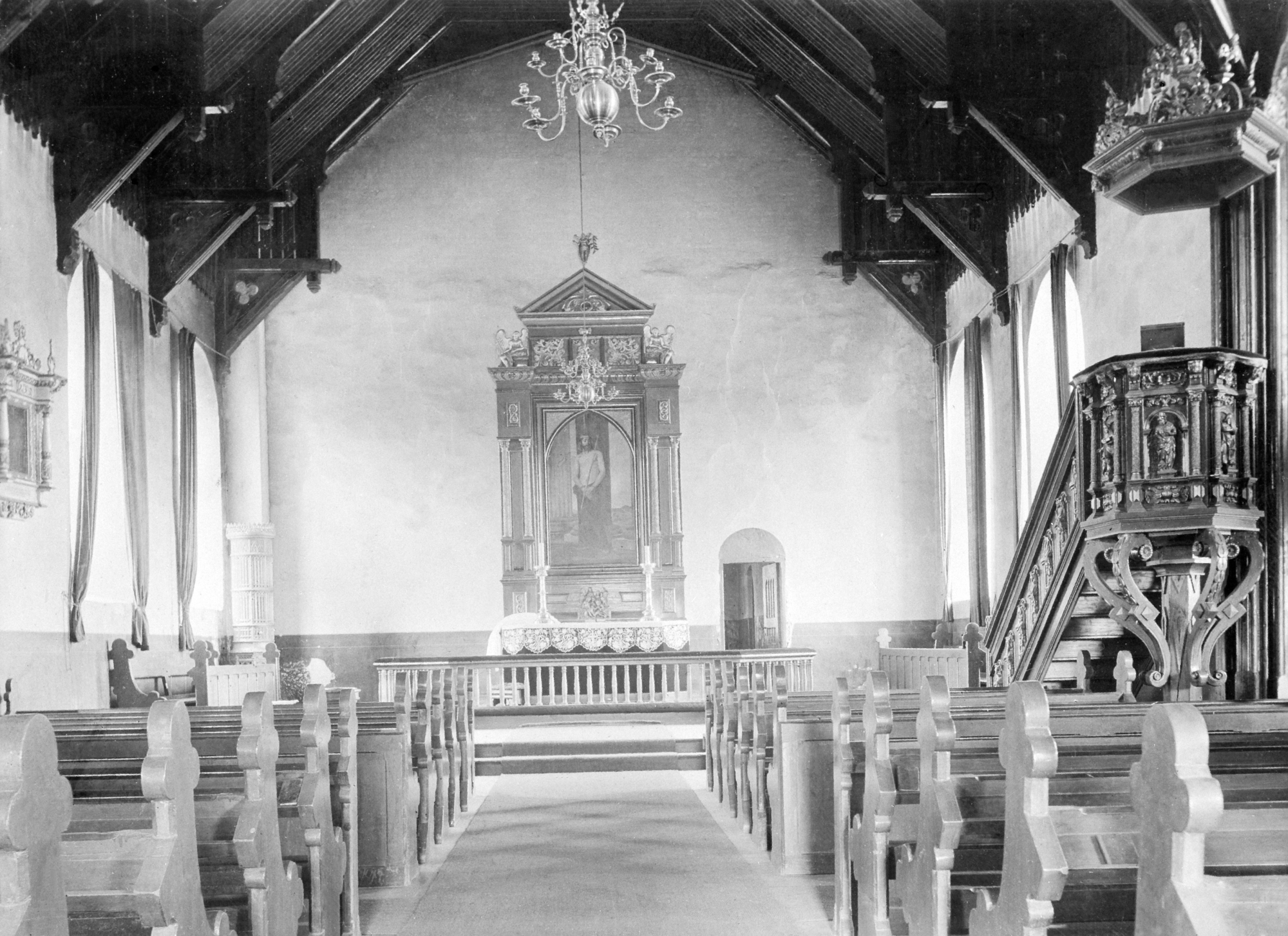

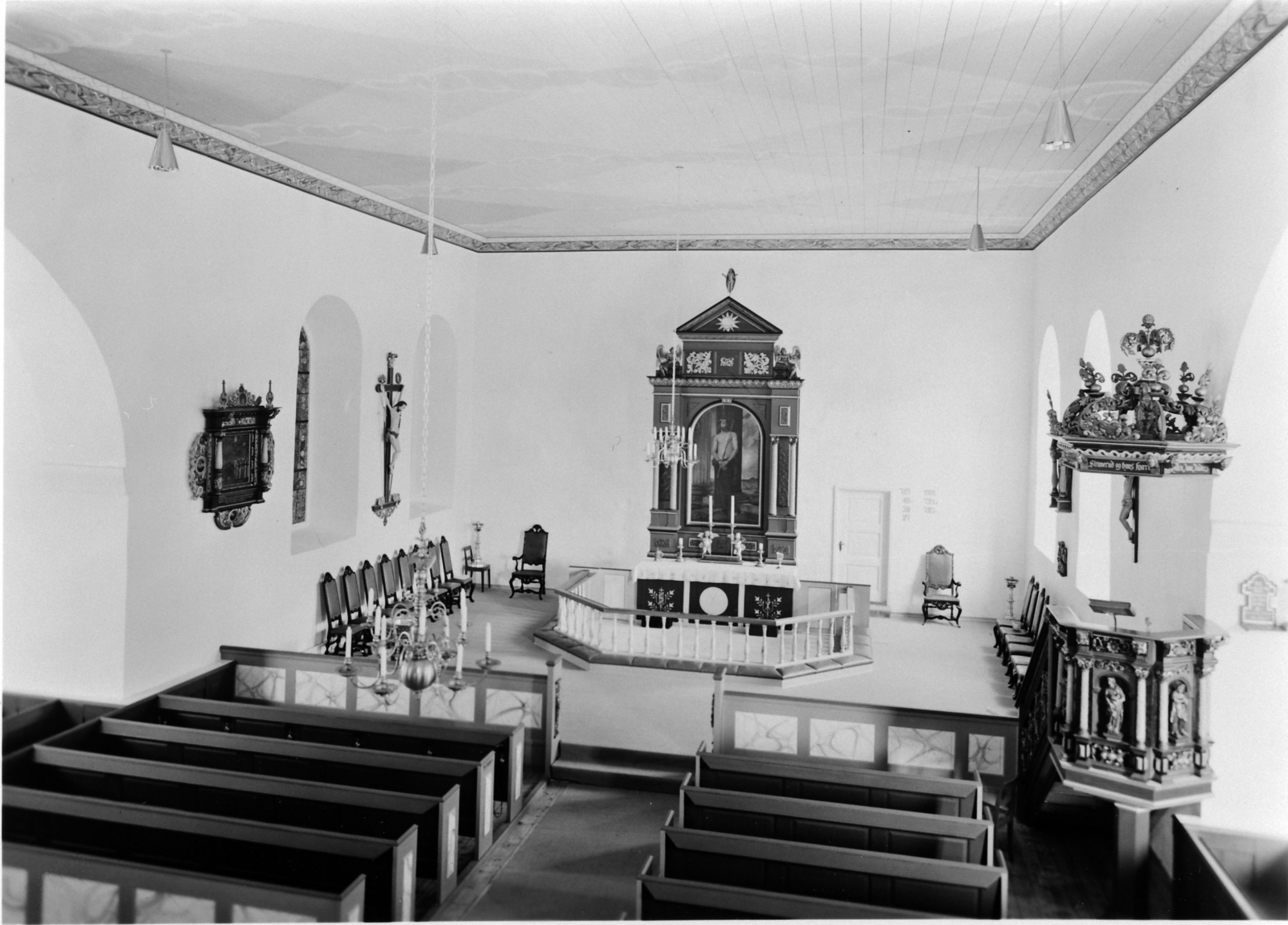

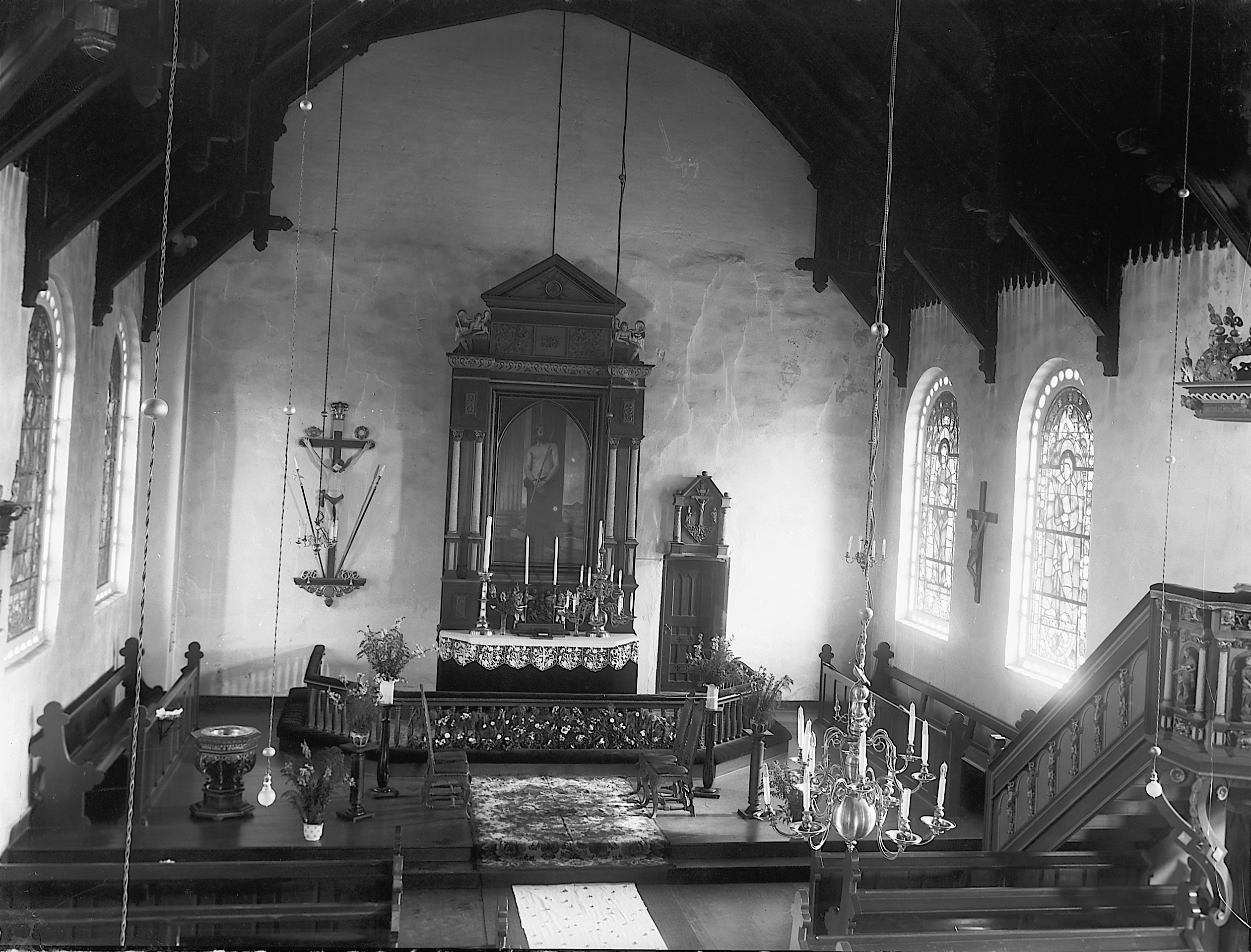

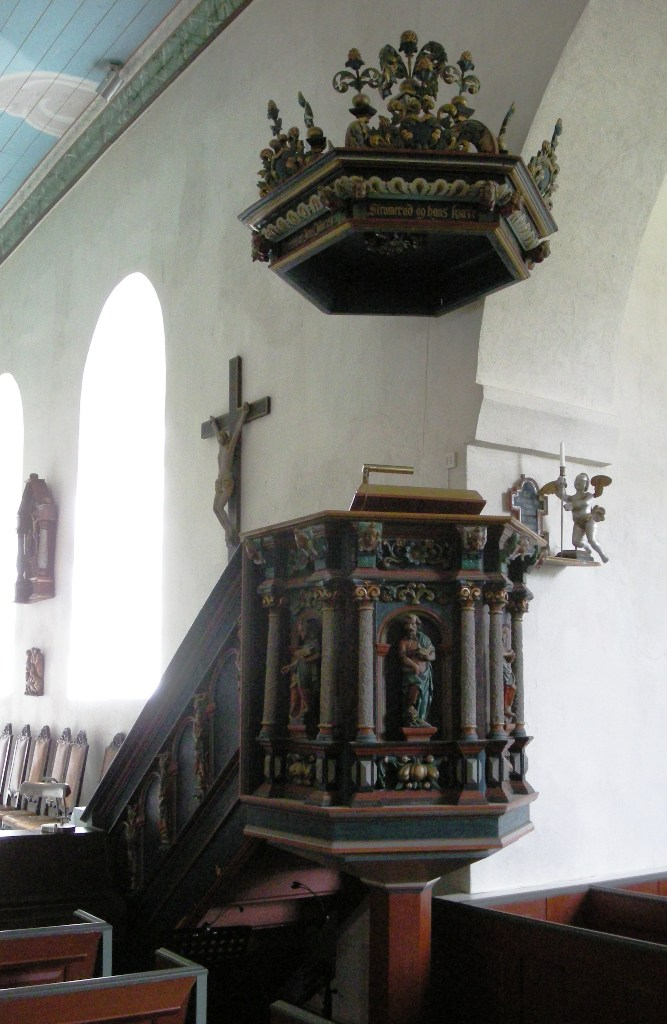

== See also ==
- List of churches in Hamar
