= A with ring above (Cyrillic) =

Cyrillic letter used for /ɔ/ or /ɒ/ in Selkup

- А̊ а̊

Usage
- Writing system: Cyrillic
- Type: Alphabetic
- Sound values: [ɔ], [ɒ]

A with ring above (А̊ а̊; italics: А̊ а̊) is a letter of the Cyrillic script. In all its forms, it looks exactly like the Latin letter A with ring above (Å å Å å). It has not yet been encoded in Unicode.

A with ring above is used only in the alphabet of the Selkup language, where it represents the open-mid back rounded vowel /ɔ/ or the open back rounded vowel /ɒ/.

== See also ==
- Å å : Latin letter Å
- Cyrillic characters in Unicode
