= Aagard =

Aagard is a surname, a variant of Ågård/Aagaard. It may refer to:

- Douglas C. Aagard (born 1954), American politician
- Julie Dahle Aagård (born 1978), Norwegian jazz musician
- Birgit Aagard-Svendsen, Danish business executive

== See also ==
- Aagaard
- Agard
