= Amunda Kolderup =

Norwegian opera singer (1846–1882)

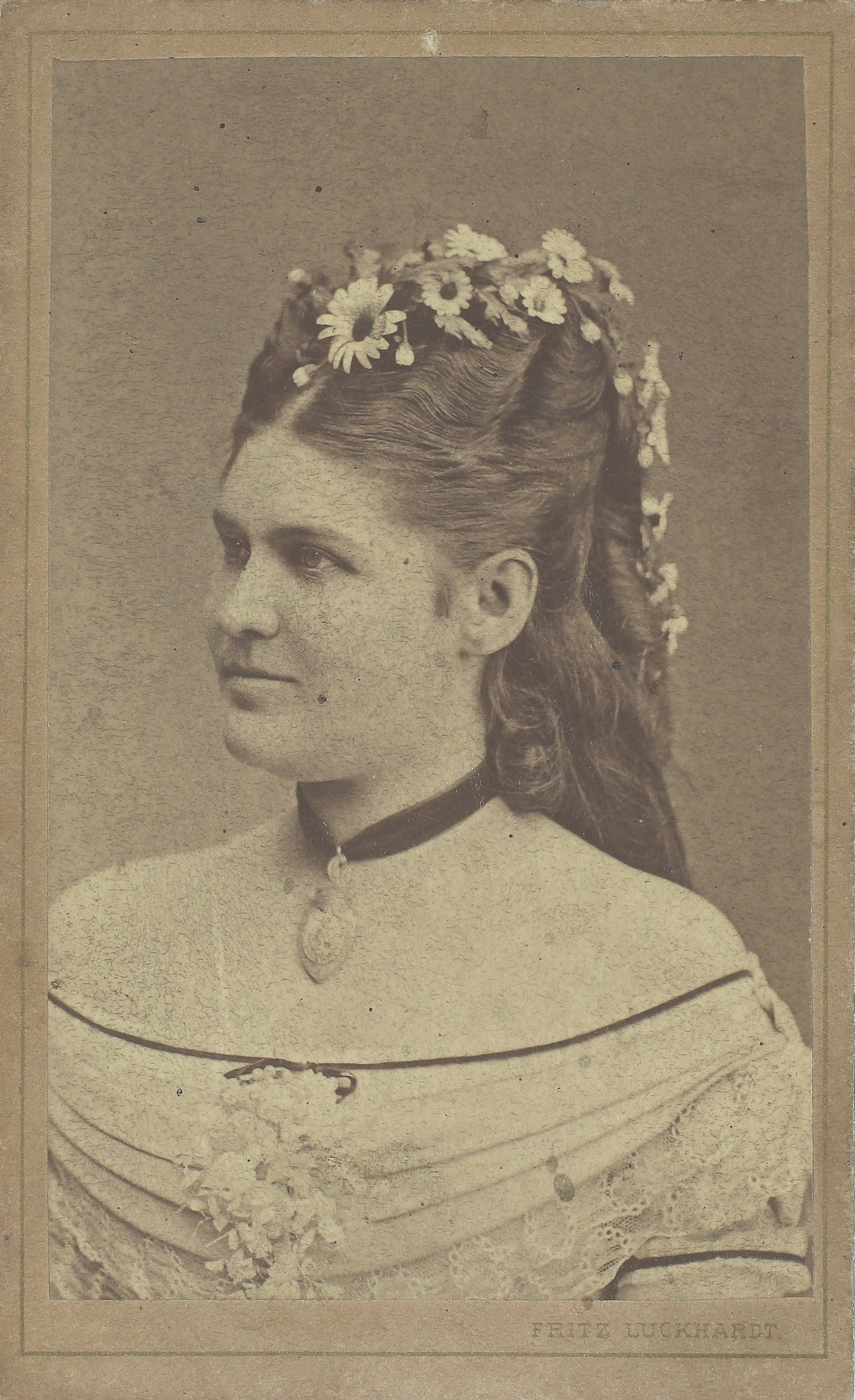
- Amunda Kolderup in c. 1875
- Born: Amunda Bartholda Wilhelmine Mariane Kolderup; 15 December 1846; Furnes, Norway
- Died: 28 September 1882 (aged 35); Christiania, Norway
- Occupation: Opera singer

Amunda Bartholda Wilhelmine Mariane Kolderup (15 December 1846 – 28 September 1882) was a Norwegian opera singer.

== Early life ==
Amunda Bartholda Wilhelmine Mariane Kolderup was born on 15 December 1846 on a farm in Furnes to riding champion Niels Herman Colbjørnsen Kolderup and Ulrikke Charlotte Todderud. From an early age, Kolderup attracted attention with her singing voice. But only when she was 23 she was encouraged to further develop her singing talent during a visit to Christiania. She subsequently became a student of Gina Sandberg in Christiania before she was admitted as a pupil at Baroness Adelaïde Leuhusen's singing school in Stockholm in 1872. Which is where she gave her first concert two years later.

== Career ==
After two years with Lehusen, Kolderup began her career as a travelling opera singer. However, opportunities were scarce for travelling singers and despite receiving many praises for her talent, the venues and market for singers was limited. In 1876 in Bergen, Kolderup performed in half-empty halls and although she received praise for her voice, she was criticised for having too much emotion and overacting during her performances.

In 1874, she became a student of Richard Levy in Vienna. On 18 September 1875, she made her operatic debut as Leonora in Verdi's Il trovatore at the opera in Olomouc. She made her second debut as Agathe in Jægerbruden. Her success in these roles made her in much demand and until the autumn of 1878 she was engaged on the opera stages of Salzburg, Würzburg, Dessau and Mannheim, performing 22 major operatic roles on those stages. The emotion she displayed during her performances for which she was criticised in Norway was instead praised at the German opera houses and was considered one of her best talents.

After this, she travelled to Milan to study Italian opera with Professor San Giovanni at the Milan Conservatory. According to Kolderup, it was only there that she learned how to use her voice properly. Afterward, she resumed her engagements in the German-speaking areas and experienced further success. The Aachen and Mainz opera houses were allowed to use her for one season each. In May 1881, Kolderup became prima donna at the opera in Kassel, which could be considered the last step to get to the Berlin State Opera, considered to be the "pinnacle of art".

Among Kolderup's leading roles were Selika in Giacomo Meyerbeer's L'Africaine, Valentine in Les Huguenots, Margrethe in Faust, Elsa in Wagner's Lohengrin, Countess Almaviva in Mozart's The Marriage of Figaro, Mathilde in Rossini's William Tell and Elizabeth in Wagner's Tannhäuser.

== Illness and death ==
On 1 October 1881, while she was waiting in the wings during a dress rehearsal for Weber's Oberon, where she was set to play Rezia, a particularly strenuous and demanding role, Kolderup had a stroke. She returned to Norway to recover with full pay. Kolderup began to sing again and had hoped to return to the German opera houses in guest roles the following year but her strength weakened after catching a cold and she died on 28 September 1882 in Christiania at the age of 35.

Kolderup's funeral had a large attendance. Opera singer Thorvald Lammers said at the funeral "in her breast lived a realm of tones as beautiful as has never been heard in this land".

After Kolderup's death it was said that Norway lost its foremost singer.
