= Aase Schibsted Knudsen =

Norwegian writer (born 1954)

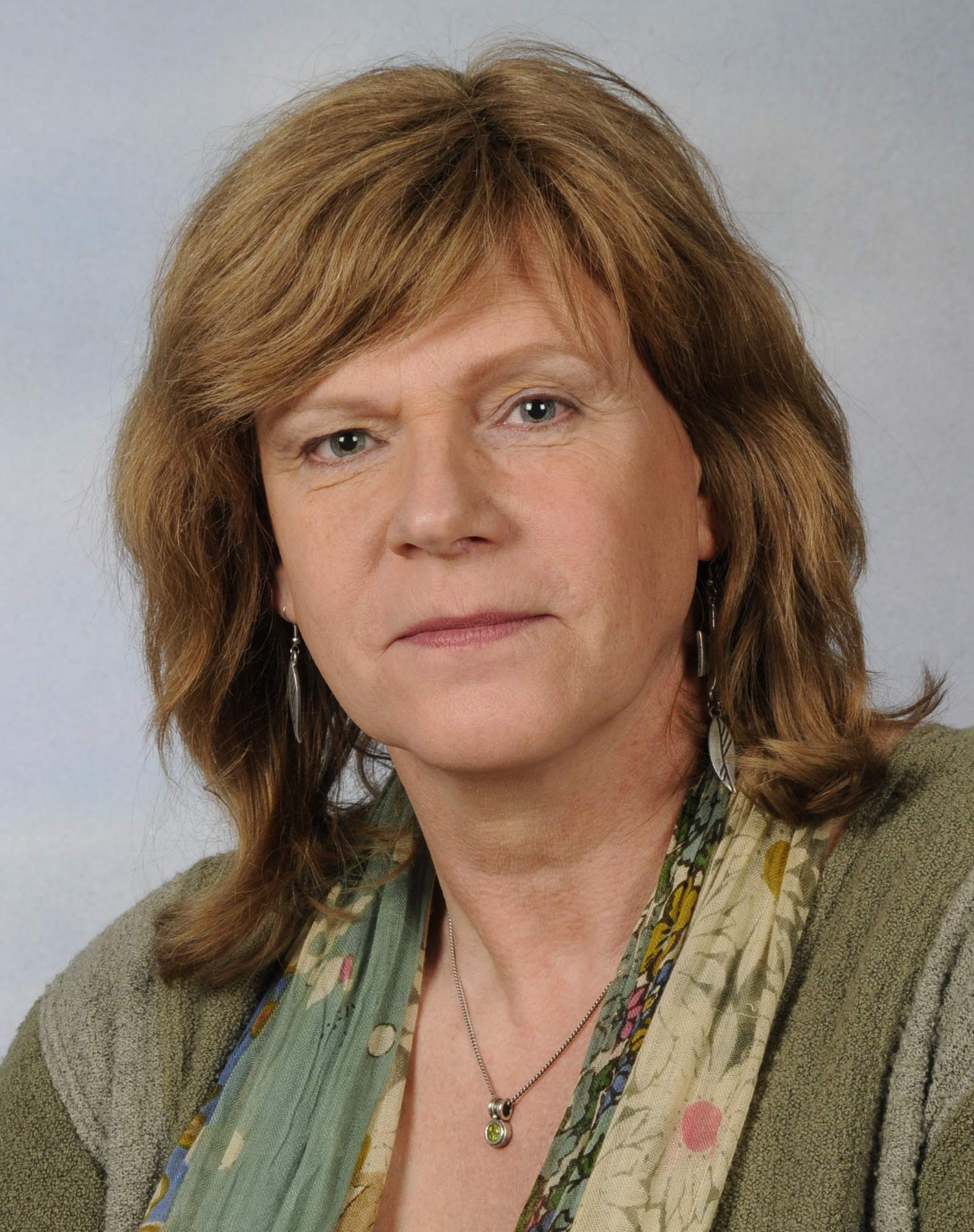
- Knudsen in 2012
- Born: November 19, 1954 (age 71); Furnes, Norway
- Education: KTH Royal Institute of Technology (PhD)
- Occupations: academic writer

Aase Schibsted Knudsen (born 19 November 1954) is a Norwegian writer and academic.

== Biography ==
Knudsen earned a doctoral degree from the KTH Royal Institute of Technology in 2004. From 2002 to 2007, she was the head of the Media Technology Laboratory at Gjøvik University College. She serves as docent emerita at the Norwegian Film and Television School at the University of Inland Norway.

Knudsen is a transgender woman. In 2010, served as deputy chair of the Transpolitical Committee in the Norwegian Organisation for Sexual and Gender Diversity, advocating for the rights of transgender people in Norway.
