= Ole Rømer Aagaard Sandberg =

Norwegian politician (1900–1985)

Ole Rømer Aagaard Sandberg (21 July 1900 – 26 August 1985) was a Norwegian farmer and politician for the Centre Party. He chaired the Norwegian Agrarian Association from 1951 to 1955 and was a member of Parliament from 1957 to 1965.

== Personal life ==
He was born in Furnes as a son of military officer and politician Ole Rømer Aagaard Sandberg (1865–1925) and Hanna Krag (1870–1963). He was a paternal grandson of Ole Rømer Sandberg and maternal grandson of Hans Hagerup Krag, great-grandson of priest Christian Juell Sandberg, great-grandnephew of Ole Rømer Aagaard Sandberg (1811–1883), nephew of Colonel Christian Juell Sandberg and first cousin of Major Ole Rømer Aagaard Sandberg (1888–1975).

His sister Anna was the mother of Joachim Rønneberg. Another sister Johanne married Trygve Dehli Laurantzon. In 1926 he married Oddlaug Moen, an adoptive daughter of horticulturalist Olav Moen.

== Career ==
He finished his secondary education in Hamar in 1919 and graduated from the Norwegian College of Agriculture in 1925. He managed the farm Hol in Furnes from 1925, and took over the farm in 1935. He later took over the farm Kåtorp as well.

In Furnes he chaired the local Agrarian Association branch from 1927 to 1929, the local branch of the employers' association Jordbrukets Arbeidsgiverforening from 1936 to 1945 (he was also a deputy member of the national board 1936–1939) and the local Agrarian Party branch from 1937 to 1940. He was a member of Furnes municipal council from 1934 to 1951, the last six years in the executive committee, and a member of the municipal land board from 1936 to 1952 and 1956 to 1960.

In the 1940s he was a board member of Potetmelfabrikantenes Salgskontor (1940–1945), Gartnerhallen (1941–1945), Felleskjøpet (1946–1949) and NLVF (1949–1955). During the occupation of Norway by Nazi Germany Sandberg was a member of Hjemmefrontens Ledelse, and he was a candidate for Gerhardsen's First Cabinet after the war. He was drafted into Økonomisk samordningsråd and the board of Erstatningsdirektoratet. In the 1950s he became chair of Hedmark Agrarian Association (1951–1953) and the Norwegian Agrarian Association (1951–1955). He also served one last term as councilman in Furnes, from 1955 to 1959. He was elected to the Parliament of Norway from Hedmark in 1957, and was re-elected in 1961. After declining re-nomination and leaving Parliament, he chaired a committee from 1966 to 1967 founded by the Ministry of Finance to evaluate the tax and duty system of Norway.

Sandberg was also a board member of the Norwegian Directorate of Labour from 1955, and deputy chair until 1964, and Forsikringsselskapet Odin from 1959 to 1964. He chaired the supervisory council of Hamar Slagteri from 1956 to 1958. In 1971 he was proclaimed an honorary member of the Norwegian Agrarian Association. He died in August 1985 in Hamar.

Preceded by Arne Rostad	Chairman of the Norwegian Agrarian Association; 1951–1955	Succeeded by Hallvard Eika
