= Furnes, Norway =

Village in Ringsaker Municipality, Norway

Furnes
- Village
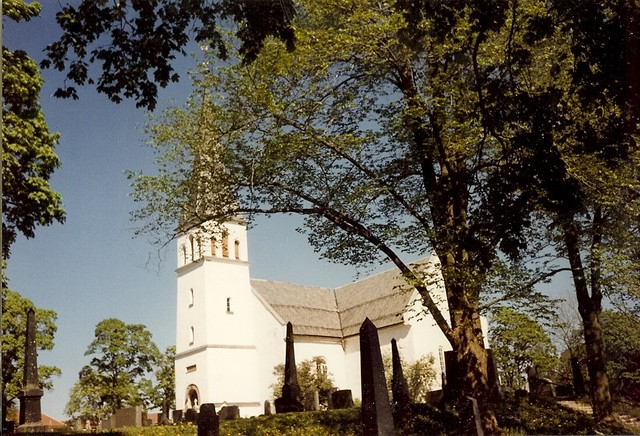
- View of the village church
- Interactive map of Furnes
- Location within Innlandet Location within Norway
- Coordinates: 60.8355°N 11.02409°E
- Country: Norway
- Region: Eastern Norway
- County: Innlandet
- District: Hedmarken
- Municipality: Ringsaker Municipality
- Elevation: 220 m (720 ft)
- Time zone: UTC+01:00 (CET)
  - Summer (DST): UTC+02:00 (CEST)
- Post Code: 2320 Furnes

Furnes is a village in Ringsaker Municipality in Innlandet county, Norway. The village is located just west of the European route E6 highway, about 5 kilometres (3.1 mi) from the town of Hamar to the southeast and the same distance from Brumunddal to the northwest. Furnes Church is located in the village. It was built in 1707 using some of the stone from the Cathedral Ruins in Hamar.

This village was the administrative centre of the old Furnes Municipality that existed from 1891 until 1964.

== Name ==
The village is named Furnes (Old Norse: Furnes). The meaning of the first element is unknown. It is possible that the first part came from the old name of a local river such as Fura or it could be derived from the word furu which means "pine". The last element is nes which means "headland".

== Notable people ==
- Jon Balke (born 1955), a jazz pianist and composer
- Ole Ellefsæter (born 1939), a retired Olympic cross-country skier
- Alf Frydenberg (1896–1989), a Norwegian civil servant
- Aase Schibsted Knudsen (born 1954), an academic
- Amunda Kolderup (1846–1882), an opera singer
- Erik Kristiansen (born 1961), an ice hockey player
- Olav Larssen (1894–1981), a newspaper editor
- Odd Narud (1919–2000), a businessperson
- Ove Røsbak (born 1959), a poet, novelist, children's writer, and biographer
- Ole Rømer Aagaard Sandberg (1900–1985), a politician for the Norwegian Centre Party
