= Kråkö =

Island in Porvoo, Finland

Coordinates: 60°21′N 25°40′E

Kråkö is a small island in Porvoo (Borgå in Swedish) in Finland. There is a primary school for Swedish-speaking children on the island and a voluntary fire station. There used to be a few shops and a cafeteria. However these closed down in the late 1990s. There is a museum of boatbuilding, reflecting the islanders' main industry during the 19th and 20th centuries. The population was, until recent times, almost unilingually Swedish-speaking. More lately, the Finnish-speaking population has increased and a number of new homes have been built on the island. Many of the new houses are summer holiday homes and are not occupied year-round. Kråkö is Swedish for "Crow Island". Kråkö has a surface area of 189 ha. Kråkö has a 330 residents annually.
